= Zenon Jachymek =

Polish officer (1912–1986)

Zenon Józef Jachymek
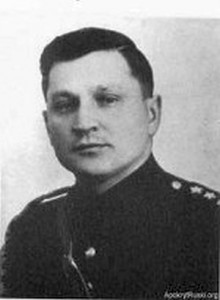
- Zenon Jachymek in Polish uniform
- Nicknames: Sławek, Waldemar, Wallenrod, Wiktor, Zygmunt Nowosad
- Born: 9 December 1912; Komarów, Poland
- Died: 6 March 1986 (aged 73) Wrocław, Poland
- Allegiance: Austria-Hungary; Second Polish Republic; Polish Underground State; Cursed Soldiers
- Service years: 1939-1946
- Conflicts: Invasion of Poland; World War II; Polish-Ukrainian ethnic conflict: Hrubieszów Revolution; Battle of Ulhówek and Rzeczyca; Anti-communist resistance in Poland (1944–1953)

Zenon Józef Jachymek (pseudonyms; "Sławek", "Waldemar", "Wallenrod", "Wiktor", "Zygmunt Nowosad") was a Polish military officer and partisan commander active in the Home Army and related underground formations in the Lublin and Zamość region during World War II. He is documented as a captain of infantry and a regional commander in the resistance.

== Biography ==
=== Early life ===
Zenon Jachymek was born in Komarów on 9 December 1912, in the Kingdom of Galicia and Lodomeria. Jachymek attended the junior high school in Tomaszów Lubelski, where in 1933 he obtained his secondary school leaving certificate. From 1933 to 1935, he studied veterinary medicine in Lviv. In the years 1935–1936, he completed a one-year period of compulsory military service, during which he graduated from the Divisional Reserve Infantry Cadet Course of the 3rd Legions Infantry Division, organized at the 3rd Battalion of the 9th Legions Infantry Regiment in Tomaszów Lubelski. From 1936 to 1938, he continued his studies.

=== Second World War ===
In the summer of 1939, he was mobilized into the Polish Army and assigned to the 9th Legions Infantry Regiment, in whose ranks he took part in the September Campaign of 1939. Initially serving as a platoon commander and later in the 9th Company of the 3rd Battalion, he fought near Klimontów and Starachowice, and subsequently in the Lublin region. After the end of the September Campaign, he avoided captivity and returned to his home village.

During the German occupation, he began underground activity as early as the autumn of 1939. He was a co-organizer of the Service for Poland's Victory and later the Union of Armed Struggle (ZWZ) structures in Komarów. He initially served as deputy commander and later as commander of the ZWZ Komarów outpost. At the turn of 1940 and 1941, he was appointed commander of assault and combat sabotage units in the Tomaszów District of the Union of Armed Struggle.

He commanded numerous actions and battles against German forces and the Ukrainian Insurgent Army. In December 1942, he took part in attacks on settlements inhabited by German colonists in Moszczany, Komarów, and Wolica Śniatycka. In March 1943, he was appointed commander of District VII of the Tomaszów Lubelski Home Army District, and on 11 November 1943 he was promoted to the rank of second lieutenant of the infantry reserve. In the spring of 1944, he became the originator and commander of so-called anti-Ukrainian units, which concentrated the main forces of the region against UPA formations. On 10 March 1944, he commanded Polish partisan units involved in the crime committed in Sahryń. On 2 June 1944, he led a major operation against the UPA near Dąbrowa, Ulhówek, and Rzeczyca.

After the entry of the Red Army into the region, he was sought by the NKVD and the Polish Security Service (UB). He went into hiding at militia posts, whose personnel at the time consisted largely of former Home Army and Peasant Battalions soldiers.

=== Anti-communist resistance in Poland (1944–1946) ===
After the dissolution of the Home Army in January 1945, he remained active in the anti-communist underground, initially within the Home Army Resistance Movement. In May 1945, he was transferred to the Hrubieszów District of the Armed Forces Delegation for Poland (DSZ), later Freedom and Independence (WiN), where from June to December 1945 he served as deputy district commander. By Order No. 319 of 1 June 1945, issued by the DSZ Delegate for Poland, he was promoted to the rank of reserve captain.

In December 1945, he organized a transfer route to Sweden for compromised members of the underground. From late 1945, he resided in Sweden, returning to Poland in May 1946. He used a forged "legal" identity card issued in the name of "Zygmunt Nowosad", allegedly identifying him as an employee of the Ministry of Public Security in Sopot.

==== Imprisonment ====
He was betrayed to the security services by the wife of one of his associates. On 21 September 1946, he was arrested by an officer of the Security Office in the village of Kosowo, Świecie County. He was initially imprisoned in the County Security Office detention center in Świecie, then in the Provincial Security Office detention center in Bydgoszcz, and later transferred to the Provincial Security Office prison in Lublin. Arrested by the Military Prosecutor's Office in Lublin, he underwent a harsh investigation. By the verdict of the Regional Court in Lublin of 23 September 1947 (case file Sr 857/47), he was sentenced to three death sentences and permanent loss of civil rights. Under the amnesty of 22 February 1947, the death sentence was commuted to 15 years of imprisonment. He was held in Lublin Castle prison and later in the Central Prison in Wronki. By decision of the Provincial Court in Lublin on 20 June 1956, pursuant to the amnesty of 27 April 1956, his sentence was reduced to 10 years and he was ordered to be immediately released. He was released from prison on 23 August 1956.

== After the wars ==
After regaining his freedom, he settled in Wrocław, where he died on 6 March 1986. He was buried in the parish cemetery in Komarów. On 9 September 1993, by decision of the Military Court in Lublin, he was formally rehabilitated.

== Legacy ==
In 2012, the documentary film Death Sentence, dedicated to Zenon Jachymek, was released. The film was directed by Ewa Szakalicka, and its official screening took place on 9 December 2012 in Komarów, on the centenary of Jachymek's birth.
