= Bolesław Zajączkowski =

Polish commander (1891–1920)

- Born: 1891; Kraków, Poland
- Died: 17 August 1920 (aged 28–29); Zadwórze, Poland
- Burial place: Lwów Eaglets Cemetery
- Military career
- Conflicts: Battle of Lwów
- Awards: Virtuti Militari

Capt. Bolesław Zajączkowski (1891 in Kraków – 17 August 1920 in Zadwórze) was a Polish lawyer and reserve officer of the Polish Army.

== Polish-Ukrainian War ==
A former reserve NCO of the Austro-Hungarian Army, he volunteered for the Polish forces fighting in the battle of Lwów in the Polish-Ukrainian War. During the fights for that city against the forces of the West Ukrainian People's Republic he commanded a machine gun post at the so-called Execution Hill (Polish: Góra Straceń), a scene of particularly heavy fights.

After the successful defense of the city, he returned to civilian life only to rejoin the Polish Army after the outbreak of the Polish-Soviet War.

== Polish-Soviet War ==
During the Budennyi's assault on Lwów he was chosen as a commander of a volunteer battalion of roughly 330 men, mostly pupils and students.

=== Battle of Zadwórze ===
All but 12 men of that volunteer battalion perished in the 11-hour battle of Zadwórze on 17 August 1920. For entire day, the unit under his command withheld repeated attack by an entire cavalry division. After their defenses were finally broken, Zajączkowski committed suicide so as not to fall into enemy hands. For his merits he was posthumously promoted to the rank of Major and awarded with Virtuti Militari medal. After the war his body was one of five to be exhumed, identified and buried with military honors at the Lwów Eaglets' Cemetery in Lwów. The battle was sometimes called "The Polish Battle of Thermopylae".
