= Krystyna Magdalena Munk =

Polish doctor

- Born: 29 April 1913; Zadworze
- Died: 15 March 1999 (aged 85)
- Education: Polish School of Medicine
- Occupation: Physician
- Known for: King's Commendation for Brave Conduct

Krystyna Magdalena Munk (29 April 1913 – 15 March 1999) was a Polish medical doctor who completed her studies at the Polish School of Medicine at the University of Edinburgh during World War II. She was awarded a King's Commendation for Brave Conduct.

== Early life and education ==
She was born in Zadworze near Lwow (now Lviv) in Eastern Poland to Ludwik and Antonina (née Frysz) Munk. She was the sister of Andrzej Munk.

In 1932, she passed the Matura, the high school leaving certificate, at the Emilia Plater secondary school in Cracow. She went directly from school to the city's Jagiellonian University to study biology, but the following year, 1933, she changed her course to medicine, receiving an "absolutorium" (certificate of completion) in 1938.

== War experience ==
She was undertaking hospital training in Athens, Greece, when war broke out, and returned to Lwow where she was sent to a military field hospital in Tarnopol. Following the Soviet occupation of the area, she returned to Athens via Hungary and Romania, traveling from there to Marseille, where the Polish Consulate found her a medical post on the Polish merchant ship, SS Warszawa, which transported troops and weapons across the Mediterranean. She worked there for two years until the ship was sunk by a German torpedo on 26 December 1941. Munk supervised the ship's evacuation and, along with the captain, was among the last to leave. They were rescued by the British corvette HMS Peony and taken to Tobruk. She was awarded a King's Commendation for Brave Conduct in the Merchant Navy and received a congratulatory letter from British Prime Minister Winston Churchill in recognition of her brave conduct.

== Life in Scotland ==
She reached England in April 1942 on a naval convoy, and went to Scotland in May where she joined the Polish School of Medicine in order to complete her studies. She graduated with an M.B.Ch.B. on 21 April 1943, and was awarded a doctorate on 29 June 1946. She stayed in Edinburgh after the war as a GP, and married the naval architect Symington McDonald. Towards the end of her life, she lost her sight and developed Parkinson's Disease, dying in Edinburgh in 1999.
