= Battle of Lwów (1920) =

1920 battle during the Polish–Soviet War

Coordinates: 49°50′33″N 24°01′56″E

- Part of Polish–Bolshevik War
Date	July–September 1920
Location	near Lwów (now Lviv, Ukraine)
Result	Polish-Ukrainian victory

Belligerents
Poland; Ukrainian People's Republic	Russian SFSR

Commanders and leaders
Czesław Mączyński (Ukrainian People's Republic) Mykhailo Omelianovych-Pavlenko	Alexander Yegorov; Semyon Budyonny

Strength
22,000+	32,000

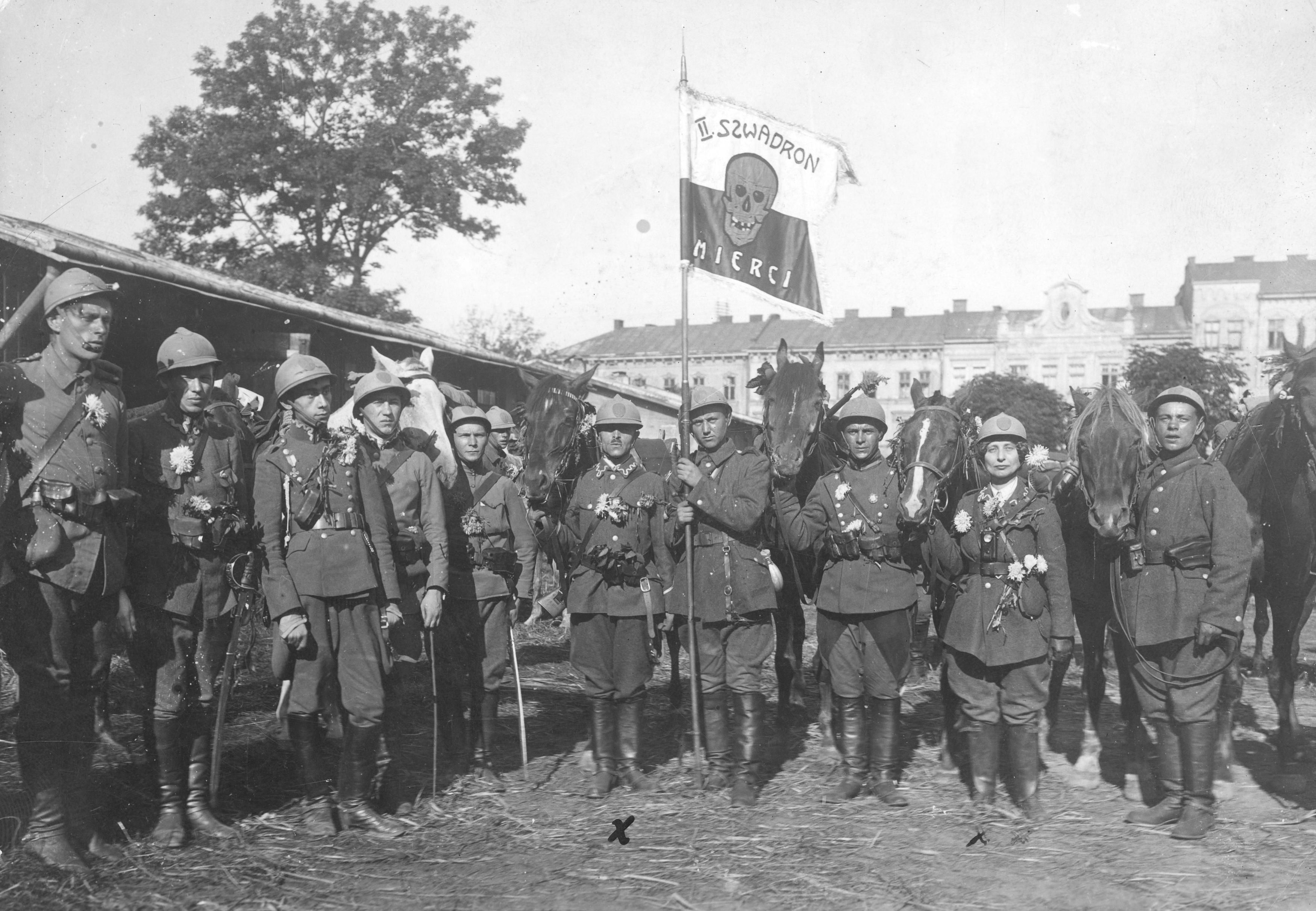
Polish Voluntary II Death Squad in Lviv 1920

During the Polish-Soviet War of 1920 the city of Lwów (modern Lviv, Ukraine) was attacked by the forces of Alexander Yegorov. Since mid-June 1920, the 1st Cavalry Army of Semyon Budyonny had been trying to reach the city from the north and east. At the same time, Lwów was preparing its defenses. The inhabitants raised and fully equipped three regiments of infantry and two regiments of cavalry, and constructed defensive lines. The city was defended by the equivalent of three Polish divisions aided by one Ukrainian infantry division. Finally, after almost a month of heavy fighting, on August 16 the Red Army crossed the Bug River and, reinforced by additional 8 divisions of the Red Cossacks, started an assault on the city. The fighting occurred with heavy casualties on both sides, but after three days the assault was halted and the Red Army retreated. With the crushing defeat of the main forces of the Red Army in the battle of Warsaw, and the Polish victories at Komarów and Zadwórze, the Russian forces were forced to retreat from Lwów.

For the heroic defense with large units of locally raised volunteers the city was awarded with the Virtuti Militari medal on 11 November 1920.

== Lwów theatre of operations ==
=== Commanders and forces ===
Polish commanders included Czesław Mączyński, Domaszewicz (240), Zagórski (240), Tatar-Trześniowski (240), Abraham (cavalry), Krynicki, Śniadowski (artillery), Wit Sulimirski. Rómmel (1st Cavalry Division). Units: 240 Volunteers. Size: ~12,000 volunteers. 1st Cavalry Division.

Soviet commanders included Semyon Budyonny, Iona Yakir (cavalry), Grigory Kotovsky (cavalry). Budyonny's insistence (bordering on insubordination) on capturing Lwów led to the weakening of Soviet forces near Warsaw and was a factor in their eventual defeat.

=== Battle ===
Around the time of Battle of Radzymin in mid-August, the Polish line of defense in the upper Bug River region had been breached by the Red Army. Polish units in that region had begun a series of delaying maneuvers (like the battle of Zadwórze) and retreated towards Lwów. The Polish 1st Cavalry Division engaged Soviet units under Budyonny near Artasów and Żółtańce.

On 12 August, Budyonny received orders for the Konarmiya "to destroy the enemy on the right bank of the Bug in the shortest possible time and, having forced the river, to follow on the heels of retreating Third and Sixth Polish Armies and seize the city of Lwów." Budyonny started a three-pronged attack on 13 August, and was at Lopatyn on 14 August. On 15 August, his 6th Cavalry Division swam across the river and came within 9 miles (14 km) of Lwów, despite a Polish counterattack supported by twenty planes. However, on 16 August, Budyonny received orders from Tukhachevsky to march to Ustilug-Wlodzimierz. Budyonny continued to advance such that Lwów was surrounded on three sides. Yet on the evening of 19 August, Budyonny received news of the Polish counteroffensive, and abandoned the siege of Lwów on 20 August.

== Related battles ==
Several battles near Lwów were decisive for the outcome of the entire war. They included:

- The Battle of Zadwórze on 17 August ended in the near total destruction of Polish forces, but at the same time halted the Soviet advance, preventing the forces of Semyon Budyonny from either advancing towards unprepared Lwów or breaking off and helping the Soviet forces fighting in the Battle of Warsaw.
- The Battle of Komarów on 31 August 1920, the world's largest cavalry battle since 1813 and the last great battle in which cavalry was used as such and not as mounted infantry. The Battle of Komarów was a complete disaster for the Russian 1st Cavalry Army which sustained heavy casualties and barely avoided being totally surrounded. After that battle, the 1st Cavalry Army morale had collapsed and the army which was one of the most feared of the Soviet troops was no longer considered an effective fighting force.

== See also ==
- Battle of Lemberg (1918)
- Battle of Lwów (1939)
- Lwów Eagles
- Polish-Ukrainian War
