= Maryan Lukasevych =

- Мар'ян Лукасевич
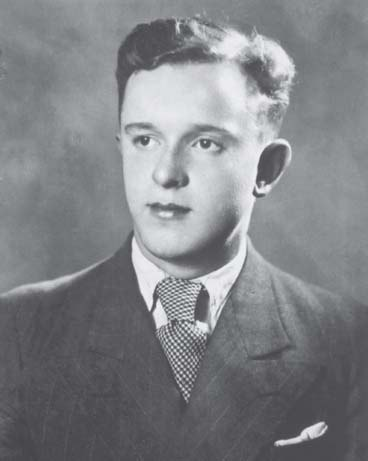
- Born: 22 June, 1920/1922; Tarnopol or Przemyśl
- Died: 9 September 1945; Near Żniatyn
- Cause of death: Burned alive
- Military career
- Allegiance: Ukrainian Insurgent Army
- Service years: 1944-1945
- Nicknames: "Jahoda" and "Czernyk"
- Conflicts: World War II; Polish-Ukrainian ethnic conflict †: Hrubieszów Revolution; Battle of Ulhówek and Rzeczyca; Attack on Variazh; Attack on Kryłów; Skirmish near Żniatyn †

Maryan Lukasevych (Ukrainian: Мар'ян Лукасевич; Polish: Marijan Łukaszewycz) also known by the pseudonyms "Jahoda, Czernyk" was a Ukrainian "major UPA", he commanded a few units of the Ukrainian Insurgent Army.

== Biography ==
=== Early life and education ===
Sources vary on Lukasevych's birth details: some record 1920 in Tarnopol while others specify 22 June 1922 in Przemyśl. He completed his secondary education at a gymnasium in Tarnopol.

In 1943, during World War II, Lukasevych joined the German-sponsored 5th SS Police Regiment (Galician), a unit composed largely of Ukrainian personnel. In spring 1944, he deserted alongside a group of fellow soldiers and aligned with the Ukrainian Insurgent Army, an anti-Soviet and anti-Polish nationalist force. He initially joined a UPA unit under the command of "Oczeret" in the Hrubieszów county region.

=== Military Career ===
Lukasevych rose rapidly in the UPA ranks. He soon took command of the sotnia (company) "Wowky" and was promoted to major. His forces engaged in numerous clashes with Soviet partisans, NKVD troops, and units of the Polish People's Army. By the second half of 1944, he organized and led the larger kurin (battalion) "Wowky," which incorporated three sotnias: "Wowky-1," "Wowky-2," and "Wowky-3." In early 1945, he assumed command of Tactical Sector 28 "Danyliw," overseeing all UPA operations in the Chełm region and Podlasie, including sotnias such as Czausa, Dawyda, Dudy, and Jara. After his death, command passed to "Berkut."

Lukasevych's tenure is linked in Polish historical accounts to the "Bloody Palm Sunday" attack on the village of Kryłów on 25 March 1945. Disguised in Soviet uniforms, his UPA sotnia assaulted a Milicja Obywatelska post, resulting in the deaths of 17 militia officers and 28 civilians including former major of Peasant Battalions, Stanisław Basaj "Ryś" .

=== Death & Legacy ===
On 9 September 1945, Lukasevych was burned alive in field hospital near Żniatyn during a skirmish between the MO and his unit in retaliation for the massacre that he committed in Kryłów and the killing of Stanisław Basaj "Ryś".

He is commemorated in UPA folklore through the marching song "Do boju prawoho, do boju stawajmo" ("To the righteous fight, let us stand"), dedicated to "Jahoda."
