= Stanisław Żelichowski =

Polish politician

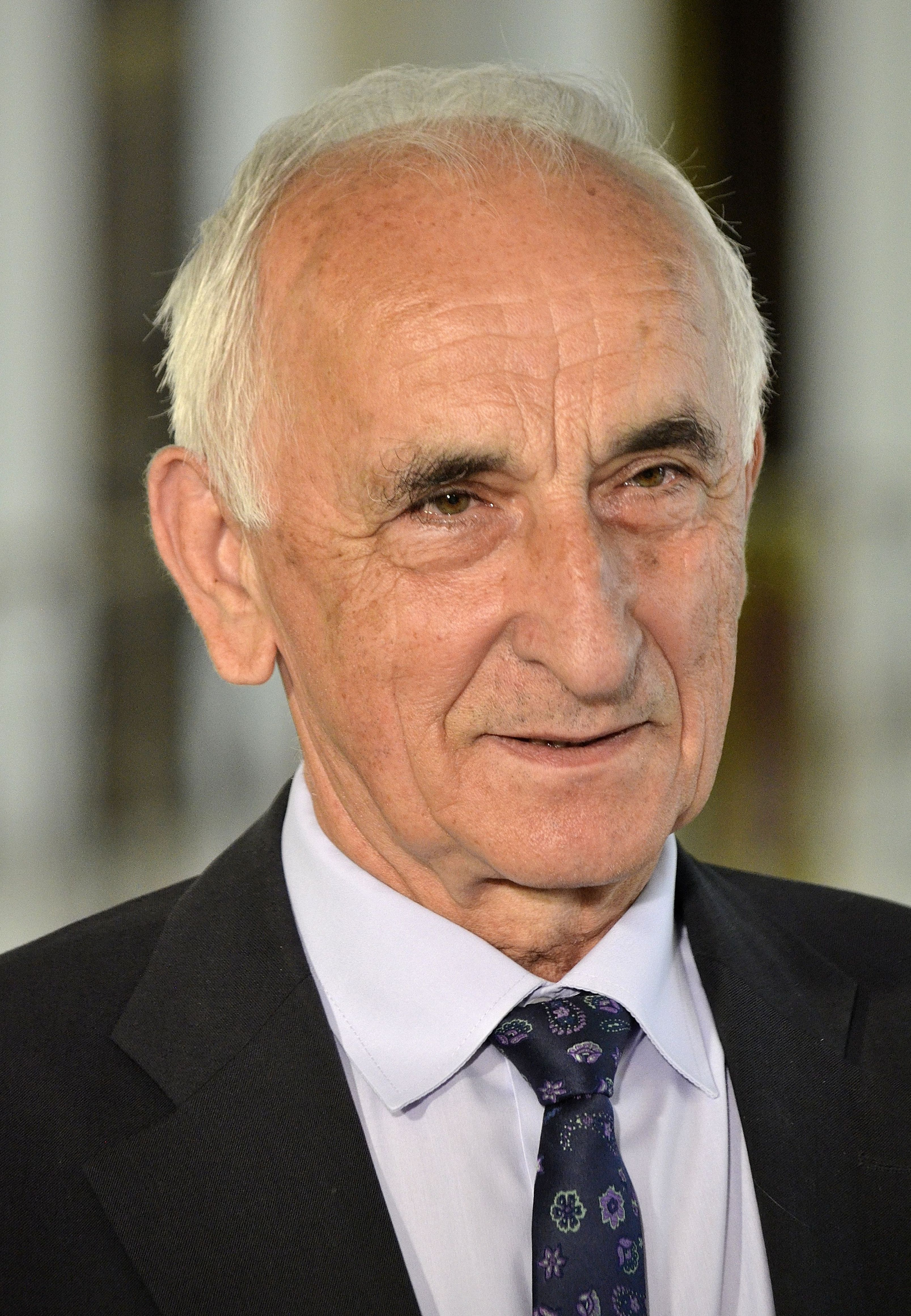

Minister of Environment
- In office 19 October 2001 – 3 March 2003
- President: Aleksander Kwaśniewski
- Prime Minister: Leszek Miller
- Preceded by: Antoni Tokarczuk
- Succeeded by: Czesław Śleziak

Minister of Environmental Protection, Natural Resources and Forestry
- In office 26 October 1993 – 31 October 1997
- President: Lech Wałęsa; Aleksander Kwaśniewski
- Prime Minister: Waldemar Pawlak; Józef Oleksy; Włodzimierz Cimoszewicz
- Preceded by: Bernard Błaszczyk
- Succeeded by: Jan Szyszko

Member of the Sejm
- In office 25 November 1991 – 12 November 2015
- Constituency: 34 – Elbląg

Personal details
- Born: 1944 (age 81–82)
- Party: Polish People's Party

Stanisław Żelichowski (born 9 April 1944 in Księżostany) is a Polish politician. He was elected to Sejm on 25 September 2005, getting 3532 votes in 34 Elbląg district as a candidate from the Polish People's Party list.

He was also a member of People's Republic of Poland Sejm 1985–1989, Sejm 1991–1993, Sejm 1993–1997, Sejm 1997–2001, and Sejm 2001–2005.

== See also ==
- Members of Polish Sejm 2005–2007
