= 8th Uhlan Regiment of Prince Józef Poniatowski =

Cavalry unit of Second Polish Republic

8th Uhlan Regiment of Prince Józef Poniatowski (Polish: 8 Pułk Ułanów Księcia Józefa Poniatowskiego, 8 puł) was a cavalry unit of the Polish Army in the Second Polish Republic. Until 1939, it was garrisoned in Kraków, and its traditions dated back to 1784, when a cavalry regiment of Prince Józef Poniatowski was formed in Lwow. The Prince Poniatowski Regiment was part of the Imperial Austrian Army, and in the early 20th century was called 1st Regiment of Austrian Uhlans. Nevertheless, it was made of ethnic Poles, with Polish officers and Polish traditions. In late 1918 it was renamed into 1st Land of Kraków Uhlan Regiment, and after a few years it was renamed again, into 8th Uhlan Regiment of Prince Jozef Poniatowski.

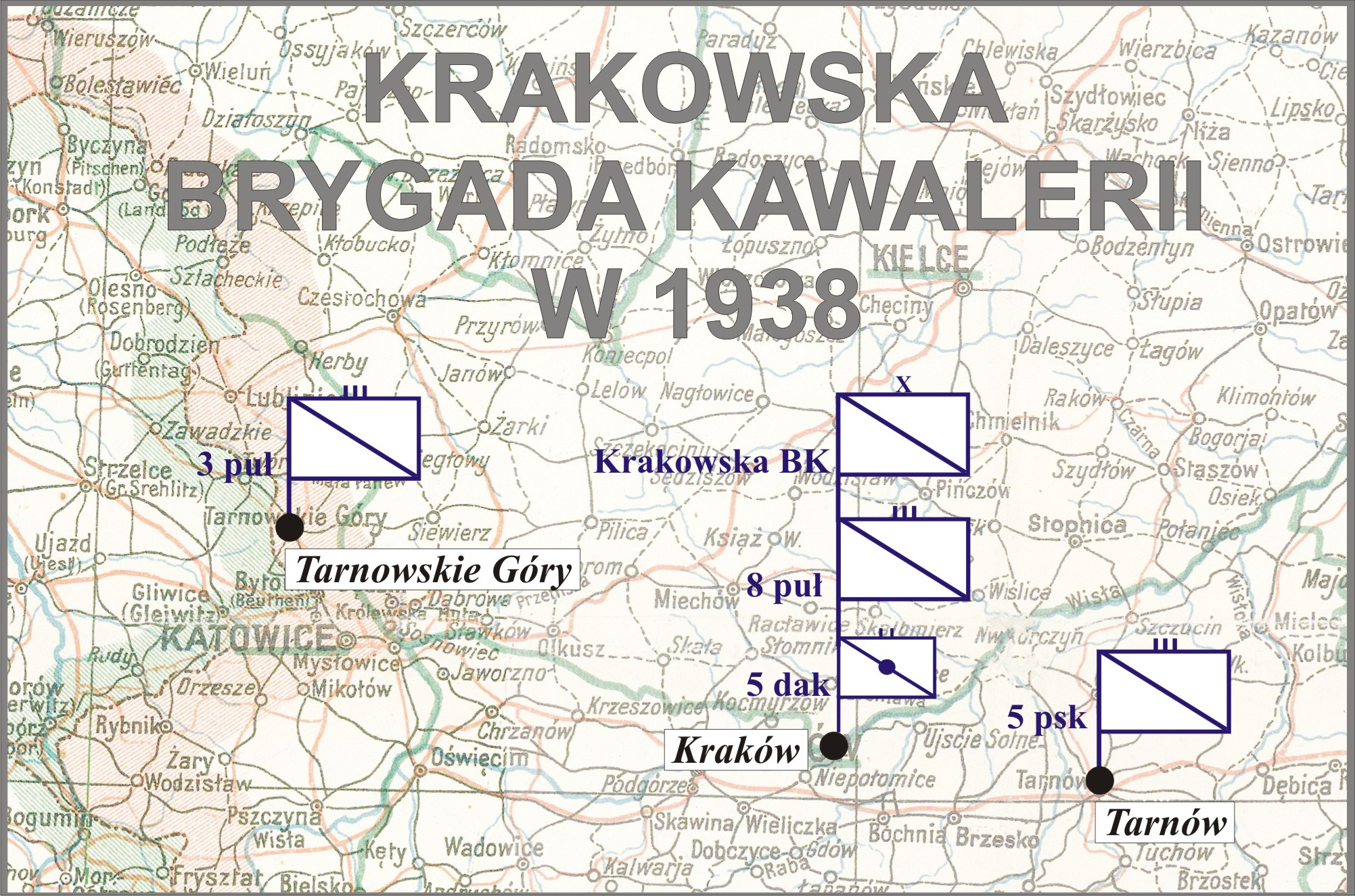
Krakowska BK w 1938

The regiment was involved in heavy fighting during the Polish-Soviet War. It took part in the Kiev offensive (1920), and then fought against 1st Cavalry Army (Soviet Union), commanded by Semyon Budyonny. It participated in the Battle of Komarow, one of the most important battles of the Polish-Bolshevik War.

After the war the regiment was garrisoned in the village of Rakow, located in the suburbs of Kraków. During the 1923 Kraków riot, its soldiers under Rotmistrz Lucjan Bochenek charged on the crowd of protesting workers. The charge was a complete failure, as horses slipped on wet pavement. Altogether, 14 uhlans of the regiment were killed in the riots.

During the Invasion of Poland, the regiment was part of Kraków Cavalry Brigade (General Zygmunt Piasecki), Kraków Army. Commanded by Colonel Wlodzimierz Dunin-Zuchowski, it was on September 3, 1939, sent to the area of Szczekociny, where it was mauled by the armoured Wehrmacht divisions. By September 6, it had crossed the Vistula, to join the newly created Lublin Army. Most of the regiment was destroyed during the campaign, only some of its elements managed to cross the Hungarian border in the second half of September 1939.

In 1940, the regiment was recreated in France, as 1st Prince Jozef Poniatowski Reece Company. Also, its traditions were kept by the Home Army of Kraków district.

== Commandants ==
- Colonel Roman Kawecki (XI 1918 – 14 I 1919),
- Colonel Adam Kicinski (14 I 1919 – 1920)
- Major Henryk Brzezowski (II – VIII 1920)
- Major Karol Rommel (1920)
- Rotmistrz Kornel Krzeczunowicz (1920–1921)
- Major Stanislaw Riess de Riesenhorst (1921)
- Colonel Adam Rozwadowski (1921)
- Colonel Stanislaw Riess de Riesenhorst (1921–1922)
- Colonel Wladyslaw Bzowski (1922-1923)
- Colonel Stanislaw Riess de Riesenhorst (1923)
- Colonel Aleksander Zelio (1923)
- Colonel Wladyslaw Bzowski (1923–1928)
- Colonel Stefan Dembinski (1928–1930)
- Colonel Kazimierz Mastalerz (1930–1939)
- Colonel Wlodzimierz Dunin-Zuchowski (1939)
- Major Wlodzimierz Kasperski (1940)
- Major Wladyslaw Pininski (1942–1944)

== Symbols ==
The regimental flag was funded by wives, mothers and sisters of the officers of the unit. In April 1920, it was handed to Captain Adam Sokolowij, during the ceremony at Lwow Cathedral.

The badge was accepted by the military authorities on February 28, 1922. It was in the shape of the cross, with dates 1791, 1918 and inscription 8 U written on its arms. On the top was the inscription PIERWSZY PULK (FIRST REGIMENT), and between the arms of the cross were coats of arms of the Lands of Kraków, Oświęcim, Zator and Cieszyn. The badge was designed by Jozef Brunicki, and manufactured by Franciszek Malina from Kraków.

The regiment had its own zurawiejka: “Wry mouths, wry legs, we are the uhlans of Prince Jozef”.

Currently, the traditions of the 8th Regiment are continued by reenactors of the Association Squadron Niepolomice, who wear the uniforms of the regiment during patriotic events. In Andrzej Wajda's Katyn (film), two of the main characters, Rotmistrz Andrzej and Colonel Jerzy serve in the 8th Uhlan Regiment.

== Sources ==
- Kornel Krzeczunowicz, Ułani księcia Józefa. Historia 8 Pułku Ułanów ks. Józefa Poniatowskiego 1784-1945, London 1960
- Rodowody pułków jazdy polskiej 1914 – 1947, pod red. Kornela Krzeczunowicza, London 1983
- Kazimierz Satora: Opowieści wrześniowych sztandarów. Warsaw: Instytut Wydawniczy Pax, 1990. ISBN 83-211-1104-1

== See also ==
- Polish cavalry
