= Tomaszówka, Zamość County =

Tomaszówka
- Village
- Location within Poland
- Coordinates: 50°40′37″N 23°32′17″E
- Country: Poland
- Voivodeship: Lublin
- County: Zamość
- Gmina: Komarów-Osada

Tomaszówka [tɔmaˈʂufka] is a village in the administrative district of Gmina Komarów-Osada, within Zamość County, Lublin Voivodeship, in Eastern Poland.
