= Attack on Variazh =

- Part of Anti-communist resistance in Poland (1944–1953) and Anti-Soviet resistance by UPA
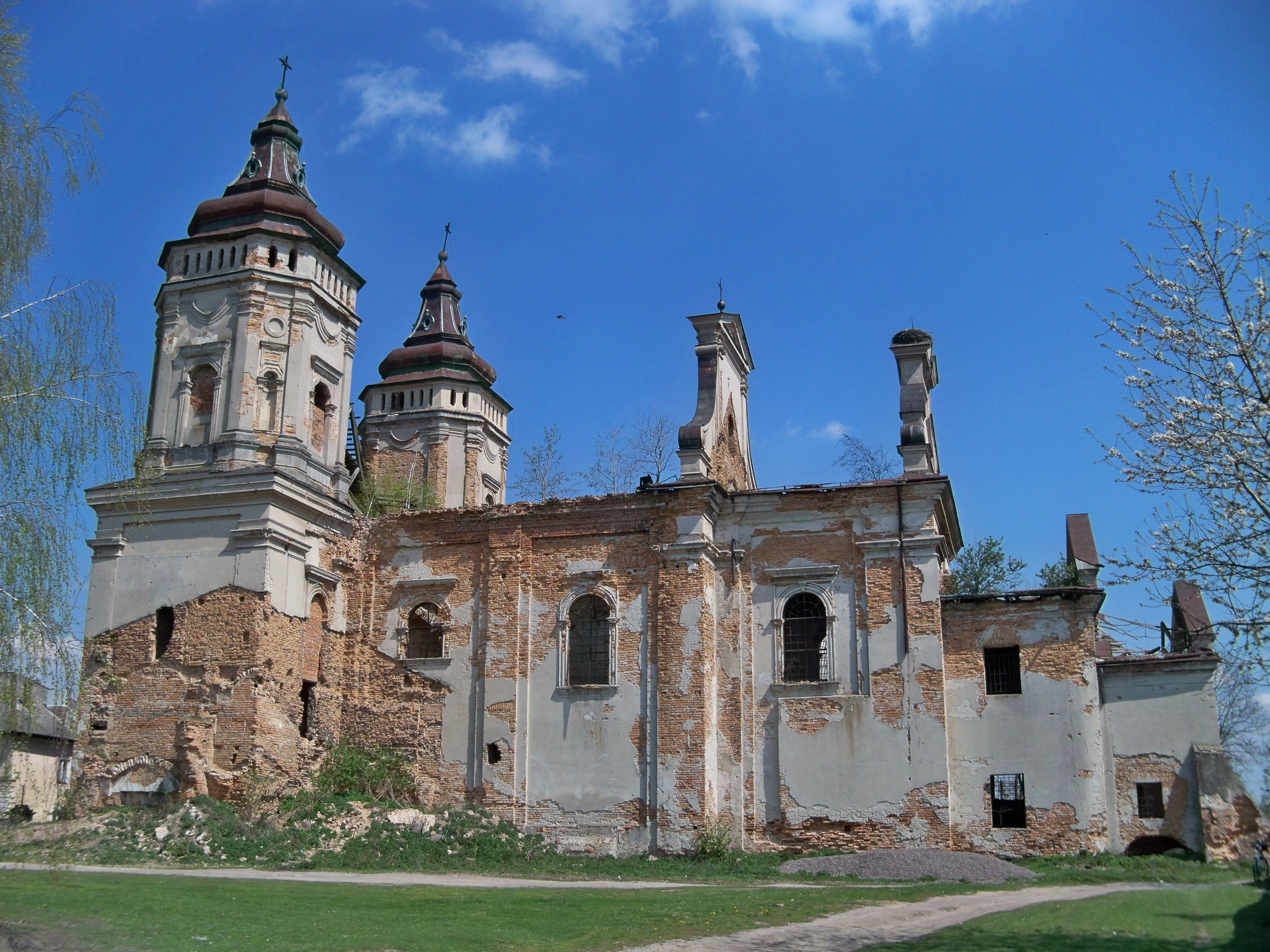
- Church of St. Mark in Variazh
| Date | 27 May 1945 |
| Location | Variazh, Sheptytskyi Raion, Lviv Oblast |
| Result | UPA–AK victory |
| Territorial changes | Temporary control of Variazh |

Belligerents
| Ukrainian Insurgent Army; Cursed soldiers | Citizens' Militia (MO) |

Commanders and leaders
| Maryan Lukasevych | Unknown |

Strength
| Unknown | Unknown |

Casualties and losses
| 1 killed 1 wounded | 8 killed 2 captured |

The Attack on Variazh was a joint action of Ukrainian Insurgent Army (UPA) and former anti-communist Home Army (AK) troops (cursed soldiers) against Citizens' Militia (MO), on 27 May 1945.

== Prelude ==
In the beginning of 1945, Yuriy Lopatynsky was transferred to Galicia, where he met with Roman Shukhevych and conveyed instructions from Stepan Bandera and Mykola Lebed. The instructions called for negotiations with the Polish underground. On April 10, the regional OUN leadership in Zakerzonia issued a decree banning anti-Polish actions. The only exception was Poles fighting on the side of the Soviet Union.

On 21 May, 1945, the Ukrainian Insurgent Army and former AK troops concluded an alliance in the village of Ruda Różaniecka. On 27 May, this was followed by a joint UPA-AK attack on Citizens' Militia (MO) outposts in Variazh, likely a first such major action of the alliance. The insurgents distributed leaflets to the local population to inform them about the new UPA-AK alliance in the area.

== Attack ==
The AK partisans provided a list of communist officials that UPA should go after. The attack begun with UPA destroying MO outposts, with some of the insurgents dressed in Polish uniforms. Insurgents shelled two MO police stations from mortars. UPA searched every house for the people provided on the list.

As a result of attack, insurgents released 20 detained Ukrainians, captured 2 MO policemen, killed 8 officials and troops. Captured policemen were executed in the forest near Radkov after interrogation. Insurgents suffered 1 killed and another wounded as a result of MO shooting from inside the church. However, UPA insurgents didn't shell the church due to civilian presence and wanting to uphold the truce.

== Aftermath ==
During the second UPA attack on Variazh on October 5, 1946, 2 Polish Army soldiers and 4 policemen were killed, 67 residential buildings and over 158 farm buildings were burned down.
