= Polish School of Medicine =

Polish School of Medicine at the University of Edinburgh
- Active: 1941–1949
- Students: 336
- Doctoral students: 19
- Location: Edinburgh
- Language: Polish

The Polish School of Medicine at the University of Edinburgh was established in March 1941. Initially, the idea was to meet the needs of the Polish Armed Forces for doctors but from the outstart, civilian students were admitted. Founded on the basis of an agreement between the Polish Government in Exile and the Senate of The University of Edinburgh this unique wartime initiative enabled students to complete their medical degrees.

The academic staff were mainly Polish professors and academic staff who became refugees after the Invasion of Poland and the Fall of France (in June 1940). They were supported by the Edinburgh University professors.

Professor Antoni Jurasz was the first dean of the Polish School of Medicine. Students were initially taught in Edinburgh Hospitals until October 1941 when, thanks to the generosity of the Edinburgh Council, the Ignacy Jan Paderewski Polish hospital was established. Most of the courses were taught in Polish, followed the Polish curriculum and students were awarded a Polish Degree.

By the time the school closed in 1949, over 336 students had matriculated. 227 had graduated with a medical diploma (MBChB) and 19 doctors (including 12 who had already graduated from the School with the diploma) obtained a doctorate or MD.

After the war only a few graduates returned to Poland while most remained in Britain and some emigrated to the US, Canada and Australia. The Polish School of Medicine at the University of Edinburgh was the only legally operating Polish academic institution during World War II.

== Creation of the Polish School of Medicine ==
After the fall of Poland and subsequently of France, the Polish military forces were relocated to and reorganised in Great Britain. A key issue that emerged was obtaining a suitable number of doctors and pharmacists for the newly forming military units. There were many medical students who had their studies interrupted by the war among these soldiers and servicemen. Importantly there were also professors and academic staff who had taught at medical schools before the war. The initiator of the idea to establish an academic institution that would provide doctors for the polish armed forces was professor Francis Albert Crew who was in charge of the military hospital in Edinburgh. On the Polish side, great supporters of the initiative were Professor Antoni Jurasz (Professor of Surgery at Poznan University) and Professor Tadeusz Sokolowski.

The joint initiative was approved by the authorities of the University of Edinburgh and was subsequently endorsed by the Polish Government in Exile. Professor Antoni Jurasz was chosen to negotiate with the University of Edinburgh on behalf of the Polish government in exile. Simultaneously a committee was appointed to set up the Polish School of Medicine (PSM). Its members were: Professor Stanisław Kot, Professor Antoni Jurasz, Professor Jerzy Fergler, Professor Włodzimierz Koskowski, Professor Tadeusz Rogalski and Lt. Col. Władysław Gergovich MD representing the staff of the Commander in Chief of Polish Forces, General Wladyslaw Sikorski.

The agreement between the Senate of the University of Edinburgh, the Faculty of Medicine and the Polish Organising Committee acknowledged the establishment of the PSM with the following statute:

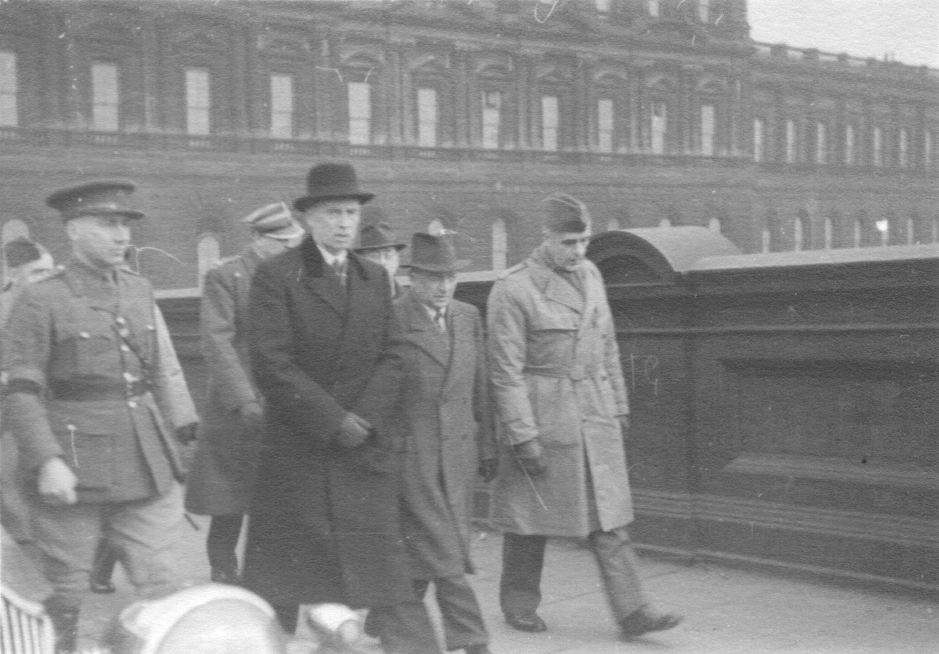
The Creation of the Polish School of Medicine. From right to left: Professor Antoni Jurasz, Minister Stanisław Kot and President of the Polish Government in Exile Wladyslaw Raczkiewicz

1. The Polish School of Medicine will share the same academic laws and regulations as other academic establishments in Poland
2. The PSM shall be free to organise the institution in a similar fashion to universities in Poland.
3. It will have the privilege to assess students’ progress on midterm and final exams as well as to grant higher academic degrees recognised by the Polish Government in Exile.
4. The staff will be recruited from professors and post docs originating from Polish Universities and will be approved by the University of Edinburgh authorities.
5. The seminars and courses not having Polish teachers shall be run by a professor of the University of Edinburgh.

The official agreement between the Polish Government in Exile and the University of Edinburgh was signed on 24 February 1941. The opening paragraph stated:

"The University of Edinburgh on the one part and the Government of Poland on the other part, desiring to strengthen the ties in the cultural domain between Great Britain and Poland, agree to create a Polish School of Medicine at the University of Edinburgh from 24th February 1941."

On the same day, the president of the Polish Government in Exile published a decree announcing the establishment of the Polish School of Medicine. In January 1941 an edict which asked for all medical students to be sent to Edinburgh was published by the General Staff of the Polish Armed Forces (Poland's highest unit of military organisation). Polish newspapers also announced that civilian medical students were welcome to matriculate the PSM to complete their degrees.

On 22 March 1941, the Polish School of Medicine was officially opened by the president of the Polish Government in Exile, Wladyslaw Raczkiewicz.

== Professors and lecturers ==
On the day PSM opened, the following professors, readers and lecturers representing a wide spectrum of medical specialities constituted the academic staff:

- Anatomy Professor Tadeusz Rogalski (1941–46) (Professor University of Kraków)
- Histology Marian Kostowiecki (1941–46)(Senior Lecturer University of Lwow)
- Physics Bernard Czemplik (1941–44) (Poznan University)
- Chemistry Professor Guy Frederick Marrian (The University of Edinburgh), Edmund Mystkowski (1941–45) (Senior Lecturer University of Warsaw), Tadeusz Mann (1941–45)(Senior Lecturer University of Lwow)
- Biology and Genetics Bronisław Śliżyński (1941–46)(Senior Lecturer University of Kraków)
- Physiology and Pathophysiology Professor Jerzy Fegler (1941–47) (Professor University of Wilno)
- Pathology Professor Aleksander Drennan (1941–46) (University of Edinburgh)
- Bacteriology Professor Thomas Jones Mackie (1941–46) (University of Edinburgh)
- Pharmacology Professor Włodzimierz Koskowski (1941–46)(Professor University of Lwow), Tadeusz Dekański (1941–46) (Lecturer at the Military Medical School and Chief of the Medical Department at the Central Training Military Hospital in Warsaw)
- Internal Medicine Professor Leyhourne Stanley Patrick Davidson (1941–49), (University of Edinburgh), Dr Antoni Fidler (Senior Lecturer University of Warsaw) and Dr Wiktor Tomaszewski (1941–49) (Senior Lecturer Poznan University)
- Surgery Professor Antoni Jurasz (1941–47) (Professor University of Poznan), Tadeusz Sokołowski (1941–42) (Head, Orthopaedic Department Warsaw Military Hospital), Roman Rejthar (1941–48) (Senior Assistant University of Poznan)
- Gynaecology and Obstetrics Professor Robert William Johnstone (1941–46) (University of Edinburgh), Czesław Uma (1941–49)(Senior assistant Kraków)
- Paediatrics Professor Charles McNeil (1941–47) (The University of Edinburgh), Zdzisław Małkiewicz (1941–47)(Specialist Children's Diseases, Health Centre Kraków University)
- Neurology and Psychiatry Professor Jakub Rostowski (1941–49) (Professor University of Lwow)
- Dermatology and Venerology Henryk Reiss (1941–47) (Senior Lecturer Dermatology and Venereology University of Kraków
- Otolaryngology Jarosław Iwaszkiewicz (1941–47) (Senior Assistant Poznan University)
- Ophthalmology Jan Ruszkowski (1941–48) (Specialist Ophthalmologist Warsaw University)
- Forensic Medicine Professor Sydney A. Smith (1941–49) (University of Edinburgh)
- Radiology Adam Elektorowicz (1941–47) (Senior Lecturer University of Warsaw), Jan Kochanowski (1941–42) (Head of Xray Department Social Insurance Establishment, Warsaw)
- Dentistry Professor Leon Lakner (1941–47) (Professor Poznan University)

In the first year Professor Bruno Nowakowski (formerly Professor University of Kraków), who arrived from Cyprus, took over the chair of Hygiene (1941–46). During the second year Professor Adam Straszynski took over the chair of Dermatology and Venerology (1942–48) (former Professor University of Poznan). Also during the second year Aleksander Jablonski, a Senior Lecturer in Physics at the University of Warsaw, joined the teaching staff. Finally Wlodzimierz Missiuro (Senior Lecturer University of Warsaw) who arrived in Scotland after he had been released from a Soviet prisoner of war camp, conducted additional lectures in Physiology from 1942 to 1946.

Overall the academic staff of the Polish School of Medicine included: 7 professors and senior lecturers from the Jagiellonian University in Cracow, 7 from the Poznan University, 6 from the University of Lwow, 6 from Warsaw University and 1 from the Vilnius University. Ten staff members of the PSM had no academic role before the onset of WWII.

=== Deans of the Polish School of Medicine ===
1941–1945 Professor Antoni Jurasz

1945–1946 Professor Tadeusz Rogalski

1946–1949 Professor Jakub Rostowski

== Studies and graduates ==
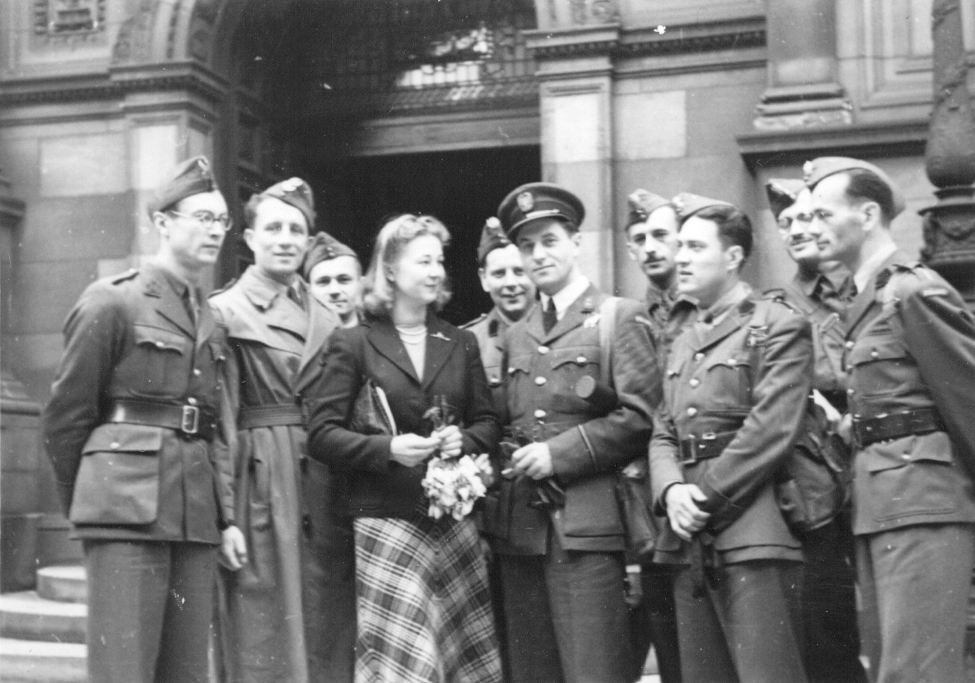
Students of the Polish School of Medicine. In the middle of the picture Dr Konrad Bazarnik – the first PSM graduate on the day of his graduation.

Initially 70 students originating from the military corps and 20 civilians entered medical studies at the PSM. Polish nationals who were matriculated at the Polish School of Medicine (PSM) became full-time University of Edinburgh students and therefore enjoyed the same privileges as regular Edinburgh University students. Their studies, including the fee of £2.50, were funded by the Polish authorities. From the very beginning, thanks to the tireless efforts of the staff members, the courses at the PSM were very highly regarded by the University of Edinburgh authorities. Students attended seminars and lectures within the College of Medicine buildings at Bristo Street and clinical training took place at the Royal Infirmary, Royal Sick Children Hospital and the City Hospital. From October 1941 students were also taught in the Paderewski Hospital, located in the grounds of the Western General Hospital. Under Defence regulation 32B the General Medical Council was able to register doctors who had qualified in countries such as Poland temporarily. In 1941 such doctors could be placed on the Medical Register and in 1947 they were placed on the permanent register under the Medical Practitioners and Pharmacists Act 1947 (11 & 12 Geo. 6. c. 11). As the British authorities recognised the right of Polish professors to work as doctors in the UK during the war, this allowed them to teach the students within Scottish wards. On a day-to-day basis Polish nationals encountered great support from the Scottish community. In December 1941 student accommodation for PSM students opened at Grosvenor Crescent, in the city centre. On 17 July 1941 (only four months after the PSM was established) the first medical degree was awarded to a former Kraków Jagiellonian University medical student, Konrad Bazarnik. On 12 December 1941 further degrees were granted to Wladyslaw Galuszka, Jadwiga Mickiewicz, Ferdynand Solich and Stanislaw Sychta. The Polish School of Medicine students joined the Polish military forces after graduation.

== Closure ==
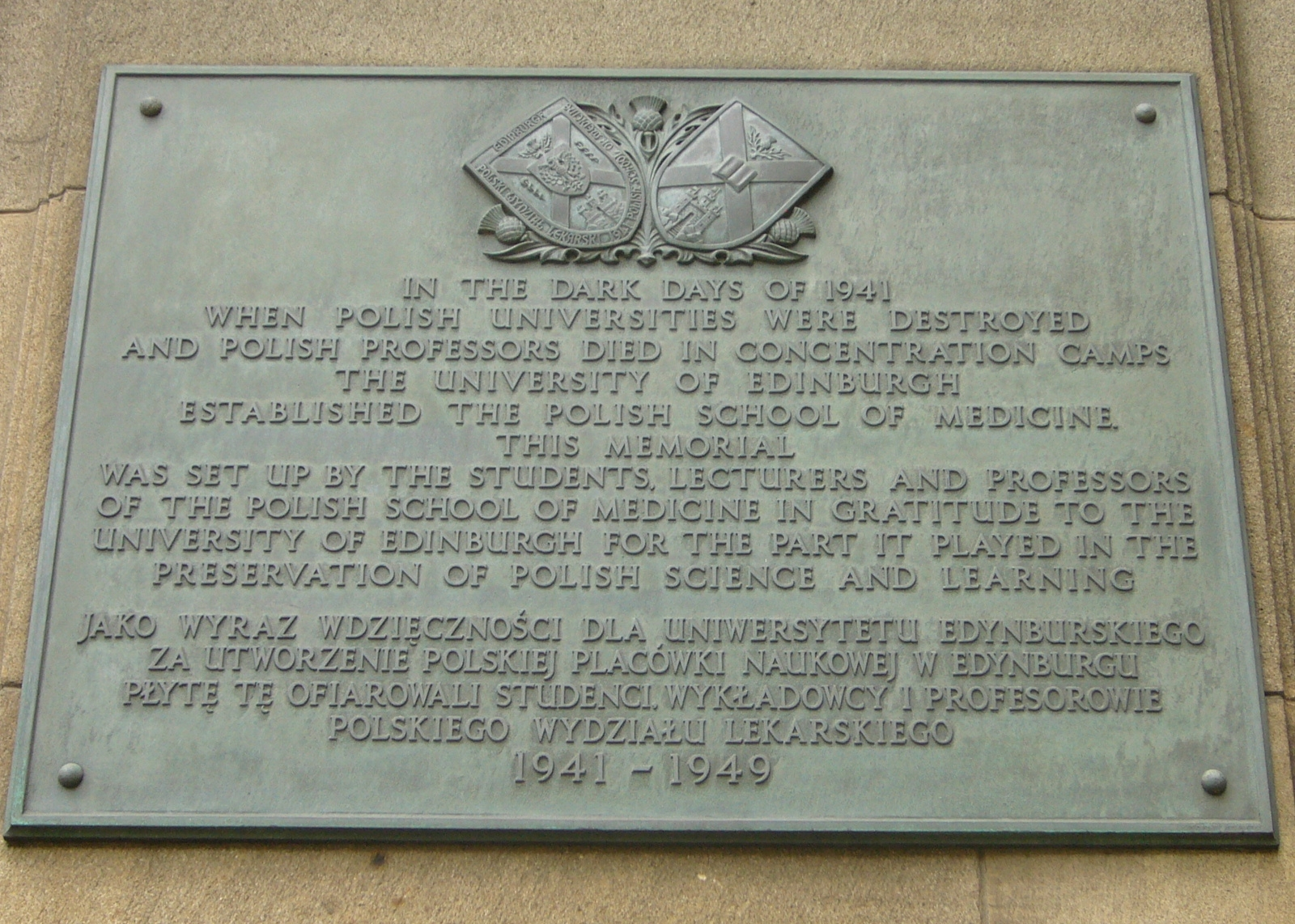
Polish School of Medicine plaque, Edinburgh Medical School Teviot Place

After the end of World War II the founders of the PSM had to face the problem of its future. On 5 July 1945 the British Government withdrew its recognition of the Polish Government in Exile as the legitimate Polish government of Poland. As a result, the University of Edinburgh and the PSM authorities determined that the function of the school should be gradually curtailed and that there should be no more admissions to the school. Those who were already studying in Edinburgh would be allowed to complete their education.

While in the academic year 1944/45 the total number of students was 246 this fell to 209 (73 females and 136 males) in 1945/1946. In the following 3 years the academic initiative was wound down and then ceased altogether. In 1946 thirty-three 3rd year students were transferred to British universities. From then on, PSM had only 67 fourth and 78 fifth year students. The doors finally closed on 30 March 1949. During the 8 years of its activity 336 medical students were matriculated, 237 completed their studies, 227 were awarded a medical degree (MBChB) and 19 obtained an MD or PhD. A total of 49 student withdrew from the studies and 23 were expelled due to unsatisfactory progress. Doctors affiliated with the PSM published 121 scientific papers in medical journals. PSM's library comprised 1076 volumes, which were transferred to the University of Warsaw Library and the Polish Library in London after the war.

On 15 November 1949 Dean Jakub Rostowski unveiled a memorial plaque in the Medical Quadrangle (Teviot Place). On the memorial board there is an inscription in both English and Polish: "In the dark days of 1941 when Polish Universities were destroyed and Polish Professors died in concentration camps, the University of Edinburgh established the Polish School of Medicine. This memorial was set up by the students, lecturers and professors of the Polish School of Medicine in gratitude to the University of Edinburgh for the part it played in the preservation of Polish science and learning."

== Post-war alumni life ==
After the war a vast majority of the PSM graduates decided not to return to Poland. In the years that followed the 209 alumni encountered several difficulties in finding suitable medical vacancies in the UK. With the big numbers of UK doctors coming back to the country, Polish doctors were in a difficult position. The situation was even more challenging because initially the Polish School of Medicine degrees were not recognised by the General Medical Council. The situation changed on 18 December 1947, when the British parliament passed (approved?) the Medical Practitioners and Pharmacists Act, 1947 which allowed PSM alumni to register and work as doctors in the UK. With the limited possibilities for satisfactory positions in Great Britain many PSM graduates ended up working outside Europe within the commonwealth (i.e. Henryk Podlewski, Lukasz Kulczycki, Jean Kryszek, Wladyslaw Aleksander Wielhorski). Overall eventually 128 doctors settled in Great Britain. Some of them were very successful in their medical careers. Professor Henryk Urich became the head of the department of Neuropathology within the London Hospital Medical School. Henryk Maslowski was the head of Neurosurgery in Manchester. At least 11 graduates remained or returned to Edinburgh after a period in the British Colonial Service – Józef Goldberg, Kazimierz Durkacz, Stefan Adamczewski, Dawid Becher, Władysław Kluger, Maria Dobroszycka, Janina Ciekałowska, Władysław Koźmiński, Kazimierz Kuczyński, Krystyna Munk, Tadeusz Michał Kraszewski (after returning from Borneo) and Wiktor Tomaszewski. Many of the graduates stayed in the Far East and Africa (Jean Kryszek), a big number of alumni settled in the United States and Canada.

Eighteen graduates of the PSM decided to return to Poland after their studies. Some of them later continued as academics obtaining their MDs, PhDs and eventually becoming professors. Dr Olech Szczepski was the head of the department of paediatrics at the Poznan University of Medical Sciences, became a Professor and served as the Rector of that University. Doctor Antoni Kepinski was the head of the Psychiatry department at the Jagiellonian University in Cracow. He is the founder of Information Metabolism which is a psychological theory of human social interactions based on information processing.

== Legacy ==
In 1966 the graduates of the PSM held their first worldwide reunion. Since then they have held similar gatherings in Edinburgh every 5 years thus keeping the spirit of the school alive and maintaining their friendship and close links with The University of Edinburgh. During the 2016 anniversary celebrations the University of Edinburgh Chancellors presented honorary degrees to 3 individuals who have played a key role in keeping the spirit of the School alive and developing the academic links between Edinburgh University and Polish medical universities and research institutes. The School's coordinator Dr Maria Dlugolecka-Graham, the President of Poznan University of Medical Sciences, Professor Jacek Wysocki and the Vice-Rektor of the Jagiellonian University, Professor Piotr Laidler were presented with this award.

In 1986 on the 45th anniversary of the founding of the Polish School the graduates set up the Polish School of Medicine Memorial Fund. An initiative that was intended to acknowledge the tremendous help the university had given to Poles during WWII and to foster links between the University of Edinburgh and Polish medical universities. Income from the Fund provides scholarships for talented Polish medical scientists working in Polish medical universities and research institutes to come to Edinburgh to undertake further study or research. Up to date over 80 Polish medical scientists have benefited from the scheme. The Fund also supports the Professor Antoni Jurasz lectureship, allowing a nominated Head of Department from Edinburgh Medical School to give a lecture in Poznan and one other Polish medical university. Also during the 1986 reunion Dr Wiktor Tomaszewski, who had been a senior member of staff at the PSM and then became Edinburgh GP, established the Polish School of Medicine Historical Collection. The Collection is now under the care of Edinburgh University Collections Division. It contains many medals of medical interest, sculptures, paintings, photographs and books about the School, and other artefacts. Many of the items were donated by Polish medical universities, former students, staff and graduates of the Polish School and by Dr Tomaszewski himself. Part of the Collection is on view in the Polish Room within the Chancellor's Building at the Little France Campus of the University of Edinburgh.
