= Gmina Komarów-Osada =

Gmina Komarów-Osada Komarów-Osada Commune
- Gmina
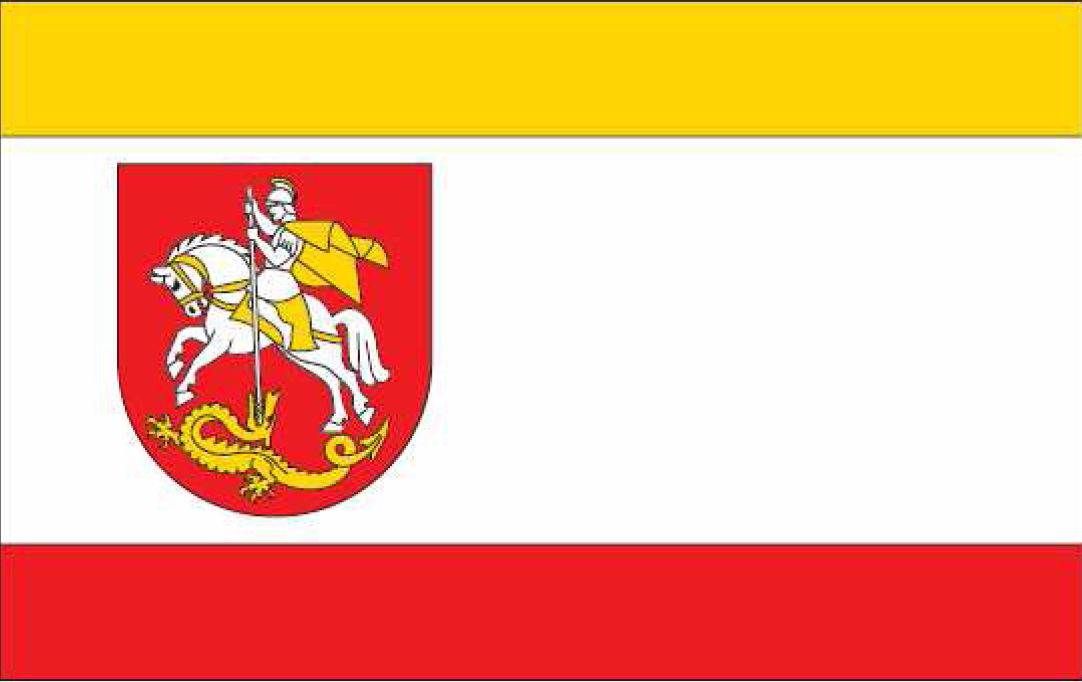
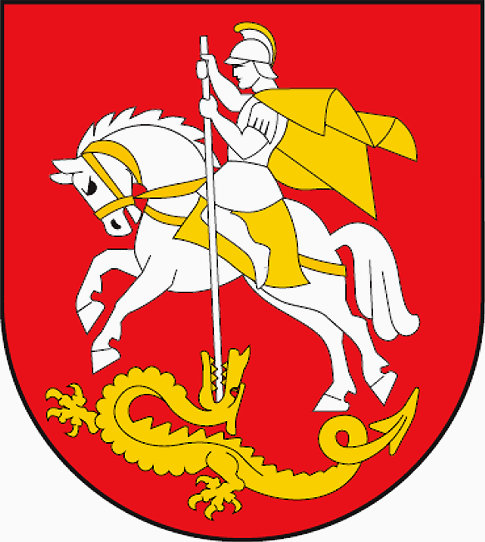
- Flag Coat of arms
- Interactive map of Gmina Komarów-Osada
- Coordinates (Komarów-Osada): 50°38′N 23°29′E
- Country: Poland
- Voivodeship: Lublin
- County: Zamość County
- Seat: Komarów-Osada

Area
  - Total: 122.79 km^{2} (47.41 sq mi)

Population (2013)
  - Total: 5,323
  - Density: 43.35/km^{2} (112.3/sq mi)
- Website: https://www.komarow.pl

Gmina Komarów-Osada is a rural gmina (administrative district) in Zamość County, Lublin Voivodeship, in eastern Poland. Its seat is the village of Komarów-Osada, which lies approximately 19 kilometres (12 mi) south-east of Zamość and 94 km (58 mi) south-east of the regional capital Lublin.

The gmina covers an area of 122.79 square kilometres (47.4 sq mi), and as of 2006 its total population is 5,552 (5,323 in 2013).

== Villages ==
Gmina Komarów-Osada contains the villages and settlements of Antoniówka, Huta Komarowska, Janówka Wschodnia, Janówka Zachodnia, Kadłubiska, Komarów Dolny, Komarów Górny, Komarów-Osada, Komarów-Wieś, Kraczew, Krzywystok, Krzywystok-Kolonia, Księżostany, Księżostany-Kolonia, Ruszczyzna, Śniatycze, Sosnowa-Dębowa, Swaryczów, Tomaszówka, Tuczapy, Wolica Brzozowa, Wolica Brzozowa-Kolonia, Wolica Śniatycka, Zubowice and Zubowice-Kolonia.

== Neighbouring gminas ==
Gmina Komarów-Osada is bordered by the gminas of Krynice, Łabunie, Miączyn, Rachanie, Sitno and Tyszowce.
