= Kraków Cavalry Brigade =

Kraków Cavalry Brigade (Krakowska Brygada Kawalerii) was a unit of the Polish Army, created on April 1, 1937. Its headquarters were located in Kraków, but some units were stationed in other places:

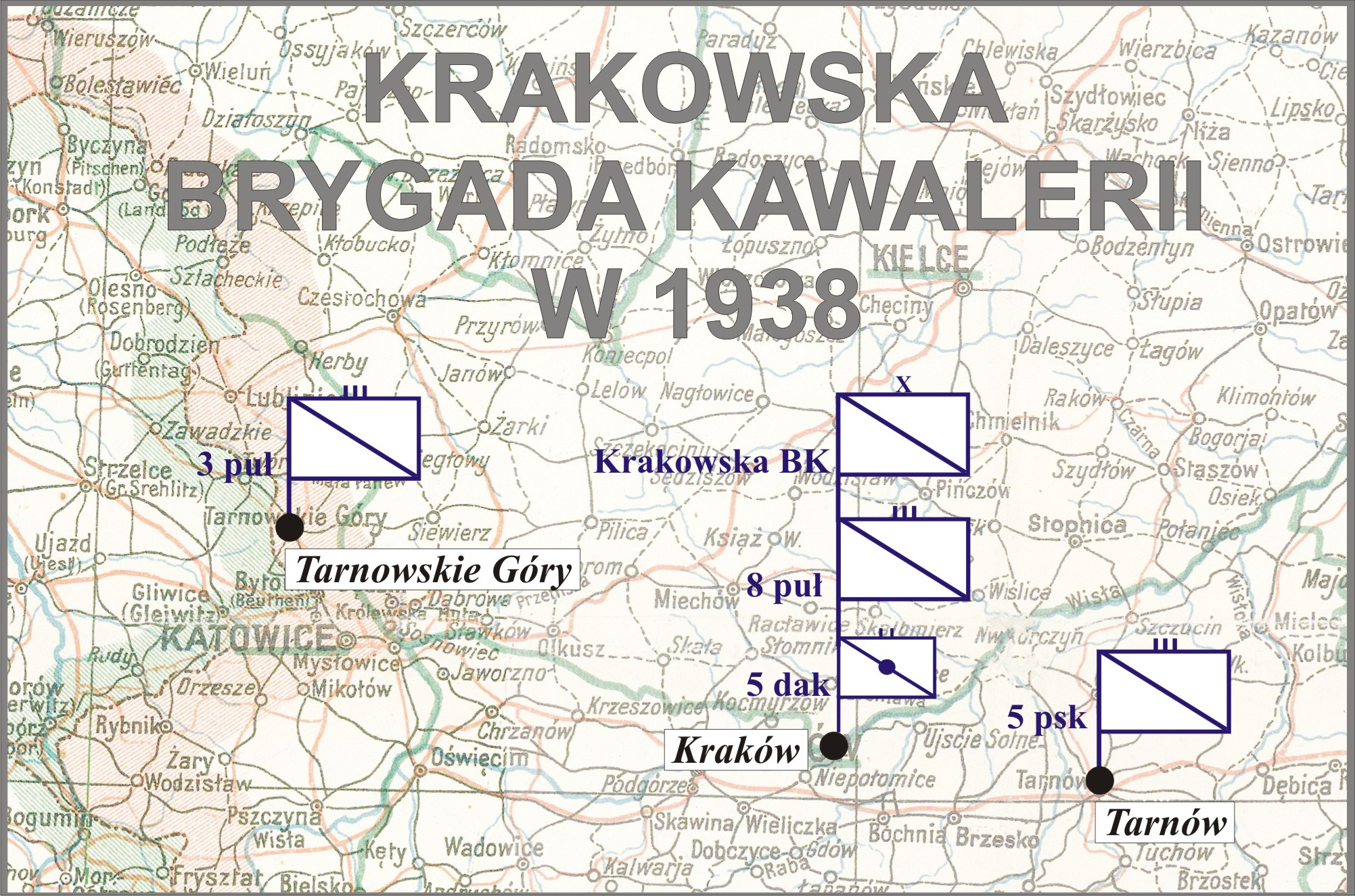
Krakowska BK w 1938

- 3rd Silesian Uhlan Regiment, in Tarnowskie Góry
- 8th Uhlan Regiment of Duke Jozef Poniatowski, in Kraków
- 5th Mounted Rifles Regiment, in Tarnów and after 1938 in Dębica
- 5th Mounted Artillery Regiment, in Oświęcim

During the Polish September Campaign, the Brigade, under General Zygmunt Piasecki, was part of Armia Kraków, defending the area between Zabkowice and Częstochowa. In the first days of September 1939, its defence lines were broken by the 10th Army (Wehrmacht), with one of its regiments overwhelmed. This opened the way for the German advance on Warsaw.

The battle took place around Zawiercie and Woźniki, and after the defeat, the Poles withdrew towards the line of the Nida River and to the towns of Miechów and Pińczów. The Poles were continuously chased and attacked by German 2nd Light Division.

On September 10, the Division crossed the Vistula near Baranów Sandomierski. Then, it fought in the Battle of Tomaszów Lubelski, in the area of Biłgoraj and Tarnogród. Surrounded by the enemy, it capitulated together with remnants of the Army Kraków.

== See also ==
- Polish army order of battle in 1939
- Polish contribution to World War II
- Wołyńska Cavalry Brigade
- Mazowiecka Cavalry Brigade
