= Battle of Ulhówek and Rzeczyca =

1944 battle between Polish and Ukrainian guerillas

- Part of the Polish–Ukrainian ethnic conflict during World War II
Date	1–2 June 1944
Location	Ulhówek and Rzeczyca, Tomaszów County, Lublin Voivodeship
Result	See § Aftermath
Territorial changes	Withdrawal of Polish troops beyond the Huczwa River

Belligerents
Home Army; Peasant Battalions	Ukrainian Insurgent Army; 1st Galician SS; Luftwaffe

Commanders and leaders
Zenon Jachymek	Marian Łukasiewicz

Units involved
Operational Group “Łódź”: Military District “Tomaszów Mazowiecki”; Military Inspectorate “Piotrków Trybunalski”	Northern Operational Group: 3rd Operational Group “Turiv”; Western Operational Group: 6th Operational Group “Syan”

Strength
3,000	At least 500

Casualties and losses
71 killed; 100 wounded Heavy	Unknown
- 93 Ukrainian civilians killed

The Battle of Ulhówek and Rzeczyca (Polish: Bitwa pod Ulhówkiem i Rzeczycą, Ukrainian: Бої під Ульгувіком і Жечицею; 1–2 June 1944) was fought between the Military Inspectorate “Piotrków Trybunalski” and Military District “Tomaszów Mazowiecki” in the Operational Group “Łódź” of the Home Army and Peasant Battalions under the command of Zenon Jachymek against the 3rd Operational Group “Turiv” in the Northern Operational Group 6th Operational Group “Syan” in the Western Operational Group of the Ukrainian Insurgent Army, Third Reich and 14th Grenadier Division of the Waffen–SS “Galicia” of the villages of Ulhówek and Rzeczyca in the Tomaszów County of the Lublin Voivodeship.

== Background ==
In March 1944 the Home Army and Peasant Battalions led by Zenon Jachymek and Stanisław Basaj started the largest anti-Ukrainian action of the Polish Underground State named the Hrubieszów revolution, the result of the event was the killing of 1,969 Ukrainians, according to claims of the Ukrainian nationalists.

On May 21 the UPA tried to attack Narol however the attack failed and UPA attackers had to go back to their positions.

In May 1944, the commander of the combat sabotage units, Captain Zenon Jachymek, alias "Wiktor", approached the commander of the Tomaszów District of the Home Army, Wilhelm Szczepankiewicz, "Drugak", with another proposal to conduct a counteroffensive in the eastern sector of defense. On May 30, 1944, a briefing for Polish units was held in a forester's hut in the Bukovets Forest to discuss the planned operation preceding the ukrainian offensive. In accordance with the developed plan, the headquarters of the district commander, Major "Druhak," began mobilizing field platoons and companies, replenishing ammunition supplies, and setting up first aid stations.

A Ukrainian garrison about 400 fighters was deployed near Lhuvek, in the village of Zhechitsa.

== Aftermath ==
As a result of the offensive, the armed units of the Home Army and Peasant Battalions didn’t achieve their military goals and could not break the strong defense of the Ukrainian Insurgent Army and retreated with heavy losses across the Huczwa River. The Polish AK partisans lost 71 killed and approximately 100 wounded. Despite the failure of the offensive, it prevented the UPA from making any deep inroads into the Zamość County.

== Legacy ==
In the 50th anniversary of the battle a monument was built for the partisans of the Home Army and Peasant Battalions who took part in the battles from the 2nd to the 5th of April and the 2nd of June. the battle of Rzeczyca was added in 2017, along with 21 other places to the Tomb of the Unknown Soldier in Warsaw.
