= Sosnowa-Dębowa =

- Village
- Location within Poland
- Coordinates: 50°36′19″N 23°32′33″E
- Country: Poland
- Voivodeship: Lublin
- County: Zamość
- Gmina: Komarów-Osada
- Population: 140

Sosnowa-Dębowa [sɔsˈnɔva dɛmˈbɔva] is a village in the administrative district of Gmina Komarów-Osada, within Zamość County, Lublin Voivodeship, in eastern Poland.
