= Huta Komarowska =

- Village
- Location within Poland
- Coordinates: 50°36′N 23°24′E
- Country: Poland
- Voivodeship: Lublin
- County: Zamość
- Gmina: Komarów-Osada

Huta Komarowska [ˈxuta kɔmaˈrɔfska] is a village in the administrative district of Gmina Komarów-Osada, within Zamość County, Lublin Voivodeship, in southeastern Poland.
