= Tuczapy, Zamość County =

Tuczapy
- Village
- Location within Poland
- Coordinates: 50°38′38″N 23°34′21″E
- Country: Poland
- Voivodeship: Lublin
- County: Zamość
- Gmina: Komarów-Osada

Tuczapy [tuˈt͡ʂapɨ] is a village in the administrative district of Gmina Komarów-Osada, within Zamość County, Lublin Voivodeship, in eastern Poland.
