= Zubowice =

- Village
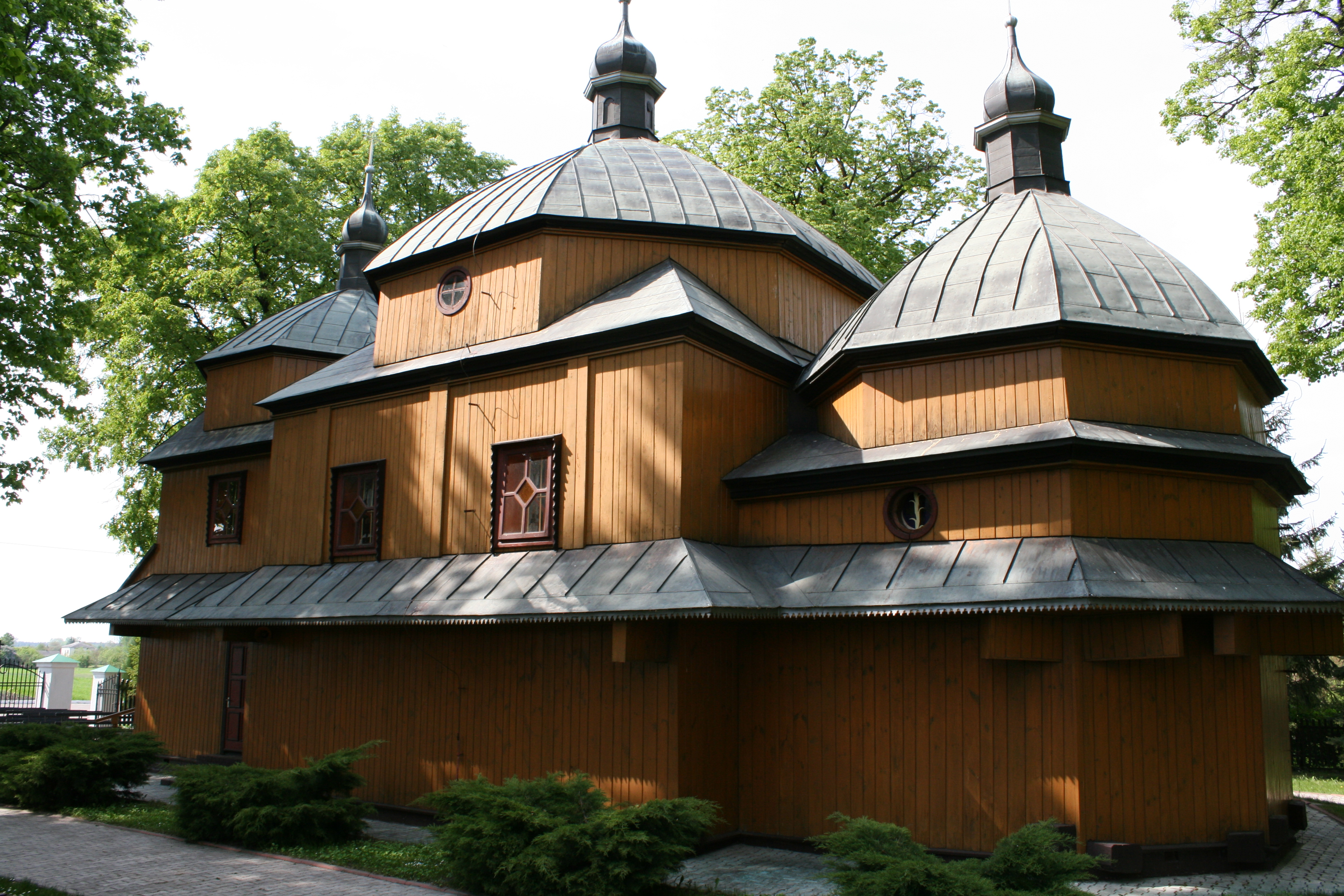
- Church of Archangel Saint Michael

- Location within Poland
- Coordinates: 50°37′N 23°34′E
- Country: Poland
- Voivodeship: Lublin
- County: Zamość
- Gmina: Komarów-Osada

Population
  - Total: 560

Zubowice [zubɔˈvit͡sɛ] is a village in the administrative district of Gmina Komarów-Osada, within Zamość County, Lublin Voivodeship, in eastern Poland.
