= Stanisław Kaczor-Batowski =

Polish painter

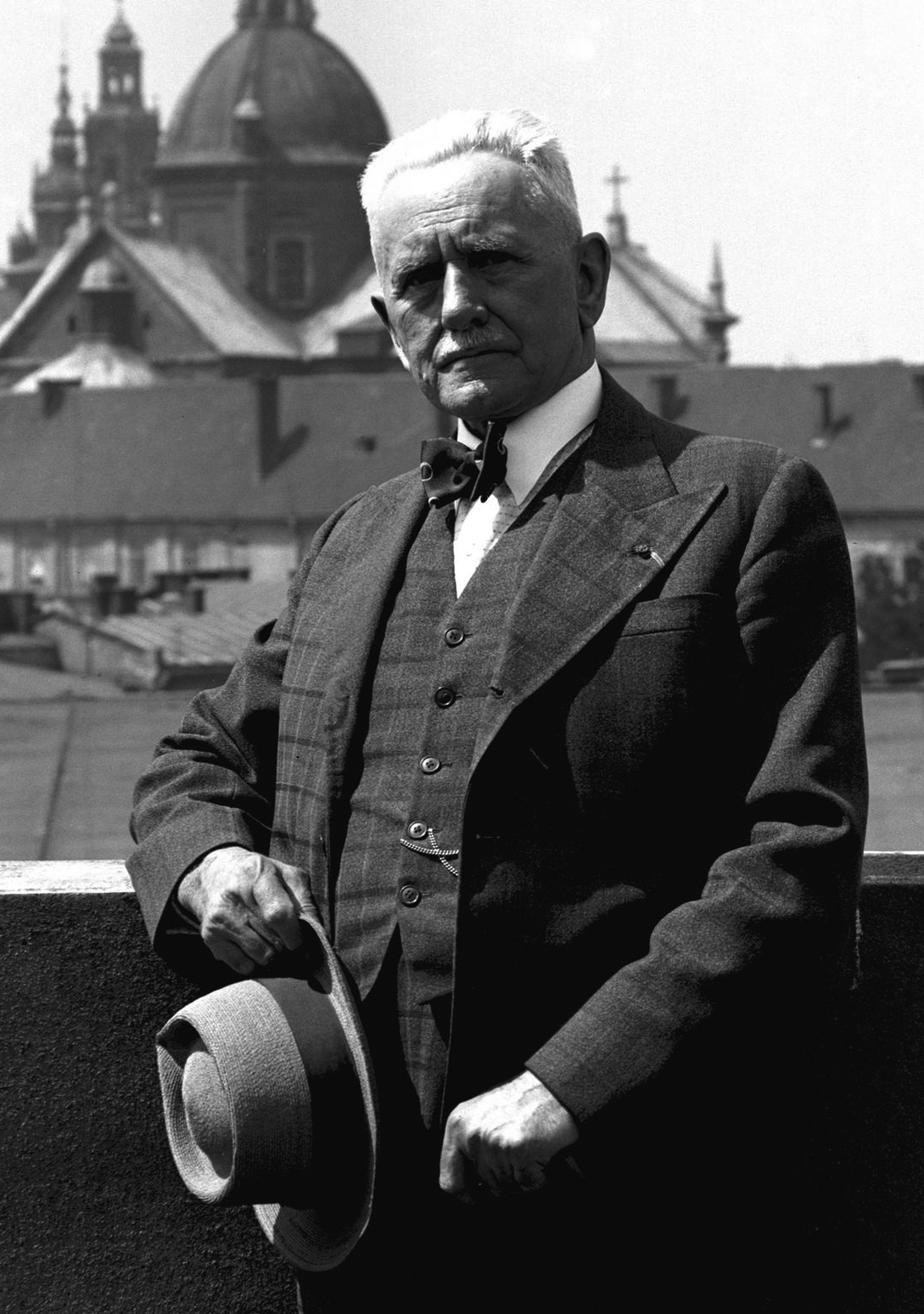
Kaczor-Batowski in 1930

Stanisław Kaczor-Batowski (29 January 1866 – 5/12 May 1946) was a Polish painter who specialised in realist and romanticist works. Born in Lwów (then Lemberg in Austro-Hungarian Galicia, now Lviv, Ukraine), in 1885 he graduated from the Kraków-based Academy of Fine Arts. A student of Florian Cynk and Władysław Łuszczkiewicz, he moved to Vienna and then Munich, where he studied under the tutelage of Alexander von Liezen-Mayer between 1887 and 1889. He also spent a brief time in Paris and Rome before returning to his natal Lwów, where he spent the rest of his life. From 1903 to 1914 he ran his own painting school in Lviv.

A fan of Henryk Sienkiewicz, Juliusz Słowacki and Jan Matejko, Kaczor-Batowski specialized in historicist paintings, usually related to Poland's martial history. Among the best known of his works is the Polish Thermopylae (Battle of Zadwórze) and Pułaski at Savannah. The last painting is currently owned and permanently displayed at The Polish Museum in Chicago. He is also notable as the designer of the stuccos and frescoes for the Grand Theatre in Lwów (modern Theatre of Lviv). In addition to painted landscapes, portraits and religious paintings, Batowski made a series of illustrations for The Trilogy by Henryk Sienkiewicz.

== Gallery ==
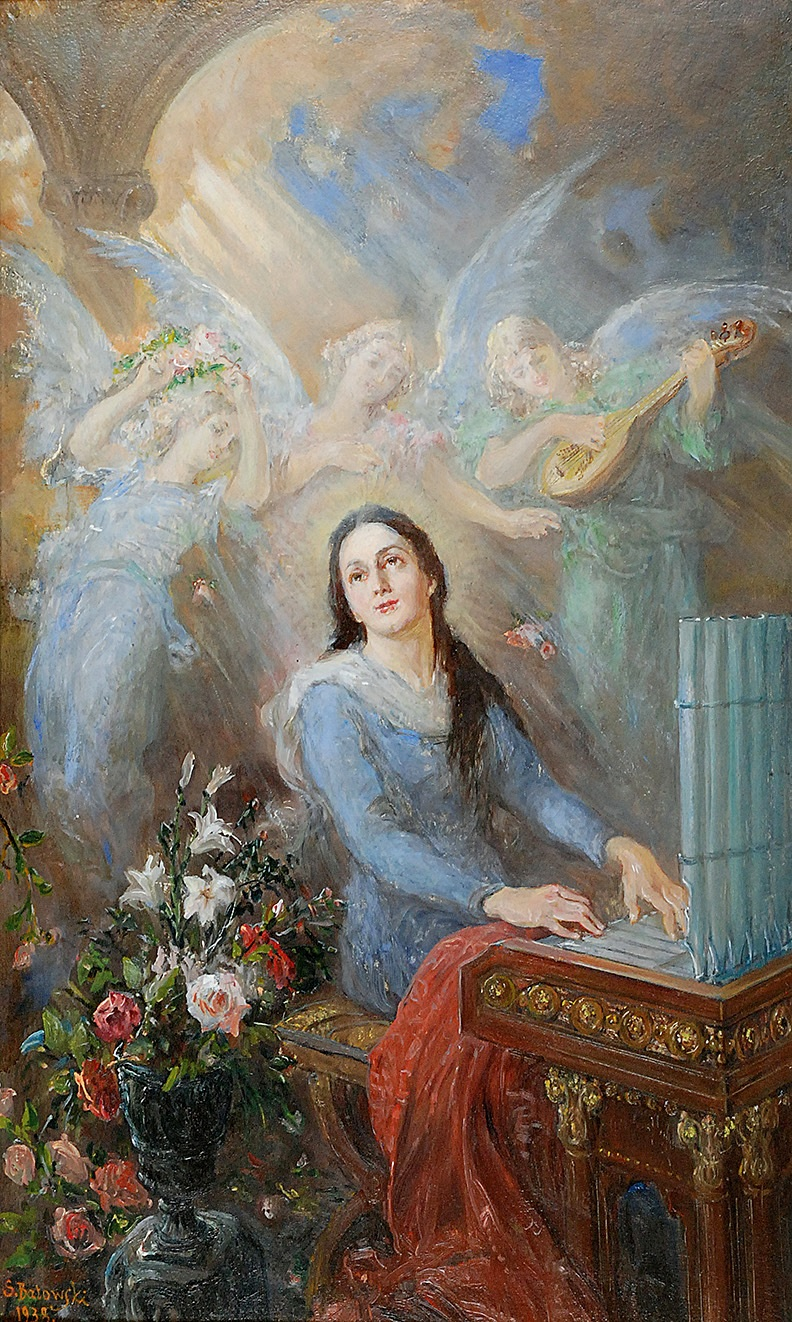
Saint Cecilia

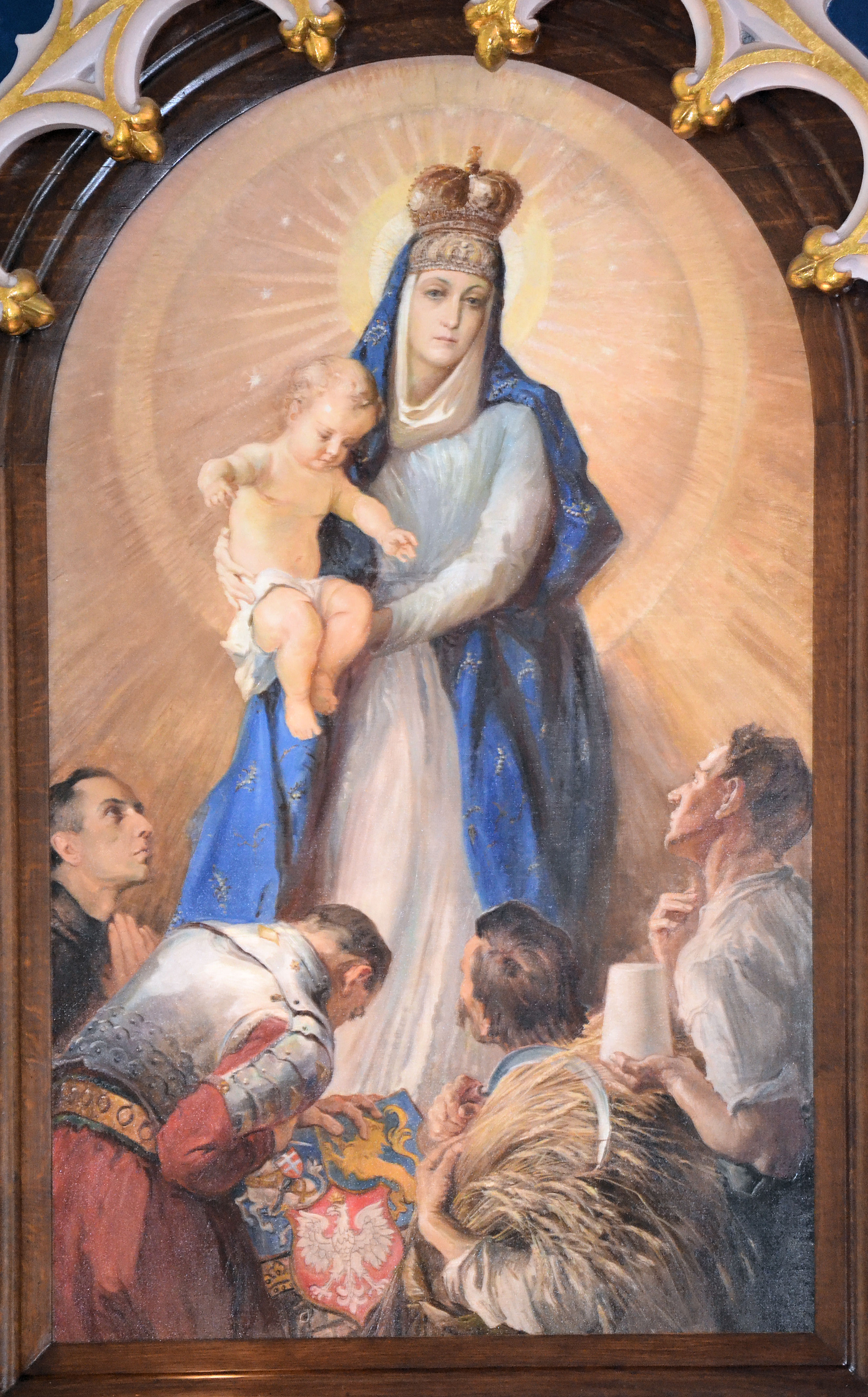
Altar of the Virgin Mary

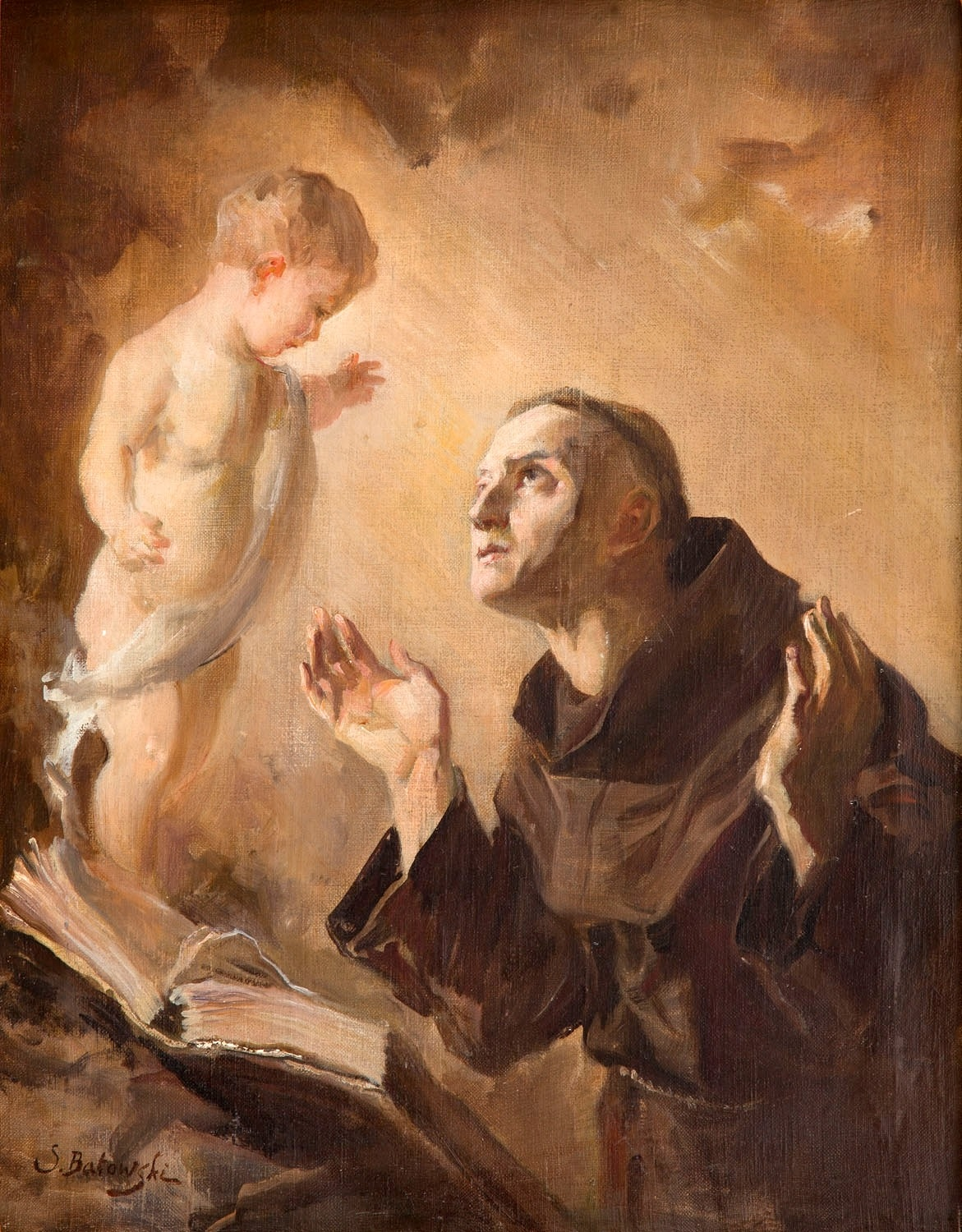
Saint Anthony of Padua
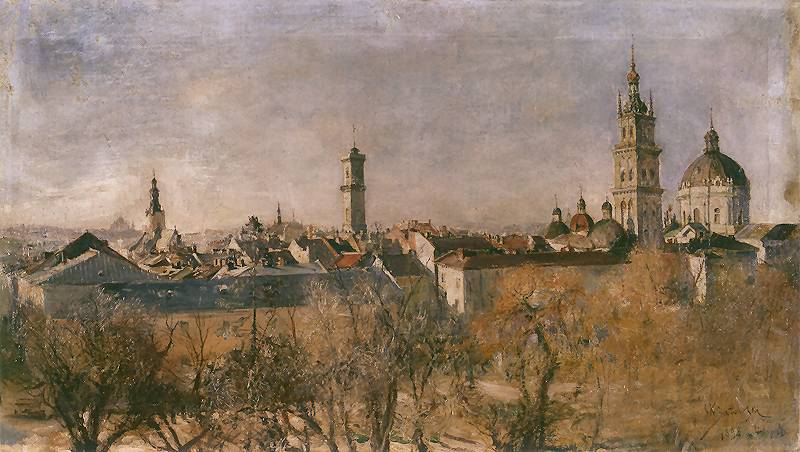
A view of Lwów

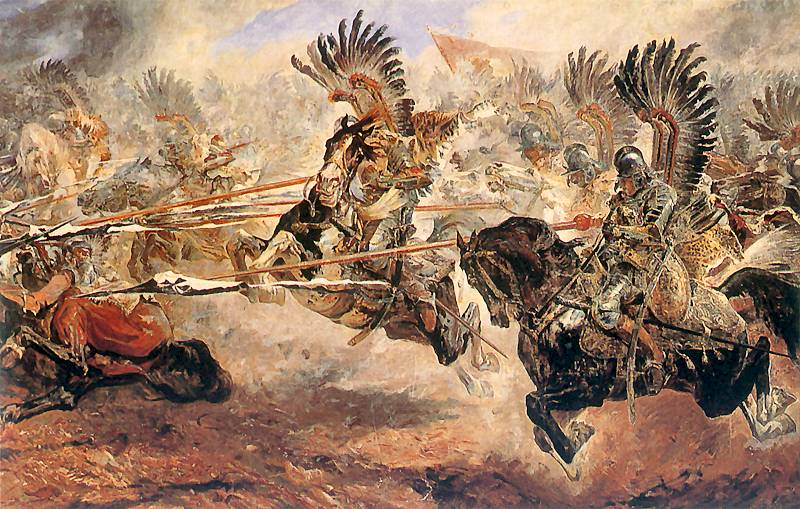
The hussar charge

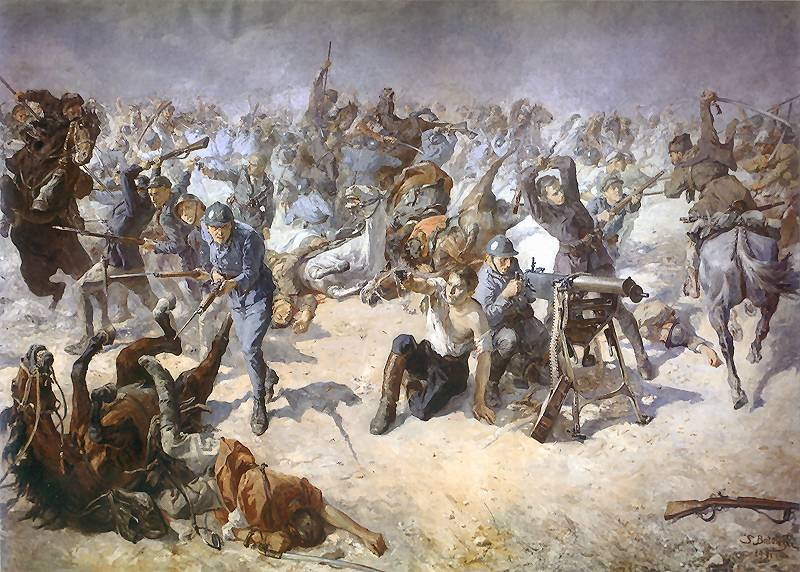
Defence of Zadwórze from the Bolsheviks
