= Battle of Zadwórze =

1920 Polish–Soviet War battle

Coordinates: 49°53′20″N 24°26′08″E

- Part of Polish–Soviet War
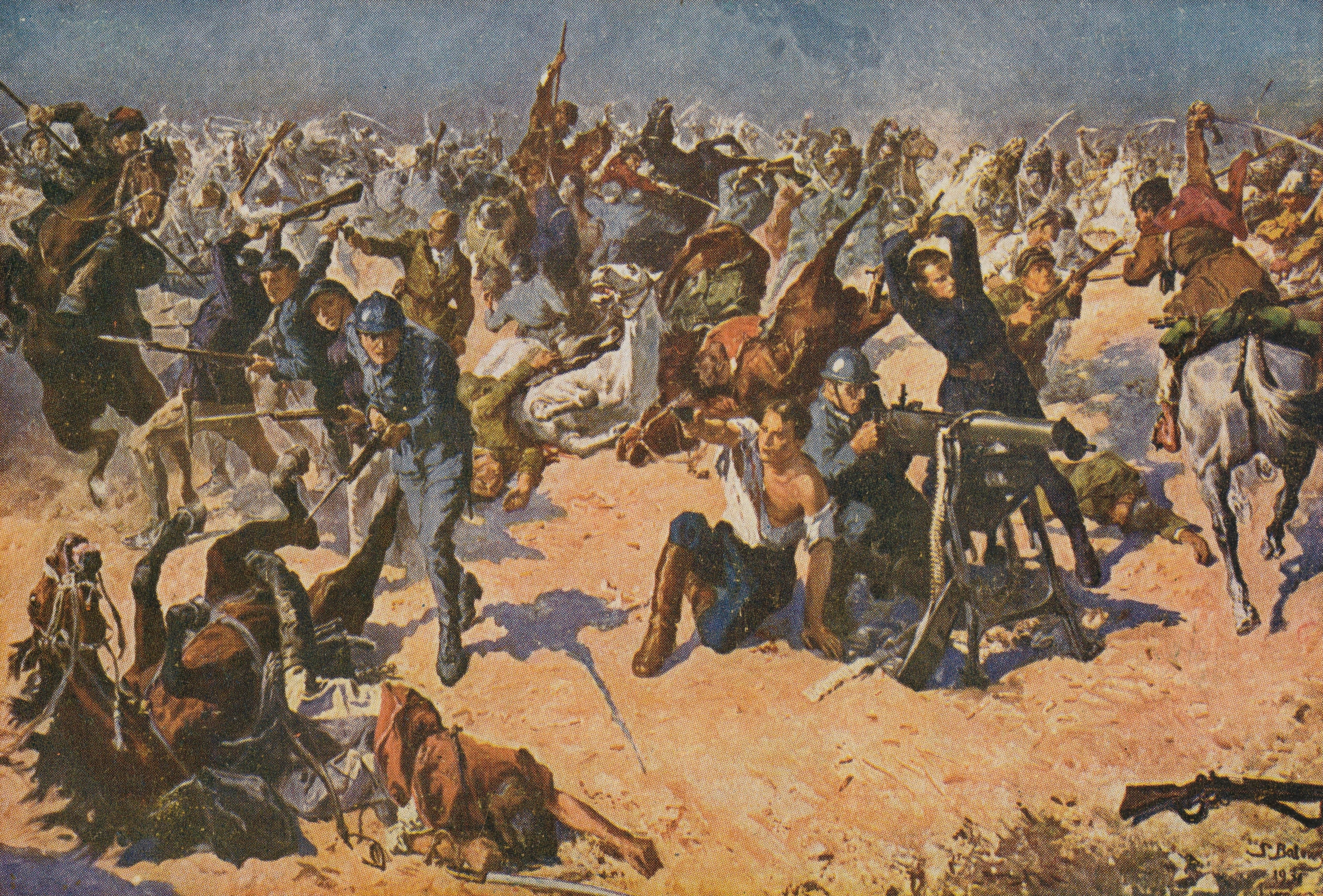
- Battle of Zadwórze a 1929 painting by Stanisław Kaczor-Batowski
Date	17 August 1920
Location	Zadviria, near Lwów
Result	See Aftermath

Belligerents
Poland	Russian SFSR

Commanders and leaders
Bolesław Zajączkowski †	Semyon Budyonny

Strength
330	1st Cavalry Army

Casualties and losses
318 dead	Unknown

Battle of Zadwórze (sometimes referred to as the "Polish Thermopylae") took place during the Polish-Soviet War. It was fought on 17 August 1920, near the railway station of Zadwórze, a small village located 33 kilometres from the city centre of Lwów (now Lviv). The battle, lasting roughly 24 hours, resulted in the complete destruction of the Polish forces but at the same time halted the Soviet advance, preventing the forces of Semyon Budyonny from seizing Lwów and so contributing to the successful defence of Warsaw. The battle has been called a Polish Thermopylae.

== History ==
=== Eve of the battle ===
By mid-August 1920, the Red Army broke all Polish lines of defense and was marching towards Warsaw. The Polish headquarters prepared a plan to counter-attack the Red Army on its left flank from the Wieprz River area, in what became known as the Battle of Warsaw. To gather enough forces for the offensive, Gen. Józef Piłsudski, Polish Commander in Chief, ordered all available units to move to the Wieprz area and withdrew a number of formations from the Polish Southern Front, leaving only two-and-a-half infantry divisions to oppose the 12th Red Army and Budyonny's cavalry. The city of Lwów was left with merely token forces defending the Upper Bug River line against three Russian armies (9th, 13th and 14th).

After several days of heavy fighting, the 1st Cavalry Army under Siemion Budionnyi broke through Polish lines of defense and started its march towards Lwów. The civilian inhabitants of the city started to organize resistance and build field fortifications, anticipating a long siege. Several thousand civilians, mostly students and veterans of the 1918 Battle of Lwów, volunteered for the self-defense units. Ill-equipped detachments were sent towards the front line and fought in several battles, including at Kamionka Strumiłowa, Ruda Sielecka, Chodaczków, Krasne, Busk, Biłka Szlachecka, Kurowice, Streptów, Zuchorzyce and Laszki Królewskie, but were unable to stop the numerically and technologically superior forces of the Red Army.

=== Battle ===
Among the volunteer units organized in Lwów was a group of soldiers of Major Roman Abraham. On the morning of 16 August the 1st Battalion of the 54th Kresy Rifles Infantry Regiment was sent from Lwów towards the village of Nowosiółki (west of the town of Krasne) in order to help the endangered units formed by Roman Abraham. Upon its arrival, the battalion found the town occupied by the Red Army and recaptured it. However, the following day it was endangered by encirclement and was ordered to withdraw towards Lwów. In the morning of 17 August it was taken by surprise near a train station in the village of Zadwórze and was completely destroyed by forces of the 6th Cavalry Division of the 1st Cavalry Army. All Polish soldiers, approximately 200, were killed or missing.

At the same time, a battalion of approximately 500 volunteers organized by Roman Abraham under command of Captain Bolesław Zajączkowski was marching from Krasne along the Lwów-Tarnopol railroad. On 17 August, shortly before noon, when the group reached the village of Kutkorz, it was attacked with machine gun fire from the nearby village of Zadwórze. Capt. Zajączkowski ordered his men to form a line and started an assault towards the village. After a short fight, 330 Poles captured the train station. However, the village was not taken and soon the Polish forces were counter-attacked by units of the 6th Cavalry Division.

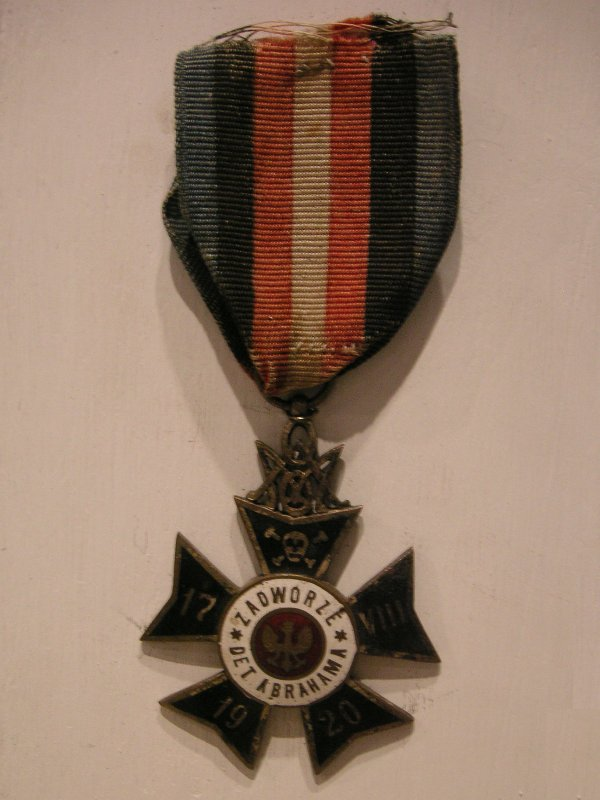
Battle of Zadwórze commemorative medal

By dusk, the Poles' ammunition was almost completely depleted, yet the Polish unit managed to repel six consecutive cavalry charges. Captain Zajączkowski decided that further defense of the station was impossible and ordered his units to retreat towards Lwów. However, the retreat was halted by three Bolshevik airplanes strafing the Polish defenders. After suffering heavy casualties, Zajączkowski ordered his men to organize a last pocket of resistance near the lineman's hut. After hand-to-hand combat with sabers and bayonets, the Polish resistance was broken. Out of 330 Polish soldiers who seized the train station earlier that day, 318 were dead. Several dozen wounded Poles were captured by the Red Army and are assumed murdered. Captain Zajączkowski himself committed suicide in order not to be captured by the enemy. Only twelve Polish soldiers returned to the Polish lines to recount what had happened during the battle.

== Aftermath ==
The battle was a disaster for the Polish forces defending Zadwórze. In effect, they were almost annihilated. However, the 11-hour-long fight halted the advance of the whole 6th Cavalry Division for almost 24 hours. This allowed for the strengthening of the defences of Lwów. In addition, because of the defense of Zadwórze, the 1st Cavalry Army of Semyon Budyonny could not reach the forces fighting in the Battle of Warsaw and attack the undefended right flank of the forces of Józef Piłsudski advancing towards the rear of the Red Army forces around Warsaw. When the forces of Budyonny finally regrouped and restarted their march northwards, it was already too late and the Battle of Warsaw ended with a complete defeat of the Red Army. The 1st Cavalry Army was later defeated in the Battle of Komarów, which became known as the "biggest cavalry battle since the 18th century."

== Remembrance ==
Because of the heroic defense and high casualties, the battle of Zadwórze was nicknamed the "Polish Battle of Thermopylae".

Among the Polish soldiers killed in the battle was 19-year-old Konstanty Zarugiewicz, a student of the 7th course of primary school and a veteran of the 1918 defence of Lwów, for which he was awarded with Virtuti Militari and Krzyż Walecznych. His body was never found. He was depicted on a 20-zlytoch coin released by Poland to commemorate the battle.

In 1925 when the authorities of Warsaw and the commanders of the Polish Army decided to build a Tomb of the Unknown Soldier in Warsaw, his mother Jadwiga Zarugiewiczowa was chosen as the person to select the coffin to be transported to Warsaw and buried in the grave.

== See also ==
- Battle of Wizna
- Tomb of the Unknown Soldier in Warsaw
- Polish-Bolshevik War

== Related reading ==
- Bitwa Lwowska 25 VII-18 X 1920. Dokumenty operacyjne; Rytm, Warsaw, ISBN 83-7399-012-7
