= Komarów-Wieś =

- Village
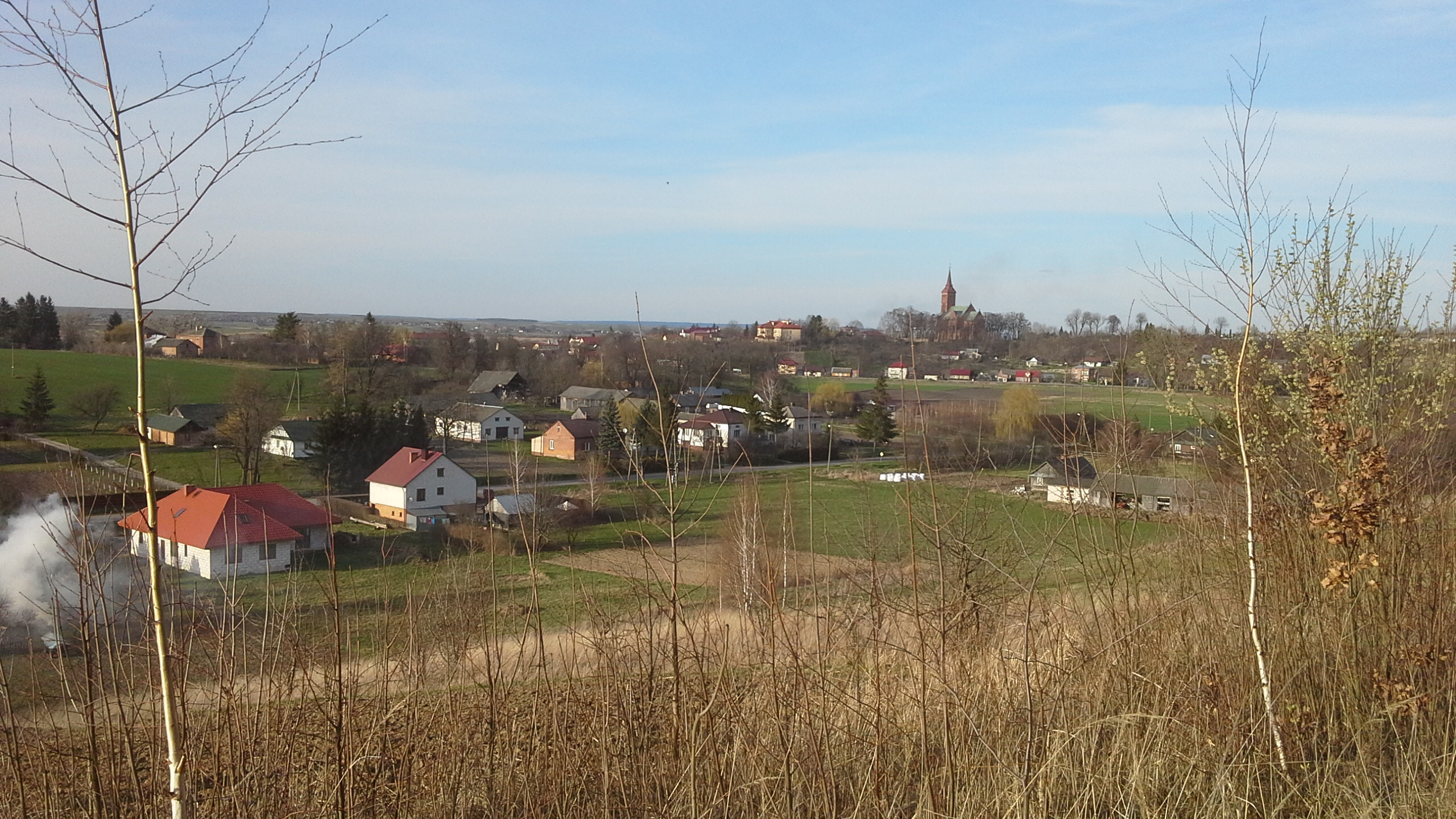
- Overlooking Komarów-Wieś

- Location within Poland
- Coordinates: 50°37′15″N 23°27′42″E
- Country: Poland
- Voivodeship: Lublin
- County: Zamość
- Gmina: Komarów-Osada

Komarów-Wieś [kɔˈmaruf ˈvjɛɕ] is a village located in the administrative of Gmina Komarów-Osada, within the district of Zamość County, Lublin Voivodeship, in eastern Poland.
