= Komarów Górny =

- Village
- Location within Poland
- Coordinates: 50°36′N 23°29′E
- Country: Poland
- Voivodeship: Lublin
- County: Zamość
- Gmina: Komarów-Osada
- Elevation: 285 m (935 ft)
- Population: 25

Komarów Górny [kɔˈmaruf ˈɡurnɨ] is a village in the administrative district of Gmina Komarów-Osada, within Zamość County, Lublin Voivodeship, in eastern Poland.
