= Janówka Wschodnia =

- Village
- Location within Poland
- Coordinates: 50°35′57″N 23°27′31″E
- Country: Poland
- Voivodeship: Lublin
- County: Zamość
- Gmina: Komarów-Osada

Janówka Wschodnia [jaˈnufka ˈfsxɔdɲa] is a village in the administrative district of Gmina Komarów-Osada, within Zamość County, Lublin Voivodeship, in eastern Poland.
