= Battle of Komarów =

1920 battle of the Polish–Soviet War

Coordinates: 50°37′59″N 23°29′00″E

- Part of Polish–Soviet War
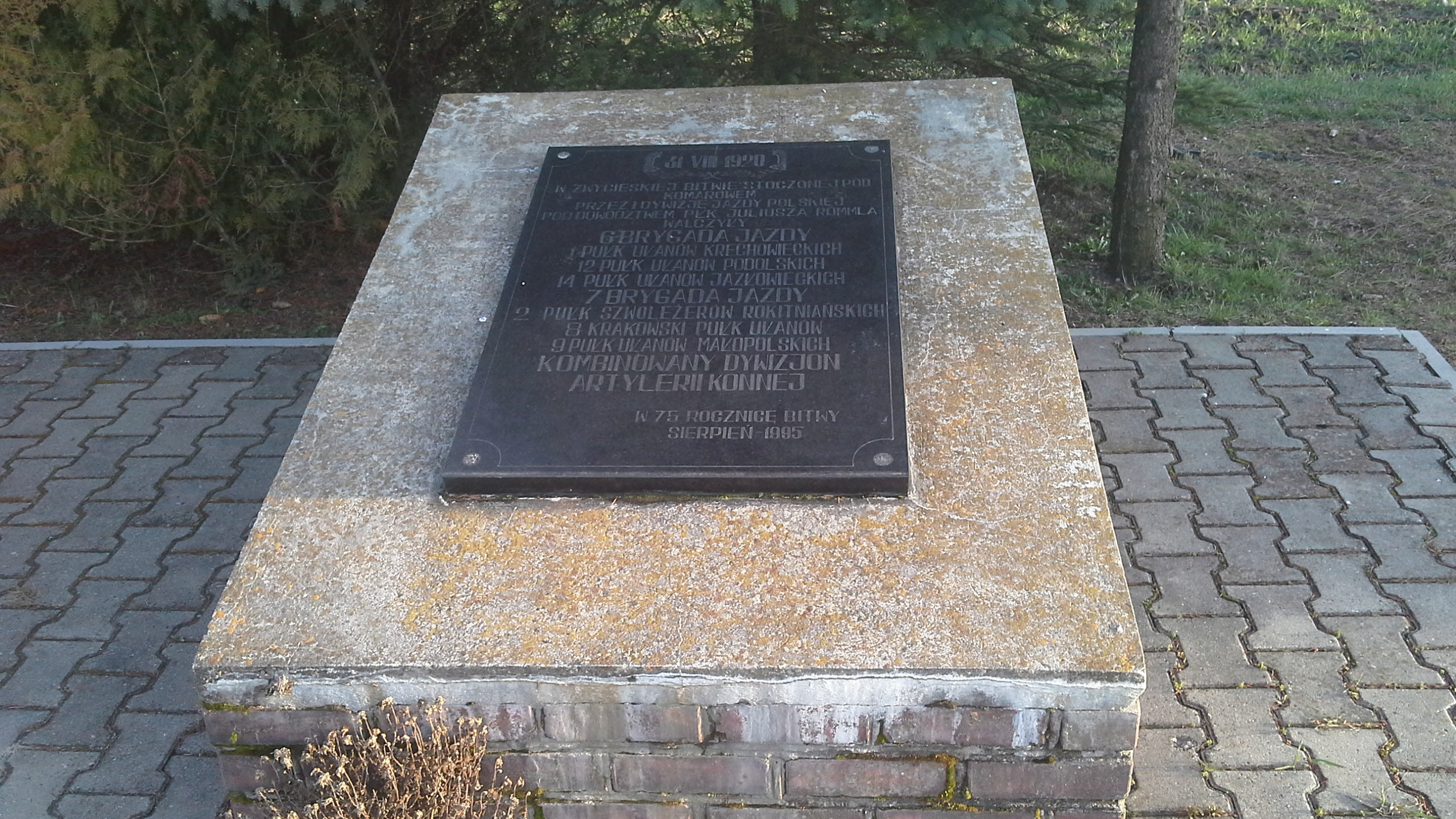
- A cemetery of Polish soldiers killed in the battle of Komarów, in the village of Wolica Śniatycka
Date	20 August to 2 September 1920
Location	Komarów and Wolica Śniatycka, near Zamość, Poland
Result	Polish victory

Belligerents
Poland	Russian SFSR

Commanders and leaders
Władysław Sikorski; Juliusz Rómmel; Stanisław Haller; Stanisław Maczek	(Russian Soviet Federative Socialist Republic) Semyon Budyonny

Strength
1,700 men, 6 regiments	17,500 men, 20 regiments

Casualties and losses
500 killed 700 horses	Estimated 4,000 killed

The Battle of Komarów, or the Battle of Zamość Ring, was one of the most important engagements of the Polish-Soviet War. It took place between 20 August and 2 September 1920, near the village of Komarowo (now Komarów) near Zamość. It was the last large battle in Europe in which cavalry was used as such and not as mounted infantry.

The battle ended in a disaster for the Soviet 1st Cavalry Army, which sustained heavy casualties and barely avoided being surrounded and destroyed. After the battle, the morale of the 1st Cavalry Army collapsed, and it no longer remained an effective fighting force.

== Eve of the battle ==
After the Battle of Zadwórze, the forces of the Bolshevik 1st Cavalry Army under Semyon Budyonny were halted for over a day. By this time the Russian cavalry units had lost much of their initiative and had not managed to reach or intervene in the Battle of Warsaw. After the Bolsheviks lost the struggle for the capital of Poland and started their retreat eastwards, the forces of Budyonny were ordered by Mikhail Tukhachevsky to march northwards to attack the right flank of Józef Piłsudski's advancing forces in order to draw Polish forces away from the north and relieve pressure on the routed Western Army. Tukhachevsky believed that if Polish forces were required to turn south, he could reverse the disaster unfolding in the north and resume his westward offensive to capture Warsaw.

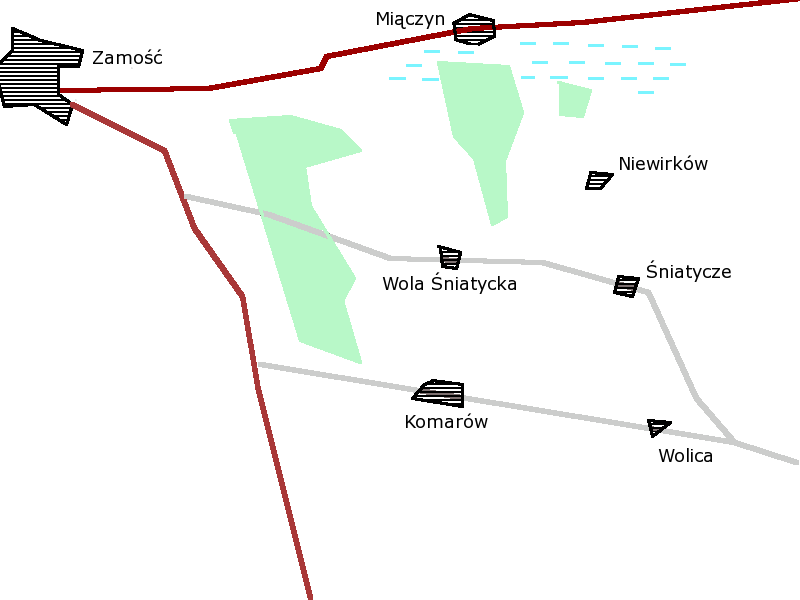
Area of the battlefield

However, heavy fighting in the area of Lwów and the upper Bug River postponed the march. By the time the 1st Cavalry Army reached the area of Zamość on 30 August 1920, the Polish forces had already managed to redirect much of their troops to the area and organize a line of defense.

== Initial clashes ==
On 29 August, the 1st Cavalry Army fought the first battle with units of the Polish 1st Cavalry Division. A small "Special Battalion" led by Major Stanisław Maczek fought a successful delaying action near the village of Waręż. Later that day, the Polish 1st Krechowce Uhlan Regiment chanced upon several unprepared Bolshevik units and took 150 POWs, three pieces of artillery and seven machine guns in the villages of Łykoszyn and Tyszowce.

The following day, the Soviet units continued their advance towards Zamość, but found the Polish mobile defence difficult to break. The garrison of the fortress was composed of a number of units commanded by Captain Mikołaj Bołtuć. Among them were the remnants of Ukrainian People's Republic Army 6th Infantry Division under Colonel Marko Bezruchko, one regiment and two battalions of Polish infantry, three armoured trains and a number of smaller units, some 700 bayonets and 150 sabres altogether. At the same time, the Polish 1st Cavalry Division moved to the villages of Wolica Brzozowa and Komarów, to the west of the city.

On his arrival in the Zamość area, Budyonny was left with three choices: he could assault the heavily defended city, try to break through the trenches of the 13th Infantry Division in the forests west of it, or try to attack the unknown number of Polish cavalry units some 20 kilometres (12 mi) to the west. Despite having little knowledge of the opposing forces, Budyonny did not expect significant opposition just yet and ordered his troops to bypass the city from the west.

== First phase ==
In the early morning of 31 August, a Soviet cavalry brigade crossed the belt of swamps to the north of the Polish positions. At the same time, the 11th Cavalry Division was engaged by Polish infantry in the village of Łubianki, while the 6th Cavalry Division was cut out overnight by Polish infantry to the west of Zamość.

At 6 o'clock in the morning, the 200 man 2nd Regiment of Grochow Uhlans was ordered to capture "Hill 255" to the north of the main lines of Polish cavalry. The hill was captured with no opposition. Soon afterwards, a large Soviet tabor was spotted, disorganised and mixed with a much larger unit of Soviet cavalry. The Polish forces charged, inflicting heavy casualties on the enemy rear units. Soon afterwards, the Poles were successfully counter-attacked by Soviet troops and forced to abandon the hill and retreat into the nearby village of Wolica Śniatycka. There the Russian advance was stopped by Polish heavy machine gun fire and at 10 o'clock the Polish 9th Regiment of Lesser Poland Uhlans under Major (later General) Stefan Dembiński charged the Russian positions and managed to recapture Hill 255. The Russians counterattacked several times, but to no effect.

Meanwhile, the village of Wolica Śniatycka, lost to the Soviet cavalry, was charged by the Polish 8th Uhlan Regiment of Duke Jozef Poniatowski. After a short fight, the disorganised Bolshevik forces were forced to retreat, leaving behind a large part of their heavy equipment and Budyonny's staff car. The commander himself evaded being captured. The 4th Cavalry Division was routed.

At 12 o'clock, the Polish 9th regiment started another charge down the hill on the Soviet 11th Cavalry Division that had replaced the withdrawing 4th Division. The assault was repelled, with heavy casualties on both sides. After approximately 30 minutes, the Soviet forces were forced to retreat; however, the Polish VII Cavalry Brigade was seriously depleted. Also, the 9th Regiment suffered serious casualties from friendly artillery fire.

The Polish VI Cavalry Brigade, until then kept as a reserve, started a pursuit down the hill. After a cavalry charge on the left flank of the withdrawing Bolshevik cavalry, the latter started a disorganised retreat towards Zamość. The pursuit was carried over by the 12th Podolian Uhlan Regiment under Captain (later General) Tadeusz Komorowski. During the retreat, the Poles inflicted heavy casualties on the enemy. After the pursuit ended, the fighting was halted until 5 p.m.

== Second phase ==
At approximately 5 p.m., the 8th Regiment near the village of Wolica Śniatycka was yet again assaulted by Soviet cavalry. To counter the threat, Colonel Rómmel ordered the whole VI Cavalry Brigade (1st, 12th and 14th Regiment of Jazlowiec Uhlans) to charge the enemy's flank. After a huge clash, the Russian forces in the area fell back northwards.

After a short rest, the whole Soviet 6th Cavalry Division, the strongest unit in the area, managed to finally break through a Polish infantry encirclement and arrived at the battlefield. The Polish VI Brigade was resting in and around the village of Niewirków, where it had withdrawn after the successful pursuit several hours earlier. The VII brigade started its march north-east to join the forces of VI Brigade near Niewirków. Halfway, it spotted a huge Russian line emerging from the forests around Wolica Śniatycka.

The Russian 6th Division (six regiments strong) formed a line, but had not yet initiated an assault. Juliusz Rómmel ordered all his available units to launch an all-out assault before the Russians started their attack. The 8th and 9th Regiments made a frontal charge, while the 1st Krechowce Uhlans Regiment was ordered to attack the left flank of the enemy. Soon it was joined by the remaining elements of the 12th Regiment from Niewirków, charging the enemy positions from the rear. After a 30-minute clash, Budyonny ordered his division to retreat.

The only available way led east, through the positions of the dug-in 2nd Legions Infantry Division under Colonel Michał Łyżwiński. The retreating Soviet forces managed to break through, but suffered heavy casualties. By the end of the day, the battle was over.

== Results and casualties ==
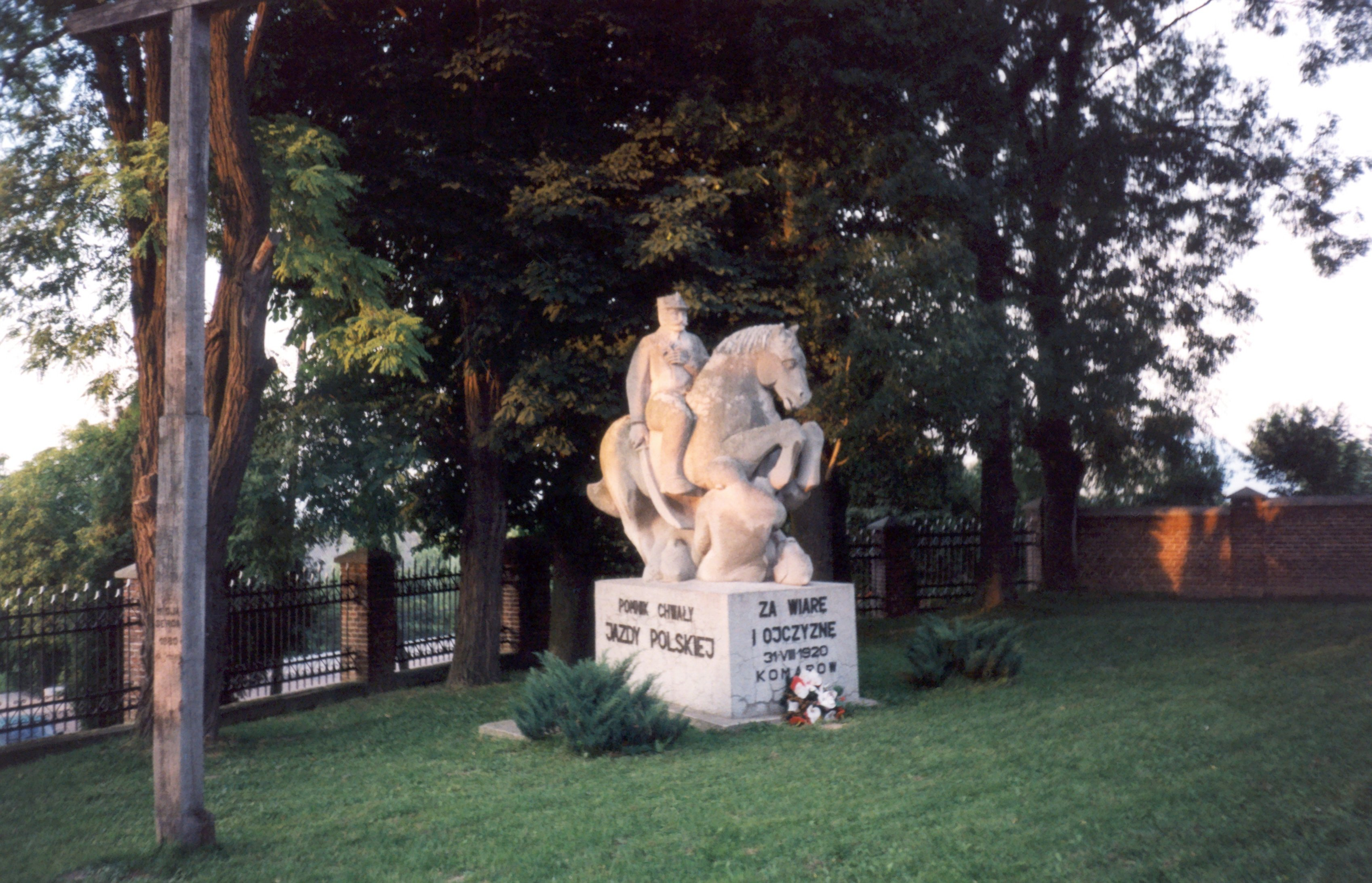
Polish monument to the battle in Komarów

The Polish 1st Cavalry Division then pursued the retreating Soviets. The forces of Budyonny managed to break through Polish lines, but the Poles did not leave them enough time to rest and reorganise. On 2 September the Polish VI Cavalry Brigade reached Łaszczów, where it successfully outflanked the Soviet 44th Rifle Division and annihilated one of its regiments (only 100 POWs survived the battle). The 1st Cavalry Army itself was not surrounded and managed to avoid complete destruction, but it no longer posed a threat to the advancing Poles. Unable to regroup, on 5 September 1920 it lost the town of Hrubieszów, and Włodzimierz Wołyński the following day.

On 12 September 1920, Polish forces withdrawn from the Battle of the Niemen under General Władysław Sikorski started a successful offensive on Soviet-held Volhynia. Pressed from all directions, the 1st Cavalry Army lost Równe on 18 September and was forced to retreat further eastwards. By the end of September, the Polish forces reached the Słucz River, near the lines held by the Soviets before their offensive towards Warsaw started. Soon afterwards, Budyonny's Army had to be withdrawn from the front, not to return until after the cease fire that October.

The Battle of Komarów was a disaster for the Russian 1st Cavalry Army. Numerically greatly superior, it failed to concentrate and act as an organised unit, which resulted in several consecutive waves of attacks, each of them repelled by the Polish forces. A lack of communication and disregard for intelligence reports resulted in heavy losses on the Russian side.

The Polish Army lost approximately 500 killed in action and 700 horses. No Poles were taken prisoner by the Red Army. The exact losses of the latter were never made public and are unknown, however, historians estimate the 1st Cavalry Army sustained up to 4,000 casualties, roughly 2/3rds of the unit’s strength during the campaign, elimination it as an offensive force.

Because of the numbers of forces involved, the Battle of Komarów is considered the greatest cavalry battle of the 20th century. It is sometimes referred to as "the greatest cavalry battle after 1813" or the "Miracle at Zamość”, however, the “greatest cavalry battle after 1813” remains an error that is constantly repeated. The Battle of Brandy Station, 1863 had more cavalry forces involved, for example.

== Opposing forces ==
Red Army
Western Front

1st Cavalry Army
Budyonny
4th Cavalry Division
6th Cavalry Division
11th Cavalry Division
14th Cavalry Division
44th Rifle Division
Special Brigade
16 700 sabres, 284 MGs, 48 guns, 5 armoured trains, 12 aircraft, armoured cars

Polish Army
Southern Front
Jędrzejowski
1st Cavalry Division, consisting of VI Cavalry Brigade (1st Krechowce Uhlan Regiment, 12th Podolian Uhlan Regiment, 14th Regiment of Jazlowiec Uhlans) and VII Cavalry Brigade (9th Regiment of Lesser Poland Uhlans, 8th Uhlan Regiment of Duke Jozef Poniatowski, 2nd Rokitno Chevau-léger Regiment)
Juliusz Rómmel
2nd Legions Infantry Division
Łyżwiński
10th Infantry Division
Lucjan Żeligowski
13th Infantry Division
Jan Romer
Garrison of Zamość Fortress
Mikołaj Bołtuć

== See also ==
- Cavalry
- Polish-Bolshevik War
- Polish cavalry
- Charge of Rokitna
- 1st Krechowce Uhlan Regiment
