= Janówka Zachodnia =

- Village
- Location within Poland
- Coordinates: 50°36′01″N 23°25′30″E
- Country: Poland
- Voivodeship: Lublin
- County: Zamość
- Gmina: Komarów-Osada

Janówka Zachodnia [jaˈnufka zaˈxɔdɲa] is a village in the administrative district of Gmina Komarów-Osada, within Zamość County, Lublin Voivodeship, in eastern Poland.
