= Swaryczów =

- Village
- Location within Poland
- Coordinates: 50°39′N 23°35′E
- Country: Poland
- Voivodeship: Lublin
- County: Zamość
- Gmina: Komarów-Osada

Swaryczów [sfaˈrɨt͡ʂuf] is a village in the administrative district of Gmina Komarów-Osada, within Zamość County, Lublin Voivodeship, in eastern Poland.
