= Żniatyn =

- Village
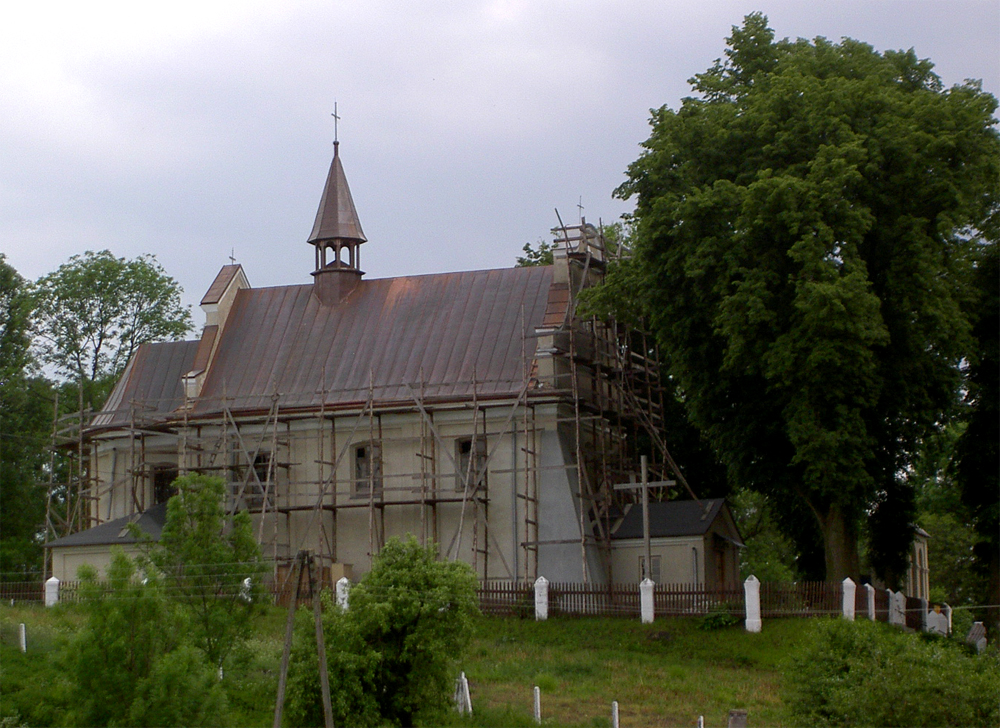

- Location within Poland
- Coordinates: 50°28′44″N 23°58′49″E
- Country: Poland
- Voivodeship: Lublin
- County: Hrubieszów
- Gmina: Dołhobyczów
- Population: 210

Żniatyn [ˈʐɲatɨn] is a village in the administrative district of Gmina Dołhobyczów, within Hrubieszów County, Lublin Voivodeship, in eastern Poland, close to the border with Ukraine.
