= Komarów-Osada =

- Village
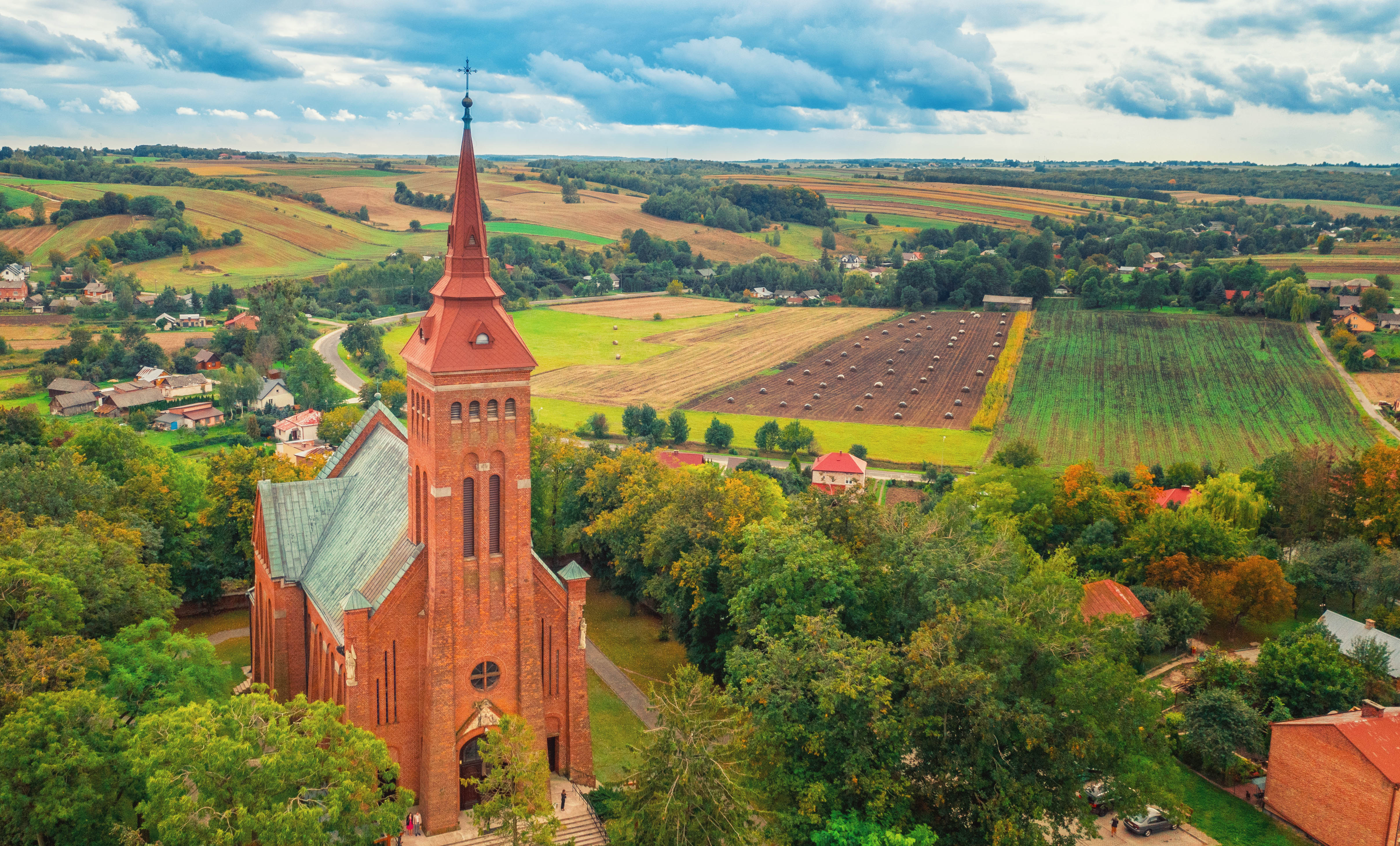
- Church of Holy Trinity

- Location within Poland
- Coordinates: 50°38′N 23°29′E
- Country: Poland
- Voivodeship: Lublin
- County: Zamość
- Gmina: Komarów-Osada

Komarów-Osada ([kɔˈmaruf ɔˈsada]) is a village in Zamość County, Lublin Voivodeship, in eastern Poland. It is the seat of the gmina (administrative district) called Gmina Komarów-Osada.

== History ==
On 31 August 1920 the village was the site of the Battle of Komarów, one of the most important battles of the Polish-Soviet War. It was the largest cavalry battle in the history of war since 1813, the last great battle of any significance in which cavalry was used as such and not as mounted infantry, and a decisive victory for the Poles.

Before the war there were about 1,752 Jewish inhabitants out of 2,895. In September 1941, there were 3,000 Jews in Komarow, among them those who were expelled from other towns. The Jews were subjected to forced labor: road construction, sawmill, Luftwaffe military base. In June 1942, the ghetto was established. On 5 October 1942, 50 young men and women were executed by a Gestapo unit. Between 15 and 31 October 1942, during the ghetto liquidation 2,500 Jews were executed. 5,000 Jews mainly from Zamość region were deported to Bełżec and Sobibor extermination camps.
