= Klimontów =

Klimontów may refer to the following places in Poland:

- Klimontów, Jędrzejów County in Świętokrzyskie Voivodeship (south-central Poland)
- Klimontów, Sandomierz County in Świętokrzyskie Voivodeship (south-central Poland)
- Klimontów, Lower Silesian Voivodeship (south-west Poland)
- Klimontów, Lesser Poland Voivodeship (south Poland)
- Klimontów, Sosnowiec, district of Sosnowiec, southern Poland
