= Księżostany =

- Village
- Location within Poland
- Coordinates: 50°37′N 23°24′E
- Country: Poland
- Voivodeship: Lublin
- County: Zamość
- Gmina: Komarów-Osada

Księżostany [kɕɛ̃ʐɔˈstanɨ] is a village in the administrative district of Gmina Komarów-Osada, within Zamość County, Lublin Voivodeship, in eastern Poland.
