= Wolica Śniatycka =

- Village
- Location within Poland
- Coordinates: 50°40′N 23°28′E
- Country: Poland
- Voivodeship: Lublin
- County: Zamość
- Gmina: Komarów-Osada

Wolica Śniatycka [vɔˈlit͡sa ɕɲaˈtɨt͡ska] is a village in the administrative district of Gmina Komarów-Osada, within Zamość County, Lublin Voivodeship, in eastern Poland.
