= Zadwórze =

- Village
- Interactive map of Zadwórze
- Location within Poland
- Coordinates: 49°22′40″N 22°38′38″E
- Country: Poland
- Voivodeship: Subcarpathian
- County: Bieszczady
- Gmina: Ustrzyki Dolne

Zadwórze [zadˈvuʐɛ] is a village in the administrative district of Gmina Ustrzyki Dolne, within Bieszczady County, Subcarpathian Voivodeship, in south-eastern Poland.
