= Battle of Zabłocie =

Part of World War 2

- Part of during the Polish–Ukrainian ethnic conflict in the World War II
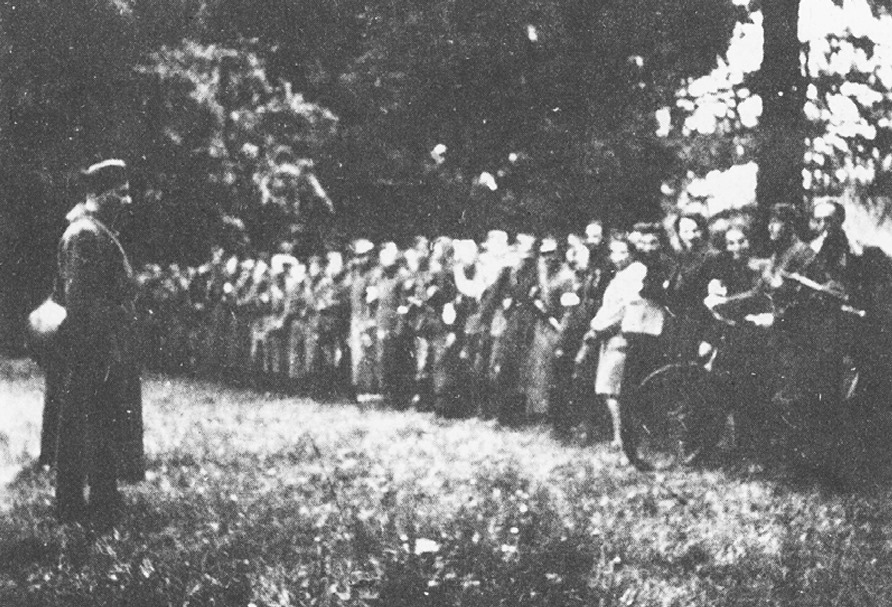
- The 348th Platoon “Kirgiz” of the Peasant Battalions
Date	14 February 1944
Location	Zabłocie, Hrubieszów County, Lublin Voivodeship
Result	Polish victory

Belligerents
Peasant Battalions; Home Army	Third Reich: Wehrmacht; German Gendarmerie; Ukrainian Auxiliary Police; SS Galizien; (Ukraine) USN

Commanders and leaders
Stanisław Basaj; Mieczysław Olszak	Unknown

Units involved
Battalion “Ryś” of the Peasant Battalions	Unknown

Strength
140 men	About 350 men

Casualties and losses
3 killed 5–7 wounded	27 killed Many wounded

The Battle of Zabłocie (Polish: Bitwa pod Zabłocami, Ukrainian: Бій під Заблоцями; 14 February 1944) was fought between the 348th Platoon “Kirgiz” and Battalion “Ryś” of the Peasant Battalions and Platoon “Hardy” of the Home Army under the command of Stanisław Basaj and Mieczysław Olszak against the Third Reich, Ukrainian Auxiliary Police, 14th Grenadier Division of the Waffen–SS “Galizien”, and the German Gendarmerie in the Hrubieszów County of the Lublin Voivodeship.

== Background ==
Prior to the battle, the Ryś Battalion, reinforced by a detachment of Volhynians under the command of Jan Ochman, aka. Kozak, planned to strike at the Ukrainian self defense and the Ukrainian Insurgent Army and Ukrainian police base in Sahryń. The Volhynians unit, well-armed, went over to the BCh side with its own equipment, including machine guns and grenades. However, plans for an attack were aborted when, on the morning of 14 February, German SS forces supported by Ukrainian auxiliary police launched an offensive in the Zabłoko area. The Germans, numbering around 270 troops and policemen, surrounded the village, forcing the partisans to defend themselves.

== Battle ==
=== Unsuccessful attack by Polish forces and Counterattack ===
The attack began with an onslaught of German columns from three directions: Hrubieszów, Łasków and Kryłów. In the village of Zabłocie the defence was carried out by the 4th platoon of Szczygiel (40 soldiers) and a team of Volhynians with a Maxim machine gun. However, at the initial stage of the fighting, the partisans did not have enough machine guns at their disposal, as most of the equipment was earmarked for the planned action in Sahryń. Under the pressure of the overwhelming German forces, the defenders were forced to withdraw to the Małkowski forest. There, there was a regrouping and concentration of Peasant Battalions and Home Army units, which gathered two operational machine guns by an Home army team from Prehoryłe. From the Małkowski forest, the partisans attempted a counter-attack, moving on Zabłocie with shouts of "Hurra". Initially, they managed to occupy an area of several hundred metres, but the open field and heavy German fire from behind the ruins and buildings meant that the assault failed. The partisans, pressed by machine fire, suffered casualties, making it impossible to continue the fight.

At a critical moment for the Polish forces, the commander Ryś organised a support group, which set out to help the less well-armed partisans defending Zabłocie. The Ryś unit, consisting of about 25 soldiers equipped with three hand machine-guns, reached the vicinity of the Górki colony, where fierce fighting was taking place.

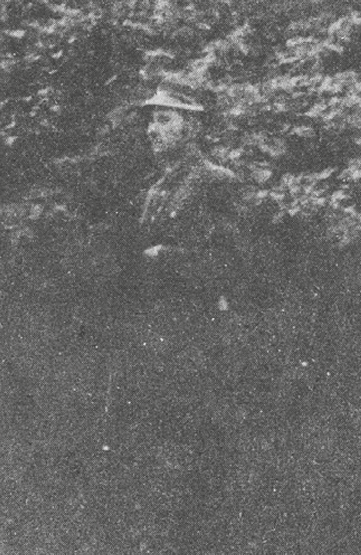
Stanisław Basaj „Ryś” before batte

The unit was divided into two groups. The first, larger one, was commanded by Kozak, who took up positions on the right flank, closer to the Mircze colony. The smaller group, headed by Ryś, moved to the left flank, with the intention of reaching the eastern part of the Górki colony. Positions were taken along the route to Kryłów, where the partisans deployed an erkaem to cover the movements of their forces. During the march, Ryś spotted two German soldiers setting fire to buildings in the colony. Both were shot. The group then took up positions in the buildings, where a machine gun was set up and prepared for battle. To the west of Ryś position, there were about 50 Germans were grouped who initially did not notice the Polish partisans. The partisans took them by surprise and attacked.

Although surprise initially gave the Polish partisans the advantage, the Germans quickly responded with massive machine-gun fire. The position of the German soldiers, although numerically stronger, was difficult - the right wing of the partisans, commanded by Kozak, was to close their retreat route towards Mircze. It is not clear whether Kozak's manoeuvre was successfully carried out.

=== Retreat of the Germans and Ukrainians ===
Under the pressure of the Polish partisans, the Germans began to retreat towards the Laskowski forest to their west. Despite their losses (’Kozak’ was wounded, and several partisans were killed or wounded), the Germans' defences were breached. The Germans split into two groups. One retreated towards Mircze and engaged in further fighting near Brzozowski's mill. They eventually started took up positions in a trench to the north.

== Aftermath ==
Once the fighting was over, several serious tactical errors and misunderstandings came to light which affected the outcome of the clash. Instead of carrying out the planned encircling move and blocking the Germans' path of retreat from the cauldrons, Hardy's platoon mistakenly attacked its own barrage group. As a result of this chaos, the third German group managed to get out of the western cauldron and escape north-east towards Rolikówka and Szychowice. Although it numbered more than 100 AK partisans and had one or two hand machine-guns, this group did not take an active part in the battle. Located in the Mircza forest to the west of the Mircza-Waręż road, it could have blocked the retreating German troops and destroyed their vehicles, which stood almost unprotected on the road. Instead, it passively watched events unfold. Only pressure from the hand machine-gunner Maszynista (Stefan Macybula) induced her to cross the highway once the fighting had stopped. Despite the partisans' initial advantage and success in several sections of the fighting, a lack of synchronisation between groups and erroneous command decisions, together with the fact that the above-mentioned unit of 100 AK members refused to join in the fighting, meant that the Germans managed to avoid total defeat. The battle of Zabłocie and Gorka demonstrated both the combat potential of the Polish resistance and the need for better command and coordination.

1st Battalion of the Peasant Battalions:

https://asaland.proboards.com/thread/577/1st-bch-battalion-hrubiesz-detachments

== Bibliography ==
- Motyka, Grzegorz (1999). Tak było w Bieszczadach (in Polish). Warsaw: Volumen. ISBN 8372330654.
- Jaroszyński, Wacław; Kłembukowski, Bolesław; Tokarczuk, Eugeniusz (2020). Łuny nad Huczwą i Bugiem (PDF) (in Polish). Światowy Związek Żołnierzy Armii Krajowej Okręg Zamość. ISBN 978-83-951832-2-5.
