= Stanisław Basaj =

Polish soldier (1917–1945)

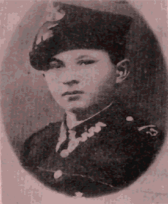
- Born: 24 November 1917; Polany, Lublin, Second Polish Republic
- Died: 25 March 1945 (aged 27); Kryłów, Lublin Voivodeship
- Military career
- Allegiance: Polish Armed Forces Peasant Battalions Milicja Obywatelska
- Service years: 1939-1945
- Nicknames: "Ryś", "Kraska"
- Unit: Ryś Battalion
- Conflicts: Invasion of Poland; World War II; Polish-Ukrainian ethnic conflict: Zamość uprising; Battle of Zabłocie; Battles of Prehoryłe; Battle of Mieniany; Hrubieszów Revolution; Sahryń massacre; Łasków and Szychowice massacres
- Awards: Virtuti Militari

Stanisław Basaj (ps. "Ryś", "Kraska"; 24 November 1917 – 25 March 1945) was a Polish soldier, partisan commander, and member of the underground resistance during World War II. He organized and led the largest detachment of the Peasants' Battalions in the Hrubieszów region known as the "Ryś" Battalion, fighting against Nazi forces and units of the Ukrainian Insurgent Army. However, on the 25th March, he was killed by a detachment of the UPA in Kryłów. He is considered as a national hero of Poland by Poles, especially those from the Lublin Voivodeship, but for Ukrainians is considered as a war criminal, in particular for the retaliatory actions that he committed against the Ukrainian population in the Lublin region during World War II.

== Biography ==
=== Early life ===
Stanisław Basaj was born on 24 November 1917 in Polany near Tokaruszczyzna in Tomaszów Lubelski County into a Polish peasant family. The family later moved to Małków. In his youth he was active in the rural youth organization Związek Młodzieży Wiejskiej „Wici”. He volunteered for the Polish Army but left service in 1937 due to his father's illness in order to help on the family farm. In late 1938 he married Genowefa Kołtoniuk. The couple had two daughters.

=== Military career (1939-1945) ===
At the outbreak of World War II, Basaj served as a corporal in the 2nd Regiment of Mounted Rifles from Hrubieszów. During the 1939 September Campaign he fought in the Battle of Mokra and took part in a night raid on Kamieńsk. After the campaign he did not surrender and from November 1939 to January 1940 commanded one of the first partisan units in the region, engaging in several clashes with Wehrmacht patrols. In early 1940 he joined the Union of Armed Struggle, the predecessor of the Home Army, and became involved in building the underground network in southern Hrubieszów County. He later transferred to the Peasants' Battalions, initially operating under the name "Chłopska Straż".

From spring 1942 Basaj organized and commanded a special combat detachment of the Peasants' Battalions. The unit carried out anti-requisition operations directed against German forced grain collections and provided armed protection to Polish civilians threatened by German gendarmerie, Grenzschutz units, and collaborating Ukrainian auxiliary police. Under his leadership the detachment expanded into the 1st Hrubieszów Battalion of the Peasants' Battalions, also known as the Ryś Battalion. At its peak in 1944 the battalion numbered between 670-800 soldiers, making it one of the largest and most combat-effective formations of the Peasants' Battalions in the Lublin region. It was organized on regular military lines with multiple platoons, a medical service, and its own non-commissioned officers' training school.

The battalion fought numerous engagements against German forces, including clashes at Kryłów, Mircze, Poturzyn, and Kosmów. The Germans placed a high bounty on Basaj's head. During the Zamość Uprising of 1942–1943 the unit played a significant role in defending Polish villages against German pacification and expulsion actions, notably in battles near Tuchanie on 15 January 1943 and Józefów on 20 January 1943, as well as in the areas of Modryń, Małków, and Prehoryłe. It also cooperated with local Home Army units.

As from the UPA attacks intensified in 1943–1944, Basaj's battalion increasingly engaged its forces and collaborating units (e.g. SS Galizien, Ukrainian Auxiliary Police) while continuing operations against the Germans. Key actions in this period included the defense of Małków in January–February 1944 and the Battle of Zabłocie on 14 February 1944.

After the entry of the Red Army into the region in July 1944, Basaj's battalion was disbanded. At the request of the Polish underground authorities he joined the Citizens' Militia to continue protecting the local Polish population from ongoing UPA attacks.

=== Death ===
On 25 March 1945, Palm Sunday, Basaj was ambushed and captured by a detachment of the UPA commanded by Marian Łukasiewicz in Kryłów. He was murdered shortly afterwards. His body was never recovered. The incident triggered further violence known locally as "Bloody Sunday", during which UPA forces killed additional 17 Polish Citizens' militiamen and 28 civilians in Kryłów.

== War crimes ==
On the night of October 21/22, 1943, in the village of Mircze, A unit of Peasant Battalions under the command of Basaj killed 26 Ukrainians and burned part of the village. On December 18, 1943, 18–22 Ukrainians died as a result of an attack by Stanisław Basaj's unit on Peresołowice. On December 24, 1943, 16 Ukrainians were killed in the village of Modryń, all of whom did not have time to escape from the Polish resistance fighters.

Basaj together with Stefan Kwaśniewski and Zenon Jachymek was one of the commanders of the "March 10th Offensive" even though he had previously opposed it. Action was aimed at Ukrainian nationalists, collaborators and ordinary civilians in retaliatory for UPA attacks on Polish resistance and civilians. On that day, over 150–1,240 Ukrainians were killed in the massacare in Sahryn, 186–330 in Łasków, 138 in Szychowice, 80 were killed, including 150 households burned in Turkowice, and over 120 soldiers of SS Galizien, 50 Ukrainian Auxiliary Policemen and 20 German Gendarmeries were killed.

== Bibliography ==
- Ziembikiewicz, Zbigniew „Smok”. W partyzantce u „Rysia”: Wspomnienia żołnierza I Batalionu Oddziałów Hrubieszowskich BCh. Warszawa: Ludowa Spółdzielnia Wydawnicza, 1982.
- Gmitruk, Janusz; Matusak, Piotr; Nowak, Jan (eds.). Kalendarium działalności bojowej Batalionów Chłopskich 1940–1945. Warszawa: Ludowa Spółdzielnia Wydawnicza, 1985.
- Zajączkowski, Mariusz. „Legenda w najlepszym wypadku…”. Kilka uwag na marginesie wojennych losów Stanisława Basaja „Rysia”. In: Pamięć i Sprawiedliwość, 2017.
- Teterycz, Martyna. Stanisław „Ryś” Basaj. Jego działalność powstańcza na terenie Lubelszczyzny. School research paper. Zamość: Katolicka Szkoła Podstawowa im. św. Ojca Pio, 2019.
- Jaroszyński, Wacław; Kłembukowski, Bolesław; Tokarczuk, Eugeniusz. Łuny nad Buczwą i Bugiem – Walki oddziałów AK i BCh w Obwodzie Hrubieszowskim w latach 1939–1944.
- Sulewski, Wojciech. Na partyzanckich ścieżkach BCh. Warszawa: Iskry, 1965.

== See also ==
- Peasant Battalions
- Hrubieszów Revolution
- Polish-Ukrainian ethnic conflict
- Zenon Jachymek
