= Ryś Battalion =

Polish partisan unit

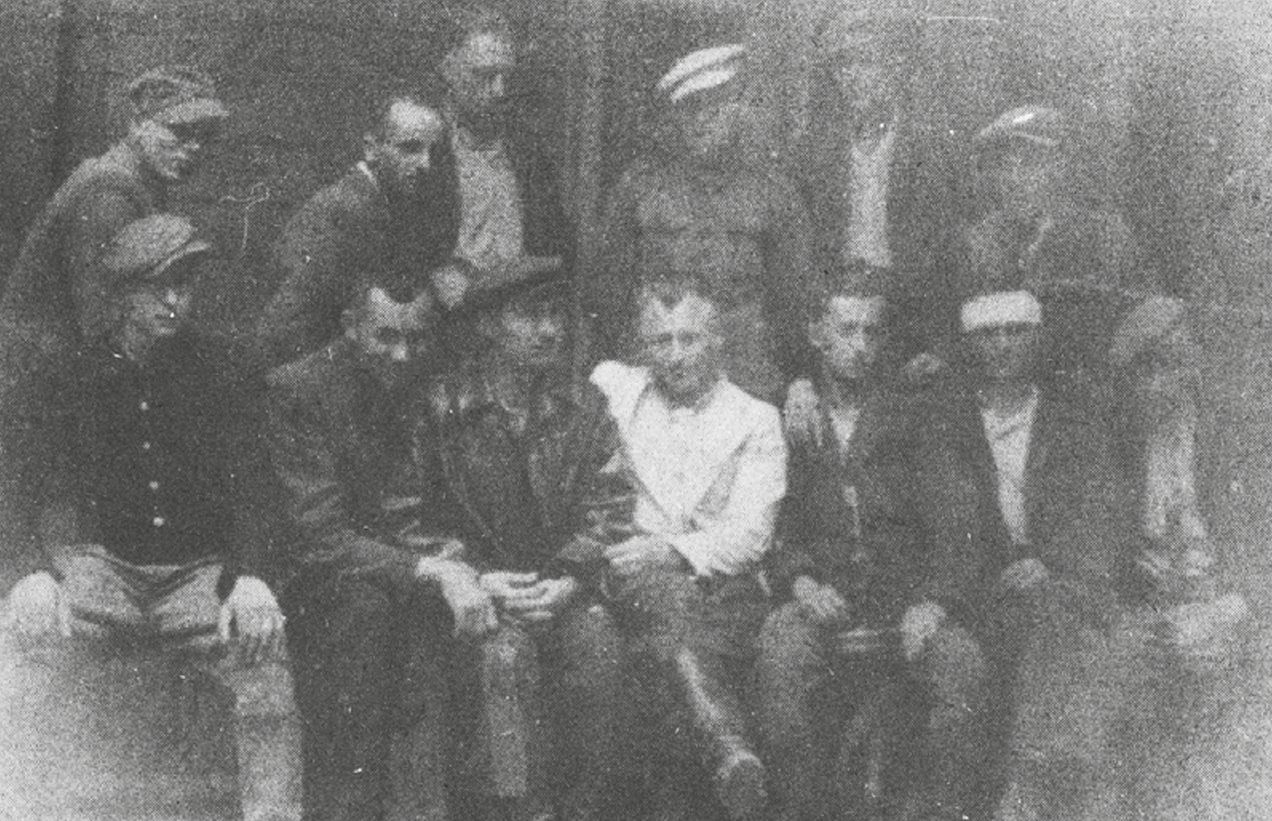
- BCh District Headquarters; Ryś is seated third from the left
- Active: Spring 1942–25 March 1945
- Country: Peasant Battalions
- Branch: Peasant Battalions
- Type: Partisant Unit
- Role: Wage Partisan war
- Size: 800 soldiers
- Garrison/HQ: unknown
- Nickname: Ryś
- Motto: "Przez Walkę do Zwycięstwa"

Commanders
- Ceremonial chief: Stanisław Basaj

Most detailed history of the battalion on the Internet: https://asaland.proboards.com/thread/577/1st-bch-battalion-hrubiesz-detachments

The Ryś Battalion, officially known as the 1st Battalion of the Bataliony Chłopskie (BCh), operated in the Hrubieszów District from 1942 to 1945. Commanded by Stanisław "Ryś" Basaj, it numbered several hundred men at its peak, and was one of the largest groups that fought against Ukrainian Nationalist troops and the Wehrmacht. They prevented the pacification and massacre of villages.

== History ==
=== Zamość Uprising ===
The battalion was under the command of Stanisław Basaj, who was known as "Rys". During the Polish Defensive War of 1939, Basaj had fought as part of the Wołynska Cavalry Brigade of the Polish Army.

The first partisan detachment created and led by Basaj existed from October 1939 until January 1940; it was active around the town of Hrubieszow, and during its short existence fought four minor clashes against the Germans. In January 1940, the small detachment (reportedly never having more than a few partisans) was disbanded.

A larger second partisan detachment was created and commanded by Basaj as part of the BCh during May 1942, and initially conducted only small-scale actions against the Germans and their collaborators. In the spring of 1942, a small operational group was formed in the village of Małków in the Hrubieszów district, headed by Basaj. During its early existence in 1942 the detachment likely had about 100 partisans. In the second half of 1942, there were four significant clashes from which the Ryś Battalion emerged victorious (at Kryłów, Mircze, Poturzyn and Kosmów). Moreover, he liquidated the commander of the Ukrainian Police of the town of Hrubieszów, together with several other policemen. In 1942, the Germans offered a considerable bounty for either the killing or capturing of Stanisław Basaj.

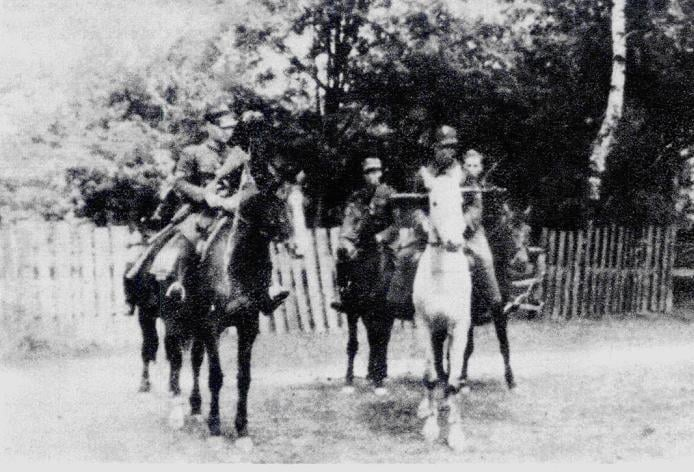
Ryś Battalion

=== Battalion in 1944 ===
In late autumn of 1943, two companies of the 14th Waffen-SS Grenadier Division attacked the villages of Górka-Zabłocie and Małków, where Stanisław Basaj's forces and the Home Army, who had been stationed there, easily dealt with the attack. The next day, the Ryś Battalion struck back, inflicting heavy losses and preventing the pacification of the Polish village of Małków. They then attacked another detachment of the 14th Division's Granadiers and police in the villages of Górna and Łasków, and, on the same day, defeated the Ukrainian militia in Małków.

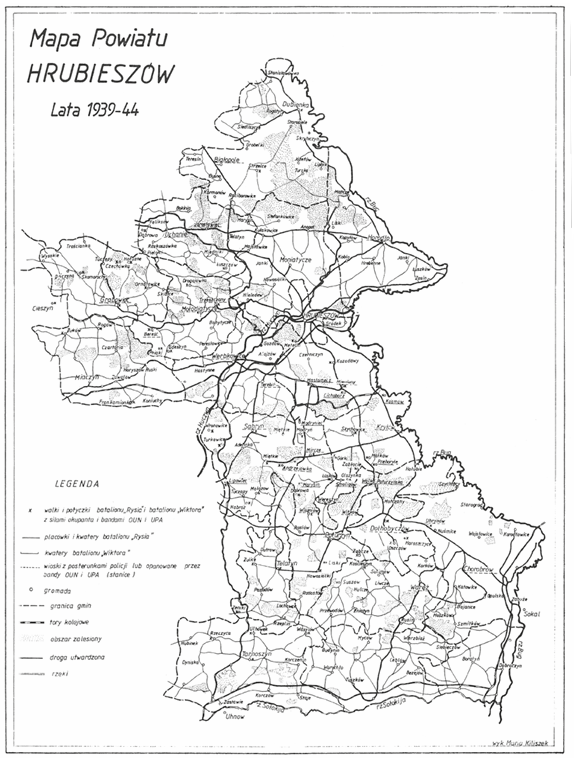
Map of Hrubieszów

On 28 February 1944, the battalion's commander, upon hearing that the village of Małków was being pacified by combined German-Ukrainian forces, immediately set off to help the village, together with the AK Partisan Detachment of "Czarus". After pushing out the enemy forces, the combined German-Ukrainian forces were attacked from 3 sides, and the German offensive ended in a defeat and the death of the commander. On the partisan side, 6 soldiers were killed and 16 were wounded.

On 29 February, three platoons of the 1st BCh Battalion (led by Stanisław Basaj), jointly with an AK platoon (commanded by "Huragan"), destroyed an outpost of Ukrainian nationalists in the village of Prehoryłe, killing several dozen Ukrainian nationalists and burning down the village. On 5 March, 4 platoons from the 1st BCh Battalion, 116 soldiers under the command of Basaj, and an AK platoon from the "Czarusia" company of 35 soldiers repulsed an attack by units of the 14th SS Grenadier Division and Ortschutz in Prehoryłe - Małków area. On 21 March, a small sub-unit of the 1st BCh Battalion ambushed a unit of the German Gendarmerie near Kolonia (Satellite Village) Marysin, in the process killing some of the gendarmes and forcing the rest to flee.

The activity of Ryś worried the German command, who decided to carry out a large-scale counter-partisan operation, commanded by Lt. Col. Werner Froemert, in the southern part of the Hrubieszów district. On 27 March, the Germans and their Ukrainian collaborators surrounded the Ryś Battalion. After a fierce battle, Ryś and part of his unit managed to break out of the encirclement, suffering heavy losses in the process—Majewski wrote that the Poles lost between 33 and 75 partisans, while Peasant Battalion memoirs claim that 27 Polish partisans were killed. After the battle, the Germans and their Ukrainian collaborators proceeded to pacify Smoligów. In fear of more German anti-partisan actions, Basaj decided to evacuate his unit to Tomaszów county.

In April, part of the 1st BCh Battalion fought a clash against a German armored train, suffering no casualties and tearing off a section of the railway tracks. On 11 May, the 1st BCh Battalion helped to derail a German train transporting ammunition near Krasnobród, killing around 15 German troops, capturing weapons and ammunition, and interrupting traffic on the railway line for three days. In 28 May–9 June, the 1st BCh Battalion fought alongside Soviet partisans against the collaborationist Kalmuck Cavalry Corps, establishing a partisan defensive line on the Tanew River. 120 Kalmuck and a few German troops were killed, while the Polish partisans had 10 killed and 20 wounded. On 18 July, a group of the battalion's partisans came to the aid of the ethnic Polish village of Stasin, which was being plundered by a group of German and Vlasovite troops; the Polish partisans killed some of them, with the rest fleeing.

Stanisław Basaj was killed on 25 March 1945 during a UPA attack on Kryłów. He had been detained and abused in Kryłów, where the perpetrators had also undressed and shot 17 MO officers tied up on the floor, and the Ukrainian nationalists had murdered 28 civilian residents.
