= Battles of Prehoryłe =

Series of skirmishes in Poland, 1943–1944

- Part of Polish–Ukrainian ethnic conflict
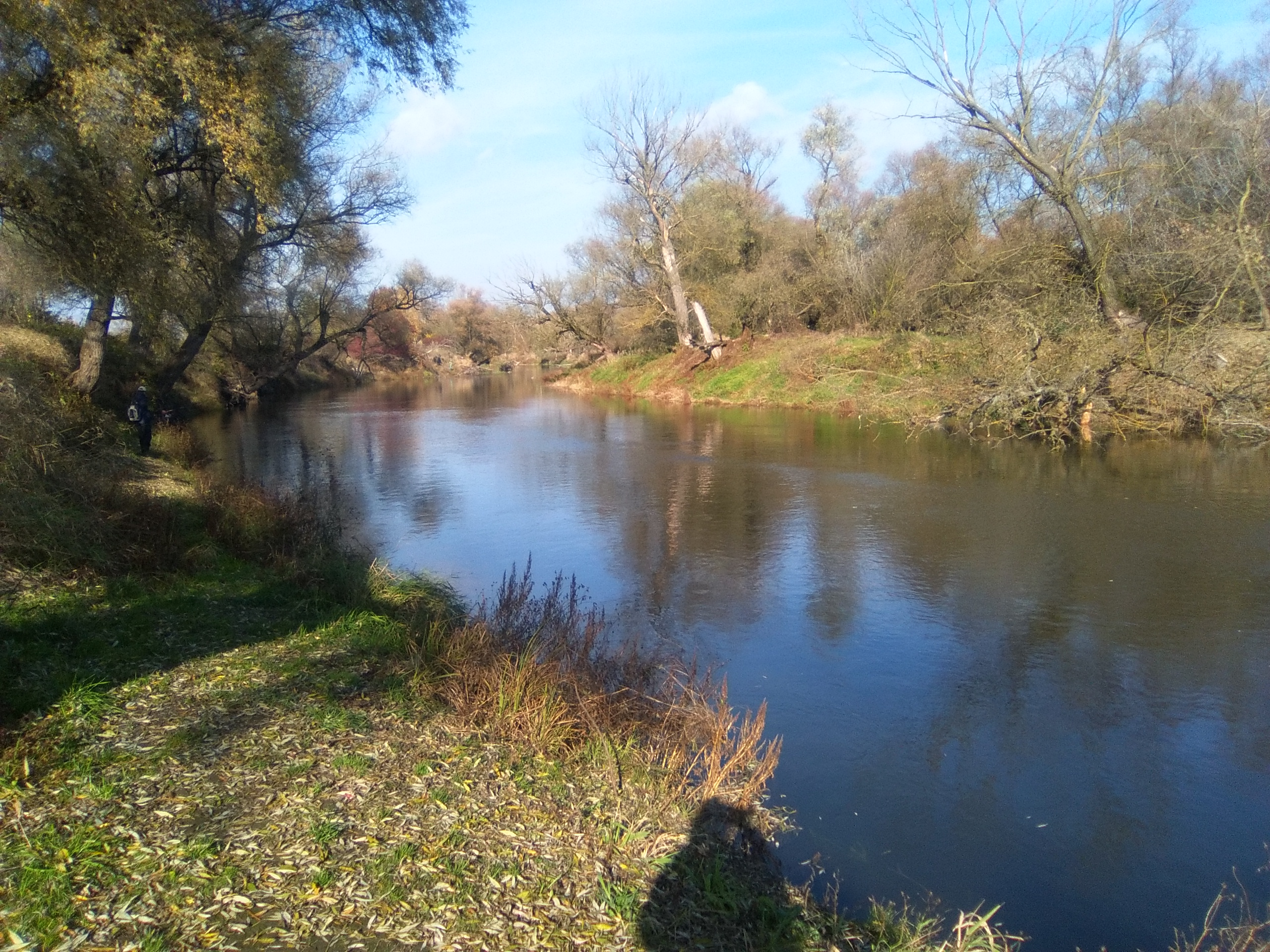
- Bug River
Date	April 1943 – March 1944
Location	Prehoryłe, Poland
Result	Polish victory

Belligerents
Ukrainian Insurgent Army; Germany: Ukrainian Auxiliary Police; SS Galizien; Ukrainian Legion of the Self–Defense	Peasant Battalions; Home Army

Commanders and leaders
Unknown or lack of a unified commander	Third Attack: Stefan Kwaśniewski; Zenon Jachymek; Fourth Attack: Feliks Dżygała; Stanisław Basaj; Feliks Zwolak

Battles of Prehoryłe fought between Polish Partisan forces and German-Ukrainian forces, skirmishes took place over months in the village of Prehoryłe

== Prelude ==
After the massacre of Polish civilians in 1943, there were growing fears of a repetition of the events in Volhynia. So Poles organised self-defences as in the villages located between the Bug River and the strip of villages Bereść. The conflict escalated after that .in villages located between the Bug River and the strip of villages: Uchanie, Bereść, Hostynne, Werbkowice, Wronowice, Miętkie, Telatyn, Chodywańce. In these villages, to increase the effectiveness of the UNS troops, bunkers were built and trenches dug. However, in January there were only isolated mutual assaults, with a few casualties on both sides. Also from Volhynia, a throng of Polish people who were fleeing the terror began to arrive.

The course of events was sharper in the Hrubieszów area, where, on the initiative of the commander of the Hrubieszów District of the AK under Antoni Rychel, pseud. "Anio³", Poles acted simultaneously against the Ukrainian intelligentsia and those Ukrainians who, after the attack of the USSR on Poland, sided with the Soviets. The latter were denounced to the Hrubieszów Gestapo. Against the first group, the tactic of attacks on pre-designated persons was used. By June 1943 alone, 150 people had been liquidated in this way. Polish units (a detachment of Battalion of Stanisław Basaj "Ryś" In view of the development of the situation, the Zamojski Inspectorate of the Home Army decided to evacuate the Polish civilian population to the districts of Bilgoraj, Zamojski, Chelm, Krasnostawski and the western part of Tomaszowski, to strengthen Polish self-defence in the remaining area and to launch a coordinated attack on the area occupied by the Ukrainians. At the beginning of March, the evacuation plan was launched, but was only partially carried out due to the reluctant attitude of the Polish population

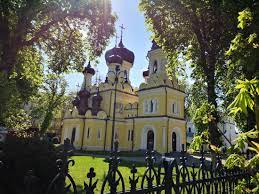
The Church at Prehoryłe

== Battles ==
=== First Battle ===
In April 1943, another defence of Malkov against the onslaught of Ukrainian nationalists. The battle in the village of Prehoryłe ended with the victory of the Polish self-defence, the Ukrainian nationalists did not manage to take the well-defended Holubia.

=== Second Battles ===
For the following months, the village was quiet, until the forces of the Home Army and the Peasant Battalions began fierce fighting with the local UPA forces. The Ukrainian forces, together with the Germans, then began attacking the ethnic Poles. Skirmishes were reported in Małków, where the forces of the Rysia Battalion under the command of Karol (Kaczała) defeated Ukrainian forces. This was not the end of the successes, the Battle of Zablocie was fought next, which brought Stanislaw Basaj fame. On 17 February the Germans directed their own and Ukrainian forces to Prehoryłe, but without success; fortunately, the forces of the Peasant Battalions arrived on time and gave an idea of why the Rysia battalion is considered not to have been defeated.

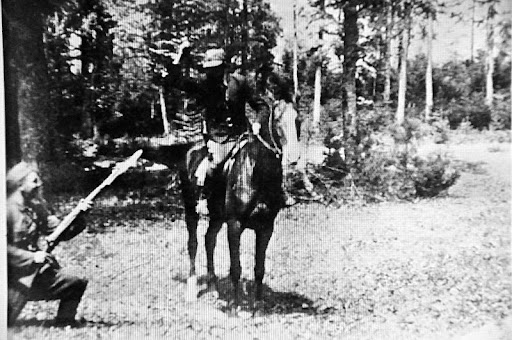
Ryś Battalion

On 29 February three platoons of the 1st BCh Battalion led by Stanislaw Basaj, jointly with an AK platoon (commanded by "Huragan"), in the village of Prehoryłe discovered an outpost of Ukrainian nationalists and smashed it; several dozen Ukrainians were killed from the UPA Company of "Bradiaha", while the Polish partisans had smaller losses, and the village was burnt down.

=== Fourth Battle ===
On March 8, 1944, Prehoryłe was attacked by a unit of the 5th SS Police Regiment, supported by local members of the Ukrainian Self-Defense Legion . The attackers were repelled by a unit of Peasant Battalions under the command of Stanisław Basaj "Ryś", who then set fire to the farms of the Ukrainians living in the village and massacred civilians

== Aftermath ==
This was followed by preparations for the Hrubieszow Revolution, these victories were of great significance as they discouraged the UPA forces from continuing to fight hard for every scrap of land.

1st Battalion of the Peasant Battalions:

https://asaland.proboards.com/thread/577/1st-bch-battalion-hrubiesz-detachments

== Bibliography ==
- Motyka, Grzegorz (1999). Tak było w Bieszczadach (in Polish). Warsaw: Volumen. ISBN 8372330654.
