= Hrubieszów Revolution =

1944 Polish-Ukrainian clashes during WWII

- Part of the Massacres of the Poles in the Volhynia and Galicia during the Polish–Ukrainian ethnic conflict and Zamość uprising in the World War II
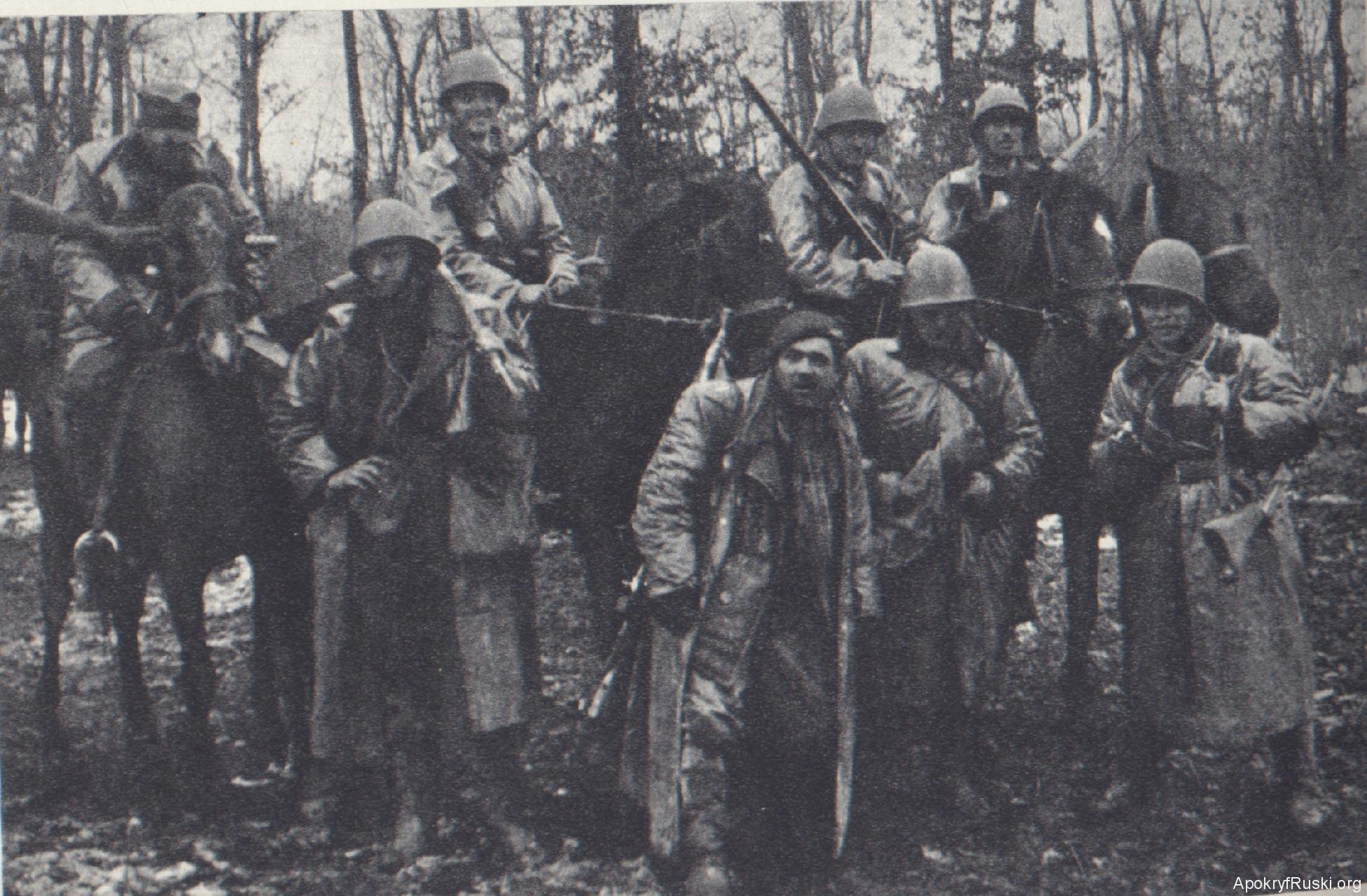
- Soldiers of the Home Army before the attack on the village of Sahryń
Date	March – April, 1944
Location	Hrubieszów and Tomaszów Counties, Lublin Voivodeship
Result	Inconclusive

Belligerents
Home Army; Peasant Battalions	Ukrainian Insurgent Army (Ukraine) Kusch Units of the Ukrainian Self–Defense; Third Reich: Ukrainian Legion of the Self–Defense; SS Galizien; Orpo; Sipo; Wehrmacht

Commanders and leaders
Zenon Jachymek; Stanisław Basaj; Stefan Kwaśniewski	Marian Łukasiewicz; Taras Onyshkevych †; Lieutenant-Colonel Werner Froemert; Local Orpo, Sipo, and Wehrmacht commanders.

Strength
3,150 men	3,600 men (not including the Germans)

Casualties and losses
Heavy	Heavy
- 1,969 Ukrainian civilians were killed 577 Polish civilians were killed

The Hrubieszów Revolution (Polish: Rewolucja hrubieszowska, Ukrainian: Грубешівська революція, romanized: Hrubeshivska revoliutsiia; March — April, 1944) was a series of armed clashes in Hrubieszów and Tomaszów Counties between the Home Army and Peasant Battalions, on one side, and the Ukrainian Insurgent Army, Ukrainian Self-defense Kushch Units, Ukrainian Legion of Self-Defense, and the 14th Grenadier Division of the Waffen–SS “Galicia”

In January and February 1944, the Ukrainian Insurgent Army (UPA) carried out anti–Polish attacks in Lublin Voivodeship, as it had, in 1943, in Volhynia and eastern Galicia. In response, in March and April 1944 the Home Army and Peasant Battalions carried out retaliatory actions against the Ukrainian armed units.

This in turn led to entry, into the area, of the Ukrainian Self-defense Kushch Units, Ukrainian Legion of Self-Defense, and 14th Grenadier Division of the Waffen–SS “Galicia”, resulting in intensification of anti–Polish actions and of the Polish–Ukrainian ethnic conflict.

== Background ==
In 1943, Polish partisans fearing that the Ukrainian Insurgent Army's terror would spread into the Lublin Voivodeship started attacking local Ukrainian activists, however these were not mass crimes, but executions carried out on designated individuals. In response Ukrainian police units started pacification of Polish villages and Polish partisans started pacification of Ukrainian villages turning into a vicious circle. The conflict in 1943 in the region lead to the execution of 456 Ukrainians, 286 of whom were, in Bozyk's words, 'nationally aware peasants'. The remaining group included Orthodox priests, Ukrainian national activists and officers of the Ukrainian Auxiliary Police.

At the beginning of 1944, fears began to grow on the Polish side that the events of Volhynia would be repeated in the Lublin region. The Ukrainians, on the other hand, intensified the creation of village self-defences in villages located between the Bug River and the strip of villages: Uchanie, Bereść, Hostynne, Werbkowice, Wronowice, Miętkie, Telatyn, Chodywańce. In these villages, in order to increase the effectiveness of the UNS units, bunkers were built and trenches dug However, in January there were only isolated mutual assaults, with several casualties on both sides.

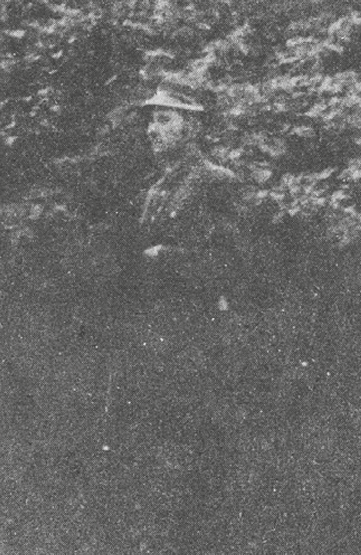
Basaj in February of 1944

The conflict escalated again the following month. Throughout the month, Ukrainian partisan units and police officers carried out attacks on Poles, with several people falling victim to each (villages of Medycze, Terebiniec, Pielaki, Turka). On 22 February, a group of Poles, whom Grzegorz Motyka considers criminals, killed six Ukrainians in Cichobórz and robbed two more. In response, the Ukrainians killed eight Poles two days later whom they suspected of having committed this crime. The course of events in Małków on 3, 8 or 13 February was unclear. According to Polish studies, the "Rysia" unit prevented a unit of the 14th SS Grenadier Division from pacifying this village; according to Ukrainian studies, it committed a crime against 14 civilian Ukrainians. Grzegorz Motyka claims that both theses may be true. However Polish attacks on detachments of the Ukrainian Auxiliary Police continued. On 28 February, AK units, after a fierce battle with Ukrainian self-defence, burnt down the villages of Liski and Kościaszyn. The losses of both sides are unknown.

In view of the development of the situation, the Zamość Inspectorate of the Home Army decided to evacuate the Polish civilian population to the districts of Bilgoraj, Zamojski, Chelm, Krasnostawski and the western part of Tomaszowski, to strengthen Polish self-defence in the remaining area and to launch a coordinated attack on the area occupied by the Ukrainians. At the beginning of March, the evacuation plan was launched, but was only partially carried out due to the reluctant attitude of the Polish population. The decision to carry out a mass action against Ukrainian villages in the Hrubieszów district was not unanimous. Opponents of the action feared its political consequences and a further aggravation of Polish-Ukrainian relations in the area. As the forces in the Hrubieszów district were too weak to carry out the operation, the commanders of the Tomaszów and Zamość districts were obliged to provide assistance to the Hrubieszów district troops. In the first days of March, a detailed plan of action was discussed in Steniatin. In the first place the Polish units were to attack Mieniany, Kryłów, Mircze, Dołhobyczów, Chorobrów, Krystynopol, Sahryń, Waręż, Bełz.

== Conflict ==
=== The 10th of March offensive ===
March 10th offensive
Date	March 10, 1944
Location	Hrubieszów County
Result	Polish victory

Belligerents
Home Army; Peasant Battalions	Ukrainian Insurgent Army; Ukrainian self-defense German Gendarmerie

Commanders and leaders
Zenon Jachymek; Stanisław Basaj; Stefan Kwaśniewski	Unknown

Casualties and losses
2 killed 3 wounded	190 killed in Łasków and Szychowice
- 700-1500 ukrainian civilians killed

==== Polish preparation ====
In the evening of 7 March 1944, in the forest Lipowiec near Tyszowce, a concentration of the Tomaszów AK troops took place, in the strength of about 1200 soldiers, under the command of Lieutenant Zenon Jachymek "Wiktor". A second grouping of about 800 soldiers was commanded by Lieutenant Eugeniusz Sioma "Lech". The next day there was an attack by the 5th SS Police Regiment, supported by local Ukrainian self-defence members, on the village of Prehoryłe. The attackers were repulsed by the 1st BCh Battalion, which then set fire to the farms of Ukrainians living in the village. The number of victims is not established, but most likely more were killed on the Polish side. The local AK, based on the obtained intelligence, anticipated another Ukrainian attack on 16 March. A pre-emptive attack on 9–10 March was planned by Hrubieszów District commander Marian Gołębiewski, despite the opposition of the Peasant Battalions. The Home Army planned to capture Sahryń, Uhrynow, Szychowice and Łaskow on the aforementioned days.

==== The attack on Sahryń ====
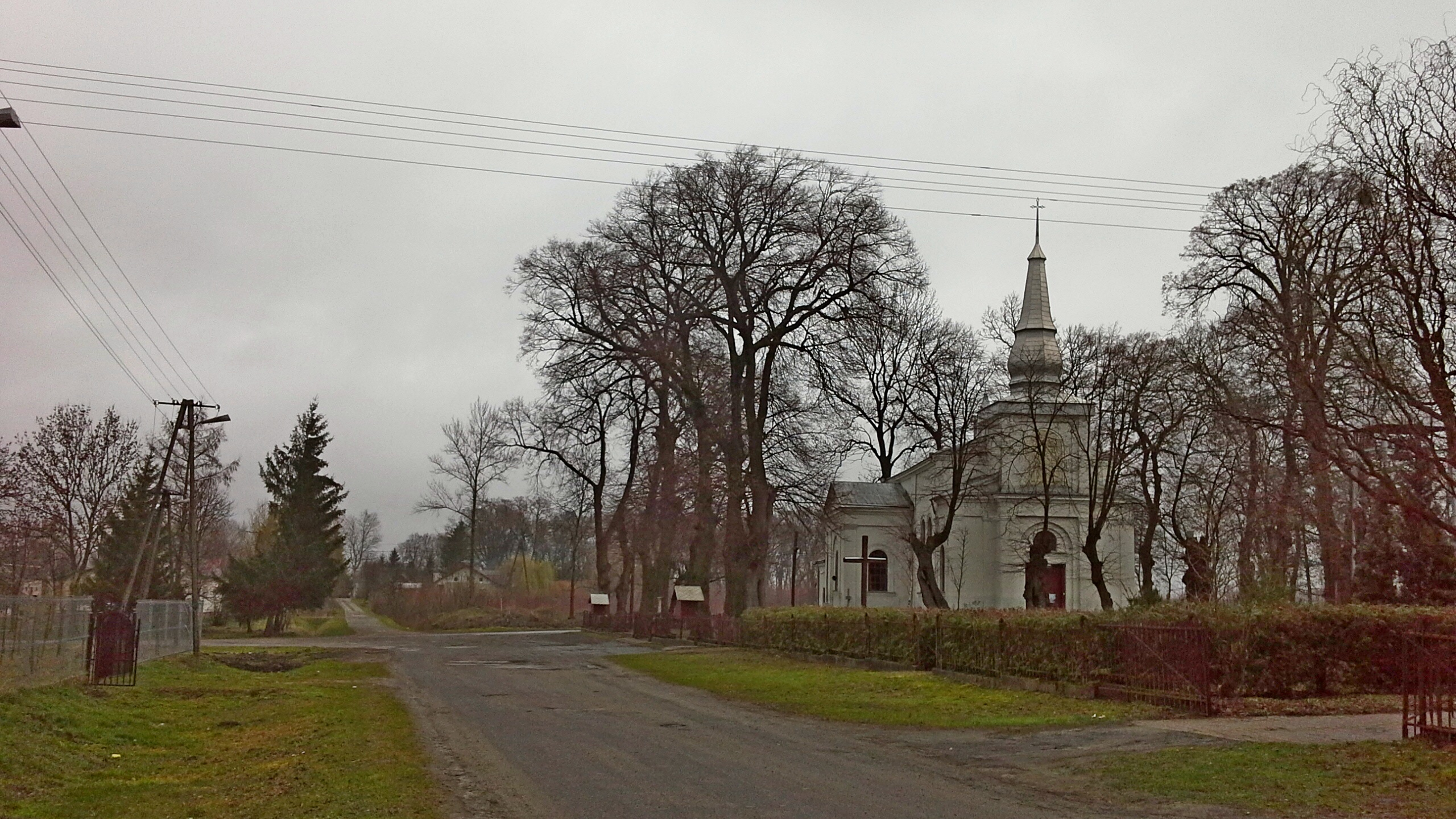
Sahryń was attacked by Polish partisans on March 10, 1944. The church visible on the right, then an Orthodox church, was burned down that day

Prior to the attack on Sahryń, Polish troops surrounded the village and isolated it from the neighbouring villages, which were dominated by Ukrainians, making it impossible for them to warn Sahryń's inhabitants. Polish soldiers shelled the village with tracer rounds, setting buildings on fire.

The attackers were resisted only by the station's staff, and there were exchanges of fire near the church, in the cemetery and by the station building itself. The resistance of the policemen was broken quite quickly. Whereas Ukrainian self-defence quickly fled the battlefield. According to some Ukrainian accounts, the police officers were outside the police station at the time of the attack. They may have been the ones who defended themselves in the church and cemetery. Afterwards, several of them retreated in the direction of Werbkowice. Armed Ukrainians, if not killed in combat, were shot on the spot.

After entering the village, the Poles also killed civilian Ukrainian residents. The Ukrainians they encountered were killed with gunshots, and grenades were also thrown into hiding places on farms. Usually the identity of the civilians was checked to avoid killing Poles, but there were also cases of residents being shot at without warning. The entire attack ended at around 2 p.m. According to data written down by a local priest, the attackers destroyed the Orthodox church, parish buildings and 280 houses. Zajączkowski writes that the village burned almost to the ground.

==== The attack on Łasków and Szychowice ====
After capturing Sahryń Stanisław Basaj's unit attacked Szychowice which was defended by a 200 man unit. as a result of the attack on Szychowice the village was captured, and the local Ukrainian population was killed.

Stefan Kwaśniewski says this about the attack on Szychowice:

Our attack so vigorously overran the village area that it was simply impossible to organise a practically effective defence.

After capturing Szychowice the Poles attacked Łasków. The attack resulted in the dispersal of the Ukrainian unit defending it and the killing of the local Ukrainian population. However, the Ukrainians from the 5th SS Police Regiment launched a counterattack which was repulsed by Polish forces.

==== Outcome of the offensive ====
The offensive was a massive success for Polish forces who captured the Ukrainian nationalist bases. The number of Ukrainians killed that day ranges from 700 to even 1,969 killed. Polish loses were only 2 killed and 3 wounded. In Łasków and Szychowice the Ukrainians and Germans lost a total of 120 SS-men, 20 German gendarmes, 50 Ukrainian policemen and many UPA and USN nationalists were wounded. Zajączkowki writes that in Łasków, both military and civilian casualties totaled to 300 killed.

=== Conflict at March ===
However, this was not the end of the Polish-Ukrainian fighting. On 16 March, the "Ciąga" unit, with the support of several squads from Uchanie and Trzeszczany, captured Bereść by deception, pretending to be Germans and thus taking over the Ukrainian guardhouse. Another 200-300 Ukrainians were killed in Bereść members of the self-defence and civilians.The AK and BCH units continued their offensive operations, albeit on a smaller scale, and so on 19 March the villages of Modryń, Modryniec, Masłomęcz, Mieniany, Cichobórz and Kosmów were attacked, destroying Ukrainian defences. According to Polish accounts, civilian Ukrainians had already fled the villages mentioned at the time of the attacks, but Grzegorz Motyka is of the opinion that at least a few victims fell. The same author claims that one and a half thousand Ukrainians were killed during the entire AK operation, although such high losses among the civilian population were not the intention of the command of the attacking units.

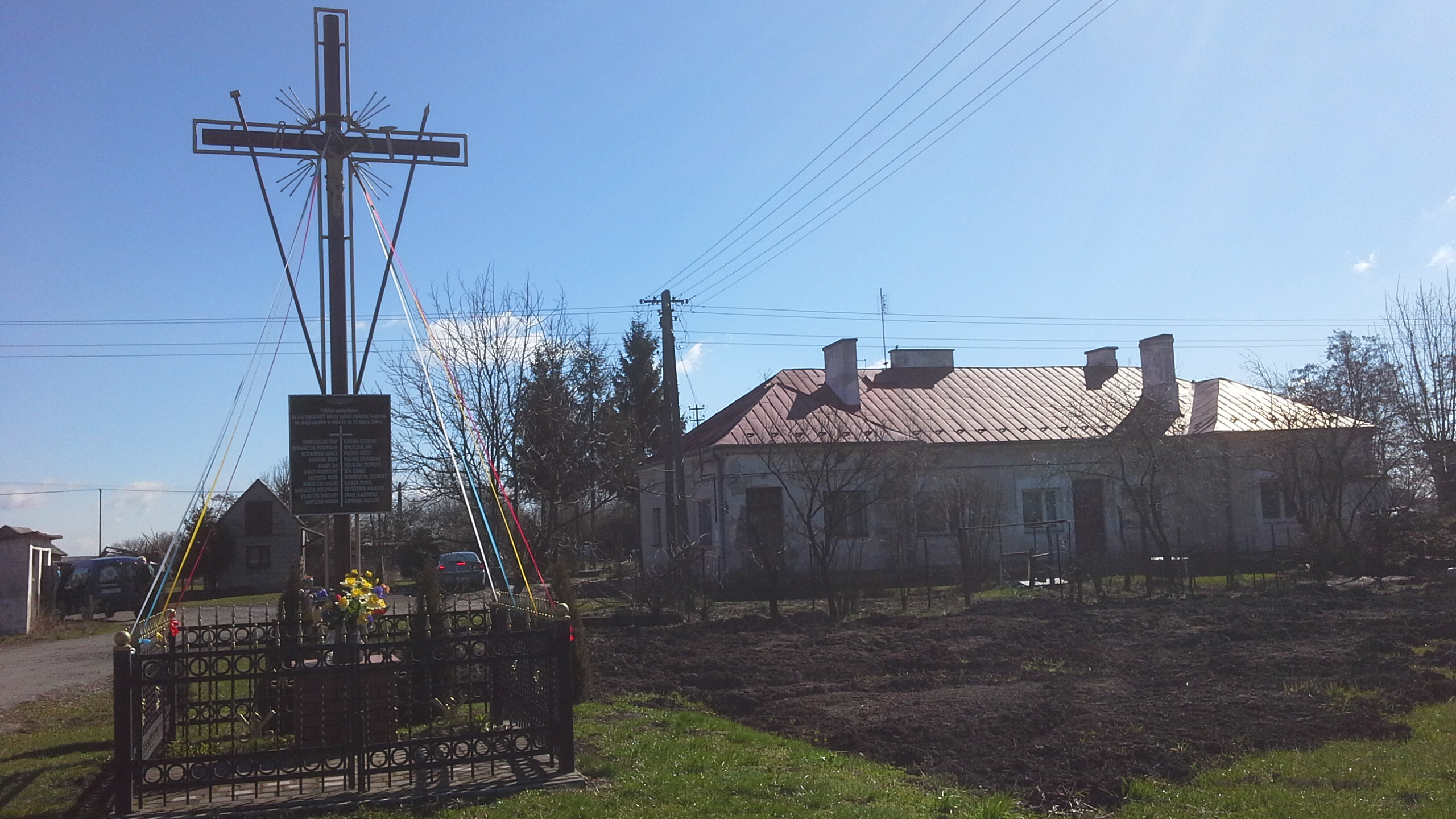
The former narrow-gauge railway station in Gozdów and a cross commemorating the Polish railway workers murdered there

A series of reprisal attacks immediately followed. On 9 March, unknown perpetrators (possibly Ukrainian policemen) shot three Poles in Grabowiec. Over the next three days, there were killings of Poles in the colonies of Kosmów and Romanów and in the villages of Masłomęcz, Rzeplin, Zaborce and Korczów, as well as on the road from Hrubieszów to Grabowiec. On 15 March, a UNS unit murdered 33 people at the narrow-gauge railway station in Gozdów. On 17 March, in Oszczów, as a result of Polish-Ukrainian fighting, 23 Polish villagers and a whole group of Ukrainians living there were killed. The village buildings were completely destroyed.

==== Ukrainian response ====
A major counter-offensive by the UPA army began on 16 March, when the "Halajda" regiment entered the Zamojszczyzna region from the south. It was located in the then communes of Tarnoszyn, Telatyn and Poturzyn. Kureń broke the resistance of the AK units (especially in Tarnoszyn), capturing Tarnoszyn, Dyniska, Ulhówek and Żabcze. In all localities there were crimes against Polish civilians. The UPA soldiers killed 84, 17, 14 and 30 people. On the 20 March a UNS unit attacked Poturzyn, killing 72 Poles and fending off a defending Hrubieszów company of the Home Army. Lieutenant Zenon Jachymek's unit arrived with relief too late and only managed to shoot those Ukrainians it found in the ruins of the village, engaged in looting. Wiktor's unit split into two groups of 150 men, which set off to Wasylów Mały and Radostów. The first village, where there was no self-defence, was taken by the Home Army without any fight. An unspecified number of Ukrainians with whom weapons were found were shot. However, as in Sahryń, "Wiktor" ordered that civilians be spared. The second group of the AK encountered resistance from Ukrainian self-defence in Kościaszyn, Suszów and Liski. According to some accounts, the capture of these villages was combined with the murder of 130 civilian Ukrainians. In addition, the Poles found 18 Polish families who had been hiding in shelters for a long time. On the other hand, atrocities against the Polish population took place in Frankamionka, which was attacked by a unit coming from Volhynia. Several dozen victims were killed; the remaining inhabitants of the village were saved by the arrival of the Home Army "Wiklina" company. On 25–27 March, UNS units destroyed Wasylów, Szczepiatyn and Hubinek, killing 102, 16 and 6 Poles. In response, the 8th company of the Telatyn AK under the command of "Szarfa" attacked Rzeplin, combining the elimination of Ukrainians considered particularly dangerous with the evacuation of Polish villagers. However, the surprise attack failed and a clash between the AK unit and the UNS took place on the spot.

=== Operations against Basaj's unit ===
On March 16–17, the "Ryś" unit fought a pacification group consisting of gendarmes, SS-men and Ukrainian Police from the UPA group "Jahody" (approx. 600 people strong), which attacked the village of Łasków, the colonies of Zabłocie and Małków; the unit was helped by the Home Army units of M. Olszak "Hardy" and A. Aleksandrov "Brawura"; the Ukrainians were defeated; 30 SS-men and UPA-men were killed in the fight, two cars were burned and the villages were saved. On March 19, units of the 14th SS Grenadier Division, Ortschutz, Ukrainian Police, together with German policemen from the Gendarmerie and Schupo (approximately 800 strong) began a large-scale operation against Basaj's battalion and the Home Army battalion under the command of Zenon Jachymek "Wiktor". when they surrounded one of Basaj's platoons in the village of Łasków, the main forces of the Basaj battalion and the "Wiktor" battalion rushed to help the surrounded people; "Ryś" drove out the enemy and captured the Mircze-Kryłów road; at the same time, the companies of "Czaruś" and "Wiktor" from the Home Army pushed the enemy away from the Sokal-Hrubieszów road and occupied Mircze. After achieving these goals, Polish partisans captured the last Ukrainian resistance points in the towns of Modryń, Modryniec and Masłomęcz; in the third phase of operations, Ukrainian self-defense bases in the villages of Mieniany, Kozodawy, Cichobórz and Kosmów were attacked, completely displacing their crews; significant losses were inflicted on the Ukrainians.

=== The Pacification of Smoligów ===
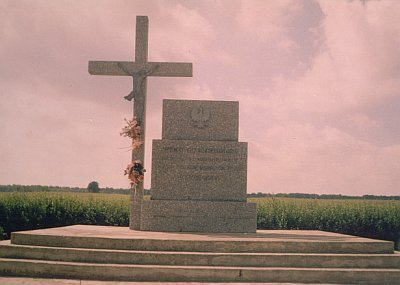
Monument to the massacre in Smoligów

The activity of ‘Rys’ worried the German command. As a consequence, a decision was made to carry out a large-scale counter-partisan operation in the southern part of the Hrubieszów district. The punitive expedition, which was commanded by Lt. Col. Werner Froemert, included: the Ukrainian Self-Defence Legion, sub-units of the 5th Galician SS Volunteer Regiment, a detachment of the German 154th Infantry Division, German policemen from the Ordnungspolizei, and a German Police Artillery Battery (the latter arrived all the way from the city of Lublin).

The operation began in the early morning of 27 March. The Germans and their Ukrainian collaborators surrounded the ‘Ryś’ battalion, as well as an AK outpost commanded by Mieczysław Olszak, pseud. ‘Hardy’. After a fierce battle, ‘Rys’ and part of his unit managed to break out of the encirclement, but the Polish partisans suffered heavy losses, Majewski writes that the Poles lost from 33 to 75 partisans killed, while Peasant Battalion memoirs claim that 27 Poles were killed.

The report of the Peasant Battalions of March 1944 writes this about the action in Smoligów:

The enemy was equipped with weapons. We, on the other hand, were very poor with ammunition. We defended ourselves to the last bullet, breaking out of the ring, we lost 27 soldiers, the losses were due to lack of ammunition. After the burial of the soldiers and the demolition of the Werbkowice-Uhnów railway, we withdrew with the unit to the area of the Tomaszów district in order to rest and to stock up on ammunition.

After the battle, the Germans and their Ukrainian collaborators proceeded to pacify Smoligów. The village was burnt down and its inhabitants were murdered regardless of age or gender. Entire families were killed. Many of the victims burned in the arson fire. Some witnesses also mentioned young children being thrown into wells.

=== The Conflict in April 1944 ===
On March 28, the entire fleet of "Hałajda" attacked the village of Ostrów. A fierce battle ensued. Some of the Polish forces gathered in a brick church and put up a desperate resistance there. The Ukrainians were forced to retreat. According to some reports, a dozen or so were killed in the burning village. according to others, about 300 people, probably only men. UNS had 16 dead, and "Hałajda" himself was mortally wounded. The numerical superiority of the Ukrainian forces made the AK decide to withdraw behind the Huczwa River. However, Jerzy Markiewicz argued that Ukrainian attacks alone would not have been able to force the Poles to make such a decision; the decision was determined by parallel attacks by the Ukrainian Insurgent Army and the UNS, as well as German anti-Partisan actions.

On 1 April, Polish troops and the remnants of the Polish population were finally driven out of Dolhobyczów. Soon, the evacuation of the Polish population from Telatin deep into the Tomaszów and Bilgoraj districts began. During the evacuation of the Polish population, a massacre took place in Poturzyn - in the early hours of the morning a unit of the 14th SS Grenadier Division, supported by a subunit of the Ukrainian Insurgent Army (UPA), invaded the village, where a large group of refugees were located; 162 civilians were killed.

The Poles found themselves on the defensive, fighting defensive battles. The whole operation was commanded by the commander of the Tomaszów district, Major Wilhelm Szczepankiewicz "Drugak", who was stationed with his staff in Kolonia Steniatyn. Breaking through the Polish defence between Żerniki and Podlodów would open the way for the Ukrainian Insurgent Army to penetrate the whole area of the Tomaszów district. Moreover, the Ukrainian forces were well organised under the command of the so-called "Chelm Front of the UPA" and armed by the Germans.

Between 2 and 9 April, Ukrainian Insurgent Army units, supported by SS-Galizien and Ordnungspolizei units, struck the eastern section of the Polish defence lines. The aim of the Ukrainian units was to capture the area of the municipalities of Jarczów, Tarnoszyn, Telatyn and partly Łaszczów and Tyszowce and to push the Home Army units behind the Huczwa River. The battle, fought on 5 April, ended with the success of the Polish troops, who maintained the occupied defence lines. The partisans lost only the village of Żerniki. In the course of the fighting, UNS units committed crimes against Polish civilians several times. 18 Poles were killed in Jarczów, Radków and Szlatyn, while 105 people of both nationalities fell at the hands of the UNS in Łubcze.

==== The Easter offensive of the UPA ====
The Easter offensive of the UPA and fighting for Posadów
Date	April 9, 1944
Location	Tomaszów County
Result	Inconclusive

Belligerents
Home Army; Peasant Battalions	Ukrainian Insurgent Army; Ukrainian self-defense (Nazi Germany) Luftwaffe

On 9 April 1944, on the first day of Easter, a new great battle took place along the entire length of the Polish defence line - from Telatyn to Jarczów. It was one of the fiercest and bloodiest battles fought during the occupation by AK and BCH units against UPA units in the Zamojszczyzna area. The main attack of the UPA units was directed at the Telatyn-Steniatyn-Posady-Rokitno section. The attack of the Ukrainians in this section was carried out with about 2,000 men, supported by heavy fire of mortars, grenade launchers and heavy machine guns.

Within a few days, a key battle took place, involving many Ukrainian units. The UNS-UPA "Bohdan" kurń received support from UPA sotnias from Volhynia, including the "Yurchenko" kurń. The plan of attack, drawn up with the participation of inspector "Wadym", envisaged an attack on 9 April, Catholic Easter, hoping to lower the alertness of the Poles. The Ukrainians intended to capture Posadów farmstead, Posadów forest, and drive the Polish population north-west. The "Yevshan" and "Korsak" sotnias, commanded by the chot "Holub", were to attack Posadów, while the "Brodiaha" unit secured the surrounding villages. The Ukrainians also planned to strike Telatyn and Kolonia Telatyn to draw back Polish forces. The attack began at 2 a.m. with the seizure of Rzeplin, where headquarters and a sanitary post had been placed. After taking up their starting positions, at 5:30am the Ukrainians attacked Telatyn and Posadów, surprising the Polish AK units. After about two hours of fighting, the Ukrainian forces united and continued their assault on Kolonia Steniatyn and the village of Steniatyn. The battle was particularly fierce in the Posadów forest and Posadów farmstead, which changed hands. At around 8am, a Polish counter-attack threatened the Ukrainian advance. The German reconnaissance aircraft that shelled the Polish positions and the inability to use reserves immediately forced the Ukrainians to retreat. It was not until around 1pm that "Wadym" gathered a retreat and reinforced the forces in Posadovo, which enabled an effective counter-attack and the halting of the Polish troops. The battle ended at around 4pm, when the Ukrainians withdrew from Posadowo with the captured property. Ukrainian losses were 4 dead and 13 wounded, while the Poles lost about 100 soldiers according to Ukrainian figures, although Polish sources give smaller num. According Ukrainians battle ended in Ukrainian success, although they retreated for fear of another Polish counter-attack. The Ukrainians destroyed Telatyn, Posadów, part of Steniatin and the farm and village of Lachowce. However, according to Mariusz Zajączkowski, only the Lutfwaffe contributed to this success, as perhaps due to the fact that Ukrainian soldiers often wore German uniforms, which they could have mistaken them for their own units, thinking that they were fighting Poles.

Those wounded in the battles near Steniatyne, Posadowne and Żulice were sent to field hospitals in Pukarzów and Wólka Pukarzowska. The Polish troops, despite heavy losses and the loss of the Telatyna area, held their main positions and did not allow themselves to be pushed out of the area. The "Jahoda" sotnia pushed the Poles out of the Rachaj forests, captured Telatyn, while the storming of Rokitno and Dutrow failed. About a thousand Poles and 2,000 Ukrainians took part in the clash. Grzegorz Motyka considers the entire battle inconclusive. Although the Ukrainian advance was eventually stopped, a breach was created in the AK defensive lines, which forced the Poles to retreat behind the Huczwa River. There was also a significant increase in the number of desertions in the Polish ranks. In view of the unfavourable situation of the Polish units, the commander of the Tomaszów district of the AK suggested mobilising all the forces of the inspectorate for a new operation against the Ukrainian Insurgent Army and the UNS. Despite the initial approval of this concept, the attack was eventually called off. However, the larger Ukrainian strikes also temporarily ceased, which Myroslav Onyszkiewicz explained by German counter-partisan actions that hit the UPA.

== Aftermath ==
In total, the Polish armed units burned at least 35 Ukrainian villages in the Hrubieszów County and approximately 1,969 Ukrainian civilians were murdered (including 769 women and 348 children). In the responsibility actions of the Ukrainian armed units was burned 25 Polish villages in the Tomaszów County and murdered approximately 577 Polish civilians. As a result of the Hrubieszów Revolution, it did not ended the Polish–Ukrainian ethnic conflict in the region and continued until the July of 1944, when the minor fightings was interrupted by the intervention of the Soviet Union.

== Sources ==
- В'ятрович В. За лаштунками "Волині-43. Невідома польсько-українська війна. — Харків : Клуб сімейного дозвілля; Центр дослідження визвольного руху, 2016. — 304 с.
- Hałagida I. Ukrainskie straty osobowe w dystrykcie lubelskim (pażdziernik 1939 — lipiec 1944) — wstępna analiza materiału statystycznego // Pameęć i sprawiedliwość. Pismo naukowe poświęncone historii najnowszej. — Warszawa, 2017. — No. 1 (29). — S. 381–384. (пол.)
- Hałagida, Igor (2017). "Ukraińskie straty osobowe w dystrykcie lubelskim (październik 1939−lipiec 1944) – wstępna analiza materiału statystycznego" [Ukrainian Casualties in Lublin District (October 1939− July 1944) – Preliminary Analysis of Statistical Material]. Pamięć I Sprawiedliwość. 29.
- Zajączkowski, Mariusz (2015). Ukraińskie podziemie na Lubelszczyźnie w okresie okupacji niemieckiej 1939-1944 [Ukrainian underground in the Lublin region during the German occupation 1939-1944] (in Polish).
- Zajączkowski, Mariusz (2021). "Konflikt polsko-ukraiński w dystrykcie lubelskim w optyce dokumentów niemieckich. Faza kulminacyjna (marzec - czerwiec 1944 r.)" [The Polish-Ukrainian Conflict in the Lublin Poviat from the Perspective of German Documents. Culmination Phase (March–June 1944)]. Pamięć I Sprawiedliwość. 38.
