= Sahryń massacre =

1944 massacre

- Part of Polish-Ukrainian ethnic conflict
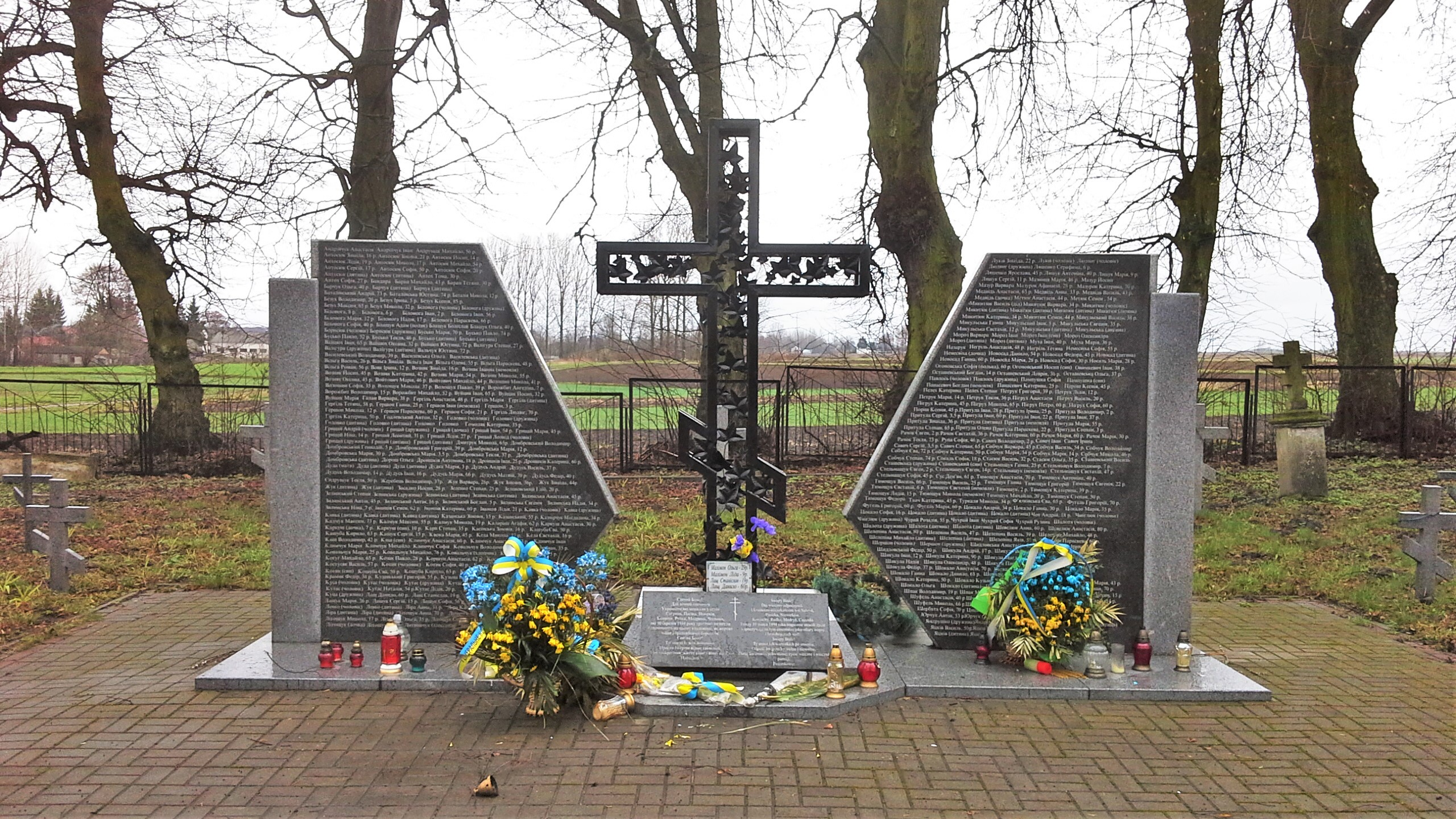
- Memorial to the massacre victims
- Native name: Різанина в Сагрині
- Location: Sahryń
- Date: 10 March 1944
- Target: Ukrainian collaborators and civilians
- Attack type: Mass murder
- Weapons: Firearms, bayonets, grenades
- Deaths: Anywhere from 150 to 1240
- Perpetrators: Home Army; Peasant Battalions
- Assailants: Stanisław Basaj "Ryś"; Zenon Jachymek "Wiktor"
- No. of participants: 800 partisans
- Motive: Revenge for massacres of Poles in Volhynia and Eastern Galicia, Anti-Ukrainian sentiment

The Sahryń massacre was a massacre of Ukrainian combatants and civilians by members of the Polish Home Army on 10 March 1944, committed as a reprisal to similar, though en masse, attacks carried out on Polish villagers by the Ukrainian Insurgent Army. The exact total death toll of Ukrainians killed in Sahryń is unknown, but estimates vary from 234 to over 600, of which between 150 and 300 were confirmed civilians. The surnames of 234 victims are known.

== History ==
In the spring of 1944, Sahryń was one of the Ukrainian villages, which was burned down by Polish partisans during the conflict of ethnic cleansing with Ukrainian OUN-UPA, along the Curzon Line. The conflict "continued throughout June 1944, resulting in considerable bloodshed and the destruction of dozens of Polish and Ukrainian villages". Sahryń was the site of the initial thrust of the AK counter-offensive against UPA, under the command of Lieutenant Zenon Jachymek, due to Ukrainian self-defence stationing there.

At dawn on 10 March 1944 the AK unit from Division Hrubieszow attacked the fortified village. A heavy fighting broke out. The Ukrainians retreated, but both Catholic and Orthodox churches in Sahryń were burned down. Between 150 and 300 civilians were killed by Polish forces in reprisal and 260 farmhouses were set on fire.

== Aftermath ==
Historian Mariusz Zajączkowski said that the massacre could be described as a war crime or perhaps a crime against humanity. The Institute of National Remembrance (IPN) investigation on this matter was discontinued in 2010, and the IPN denied that any crime had been committed against the Ukrainian civilians in Sahryń. A Ukrainian request to reopen the investigation was refused.

The monument in memory of the Ukrainian victims of AK in Sahryń was erected in 2009, with the hope that both Ukrainian and Polish presidents would attend the ceremonies, but there were spelling errors discovered in the names, and as of 2011, it still awaited its official unveiling. The monument was built by the Ukrainian side, with Polish participation.

In 2026 Ukrainian ambassador in Poland Vasyl Bodnar issued a request for Polish authorities to allow search and exhumation of victims in Sahryń and nearby Łasków.

== See also ==
- Massacres of Poles in Volhynia and Eastern Galicia
- Pawłokoma massacre
