= Battle of Mieniany =

Part of World War 2

- Part of during the Polish–Ukrainian ethnic conflict in the World War II
| Date | 15 September 1943 |
| Location | Mieniany, Hrubieszów County, Lublin Voivodeship |
| Result | Polish victory |

Belligerents
| Peasant Battalions; Home Army | Ukrainian Auxiliary Police |

Commanders and leaders
| Stanisław Basaj; Stefan Kwaśniewski | Unknown |

Units involved
| Battalion “Ryś” of the Peasant Battalions; ~10 partisans from Company “Pogoń” of the Home Army; ~10 partisans from Company “Grażyna” of the Home Army | Unknown |

Strength
| Unknown | Unknown |

Casualties and losses
| 1 killed 1 wounded | 4–8 killed |

The Battle of Mieniany (Polish: Bitwa pod Mienianami, Ukrainian: Бій під Мінянами; 15 August 1943) was fought between the Battalion “Ryś” of the Peasant Battalions and 20 AK partisans from Companies “Pogoń” and “Grażyna” of the Home Army under the command of Stanisław Basaj and Stefan Kwaśniewski against the Ukrainian Auxiliary Police in the Hrubieszów County of the Lublin Voivodeship.

== Battle ==
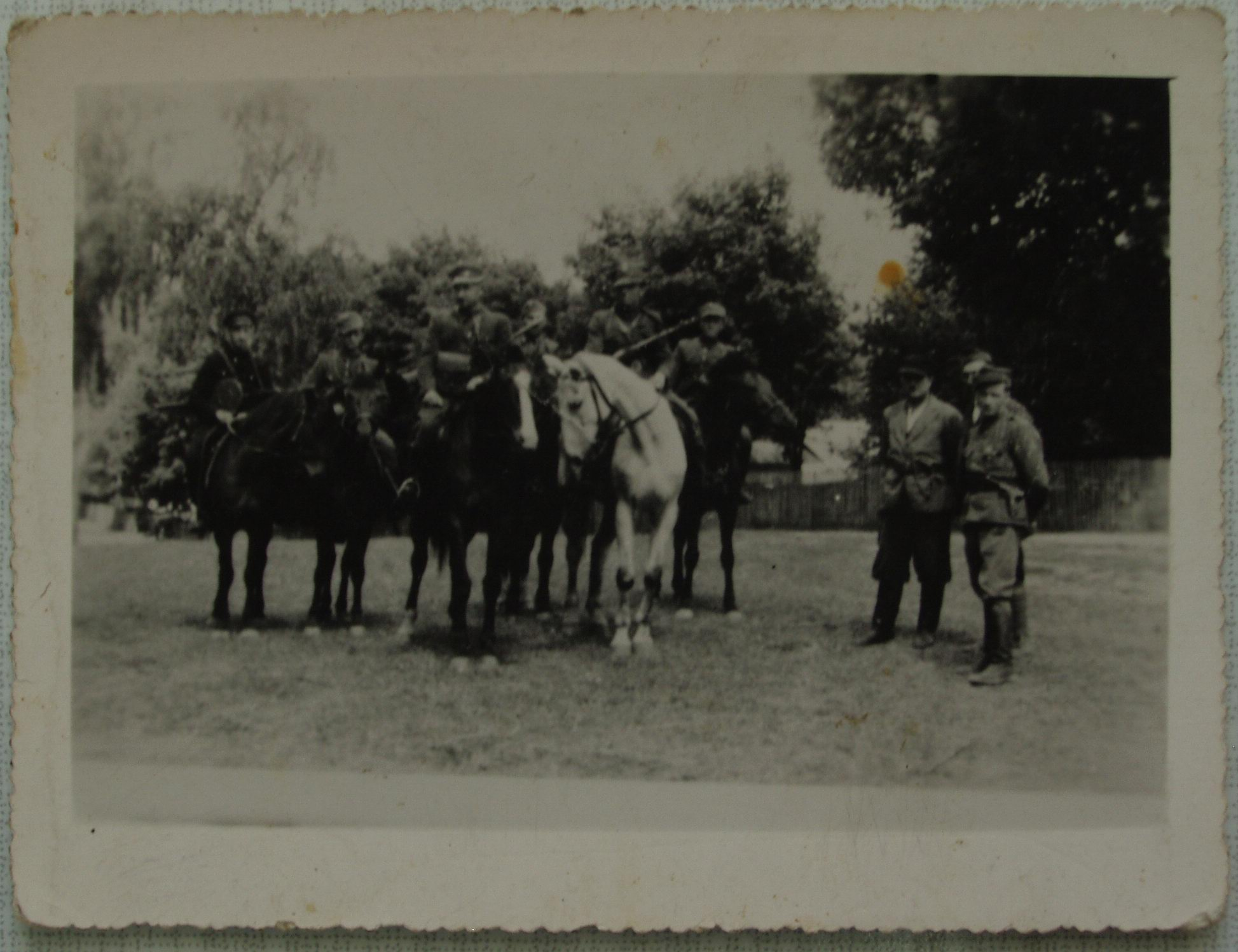
Basaj's Unit

== Aftermath ==
When the action was over, the unit withdrew to the designated assembly point by the chapel. However, during the march, there was another exchange of fire - this time from the Pogonia unit, the covering unit for this action, which mistakenly opened fire in the direction of the partisans. After the situation was clarified and the firing ceased, the troops safely reached the chapel.

1st Battalion of the Peasant Battalions:

https://asaland.proboards.com/thread/577/1st-bch-battalion-hrubiesz-detachments

== Bibliography ==
- Jaroszyński, Wacław; Kłembukowski, Bolesław; Tokarczuk, Eugeniusz (2020). Łuny nad Huczwą i Bugiem (PDF) (in Polish). Światowy Związek Żołnierzy Armii Krajowej Okręg Zamość. ISBN 978-83-951832-2-5.
