= Bohdan Koziy =

Ukrainian Nazi collaborator

- Богдан Козій
- Born: February 23, 1923; Pukasivtsi, Second Polish Republic (now Ukraine)
- Died: November 30, 2003 (aged 80); San José, Costa Rica
- Occupation: Suspected war criminal

Bohdan Koziy (Note: Ukrainian: Богдан Козій, romanized: Bohdan Koziy) (February 23, 1923 – November 30, 2003) was a suspected war criminal and allegedly a member of the Ukrainische Hilfspolizei (Ukrainian Auxiliary Police), a Nazi German mobile police force that operated in the General Government on July 27, 1941. The name of the unit reflected its geographic jurisdiction.

== Wartime activities ==
Koziy was born in the town of Pukasivtsi, then in eastern Poland (now in Ukraine). Between 1939 and 1944, Koziy was alleged to be a member of the Ukrainian Auxiliary Police. He was allegedly involved in the displacing of Jews into ghettos. He allegedly shot Bernard Kandler, who had tried to escape from a truck that was taking him to a ghetto; Lusi Rosiner, a fourteen-year-old hiding in a barn, and the four-year-old Monica Singer.

In 1944, fleeing the Soviet advance, Koziy and his family moved to Heide, Germany, where he worked as a farm hand. After Nazi Germany's surrender in 1945, the Koziys lived in a variety of displaced persons camps.

== In the United States ==
After the Displaced Persons Commission interviewed Koziy, he was granted permission to enter the United States on 17 December 1949, under the Displaced Persons Act of 1948. On 25 April 1955, Koziy filed his application to file a petition for naturalization. On 25 July 1955, he filed a petition for naturalization and on 9 February 1956, Bohdan Koziy became an American citizen.

On 20 November 1979, the United States requested the cancellation of Koziy's certificate of naturalization on the grounds that Koziy had illegally procured his citizenship by concealment of a material fact or by willful misrepresentation by failing to disclose his involvement in the occupational police in Ukraine. Koziy denied involvement in the Ukrainian Auxiliary Police and contended his actions were insufficient to support revocation of his citizenship. However, his citizenship was revoked on the basis of testimonies of Polish witnesses in a court hearing on 29 March 1982.

== Subsequent investigation ==
Koziy moved to Costa Rica in 1985. On 23 September 2002, the Branch Commission for the Prosecution of Crimes against the Polish Nation in Katowice initiated an investigation into the case of a Nazi crime committed in Łysiec in the Stanisławów Voivodeship. Bohdan Koziy was accused of the murder of three Jews: Bernard Kandler, Lusi Rosiner and Monica Singer.

On 21 November 2003, the Polish authorities turned to the government of Costa Rica demanding Koziy's arrest and extradition. The Costa Rican court granted the deportation order but Koziy died soon after on 30 November 2003, while in hospital in San José, from a stroke.

== See also ==
- John Demjanjuk
- Ukrainian Auxiliary Police

== Sources ==
- USA vs Bohdan Koziy
- Investigation Conducted by the Polish Institute of National Remembrance
- Koziy dies before trial (in Polish)
