= Modryń =

- Village
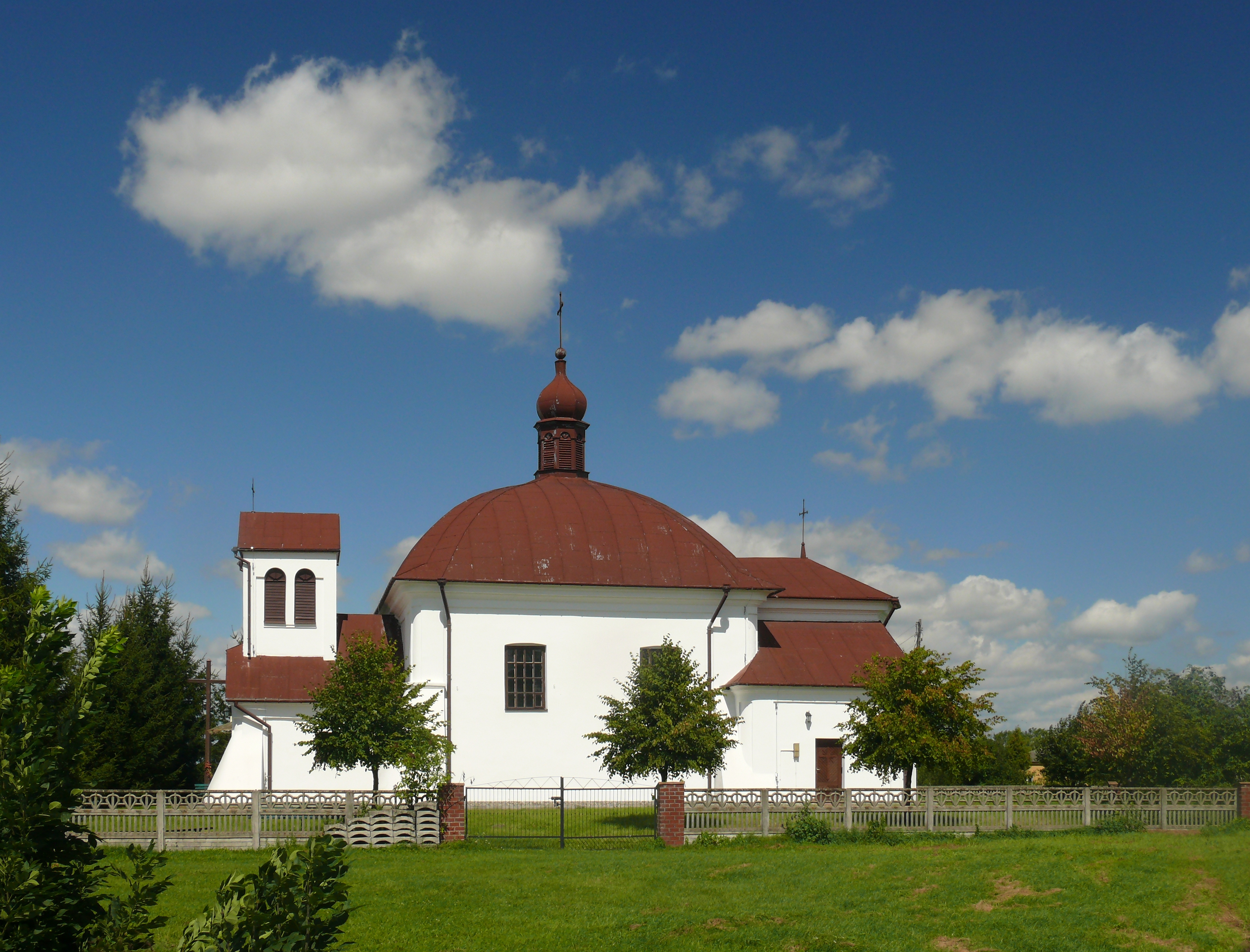
- Our Lady Queen of Poland church

- Location within Poland
- Coordinates: 50°41′N 23°54′E
- Country: Poland
- Voivodeship: Lublin
- County: Hrubieszów
- Gmina: Mircze

Modryń [ˈmɔdrɨɲ] is a village in the administrative district of Gmina Mircze, within Hrubieszów County, Lublin Voivodeship, in eastern Poland, close to the border of Ukraine.

Modryń

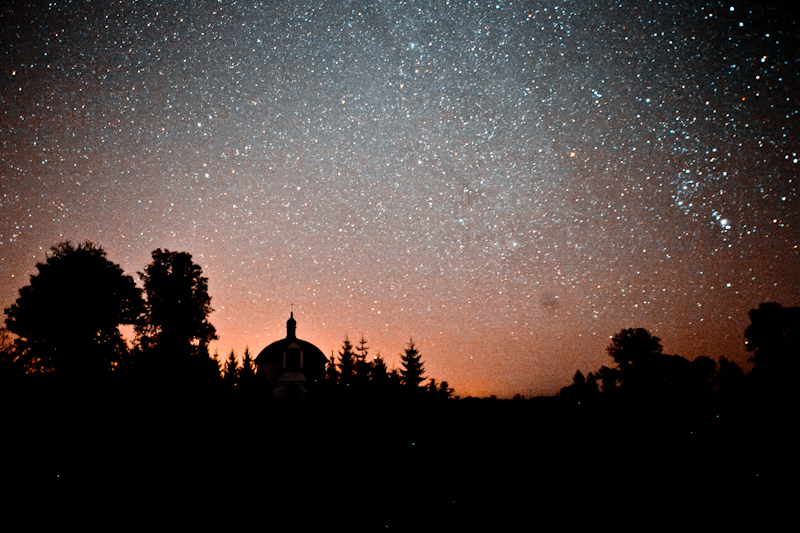
Church in Modryń at night

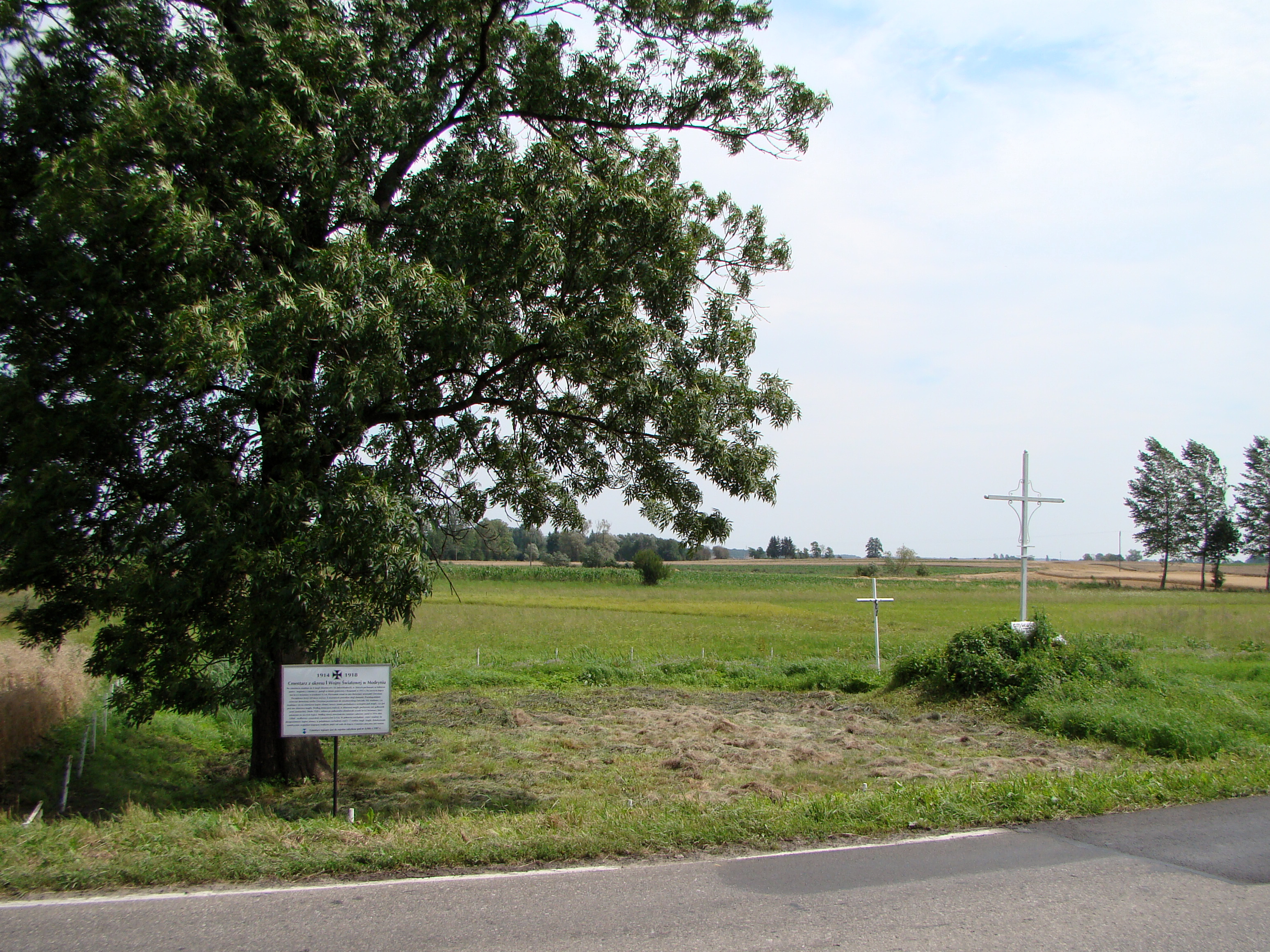
World War I cemetery
