= Polany, Lublin Voivodeship =

Polany
- Village
- Location within Poland
- Coordinates: 50°36′N 23°21′E
- Country: Poland
- Voivodeship: Lublin
- County: Tomaszów
- Gmina: Krynice

Polany [pɔˈlanɨ] is a village in the administrative district of Gmina Krynice, within Tomaszów County, Lublin Voivodeship, in eastern Poland.
