= Rulikówka =

- Village
- Location within Poland
- Coordinates: 50°40′04″N 23°54′38″E
- Country: Poland
- Voivodeship: Lublin
- County: Hrubieszów
- Gmina: Mircze

Rulikówka [ruliˈkufka] is a village in the administrative district of Gmina Mircze, within Hrubieszów County, Lublin Voivodeship, in eastern Poland, close to the border with Ukraine.

== History ==
On February 10, 1940, the town was seized by the Soviet Union, along with the rest of eastern Poland during Soviet invasion of Poland. The town was evacuated by force; its former inhabitants brought by train to Arkhangelsk, Siberia.

It was occupied by Nazi Germany in 1941. The Soviet Union conquered the region in 1944.

It was formerly in the Lwów District of Poland. When the nation was taken by the Soviets, the bulk of the district went as well and the association was lost.
