= Sahryń =

Sahryń Сагринь
- Village

- Location within Poland
- Coordinates: 50°41′N 23°48′E
- Country: Poland
- Voivodeship: Lublin
- County: Hrubieszów
- Gmina: Werbkowice

Sahryń [ˈsaxrɨɲ] (Ukrainian: Сагринь) is a village in the administrative district of Gmina Werbkowice, within Hrubieszów County, Lublin Voivodeship, in eastern Poland.

In 1944 the Sahryń massacre occurred in the village.
