= Prehoryłe =

- Village
- Interactive map of Prehoryłe
- Location within Poland
- Coordinates: 50°41′N 24°4′E
- Country: Poland
- Voivodeship: Lublin
- County: Hrubieszów
- Gmina: Mircze
- Population: 401
- Website: prehoryleinformacje.republika.pl

Prehoryłe [prɛxɔˈrɨwɛ] is a village in the administrative district of Gmina Mircze, within Hrubieszów County, Lublin Voivodeship, in eastern Poland, close to the border with Ukraine.
