= Górka-Zabłocie =

- Village
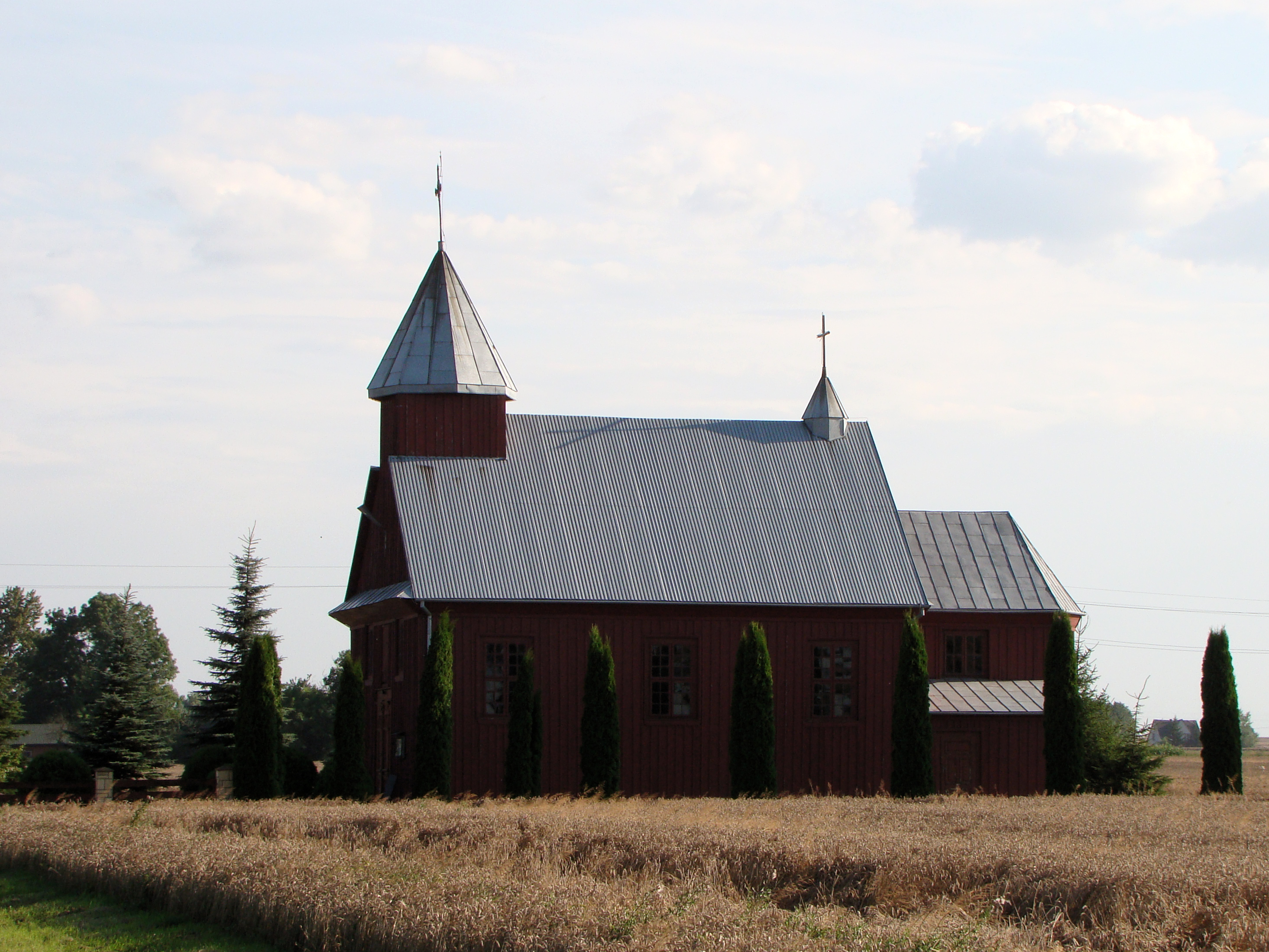
- Church in Górka-Zabłocie

- Location within Poland
- Coordinates: 50°39′08″N 23°58′14″E
- Country: Poland
- Voivodeship: Lublin
- County: Hrubieszów
- Gmina: Mircze

Górka-Zabłocie [ˈɡurka zaˈbwɔt͡ɕɛ] is a village in the administrative district of Gmina Mircze, within Hrubieszów County, Lublin Voivodeship, in eastern Poland, close to the border with Ukraine.

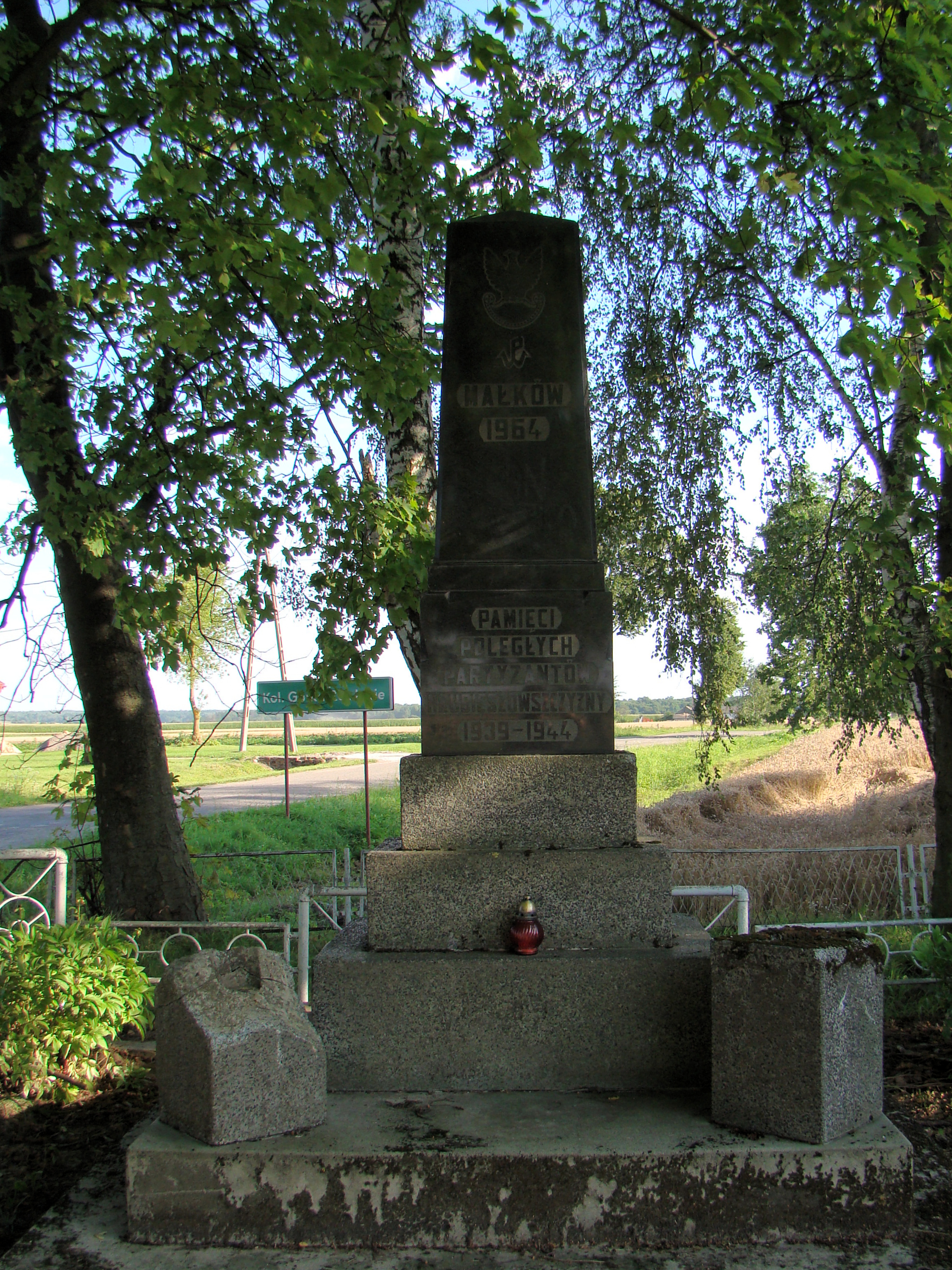
Memorial of guerrilla soldiers from Hrubieszów region
