= Małków, Hrubieszów County =

Małków
- Village
- Location within Poland
- Coordinates: 50°39′N 24°1′E
- Country: Poland
- Voivodeship: Lublin
- County: Hrubieszów
- Gmina: Mircze
- Population: 450

Małków [ˈmau̯kuf] is a village in the administrative district of Gmina Mircze, within Hrubieszów County, Lublin Voivodeship, in eastern Poland, close to the border with Ukraine.

In 2013, the Lasting Memory Foundation erected a memorial to the 49 Jews from the Chełm-Hrubieszów-Sokal death march who were murdered in the village of Małków.
