= Kryłów =

- Village
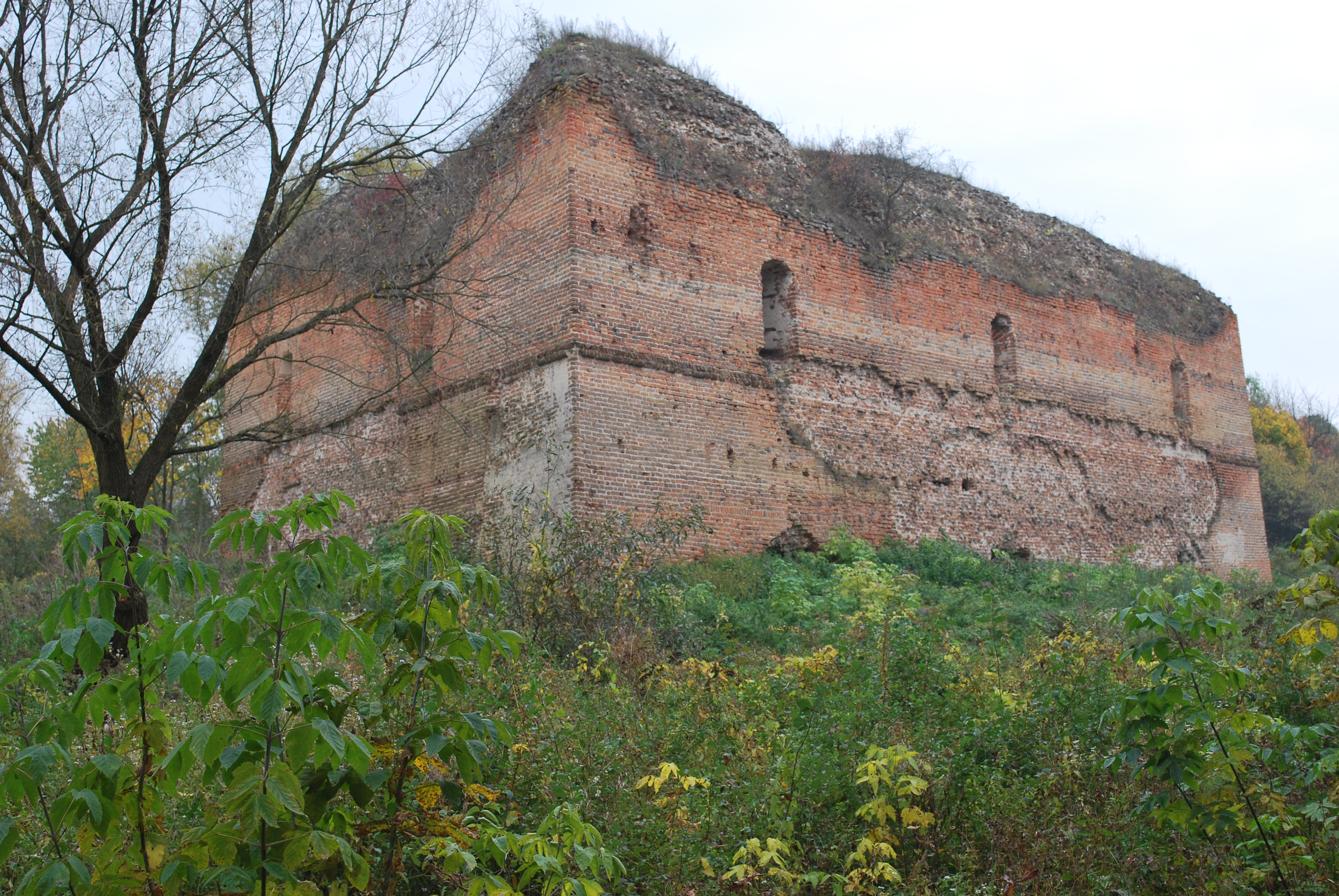
- Kryłów Castle

- Location within Poland
- Coordinates: 50°40′54″N 24°3′22″E
- Country: Poland
- Voivodeship: Lublin
- County: Hrubieszów
- Gmina: Mircze

Population
  - Total: 365
- Time zone: UTC+1 (CET)
  - Summer (DST): UTC+2 (CEST)
- Postal code: 22-530
- Vehicle registration: LHR
- Website: https://krylow.info

Kryłów ([ˈkrɨwuf]) is a village in the administrative district of Gmina Mircze, within Hrubieszów County, Lublin Voivodeship, in eastern Poland, close to the border with Ukraine.

== History ==
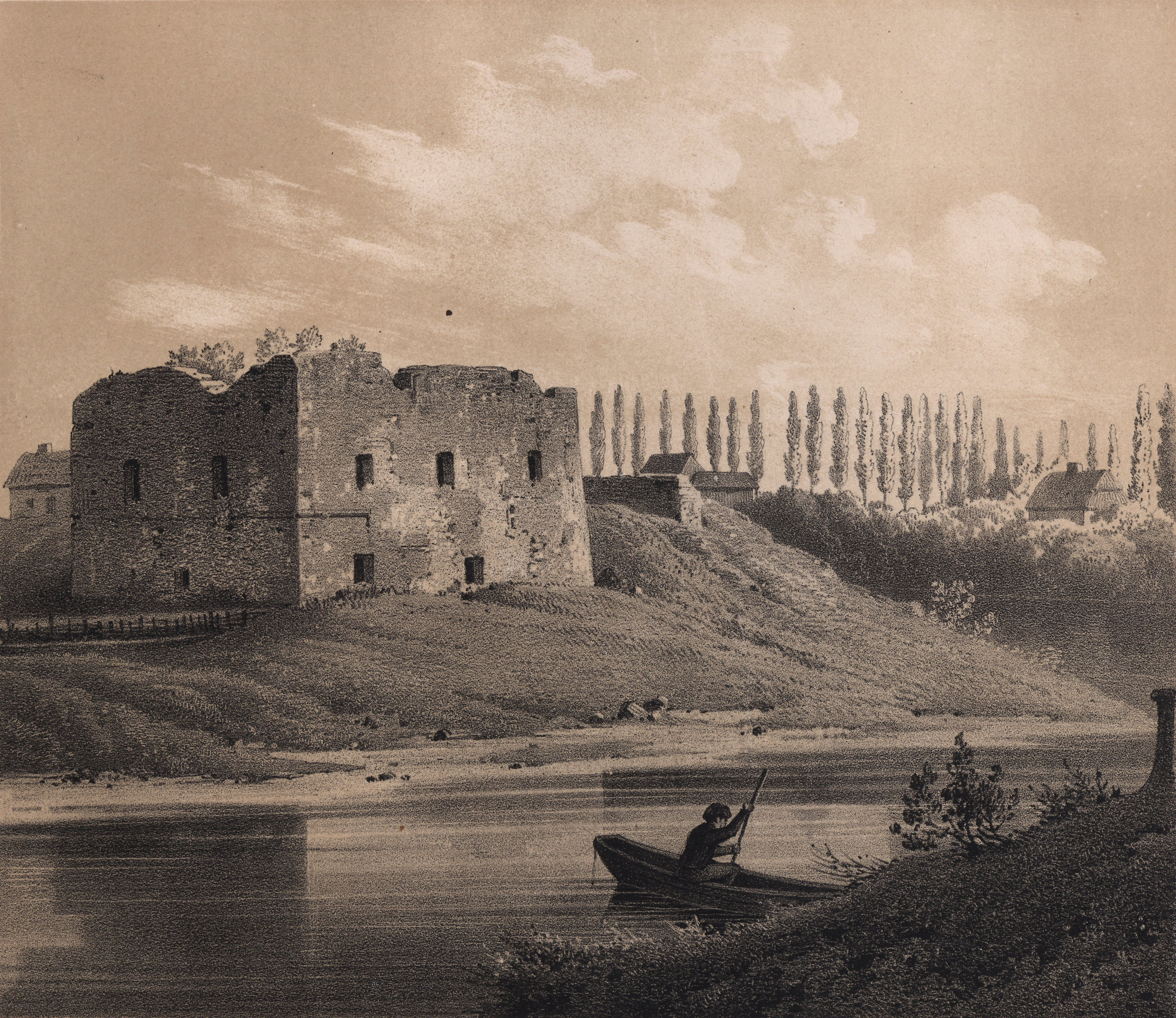
Mid-19th-century view of the Kryłów Castle

The settlement grew up next to the castle, which served as a place of refuge for the local population in case of Tatar raids. In the 16th century the castle became the seat of the Ostroróg family. In 1635, Mikołaj Ostroróg built a Catholic church. Later on, the castle passed to the Radziejowski, Prażmowski, Chrzanowski and Horodyski families.

=== Jewish community ===
The Jewish population numbered 750 Jews in 1921. Many Jews had left the village during World War I because of its proximity to the battlefront and moved to larger towns in the Lublin district, particularly Hrubieszów. In the interwar period the Jewish community continued its traditional crafts and trading in the village. Their way of life was religious and the Zionist movement also exerted considerable influence. At the end of September, 1939 the village was occupied by the Germans. Many Jews fled across the Bug River into what is now Ukraine but at the time was a part of Poland.

The remainder were herded into a ghetto. The Jewish community was wiped out in the summer of 1942. It is unclear how the Jews of the town were exterminated, except that some were sent to the Belzec extermination camp while others were murdered in the town itself. The only survivors were those who managed to escape to the woods.

== Castle ==
There is a castle on an island on the Bug River. The castle was built in the 14th century by J. Ostroróg. In the 17th century the Radziejowski family extended the castle and added reinforcements. The castle was destroyed in the middle of the 17th century. The castle, largely in disrepair, is yet to be archeologically investigated. It's said to be haunted by the ghost of an owner's daughter.
