= Łasków =

Łasków Laskiv
- Village
- The centre of the village

- Location within Poland
- Coordinates: 50°38′N 23°57′E
- Country: Poland
- Voivodeship: Lublin
- County: Hrubieszów
- Gmina: Mircze

Łasków ([ˈwaskuf]; Ukrainian: Ласків, romanized: Laskiv) is a village in the administrative district of Gmina Mircze, within Hrubieszów County, Lublin Voivodeship, in eastern Poland, close to the border with Ukraine.

On 10 March 1944 at least 327 local civilians, most of them of Ukrainian ethnicity, were murdered by units of the Polish Home Army and Peasant Battalions. In October 2026 excavation of the victims' bodies was organized by the Ukrainian Institute of National Remembrance (UINM) with the permission of the Polish authorities. On the 14 of October the UINM made public that it had uncovered the remains of 30 people during excavations.
