= Ukrainian Auxiliary Police =

Ukrainian collaborationist police units during World War II

Ukrainische Hilfspolizei Ukrainian Auxiliary Police
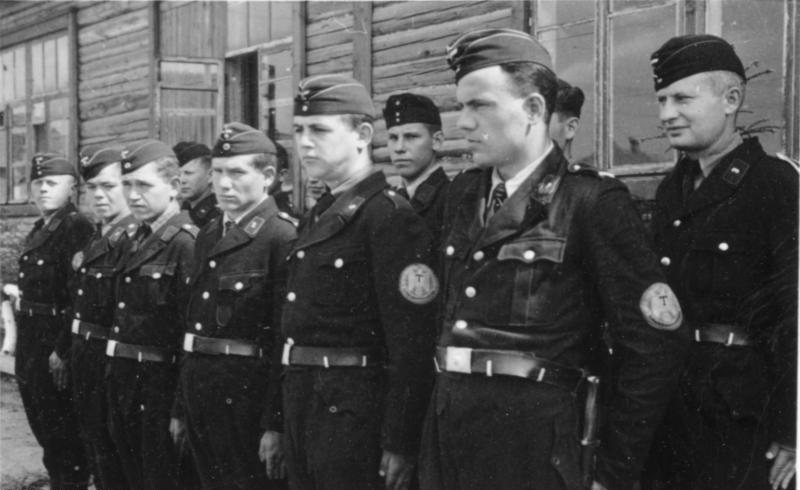
- Active: 27 July 1941
- Countries: German-occupied Europe including Reichskommissariat Ukraine and District of Galicia
- Allegiance: Nazi Germany
- Role: Auxiliary police, were responsible for mass murder and extermination of the Jewish people in Ukrainian Soviet Socialist Republic
- Engagements: World War II; Eastern Front of World War II; The Holocaust in Ukraine; Bila Tserkva massacre; Kamianets-Podilskyi massacre; Babi Yar; Polish–Ukrainian conflict (1939–1947); Battle of Mieniany; Zamość uprising; Battles of Prehoryłe; Battle of Zabłocie; Soviet–Ukrainian partisan conflict (1941–1944); Anti-partisan operations in Belarus; Operation Spring Festival; Operation Winterzauber; Polish resistance movement in World War II

The Ukrainian Auxiliary Police (German: Ukrainische Hilfspolizei; Ukrainian: Українська допоміжна поліція, romanized: Ukrainska dopomizhna politsiia) was the official title of the local police formation (a type of hilfspolizei) set up by Nazi Germany during World War II in Eastern Galicia and Reichskommissariat Ukraine, shortly after the German occupation of the Western Ukrainian SSR in Operation Barbarossa.

The Ukrainian Auxiliary Police was created by Heinrich Himmler in mid-August 1941 and put under the control of German Ordnungspolizei within General Government. The actual Reichskommissariat Ukraine was formed officially on 20 August 1941. The uniformed force was composed in large part of the former members of the Ukrainian People's Militia created by the Banderite faction of the Organization of Ukrainian Nationalists (OUN-B) in June. There were two categories of German-controlled Ukrainian armed organisations. The first comprised mobile police units most often called Schutzmannschaft, or Schuma, organized on the battalion level and which engaged in the murder of Jews and in security warfare in most areas of Ukraine. It was subordinated directly to the German Commander of the Order Police for the area.

The second category was the local police force (approximately, a constabulary), called simply the Ukrainian Police (UP) by the German administration, which the SS raised most successfully in the District of Galicia (formed 1 August 1941) extending south-east from the General Government. Notably, the District of Galicia was a separate administrative unit from the actual Reichskommissariat Ukraine. They were not connected with each other politically.

The UP formations appeared as well further east in German-occupied Soviet Ukraine in significant towns and cities such as Kyiv. The urban based forces were subordinated to the city's German Commander of State protection police (Schutzpolizei or Schupo); the rural police posts were subordinated to the area German Commander of Gendarmerie. The Schupo and Gendarmerie structures were themselves subordinated to the area Commander of Order Police.

== History ==
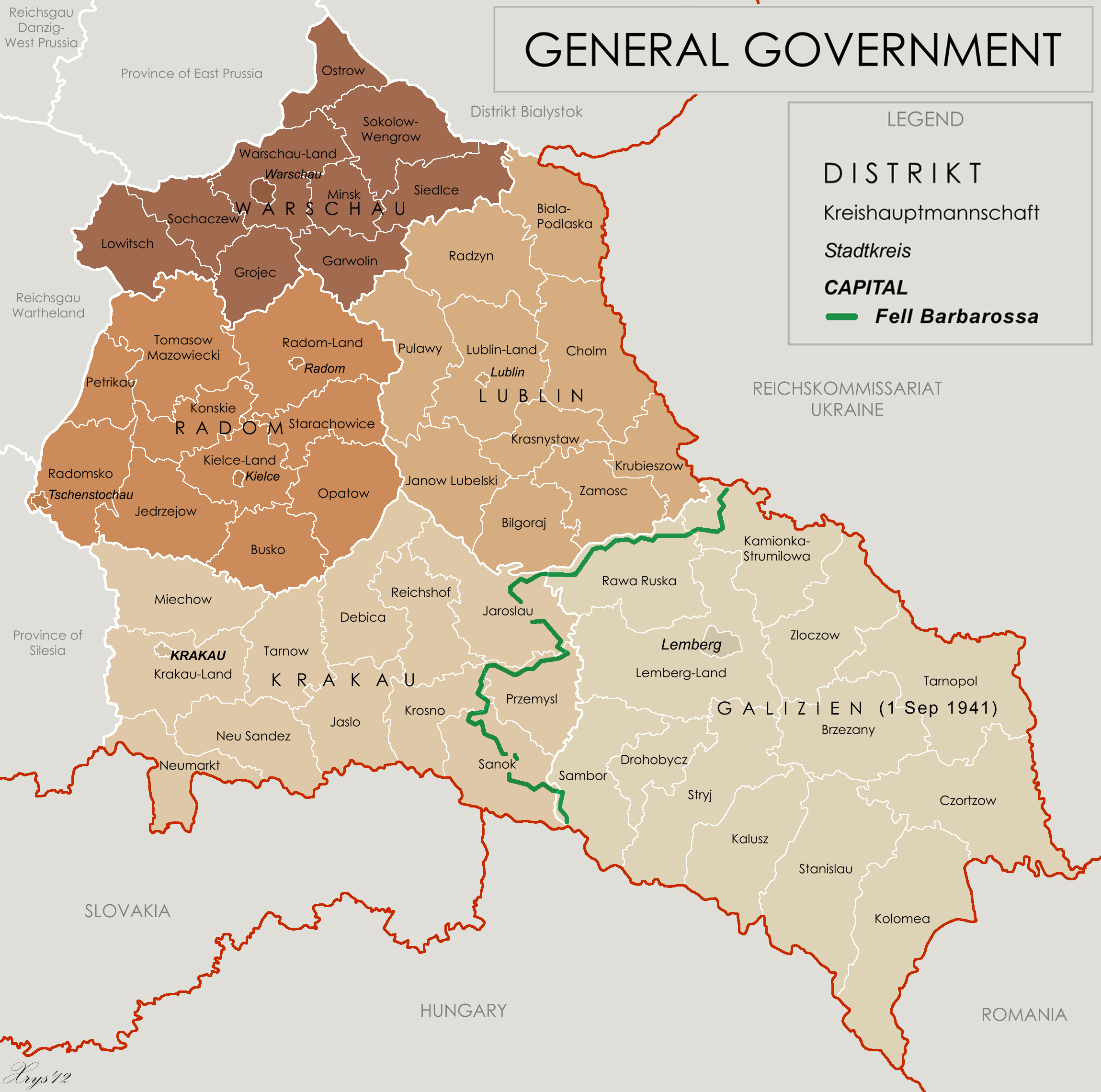
Map of the German District of Galicia as of 1 September 1941

The local municipal police force (UP) in the occupied Ukrainian SSR came into existence right after the commencement of Operation Barbarossa. It was the result of an order issued on 27 July 1941 by the German commander in chief of the Order Police in occupied Kraków. The Ukrainian auxiliary police in the new District of Galicia fell under the command of the German office for the General Government.

An actual ethnic Ukrainian command centre did not exist. The top Ukrainian police officer, Vladimir Pitulay, rose to the rank of major and became the district commandant (Major der Ukrainische Polizei und Kommandeur) in Lemberg (now Lviv). A police school was established in Lviv by the district SS-and-Police Leader in order to meet plans for growth. The school director was Ivan Kozak. The total number of enlisted men in the new politically independent District of Galicia amounted 5,000 people (out of the planned 6000, as the police was perceived negatively in Galicia due to German actions in Ukraine) including 120 low-level officers who served there. The units were used primarily to keep order and carry out constabulary duties. Their actions were restricted by other police groups such as the Sonderdienst, made up of Volksdeutsche; the Kripo (Criminal police); Bahnschutz (railroad and transport police); and the Werkschutz, who kept order and guarded industrial plants. They were supported by the Ukrainian Protection Police and the Ukrainian Order Police.

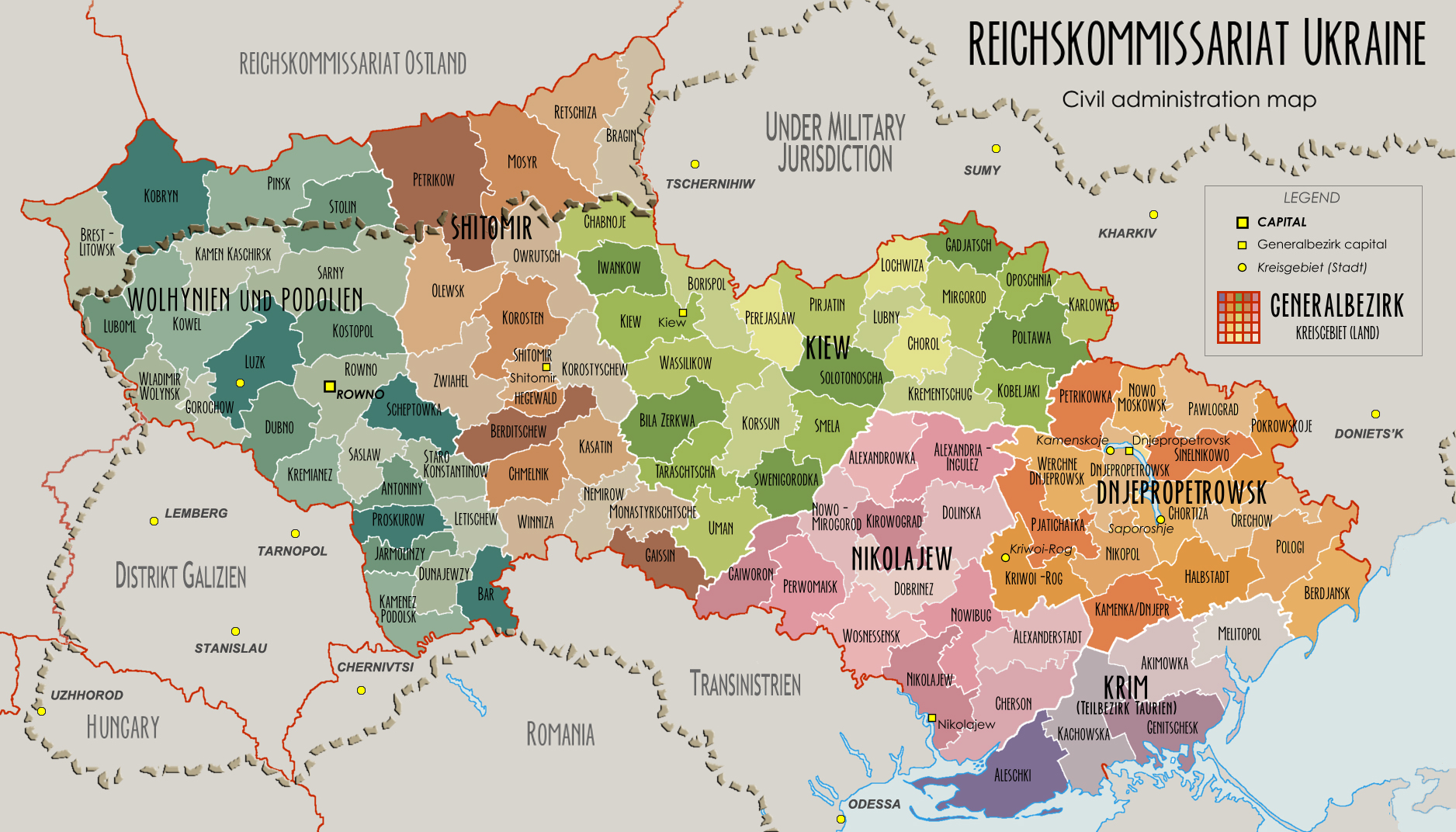
Map of the Reichskommissariat Ukraine superimposed with outline of modern-day Ukraine

In the newly formed Reichskommissariat Ukraine the auxiliary police forces were generally named Schutzmannschaft, and amounted to more than 35,000 men throughout all of the occupied territories, with 5000 in Galicia. The names of battalions reflected their geographic jurisdiction. The make-up of the officer corps was representative of Germany's foreign policy. Professor Wendy Lower from Towson University wrote that although Ukrainians greatly outnumbered other non-Germans in the auxiliary police, only the ethnically German Volksdeutsche from Ukraine were given the leadership roles. Many of those who joined the ranks of the police had served as militiamen under Soviet rule since the invasion of Poland in 1939. Professor Tadeusz Piotrowski wrote that the majority of Ukrainische Hilfspolizei in Galicia came from OUN-B, which was confirmed by Professor John-Paul Himka as an important transitional stage of OUN involvement in the Holocaust. According to Andrew Gregorovich, the ethnic composition of Auxiliary Police reflected the demographics of the land and included not only Ukrainians but also Russians from among the Soviet POWs, Poles drafted from the local population, and German Volksdeutsche of all nationalities. However, Browning (Ordinary Men) and Lower both insist that, for the German administration, nobody but the "Ukrainians and local ethnic Germans could be relied upon to assist with the killing". Also, according to Aleksandr Prusin most members were ethnically Ukrainian, hence the name or the force.

In some cases, the personnel of the Ukrainian auxiliary police depended on the institution to which it subordinated. For example, in Kyiv, superior posts in the Ukrainian guard police (Schutzmannschaft-Einzeldienst) hierarchy were frequently held by Ukrainian People's Army veterans and members of the OUN-M; the inferior positions were occupied by the local inhabitants and POWs. On the contrary, the OUN had no influence on the Ukrainian criminal police (Sicherheitsschutzmannschaft), which consisted of former Soviet jurists, communists, militsioners, and Volksdeutsche. Moreover, some of them hunted for "colleagues" after the German authorities started anti-OUN repression on the edge of 1941-42. Despite ideological differences, the personnel of these two police institutions cooperated in the arrests of Jews, communists, and other "political enemies" of the German authorities. The total number of all Schutzmannschaft employees in Kyiv fluctuated between 1,800 - 2,000 (March 1943).

The auxiliary police were directly under the command of the Germanic SS, the Einsatzgruppen, and military administration.

== Participation in the Holocaust ==
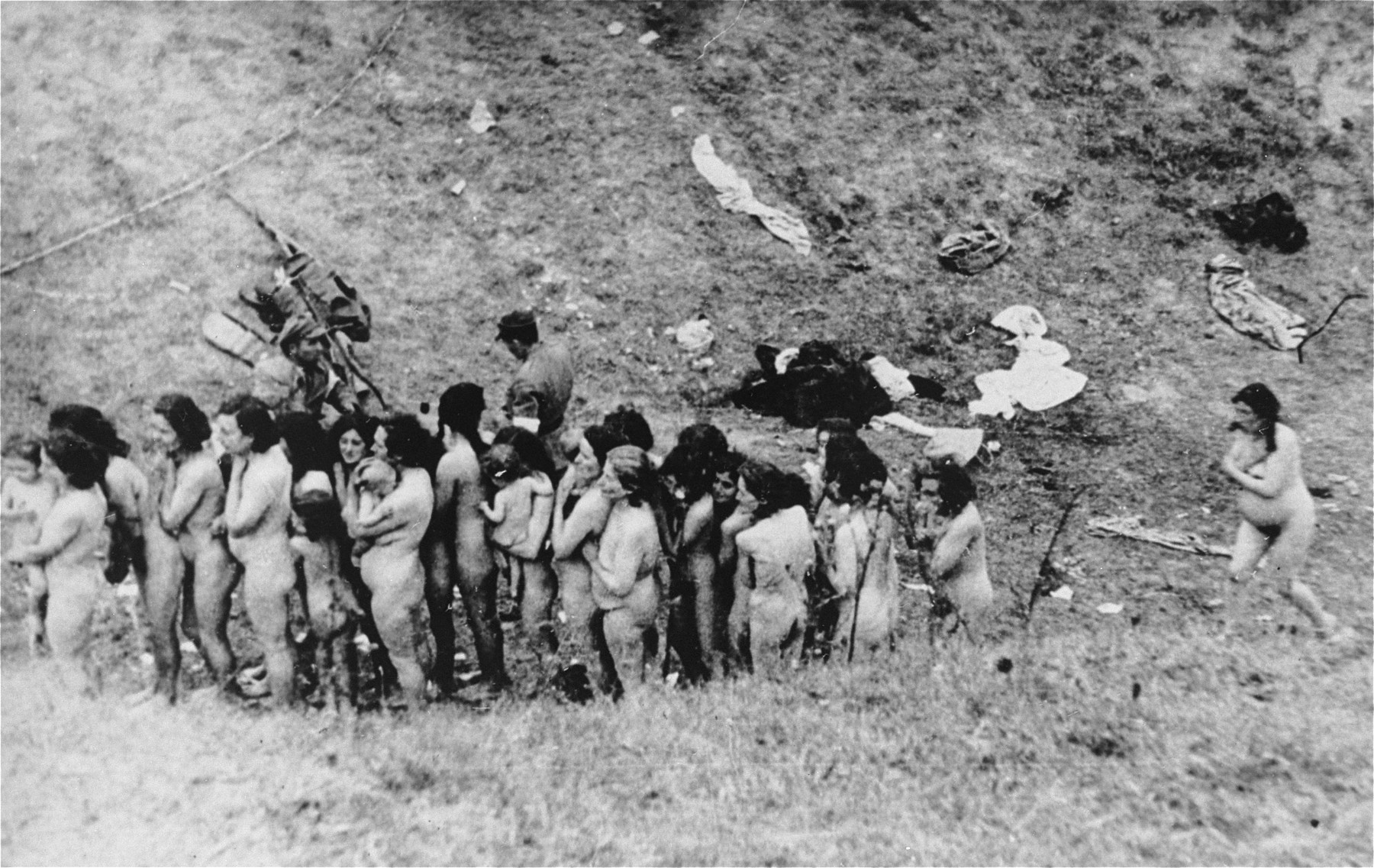
Naked Jewish women, some of whom are holding infants, wait in a line before their execution by German Sipo and SD, with the assistance of Ukrainian auxiliaries.

The Ukrainian auxiliary police played a vital role in the execution of the Holocaust. Professor Alexander Statiev of the Canadian University of Waterloo writes that Ukrainian Auxiliary Police were the major perpetrator of the Holocaust in the Soviet Union based on native origins, and those police units participated in the extermination of 150,000 Jews in the area of Volhynia alone. German historian Dieter Pohl in The Shoah in Ukraine writes that the auxiliary police was active during killing operations by the Germans already in the first phases of the German occupation. The auxiliary police registered the Jews, conducted raids and guarded ghettos, loaded convoys to execution sites and cordoned them off. There is a possibility that some 300 auxiliary policemen from Kyiv helped organize the massacre in Babi Yar. They also took part in the massacre in Dnipro, where the field command noted that the cooperation ran "smoothly in every way". Cases where local commandants ordered murder of Jews using police force are known. In killings of Jews in Kryvyi Rih the "entire Ukrainian auxiliary police" was put to use.

== Persecution of Poles ==
Defining nationality of Ukrainian policemen using present-day classifications is problematic, because in German-occupied eastern Poland (see: District of Galicia) there was no perception of de jure Ukrainian independent statehood. Some Ukrainian Hilfspolizei who harbored a pathological hatred for Poles and Jews – resulting in acts of mass murder – remained formally and legally Polish from the time before the invasion until much later. Thirty years after the war ended, one former Ukrainian policeman, Jan Masłowski (a.k.a. Iwan Maslij), was recognized in Rakłowice near Wrocław by Polish survivors of massacres committed by Ukrainische Hilfspolizei in the towns of Szczepiatyn, Dyniska, Tarnoszyn, Niemstów, and Korczów. He was sentenced to death in Poland in 1978. After being denied clemency, Maslij was hanged at Mokotów Prison on 20 August 1979.

On 13 November 1942, members of the Ukrainische Hilfspolizei robbed and executed 32 Poles and 1 Jew in the village of Obórki (pl), located in prewar Wołyń Voivodeship. After the crime the village was burned down. On 16 December 1942, the Ukrainian policemen, led by Germans, killed 360 Poles in Jezierce (former powiat Rivne).

In Lviv, in late February and March 1944, the Ukrainische Hilfspolizei arrested a number of young men of Polish nationality. Many of them were later found dead and their Identity documents stolen. The Government Delegation for Poland started negotiations with the OUN-B. When they failed, Kedyw began an action called "Nieszpory" (Vespers) where 11 policemen were shot in retaliation and the murders of young Poles in Lviv stopped.

== Role in the Ukrainian Insurgent Army formation ==
For many who joined the police force, enlistment served as an opportunity to receive military training and direct access to weapons. Bandera's OUN leadership on 20 March 1943 issued secret instructions ordering their members who had joined the German auxiliary police to desert with their weapons and join with the military detachment of OUN (B) units in Volyn. The number of trained and armed policemen who in spring 1943 joined the ranks of the future Ukrainian Insurgent Army were estimated to be 10,000. This process in some places involved engaging in armed conflict with German forces as they tried to prevent desertion.

== Battalions ==
By 1942, after the military administration was replaced with the regular Gendarmerie in occupied East, the strength of the Schutzmannschaft had increased tenfold. However, the new recruits were mostly not in the battalions. Instead, they took up the individual post duty as militias in place of former local Ordnungsdienst. The actual Security Battalions (or Schumas, German: Schutzmannschaft Bataillone) comprised only one-third of the overall strength of the formation. As a matter of course, the static police wore black uniforms from the pre-war German stock which was no longer used and kept in storage. The black uniforms of the former Allgemeine-SS including their characteristic field caps were simply stripped of German insignia and given to Schutzmannschaft to use with the new patches. Gradually, the mobile units were issued field-grey uniforms (pictured). The desired size of each battalion was about 500 soldiers divided into three companies of 140-150 men each, with 50 staff members. The logistical problems with securing enough uniforms for all of them continued until late 1942. For the weapons, the most widely used were captured Russian military rifles and pistols. Machine guns remained scarce until the latter stages of the war.

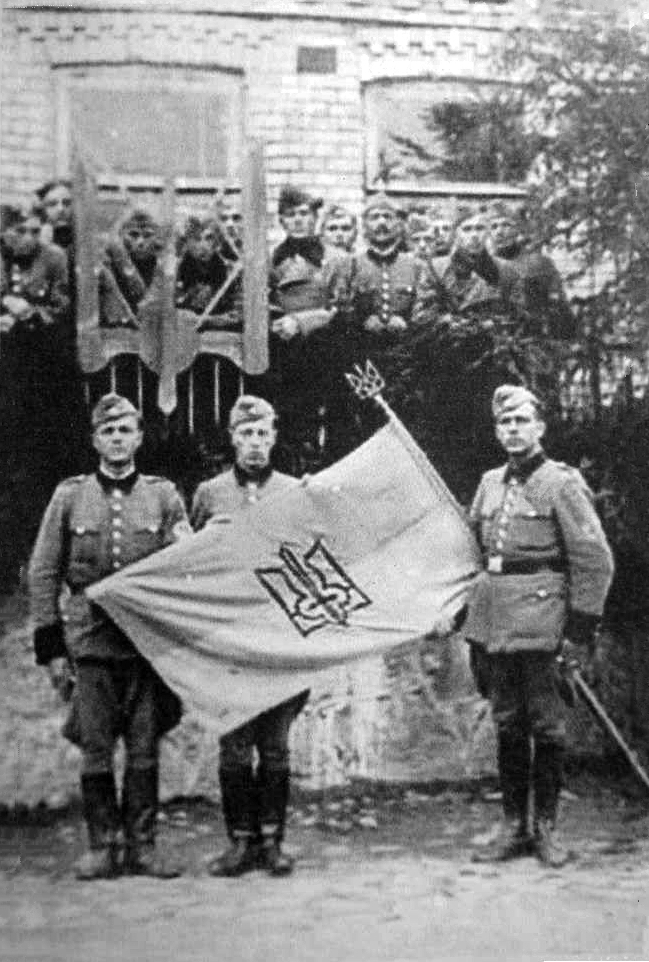
Ukrainian Schutzmannschaft battalion photographed in 1942

Most battalions were assigned block numbers based on ethnic and national makeup for ease of recognition. Those in Russia South and the heart of Ukraine were numbered from 101 to 200. The ones operating in Russia Center and in Byelorussia were numbered from 51 to 100. An exception was Battalion 201, which was formed not in Galicia but in Frankfurt an der Oder in October 1941, from members of the disbanded Nachtigall Battalion, formed originally by OUN-B.

Russia Center and Byelorussia

Bn. №	Formation	Disbandment	Notes
51		May 1943	
53	August 1942		
54	September 1942		
55	August 1942		
57		Since July 1944, part of Schutzmannschaft-Brigade Siegling; in August, as 30th Waffen Grenadier Division of the SS.	
61		Since July 1944, part of Schutzmannschaft-Brigade Siegling; in August, as 30th Waffen Grenadier Division of the SS.	
62		Since July 1944, part of Schutzmannschaft-Brigade Siegling; in August, as 30th Waffen Grenadier Division of the SS.	
63		Since July 1944, part of Schutzmannschaft-Brigade Siegling; in August, as 30th Waffen Grenadier Division of the SS.	

Russia South and Ukraine

Bn. №	Formation	Disbandment	Notes
101	July 1942		
102	July 1942		
103	July 1942		
104	July 1942		
105	November 1942		
106	November 1942		
108	July 1942		
109	July 1942		
110	July 1942		
111	July 1942		
113	July 1942		
114	July 1942		
115	July 1942		Transferred to Belarus right away.
116	July 1942	July 1942	
117	July 1942	July 1942	
118	July 1942		Formed with former Soviet officers at the helm who were soon dispatched in Kyiv to form other battalions. In December 1942, transferred to Minsk.
119	November 1942		
120	November 1942		
121	November 1942		
122	July 1942		
123	July 1942		
124	July 1942		
125	November 1942		
129	July 1942		
130	July 1942		
131	July 1942		
134	November 1942		
136	November 1942		
137	October 1942		
138	October 1942		
139	October 1942		
140	October 1942		
143	August 1942		
144	August 1942		
145	August 1942		
146	August 1942		
155	November 1942		
156	November 1942		
157	November 1942		
158	November 1942		

== See also ==
- 14th Waffen Grenadier Division of the SS (1st Galician)
- Bohdan Koziy
- Belarusian Auxiliary Police
- Collaboration with the Axis Powers
- Estonian Auxiliary Police
- Foreign relations of the Axis powers
- Latvian Auxiliary Police
- Lithuanian Auxiliary Police Battalions
- Responsibility for the Holocaust
- Schutzmannschaft Battalion 118
- The Holocaust in Poland
- The Holocaust in Ukraine
- Ukrainian collaboration with Nazi Germany
