= Peasant Battalions =

Polish partisan organisation during World War II

- Bataliony Chłopskie
- Other name: BCh
- Leader: Franciszek Kamiński
- Dates active: 1940–1945
- Country: General Government
- Allegiance: People's Party
- Ideology: Agrarian socialism
- Political position: Anti-Nazi
- Size: 160,000 (in 1944)

Peasant Battalions (Polish: Bataliony Chłopskie, abbreviated as BCh) was a Polish resistance movement, guerrilla and partisan organisation, during World War II. The organisation was created in mid-1940 by the agrarian political party People's Party and by 1944 was partially integrated with the Armia Krajowa (Home Army). At its height in summer 1944 the organisation had 160,000 members.

== History ==
Initially after the occupation of Poland by the Soviet Union and Germany, the peasant parties were reluctant to forming their own armed resistance forces. Since mid-1940 several smaller groups were formed, mostly for the self-defence of Polish peasants against German terror and economic policies. Most members of peasant parties grouped into the CKRL (Central Directorate of Peasant Movement) who received military training before the war were transferred to other armed resistance organizations, most notably to ZWZ.

However, in early 1941 it was decided that an armed force be created. The core of the newly formed BCh came from the earlier organization Chłostra (an acronym of Chłopska Straż - Farmers' Guard), as well as from other underground organizations of the farmers movement, such as Związek Młodzieży Wiejskiej (Association of Rural Youth), Chłopska Organizacja Wolności "Racławice" (Peasants' Freedom Organization "Racławice") and Centralny Związek Młodej Wsi "Siew" (Central Union of Village Youth "Sowing").

The structure of the BCh was based on pre-war administrative divisions of Poland. Areas were roughly correspondent to pre-war Voivodeships, and were further divided onto districts (based on powiats) and commune-based units. By mid-1943 10 areas were formed:

1. Warsaw
2. Warsaw Voivodeship
3. Kielce
4. Lublin
5. Łódź
6. Kraków, Rzeszów, Silesia
7. Białystok
8. Volhynia
9. Lwów, Stanisławów, Tarnopol
10. Poznań

Each of the areas fielded its own armed units. The units were basically of two types:

1. territorial militias - created for self-defense, sabotage and preparation of future all-national uprising
2. tactical units - strictly militarized, created for use as the core of the future all-national uprising

The units of the latter type were later mostly joined with the Armia Krajowa. The commander of the BCh was Franciszek Kamiński, his chiefs of staff were Kazimierz Banach (until 1942) and S. Koter.

During the process of unification of Polish underground, large part (approximately 50 000 men) of the BCh soldiers was integrated by the Government Delegate's Office at Home with Armia Krajowa and Państwowy Korpus Bezpieczeństwa. Also, by early 1943 part of the tactical units were transformed into Special Units specialized in diversion and reprisal actions. An estimate for summer 1944 the Bataliony Chłopskie had approximately 160 000 members grouped in 70 units. However, the full unification with the Armia Krajowa did not occur until the end of the war.

After the Red Army entered Poland, elements of the BCh started to cooperate with the communist-backed Armia Ludowa, while the majority remained loyal to the Polish government. However, the incoming end of the war, as well as information of the Yalta Conference made further resistance futile and on 2 April 1945 most of the Bataliony Chłopskie units came out from the underground. Some of the soldiers were arrested by the communists, while others joined the reestablished People's Party of Stanisław Mikołajczyk. Formally the Bataliony Chłopskie were dissolved in September 1945.

== Tasks and actions ==
The main tasks of Bataliony Chłopskie were:

1. Defense of the peasants against German economic exploitation
2. Defense of peasants against expulsions
3. Self-defense against German terror
4. Aid to the expelled, Jews, the intelligentsia, and to the families of those enslaved by the Germans.

The first major actions of armed resistance began in late 1942 when the Zamość area, due to its fertile black soil, was chosen for German colonization as part of Generalplan Ost. Polish farmers were expropriated and forcibly expelled from the farms with great brutality. Their farms were handed over to German settlers. A minority of the children were separated from their parents and after racial scrutiny sent over to Germany to be raised in German families, but thousands of those "not suitable for Germanization" were dispatched to perform slave labor for the Germans or were murdered by the Germans. After several major battles against German units (the most notable being the battles of Wojda, Róża and Zaboreczno), the Germans had to halt the expulsions and in the end very few German settlers were brought to the area (see Zamość Uprising).

Other major actions included liberation of prisoners from prisons in Pińczów and Krasnystaw as well as the sinking of the German river patrol ship Tannenberg on the Vistula.

1st Battalion of the Peasant Battalions:

https://asaland.proboards.com/thread/577/1st-bch-battalion-hrubiesz-detachments

== See also ==
- History of Poland (1939–45)
- Cichociemni
