= Second Pawlak cabinet =

Second Cabinet of Waldemar Pawlak
- 5th Cabinet of Poland
- 1993-1995
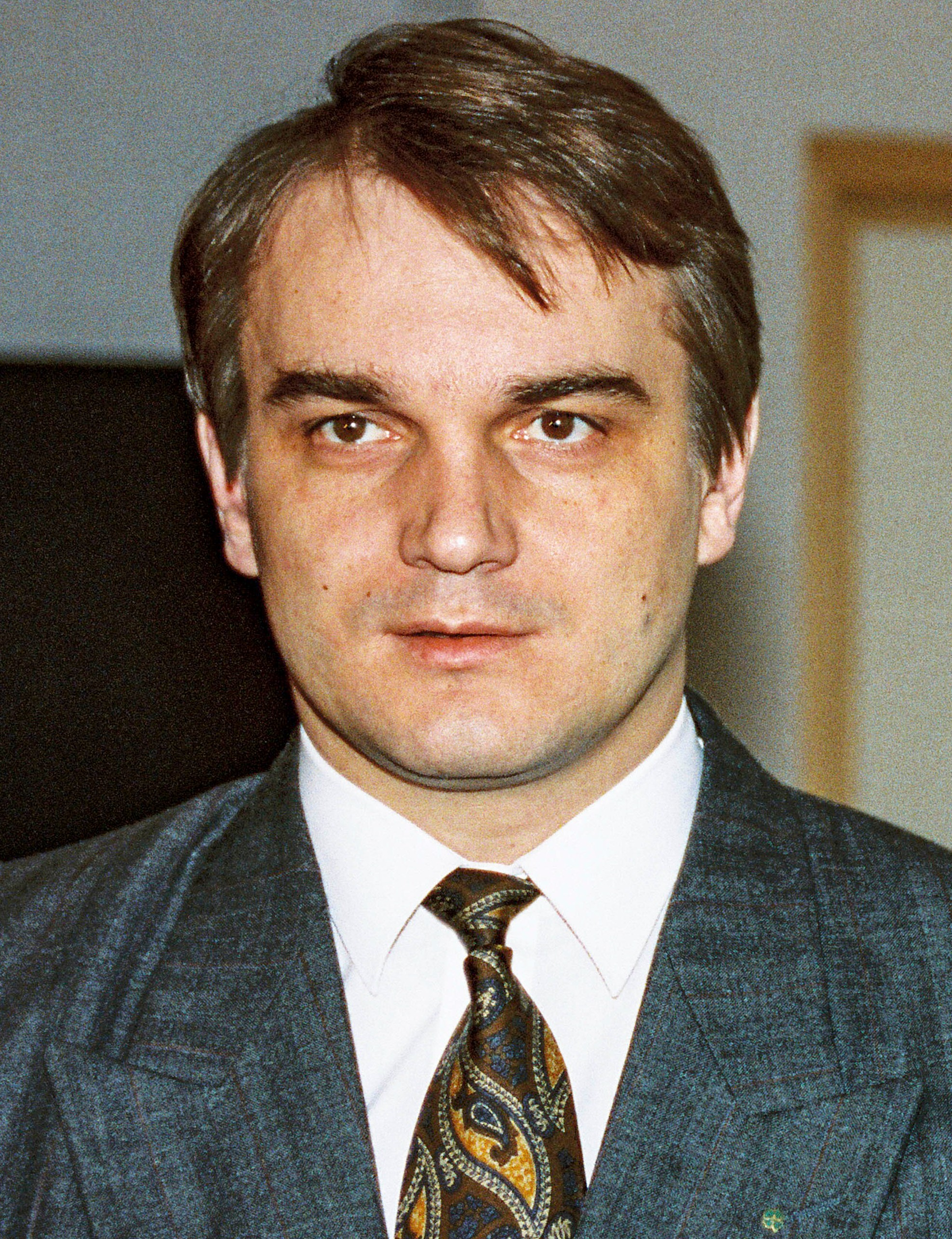
- Waldemar Pawlak (1994)
- Date formed: 18 October 1993
- Date dissolved: 6 March 1995

People and organisations
- Head of state: Lech Wałęsa
- Head of government: Waldemar Pawlak
- Deputy head of government: Marek Borowski; Włodzimierz Cimoszewicz; Aleksander Łuczak
- Member party: Democratic Left Alliance Polish People's Party
- Status in legislature: Coalition government
- Opposition party: Democratic Union Labour Union (confidence in 1993) Confederation of Independent Poland Nonpartisan Bloc for Support of Reforms
- Opposition leader: Tadeusz Mazowiecki

History
- Election: 1993 Polish parliamentary election
- Predecessor: Suchocka
- Successor: Oleksy

Second Cabinet of Waldemar Pawlak was the government of Poland from 18 October 1993 – 6 March 1995 during the 2nd legislature of the Sejm and the 3rd legislature of the Senate. It was appointed by President Lech Wałęsa on 18 October 1993, and passed the vote of confidence in Sejm on 10 November 1993. Led by Waldemar Pawlak, it is a centre-left coalition of two major parties: social democratic Democratic Left Alliance (SLD) and the agrarian Polish People's Party (PSL). Waldemar Pawlak succeeded Hanna Suchocka, who was the first female Polish Prime Minister.

Office	Incumbent	Party	Term
Prime Minister	Waldemar Pawlak	Polish People's Party	18 October 1993 - 6 March 1995
Deputy Prime Minister, Minister of Finance	Marek Borowski	Democratic Left Alliance	18 October 1993 - 8 February 1994
Deputy Prime Minister, Minister of Justice, Public Prosecutor General	Włodzimierz Cimoszewicz	Democratic Left Alliance	18 October 1993 - 6 March 1995
Minister of National Education	Aleksander Łuczak	Polish People's Party	18 October 1993 - 6 March 1995
Minister of Agriculture and Food Economy	Andrzej Śmietanko	Polish People's Party	18 October 1993 - 6 March 1995
Administrator of Central Planning Office	Mirosław Pietrewicz	Polish People's Party	18 October 1993 - 6 March 1995
Chairman of Committee of Research	Witold Karczewski	Democratic Left Alliance	18 October 1993 - 6 March 1995
Minister of Communications	Andrzej Zieliński	Democratic Left Alliance	18 October 1993 - 6 March 1995
Minister of Culture and Arts	Kazimierz Dejmek	Polish People's Party	18 October 1993 - 6 March 1995
Minister of Economic Co-operation with Foreign Countries	Lesław Podkański	Polish People's Party	18 October 1993 - 6 March 1995
Minister of Environment Protection, Natural Resources and Forestry	Stanisław Żelichowski	Polish People's Party	18 October 1993 - 6 March 1995
Minister of Finance	Grzegorz Kołodko	Democratic Left Alliance	28 April 1994 - 6 March 1995
Minister of Foreign Affairs	Andrzej Olechowski	Nonpartisan Bloc for Support of Reforms	18 October 1993 - 1 March 1995
Minister of Health and Social Security	Ryszard Żochowski	Democratic Left Alliance	18 October 1993 - 6 March 1995
Minister of Industry and Commerce	Marek Pol	Labour United	18 October 1993 - 6 March 1995
Minister of Infrastructure and Development	Bogusław Liberadzki	Independent	22 September 2014
Minister of Transport and Marine Economy	Andrzej Milczanowski	Democratic Left Alliance	18 October 1993 - 6 March 1995
Minister of Labour and Social Policy	Leszek Miller	Democratic Left Alliance	18 October 1993 - 6 March 1995
Minister of National Defence	Piotr Kołodziejczyk	Independent	18 October 1993 - 11 November 1994
Minister of National Defence	Zbigniew Okoński	Independent	1 March 1995 - 6 March 1995
Minister of Ownership Transformation	Wiesław Kaczmarek	Democratic Left Alliance	18 October 1993 - 6 March 1995
Minister of Spatial Economy and Construction	Barbara Blida	Democratic Left Alliance	18 October 1993 - 6 March 1995
Chief of the Council of Ministers Office	Michał Strąk	Polish People's Party	18 October 1993 - 6 March 1995
