= Attack on Werbkowice railway station =

Attack on Werbkowice
- Part of Anti-communist resistance in Poland (1944–1953) and Anti-Soviet resistance by UPA
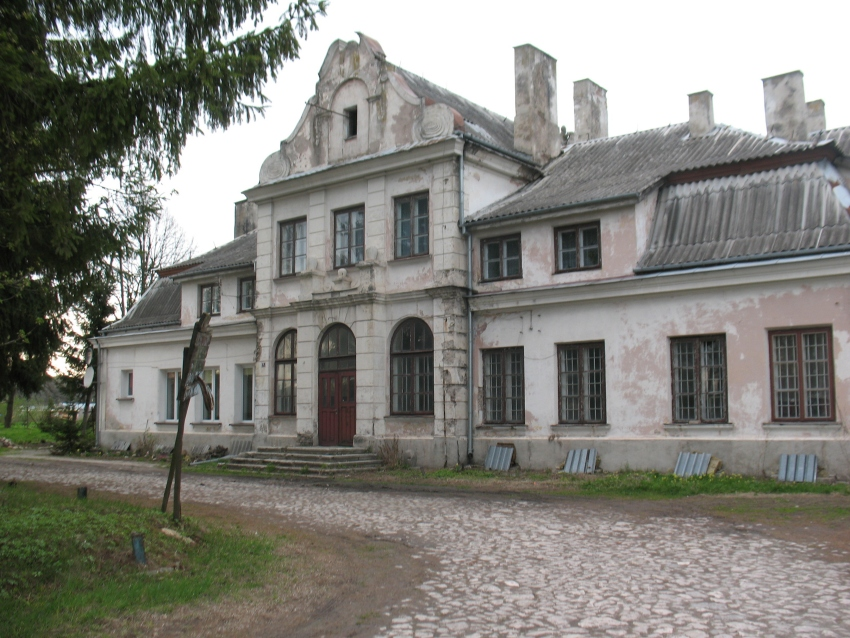
- Werbkowice railway station
| Date | 6 April 1946 |
| Location | Railway station, Werbkowice, Lublin Voivodeship |
| Result | See § Aftermath |

Belligerents
| Ukrainian Insurgent Army; WiN | Polish People's Republic; NKVD |

Commanders and leaders
| Vasyl Koltoniuk; Yevhen Sztendera; Zdzisław Olechowski | Unknown |

Strength
| 12 | Unknown |

Casualties and losses
| 1 killed | 23 disarmed 1 captured |

The Attack on Werbkowice Railway Station was a joint operation of Ukrainian Insurgent Army (UPA) and Polish anti-communist WiN fighters against PPR forces, on 6 April 1946.

== Prelude ==
The attack on Werbkowice station was like planned beforehand in Sahryn on 1 April, 1946. Yevhen Yachuk's UPA sotnia was tasked with blocking roads. UPA intended to disrupt the deportation of Ukrainians to Ukrainian SSR by attacking the station. Right before the attack was carried out, UPA and WiN partisans cut telephone lines.

== Attack ==
On 6 April, the 12-strong Polish-Ukrainian partisan group begun their operation with 2 of their members disguised in PPA uniforms and acted drunk, deceiving the guards in order to approach the station. As the disguised partisans got close, they disarmed the guards without combat and got the passwords from guards.

The UPA and WiN members ordered the captured guards to cooperate, so of them agreed with capturing their arms. UPA took with them resettlement commissioner and likely shot him later. After this, UPA-WiN partisans retreated from the station while the Polish servicemen and NKVD reinforcements tried to pursue them. They caught up with one of WiN commanders by the name of "Los" in Malice settlement, where he was killed. However, his troops managed to flee.

== Aftermath ==
The initial plan of stopping deportation failed as the deportation train set off a day prior to operation. Despite this, the UPA-WiN partisans still conducted a successful attack on the station and seized a number of weapons. On 27 May, another joint UPA-WiN attack took place at Hrubieszów.

== Bibliography ==
- Motyka; Wnuk, Grzegorz; Rafał (1997). Motyka G., Wnuk R. "Pany" i "rezuny". Współpraca AK-WiN i UPA 1945-1947 (in Polish). Warsaw: Wydawnictwo: Oficyna Wydawnicza VOLUMEN. ISBN 83-86857-72-2.
