= Romuald Szeremietiew =

Former Polish Minister of Defense (born 1945)

Professor Romuald Szeremietiew
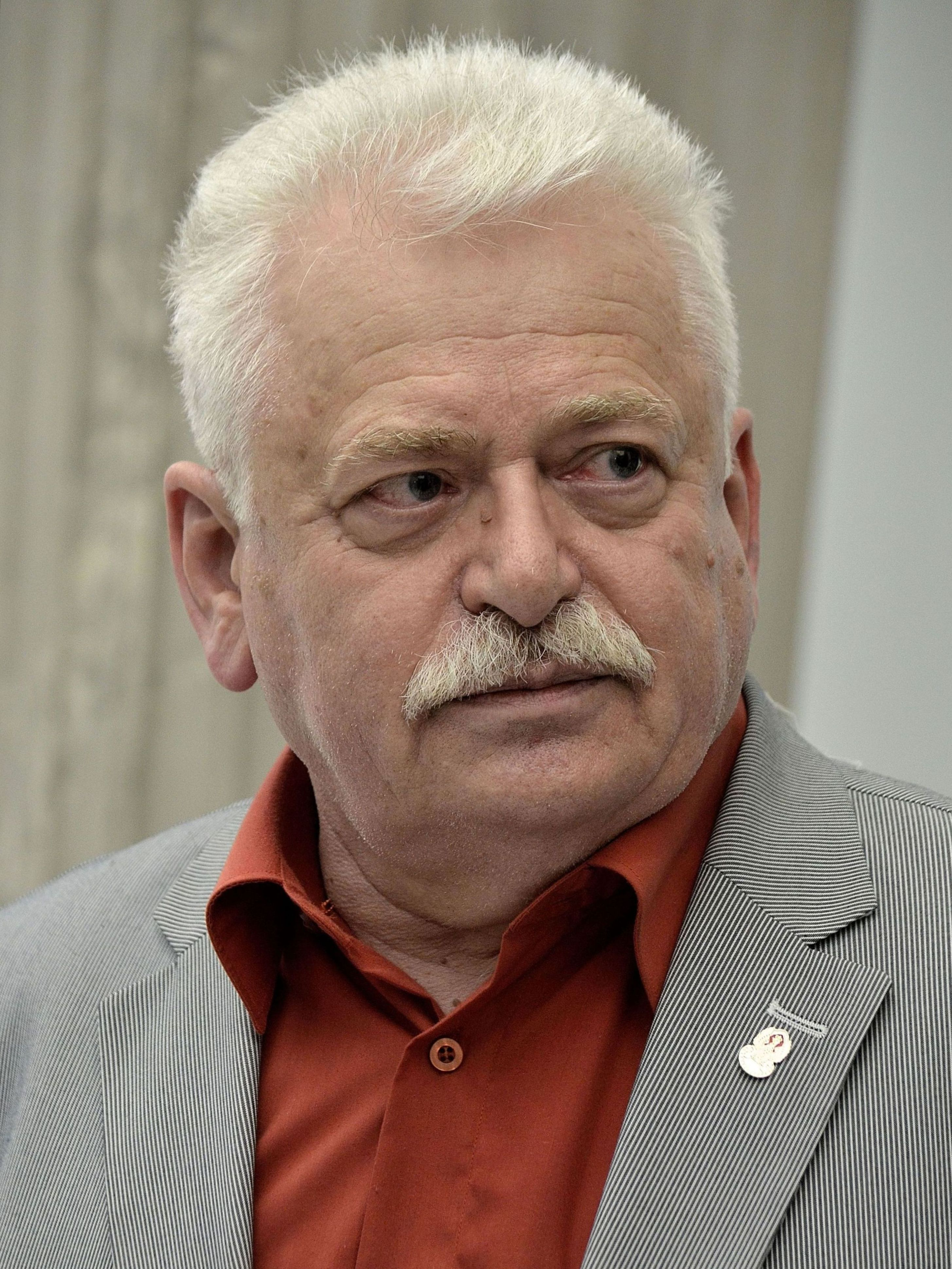

Minister of National Defence
- In office 23 May 1992 – 5 June 1992
- President: Lech Wałęsa
- Prime Minister: Jan Olszewski
- Preceded by: Jan Parys
- Succeeded by: Janusz Onyszkiewicz

Personal details
- Born: October 25, 1945 (age 80) Olmonty, Poland
- Party: Polish Independence Party (1985-1993)
- Other political affiliations: Confederation of Independent Poland (founding member), Movement for the Republic
- Parent(s): Mikołaj Szeremietiew, Irena Lubowicka
- Education: Wrocław University
- Occupation: Professor of Military Art, Columnist, Politician
- Awards: Order of the Polonia Restituta - Grand Cross Order of Polonia Restituta - Officer's Cross
- Website: https://www.salon24.pl/u/szeremietiew/

Romuald Szeremietiew (Polish pronunciation: [rɔˈmu.alt ʂɛrɛˈmjɛtjɛf]; born 25 October 1945) is a Polish politician, columnist, habilitated doctor of military sciences and associated professor at the Academy of National Defense and the War Studies Academy. He was a founding member of the Confederation of Independent Poland, an anti-communist, Sanationist independence movement. He became a member of the Sejm in 1997 and served as the Minister of National Defense in 1992 and Vice-minister in 1997.

== Life ==
=== Youth and family ===
Romuald Szeremietiew is the son of Mikołaj and Anna Szeremietiew (born Lubowicka). His father was of aristocratic descent, member of the Sheremetev family and an officer of the 1st Polish Army during World War II. He was arrested by the NKVD and brought to Moscow from where he did not return.

Romuald Szeremietiew graduated from Vocational School in Legnica and became a qualified worker. From 1965 to 1967 he served in the Polish Army and graduated non-commissioned officer school of army communication in Strzegom.

=== Education and Work ===
In 1972 he graduated from law studies from the University of Wrocław. He defended his doctorate on the basis of the thesis entitled Defense management of the Republic of Poland in 1995 at the Department of Strategic Defense at the National Defense University; He was awarded a postdoctoral degree (based on his academic achievements and the dissertation On the security of Poland in the 20th century) six years later at the same faculty. From the 90s he worked at the AON, he was also employed at the Krakowska Szkoła Wyższa im. Andrzej Frycz Modrzewski.

In October 2008 he became professor and head of the cadre of law of the Wydział Zamiejscowy Prawa i Nauk o Społeczeństwie KUL w Stalowej Woli. Next he took the position of associated professor at the War Studies Academy. He left the War Studies Academy in 2017, not wanting to work in an organization subordinate to Minister of National Defense, Antoni Maciarewicz, criticizing his lack of action as MOND.

=== Political activity ===
His first political activities were at students protests, which were cracked down upon by the MO. From 1966 to 1970 he was a member of the Alliance of Democrats. From 1973 to 1976 he was a member of Bolesław Piasecki's Stowarzyszenie "Pax" which had good relations with the government, but at the same time he was secretly part of the conspiratory, anti-communist Ruch Movement.

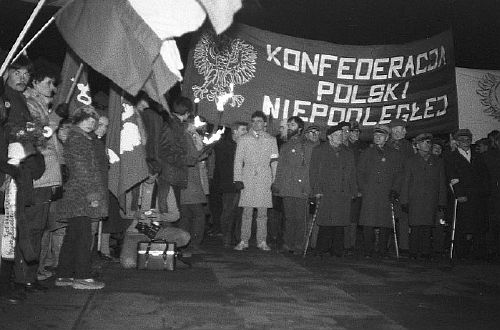
A protest of the Confederation of Independent Poland in 1981

In 1976 he was one of the founders of ROPCiO, the Movement of Defence of Human and Civil Rights, alongside Leszek Moczulski. After the fragmentation of the group due to internal fighting, Leszek Moczulski founded the Confederation of Independent Poland (KPN), of which Szeremietiew was a founding member and leading figure. Due to his pro-independence activities he was arrested by the communist government in 1981 but was released in 1984.

In 1985 he decided to leave the KPN after internal fights started to arise and he created his own Polish Independent Party – New Right.

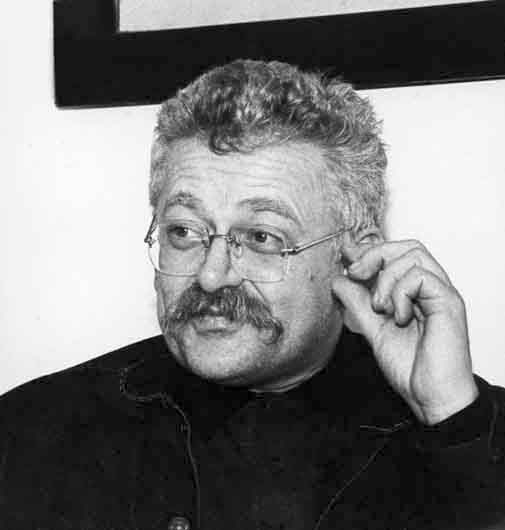
Romuald Szeremietiew during his time as Minister of Defense in 1992

In 1992 he was nominated Vice-minister of National Defense in the cabinet of Jan Olszewski. He took over the role of Minister of Defense after Jan Parys' resignation. During that time he was a co-founder of the Ruch dla Rzeczypospolitej, the "Movement for the Commonwealth" founded by the then-Premier Olszewski. In the same year Szeremietiew was elected leader of the party, which Olszewski did not accept. As a result the party fractured.

From 1997 to 2001 he was Member of Parliament in the Sejm under the Solidarity Electoral Action. Under the government of Jerzy Buzek he again served as Vice-minister of National Defense with the intention of creating the Territorial Defence Forces, but was dismissed from the government as a result of false allegations of corruption against him by two Polish journalists of the "Rzeczpospolita", Anna Marszałek and Bertold Kittel, which had a history of slandering politicians.

A court case was opened in 2005. On the 24th of October 2008 the court found him not guilty of the allegations of corruption and misusage of his post as Vice-Minister. In 2010 Szeremietiew was also found not guilty of the allegations of revealing state secrets. The slandering journalists never apologized to Szeremietiew.

In November 2014 he became head of the Buro of Defensive Initiatives of the National Defence University of Warsaw. He was appointed to that position by the Minister of National Defense Tomasz Siemoniak. He was also in the administration of the Foundation of Veterans of the Special Forces organization GROM.

In September 2015 he joined the Poland Together – United Right Party in Poland. In June 2021 he switched to the Republican Party of Poland.

== Selected publications ==
- Polityka jest sztuką możliwości, tom 1. i 2., Przedświt, Warszawa 1989.
- Czy mogliśmy przetrwać: Polska a Niemcy w latach 1918–1939, Bellona, Warszawa 1994, ISBN 83-11-08314-2.
- Wizja parlamentu w nowej konstytucji Rzeczypospolitej Polskiej, Wydawnictwo Sejmowe, Warszawa 1994, ISBN 83-7059-130-2.
- Strategia narodowego bezpieczeństwa, Bellona, Warszawa 2000, ISBN 83-11-09132-3.
- Siła złego... Niemcy-Polska-Rosja, Oficyna Wydawnicza Rytm, Warszawa 2015, ISBN 978-83-7399-657-1.

== Awards and decorations ==
- Great Cross of the Order of Polonia Restituta – 2017
- Knight's Cross of the Order of Polonia Restituta – 1990 (awarded by the President-in-Exile Ryszard Kaczorowski)
