= Lewczuk =

Lewczuk is a Polish surname. Notable people with the surname include:

- Henryk Lewczuk (1923–2009), Polish politician
- Igor Lewczuk (born 1985), Polish footballer
- Monika Lewczuk (born 1988), Polish singer, songwriter and model
