= Niemirówka, Poland =

Niemirówka
- Hamlet
- Location within Poland
- Coordinates: 50°42′N 23°40′E
- Country: Poland
- Voivodeship: Lublin
- County: Hrubieszów
- Gmina: Werbkowice
- Village: Honiatycze

Niemirówka [ŋjɛimirufka] is a rural hamlet in the village of Honiatycze, in Hrubieszów County, Lublin Voivodeship, in eastern Poland. It lies northeast of Tyszowce and Tomaszów Lubelski, as well as southeast of the regional capital of Lublin.

The locale's designation derives from the Slavic given name Niemir.
