= Attack on Hrubieszów =

1946 battle

Coordinates: 50°49′00″N 23°53′00″E

- Part of Anti-communist resistance in Poland (1944–1953) and Anti-Soviet resistance by UPA
Date	27 May 1946
Location	Hrubieszów, Lublin Voivodeship
Result	AK-UPA victory
Territorial changes	Temporary control of Hrubieszów

Belligerents
AK-WiN; Ukrainian Insurgent Army	Polish People's Republic; Soviet Union

Commanders and leaders
Kazimierz Witrylak; Henryk Lewczuk; Yevhen Shtendera	Unknown

Units involved
WiN; Ukrainian Insurgent Army	Citizens' Militia (MO); Polish Police; NKVD

Strength
150–200; 300	Unknown

Casualties and losses
1 killed 5 killed; 3 wounded	9 killed 9 killed

The attack on Hrubieszów was a joint action of the Polish post-Home Army (AK) organization Freedom and Independence (WiN) and the Ukrainian partisans of the Ukrainian Insurgent Army (UPA), which took place in Hrubieszów, Poland, on the night of 27 May 1946. It was the most significant joint action carried out by both organizations, which had previously often fought each other, but they decided to co-operate in the face of the common threat from the Polish communists and the Soviet NKVD.

== Background ==
Between 1943 and 1944, the Polish Home Army and the pro-Ukrainian independence Ukrainian Insurgent Army engaged each other in brutal fighting in the Lublin and Zamość region, while at the same time also fighting the Nazis and sometimes the Soviet partisans. After the entry of the Red Army into the area during Operation Bagration, the Soviet NKVD began persecuting members of both organisations (even though the Home Army attempted to cooperate with the Red Army in Operation Tempest) and the local civilian population. After the establishment in April 1944 of the Polish Committee of National Liberation (PKNW) (a communist provisional government sponsored by the Soviet Union under Joseph Stalin), the persecution intensified. As a result, faced with a common enemy which threatened to eliminate both anti-communist Poles and independence-minded Ukrainians, the two previous enemies took the first steps towards reconciliation.

As early as September 1944, the UPA commander in Eastern Galicia, Vasyl Sydor "Shelest", issued an order ending general anti-Polish actions in the region; from then on, UPA units were only allowed to attack those Poles who served with the Soviets (although it took several months for the orders to reach individual commanders in the field). On 3 May 1945, the local Polish AK-WiN issued a manifesto calling for an end to fighting between Poles and Ukrainians and for cooperation, printed it in 7,500 copies and distributed it in the surrounding villages. At the same time, the leadership of the UPA in the region made similar moves aimed at the same goal. After mediation by Catholic and Eastern Orthodox clergy, a meeting was arranged in Puszcza Solska (Solska Forest) between the commanders of both groups. The top commander on the Polish side was Marian Gołębiewski "Ster", commander of the Hrubieszów District, and on the Ukrainian side Yuriy Lopatynsky "Sheyk".

On 21 May, 1945, both sides concluded their first agreement. The two sides agreed to stop fighting each other, to have areas of influence, to come each other's aid in case of being attacked by communist forces, to put an end to mutual attacks on civilian targets, to share intelligence reports and to co-ordinate actions against communist agents and common bandit groups that plagued the area. According to some former soldiers of the unit, the agreement was partly due to pressure on the partisans that came from the local civilian population, which was sick of the fighting between both groups. The agreement covered the counties of Lubaczów, Tomaszów Lubelski, Hrubieszów, Biłgoraj, and Chełm.

In September 1945, the agreement was extended to include the Podlaskie and Chełm regions.

== Planning ==
In April 1946, the first joint action was carried out: an attack on the rail station in Werbkowice. In May 1946, a meeting took place in the village of Miętkie, between the Lublin region commanders of the two groups; the Poles were represented by Wacław Dąbrowski (Azja), the Ukrainians by Yevhen Shtendera (Pryrwa). An attack upon the town of Hrubieszów was proposed by the WiN soldiers and accepted by the UPA. The purpose of the attack was to free political prisoners from the local prison, to destroy documents held by the communist security forces, to destroy the headquarters of the Committee for Resettlement (which was in charge of deporting Ukrainians to the Soviet Union), and to destroy the precincts of the Polish secret police and the MO.

== Attack ==
The attack on the town began at 11 pm on the night of 27 May 1946. One of the main commanders on the Polish side was Henryk Lewczuk (Hammer), who later served as a delegate to the Polish Sejm from 2001 to 2005. Lewczuk led the best-armed Polish platoon in the attack, composed of 25 to 30 soldiers, all local volunteers (Lewczuk did not allow some of his soldiers from the Kresy region to participate in the attack, due to their deep-seated animosity to the UPA).

According to their plans, the partisans took control of the bridges and roads leading into Hrubieszów and then proceeded to the center, where their strategic objectives were located. There, as agreed, the UPA soldiers (around 300) assaulted the building of the Committee for Resettlement, while the Poles (around 150 soldiers) attacked the headquarters and prison of the communist secret police and the local office of the Polish Communist Party. The Resettlement Committee building, however, was heavily fortified and staffed with experienced and well-armed NKVD troops, and the UPA attack stalled. The Poles were more successful; by using mine throwers, they took the secret police building, freed about twenty prisoners and captured secret documents. After taking the party headquarters, they also executed two high-ranking communist officials.

At dawn, communist forces were supported by units of the Polish army stationed in the town. Regular army soldiers likely waited as long as they could before joining the fight, as WiN had infiltrated its ranks and run an extensive anti-communist information campaign.

Under attack by both the NKVD and regular army units, the UPA and the WiN soldiers began to withdraw. While firefights and skirmishes occurred during the withdrawal between the partisans and the NKVD, the Polish soldiers mostly confined themselves to just following the partisans in their vehicles, without engaging them in direct fighting.

One of the soldiers in the army units was Wojciech Jaruzelski, the future communist leader of Poland, who declared martial law in 1981. Jaruzelski's official website, in the "Diariusz" (Diary) section, states that from the fall of 1945 until 1946, Jaruzelski took part in "fighting bandits of the armed underground and Ukrainian nationalist" in order to "defend the Polishness of Hrubieszów Land".

During the fighting, one of WiN's freed prisoners was accidentally killed by friendly fire, and the commander of UPA was wounded. The Ukrainians lost two more men during the withdrawal. The Polish communists and Soviets lost from nine to fifteen men.

== Aftermath ==
In the end, the action was partly successful. Documents of the secret police were captured, though not those of the Resettlement Commission.

However, by the end of 1946, contacts between the two groups tapered off. The main initial reason was the negative attitude of the Polish underground's high command and of the Polish émigré government, the "Delegatura", towards close cooperation with the UPA. The high command ordered an end to further contact with the UPA, although local contacts continued until at least the end of 1946. One small UPA unit, led by Jan Niewiadomski (Jurka), kept up contacts with the Polish underground until 1948.

By the spring of 1947, however, most of the organised resistance, both Polish and Ukrainian, in the region had collapsed or significantly diminished. Most Ukrainian civilians had been deported and resettled to the Soviet Union or to other parts of Poland, and so the UPA lost its base of support. Many Polish partisans came out of the underground during the Amnesty of 1947 and were subsequently arrested and persecuted, despite previous promises to the contrary (the amnesty did not cover UPA soldiers). Still, some "cursed soldiers" held out in the forests as late as 1956.

== Bibliography ==
- Grzegorz Motyka; Rafał Wnuk (1997). Motyka G., Wnuk R. “Pany” i “rezuny”. Współpraca AK-WiN i UPA 1945-1947 (in Polish). Warsaw: Wydawnictwo: Oficyna Wydawnicza VOLUMEN. pp. 88–92. ISBN 83-86857-72-2.
