= Gołębiewski =

Golebiewski or Gołębiewski (feminine: Gołębiewska; plural: Gołębiewscy) is a Polish surname. It is sometimes spelled Golembiewski or Gołembiewski (feminine: Gołembiewska).

== People ==
- Daniel Gołębiewski (born 1987), Polish footballer
- Henryk Gołębiewski (politician) (born 1942), Polish politician
- Henryk Gołębiewski (actor) (born 1956), Polish actor
- Marek Gołębiewski (born 1980), Polish football manager
- Marian Gołębiewski (soldier) (1911–1996), Polish soldier and resistance fighter
- Marian Gołębiewski (born 1937), Polish archbishop

== See also ==
- Golebiowski, a related surname
