= Stanisław Dobrzański =

Polish politician (born 1949)

Minister of National Defence
- In office 5 January 1996 – 31 October 1997
- Prime Minister: Józef Oleksy and Włodzimierz Cimoszewicz
- Preceded by: Zbigniew Okoński
- Succeeded by: Janusz Onyszkiewicz

Personal details
- Born: 22 March 1949 (age 77) Hrubieszów, Poland
- Party: Polish People's Party
- Education: Maria Curie-Skłodowska University, Lublin
- Awards: Knight's Cross and Officer's Cross of the Order of Polonia Restituta

Stanisław Dobrzański (born March 22, 1949, in Hrubieszów) is a Polish politician and former Minister of National Defence of Poland, from January 5, 1996, to October 31, 1997. He was affiliated with the Polish People's Party.

== Curriculum vitae ==
Dobrzański was born in Hrubieszów. He graduated from the Faculty of Humanities of the Maria Curie-Skłodowska University in Lublin.

He began his professional career as a full-time employee of the Rural Youth Union. He was active in the United People's Party, where he served, among other functions, as a member of the party's main court. Between 1982 and 1985, he was the deputy director of the National Library in Warsaw. In 1985, he assumed the role of department director in the Ministry of Culture and Art. After the political changes in 1989, he managed the Warsaw branch of the Sugar Industry Bank and became involved with the Polish People's Party.

From 1993 to 1996, Dobrzański served as Undersecretary of State at the Chancellery of the Council of Ministers and as Secretary of the Defence Affairs Committee of the Council of Ministers. From January 5, 1996, to October 31, 1997, he was the Minister of National Defense in the governments of Józef Oleksy and Włodzimierz Cimoszewicz.

Between 2001 and 2006, he was the president of the management board of Polskie Sieci Elektroenergetyczne (Polish Power Grid Company).

In 1998 he was awarded the Order of Polonia Restituta, and in 2004 with the Officer's Cross of this order.

He received the Officer's Cross of the Order of Polonia Restituta Knight's Cross of the Order of Polonia Restituta.

== Bibliography ==
- Dobrzański do MON, „Gazeta Wyborcza” nr 4 z 5 stycznia 1996 (Dobrzański to the Ministry of National Defense), Gazeta Wyborcza No. 4 of January 5, 1996
