= Honiatycze-Kolonia =

- Village
- Location within Poland
- Coordinates: 50°42′7″N 23°38′16″E
- Country: Poland
- Voivodeship: Lublin
- County: Hrubieszów
- Gmina: Werbkowice

Honiatycze-Kolonia [xɔɲaˈtɨt͡ʂɛ kɔˈlɔɲa] is a village in the administrative district of Gmina Werbkowice, within Hrubieszów County, Lublin Voivodeship, in eastern Poland.
