= Ruch (organisation) =

Anti-communist organization

Ruch was an anti-communist organisation operating in Poland between 1965 and 1970. Its stated aim was the replacement of Poland's Marxist-Leninist-governed one-party state with a representative democracy. The group planned an arson attack on the Lenin Museum in Poronin. Its members were apprehended by the Polish authorities and imprisoned.

== Members ==
- Marian Gołębiewski (soldier)
- Andrzej Czuma
- Łukasz Czuma
- Stefan Niesiołowski
- Benedykt Czuma
