= Wilków, Hrubieszów County =

Wilków
- Village
- Location within Poland
- Coordinates: 50°46′15″N 23°45′55″E
- Country: Poland
- Voivodeship: Lublin
- County: Hrubieszów
- Gmina: Werbkowice

Wilków [ˈvilkuf] is a village in the administrative district of Gmina Werbkowice, within Hrubieszów County, Lublin Voivodeship, in eastern Poland.
