= Dobromierzyce =

- Village
- Location within Poland
- Coordinates: 50°46′N 23°41′E
- Country: Poland
- Voivodeship: Lublin
- County: Hrubieszów
- Gmina: Werbkowice
- Time zone: UTC+1 (CET)
  - Summer (DST): UTC+2 (CEST)

Dobromierzyce [dɔbrɔmjɛˈʐɨt͡sɛ] is a village in the administrative district of Gmina Werbkowice, within Hrubieszów County, Lublin Voivodeship, in eastern Poland.

== History ==
Five Polish citizens were murdered by Nazi Germany in the village during World War II.
