= Janusz Onyszkiewicz =

Polish politician and climber (born 1937

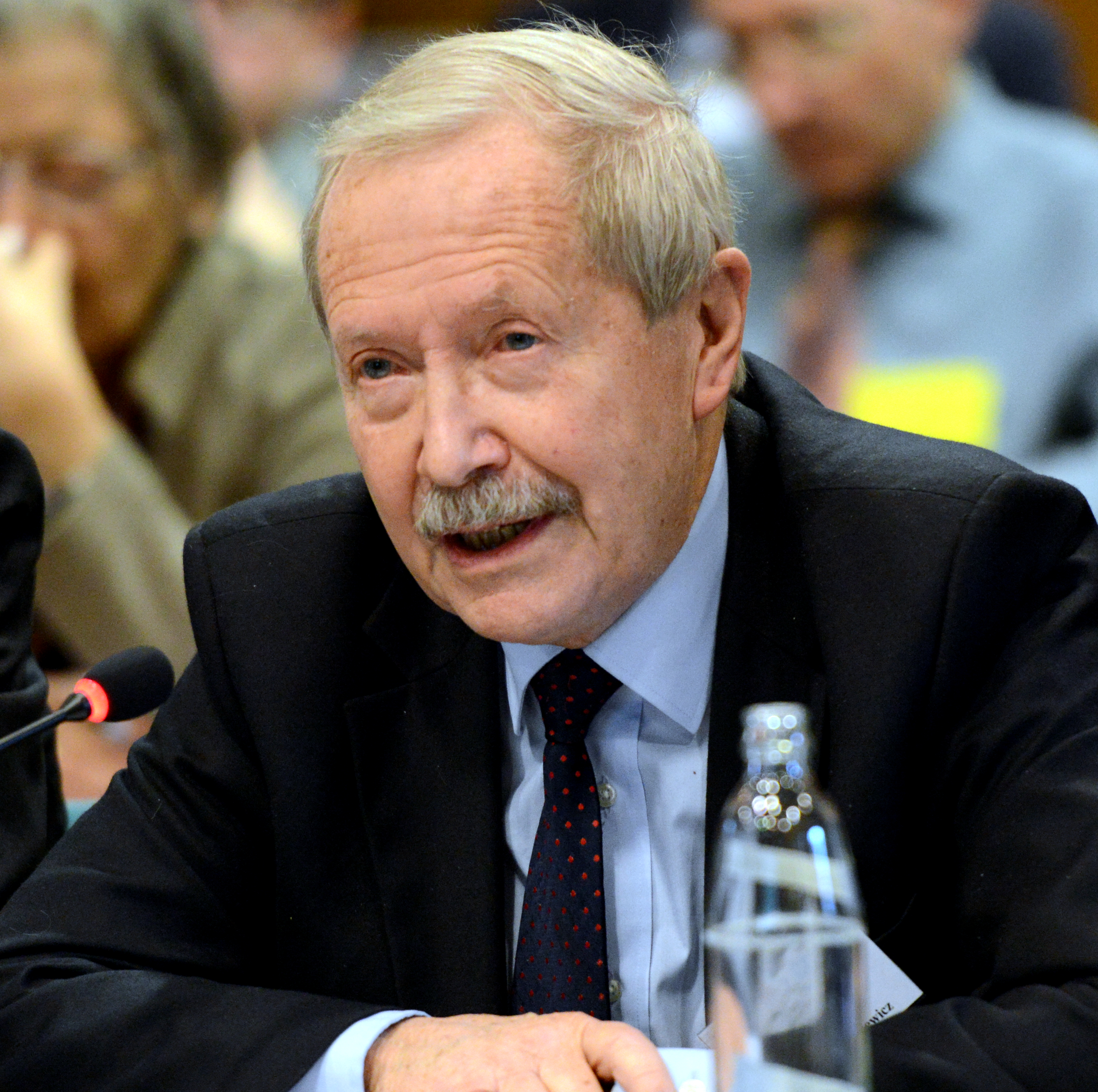

Minister of National Defence
- In office 31 October 1997 – 16 June 2000
- Prime Minister: Jerzy Buzek
- Preceded by: Stanisław Dobrzański
- Succeeded by: Bronisław Komorowski
- In office 11 July 1992 – 26 October 1993
- Prime Minister: Hanna Suchocka
- Preceded by: Romuald Szeremietiew
- Succeeded by: Piotr Kołodziejczyk

Personal details
- Born: 18 December 1937 (age 88) Lwów, Poland
- Party: Democratic Party – demokraci.pl
- Spouse: Alison Chadwick-Onyszkiewicz 1971–1978 (her death)

Janusz Adam Onyszkiewicz (Polish pronunciation: [ˈjanuʂ ɔnɨʂˈkʲɛvʲitʂ], born 18 December 1937) is a Polish mathematician, alpinist and politician, who served as Minister of Defence twice, in the cabinets of Hanna Suchocka (1992–1993) and Jerzy Buzek (1997–2000).

Later in his career, Onyszkiewicz was a Member of the European Parliament.

== Early life and education ==
Onyszkiewicz was born in Lwów (then Poland, now Lviv, Ukraine). He graduated in mathematics from Warsaw University. He became a mathematician, and was also known as an alpinist in the 1970s along with his wife Alison Chadwick-Onyszkiewicz. After Alison's death on Annapurna in 1978, Onyszkiewicz gave up altitude climbing and turned to politics.

== Political career ==
In the 1980s, Onyszkiewicz became the spokesman for the anti-communist Solidarity movement. He became popular among foreign journalists because of his fluent English. After the introduction of martial law in Poland on 13 December 1981, he was arrested and interned. In 1986, he was again detained by the police, preventing him from holding a news conference on behalf of political prisoners that was scheduled to coincide with the start of a conference of intellectuals.

=== Member of the Polish Parliament ===
After the fall of communism in 1989, Onyszkiewicz became a member of the Polish Sejm. He served all subsequent terms from May 1989 until 2001. In the spring of 1990, Onyszkiewicz and Bronisław Komorowski became the first civilian vice-ministers of defence in the communist-dominated Ministry of Defence. Later, Onyszkiewicz was Minister of Defence twice, in the cabinets of Hanna Suchocka (1992–1993) and Jerzy Buzek (1997–2000).

Initially, Onyszkiewicz was a member of the Obywatelski Klub Parlamentarny, then the Democratic Union and the Freedom Union. Today, he is a member of the Democratic Party, the continuation of Democratic Union.

In 1999, Onyszkiewicz was awarded the Manfred Wörner Medal by the German Minister of Defence.

=== Member of the European Parliament ===
On 13 June 2004, Onyszkiewicz was elected to the European Parliament as a candidate of Democratic Union in the 10th constituency (Lesser Poland+Swietokrzyskie Voivodeships) receiving 50 155 votes (6,37%). On 20 July 2004 he was elected a vice-president of the European Parliament.

== Other activities ==
Onyszkiewicz is Chairman of the ICDT's International Board of Directors.

== See also ==
- 2004 European Parliament election in Poland
