= Ministry of National Defence (Poland) =

Polish government ministry responsible for military and national defence affairs

- Ministerstwo Obrony Narodowej
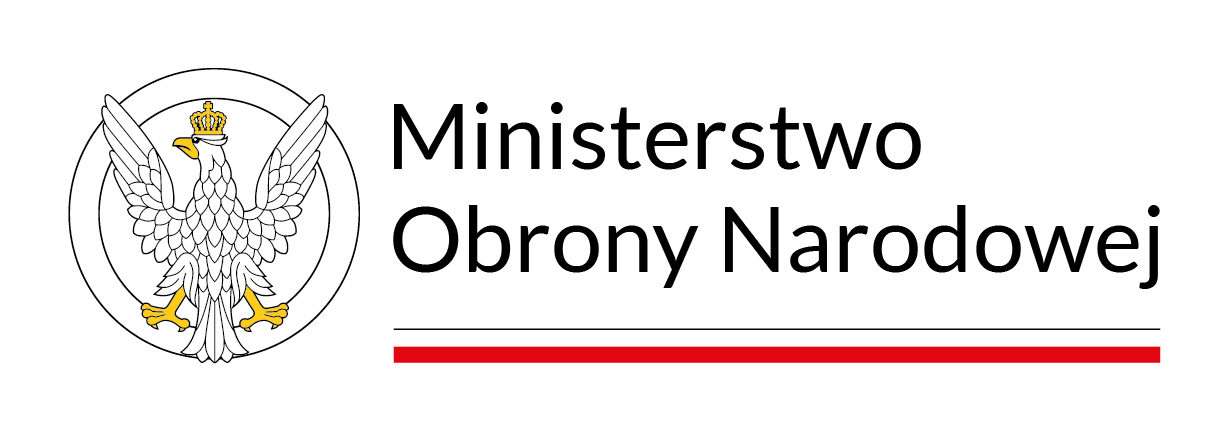

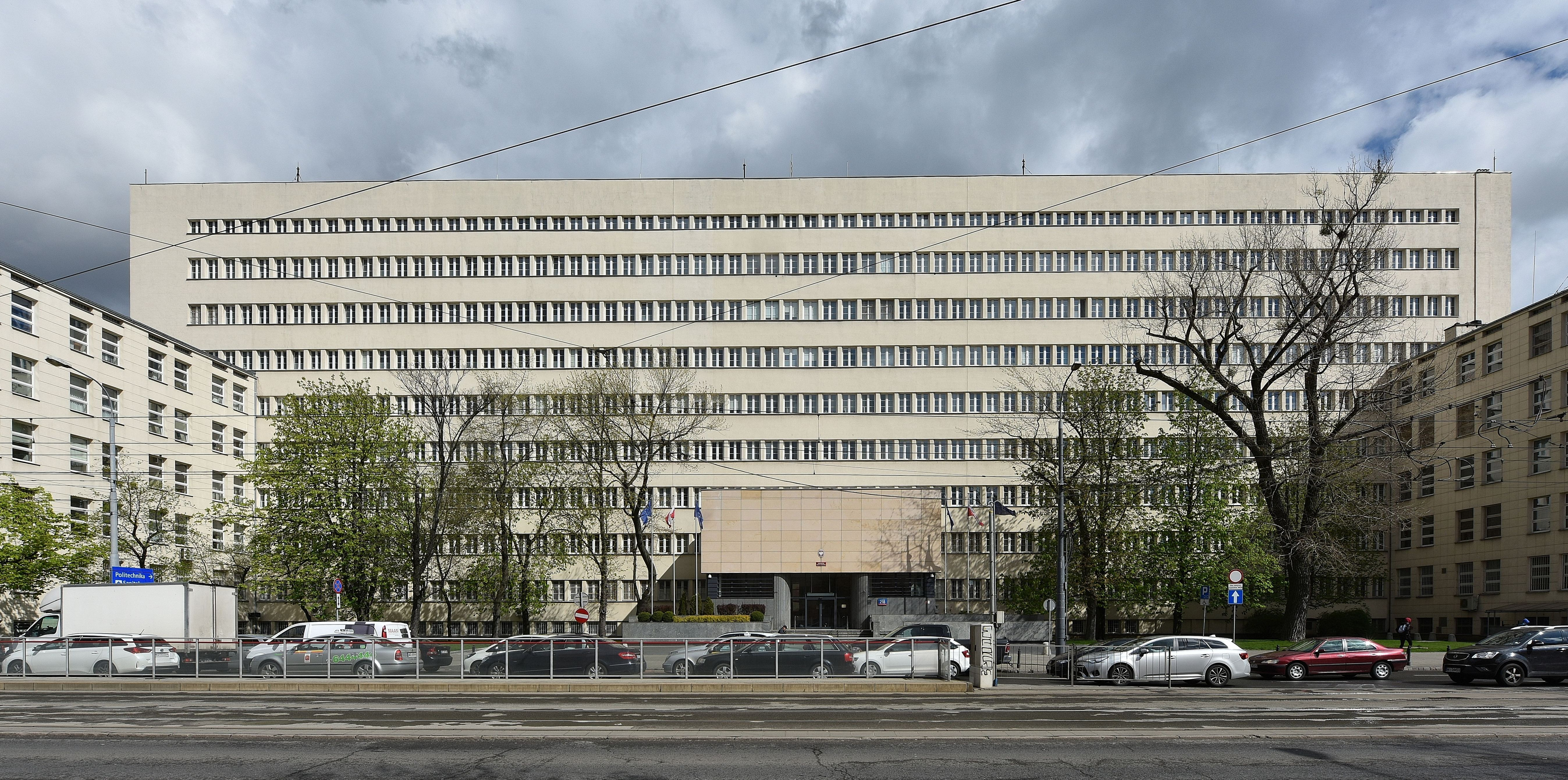
- Building of the Ministry of Defence on Niepodległości Avenue in Warsaw

Ministry overview
- Formed: November 30, 1942; 83 years ago
- Preceding Ministry: Ministry of Military Affairs
- Jurisdiction: Government of Poland
- Headquarters: ul. Klonowa 1, Warsaw; 52°12′44″N 21°1′33″E
- Annual budget: 140 billion zł (2022)
- Minister responsible: Władysław Kosiniak-Kamysz
- Website: www.gov.pl/web/national-defence

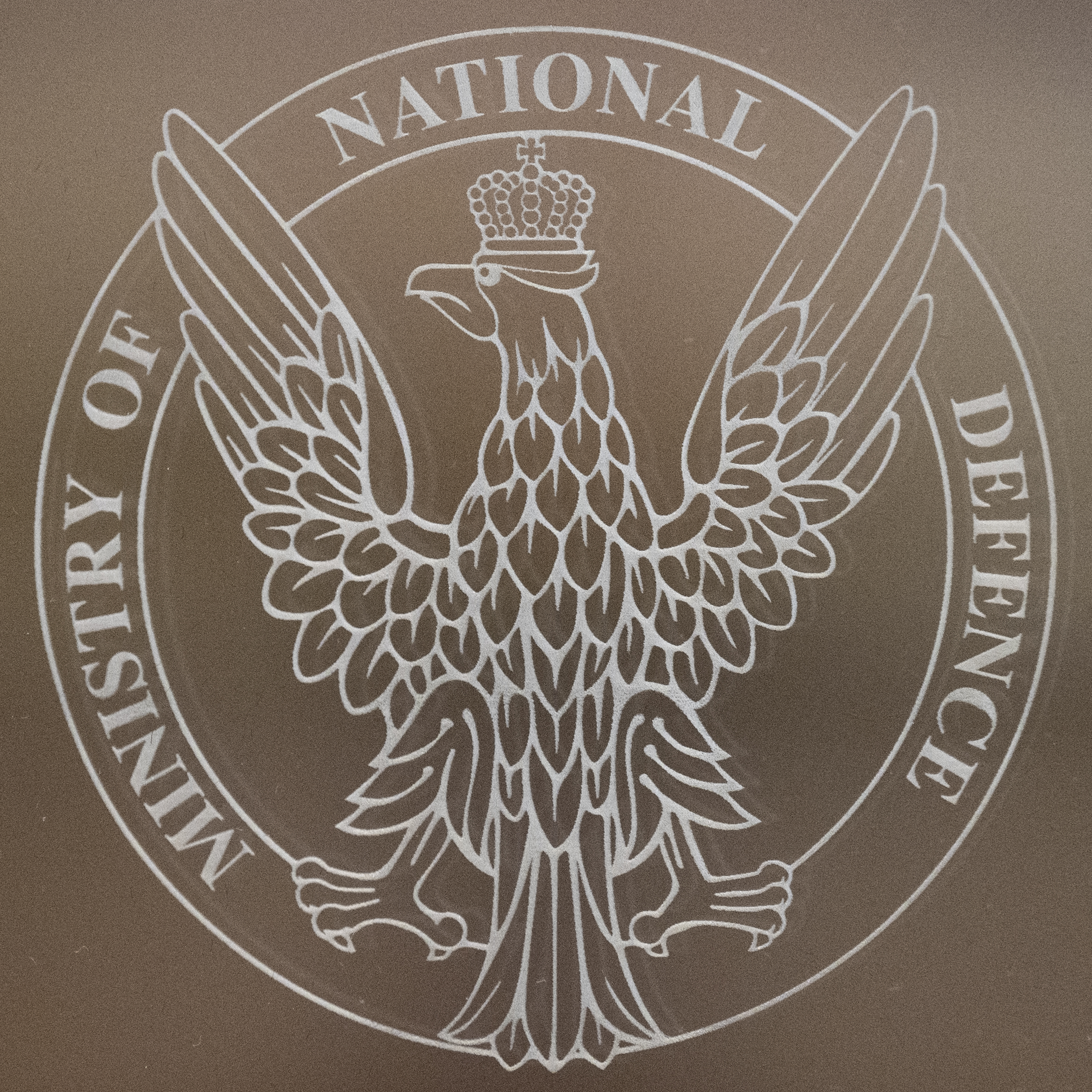
Logo of the Ministry of National Defence of Poland, from a gift presented by Polish Defence Minister Wladyslaw Kosiniak-Kamysz during his visit to Arlington National Cemetery, Arlington, Virginia on August 29, 2024

The Ministry of National Defence (Polish: Ministerstwo Obrony Narodowej [mi.ɲisˈtɛr.stfɔ ɔˈbrɔ.nɘ na.rɔˈdɔ.vɛj], MON [ˈmɔn]) is an office of government in Poland headed by the Minister of National Defence. It is responsible for the organisation and management of the Polish Armed Forces. During the Second Polish Republic and World War II it was called the Ministry of Military Affairs (Ministerstwo Spraw Wojskowych). Its budget for 2025 was 186,6 billion PLN.

== History ==
The beginning of the Ministry of Defence's operations is connected with the 1775 establishment of the Military Department within the Permanent Council. In 1789, the Military Commission of the Polish–Lithuanian Commonwealth was established, and from the Constitution of 3 May 1791 was under the Guardians of the Laws. Between 1793 and 1794, the department was restored in the Supreme National Council. When Warsaw became part of the Kingdom of Prussia after the Third Partition of Poland in 1795, the Prussian Ministry of War headquarters was moved into the local Copper-Roof Palace. Another War Ministry was established in the Duchy of Warsaw. After the establishment of the Stanisław Małachowski government on 5 October 1807, the War Directorate became the Minister of War.

From 1807 to 1810, the number of ministry officials increased from a dozen to over one hundred. The ministry's activities ceased on 4 May 1813. In 1814, the Military Organizing Committee was established in Paris to regulate the military affairs of the Kingdom of Poland in 1815. After the November Uprising and the introduction of the Organic Statute of the Kingdom of Poland in the early 1830s, the distinctiveness of the Polish defence establishment from the Ministry of War of the Russian Empire ceased to exist. On 30 January 1917, the Provisional Council of State created an acting military commission, which was to deal with Polish military matters until a war office was organised.

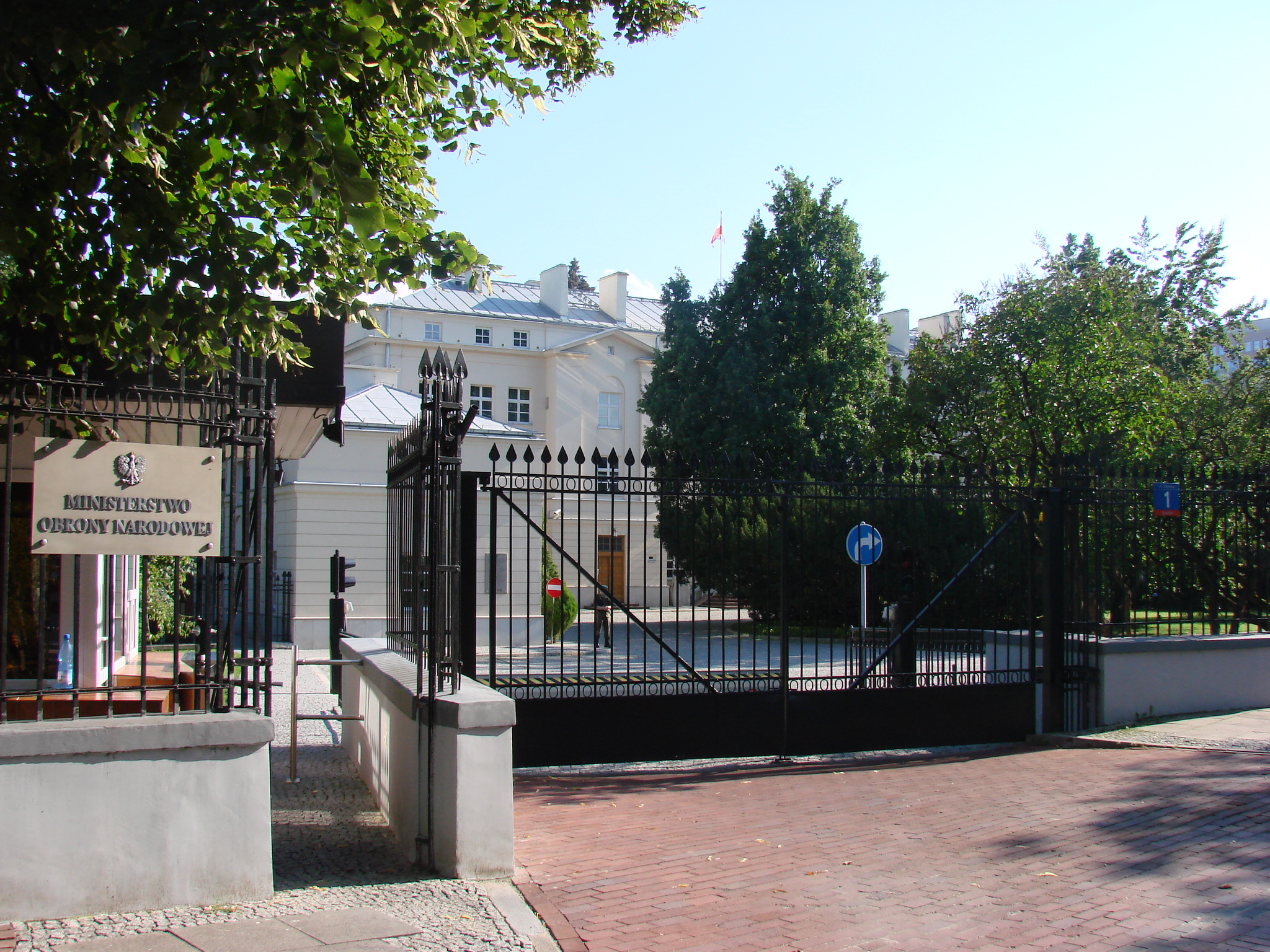
The main gate to the Ministry of National Defence complex on Klonowa Street.

On 2 November 1918, the commission was transformed into the Ministry of Military Affairs, based at the Copper-Roof Palace. During the London emigration of Polish power during World War II, on November 30, 1942, the name of the Ministry of Military Affairs was changed to the Ministry of National Defence. In 1944, under the Polish Committee of National Liberation under the communists controlled a National Defence Centre to manage the war front. After the war, the Provisional Government of National Unity (TRJN) reestablished the Military Affairs Ministry, which would be replaced by the Ministry of National Defence in 1979 and was under the Polish People's Army (LWP) in the People's Republic of Poland. The ministry would be transferred from the LWP to the Polish Army in 1990.

== Organizational structure ==
The ministry includes political departments, Cabinet of the Minister and the following organizational units including units P1-P8 forming Polish General Staff:

- Operational Centre
- Administrative Department
- Budget Department
- Department of Education, Culture and Heritage
- Department of Infrastructure
- Personnel Department
- Department of Control
- Department of Cyber Security
- Department of Protection of Classified Information
- Department of International Security Policy
- Armaments Policy Department
- Law Department
- Department of Social Affairs
- Department of Strategy and Defence Planning
- Department of Military Education
- Department of Military Health Service
- Department of Military Foreign Affairs
- Office of the General Director
- Office of the Minister of National Defence
- Offset Contracts Office
- Management Board of the Organization and Additions (P1)
- Management of Intelligence and Reconnaissance Intelligence (P2)
- Armed Forces Planning and Training Management Board (P3/P7)
- Logistics Management (P4)
- Management Board of Armed Forces Development Planning and Programming (P5)
- Management and Command Board (P6)
- Material Planning Board (P8)
- Military Information Services
  - Internal Military Service
- Military Intelligence Service

Units subordinate to the MON:

- Armed Forces General Command
- Operational Command
- Support Command
- Military Gendarmerie
- Territorial Defence Force
- Warsaw Garrison Command
- National Centre for Kryptologii
- Provincial Military Headquarters
- Centre of Monitoring and Analysis
- Inspectorate of Armaments
- Innovative Defence Technology
- Inspectorate of Military Fires
- Military Centre for Standardization, Quality and Codification
- Military Centre of Metrology
- National Military Representative to NATO
- Internal Audit for the Energy Sector
- Military Technical Supervision
- Military Studies of Teaching Foreign Languages
- Central Military-Medical Commission
- Military Pension Offices
- House of the Retired Military Personnel (Warsaw)
- Registration Office of the Polish Army

== Ministers ==
Second Polish Republic

- Brigadier general Edward Rydz-Śmigły (1918)
- (acting) Major general Jan Wroczyński (1918–1919)
- Major general Józef Leśniewski (1919–1920)
- Major general Kazimierz Sosnkowski (1921–1923)
- (acting) Major general Aleksander Osiński (1923)
- Lieutenant general Stanisław Szeptycki (1923)
- Major general Władysław Sikorski (1924–1925)
- Lieutenant general Lucjan Żeligowski (1925–1926)
- Major general Juliusz Tadeusz Tarnawa-Malczewski (1926)
- Marshal of Poland Józef Piłsudski (1926–1935)
- Major general Tadeusz Kasprzycki (1935–1939)

Polish government-in-exile

- Lieutenant general Władysław Sikorski (1939–1942)
- Major general Marian Kukiel (1942–1944)

Republic of Poland / People's Republic of Poland

- Marshal of Poland Michał Rola-Żymierski (1945–1949)
- Marshal of Poland/Marshal of the Soviet Union Konstantin Rokossovsky (1949–1956)
- Marshal of Poland Marian Spychalski (1956–1968)
- Army General Wojciech Jaruzelski (1968–1983)
- Army General Florian Siwicki (1983–1989)

Flag of the Polish Minister of National Defence

Third Polish Republic

Portrait	Name (Birth–Death)	Party	Term of Office		Prime Minister	(Cabinet)
	Army General Florian Siwicki (1925–2013)	Independent	12 September 1989	6 July 1990	Tadeusz Mazowiecki	Mazowiecki
	Vice Admiral Piotr Kołodziejczyk (1939–2019)	Independent	6 July 1990	4 January 1991	Tadeusz Mazowiecki	Mazowiecki
	Vice Admiral Piotr Kołodziejczyk (1939–2019)	Independent	4 January 1991	23 December 1991	Jan Krzysztof Bielecki	Bielecki
	Jan Parys (born 1950)	Independent	23 December 1991	23 May 1992	Jan Olszewski	Olszewski
	Romuald Szeremietiew (born 1945) acting	Independent	23 May 1992	5 June 1992	Jan Olszewski	Olszewski
	Janusz Onyszkiewicz (born 1937)	UD	11 July 1992	25 October 1993	Hanna Suchocka	Suchocka
	Piotr Kołodziejczyk (1939–2019)	Independent	26 October 1993	10 November 1994	Waldemar Pawlak	Pawlak II
	Jerzy Milewski (1935–1997) acting	Independent	10 November 1994	7 March 1995	Waldemar Pawlak	Pawlak II
	Zbigniew Okoński (born 1949)	Independent	7 March 1995	22 December 1995	Józef Oleksy	Oleksy
	Andrzej Karkoszka (born 1945) acting	Independent	22 December 1995	5 January 1996	Józef Oleksy	Oleksy
	Stanisław Dobrzański (born 1949)	PSL	5 January 1996	7 February 1996	Józef Oleksy	Oleksy
	Stanisław Dobrzański (born 1949)	PSL	7 February 1996	31 October 1997	Włodzimierz Cimoszewicz	Cimoszewicz
	Janusz Onyszkiewicz (born 1937)	UW	31 October 1997	16 June 2000	Jerzy Buzek	Buzek
	Bronisław Komorowski (born 1952)	SKL	16 June 2000	19 October 2001	Jerzy Buzek	Buzek
	Jerzy Szmajdziński (1952–2010)	SLD	19 October 2001	2 May 2004	Leszek Miller	Miller
	Jerzy Szmajdziński (1952–2010)	SLD	2 May 2004	11 June 2004	Marek Belka	Belka I
	Jerzy Szmajdziński (1952–2010)	SLD	11 June 2004	31 October 2005	Marek Belka	Belka II
	Radosław Sikorski (born 1963)	PiS	31 October 2005	14 July 2006	Kazimierz Marcinkiewicz	Marcinkiewicz
	Radosław Sikorski (born 1963)	PiS	14 July 2006	7 February 2007	Jarosław Kaczyński	Kaczyński
	Aleksander Szczygło (1963–2010)	PiS	7 February 2007	16 November 2007	Jarosław Kaczyński	Kaczyński
	Bogdan Klich (born 1960)	PO	16 November 2007	2 August 2011	Donald Tusk	Tusk I
	Tomasz Siemoniak (born 1967)	PO	2 August 2011	18 November 2011	Donald Tusk	Tusk I
	Tomasz Siemoniak (born 1967)	PO	18 November 2011	22 September 2014	Donald Tusk	Tusk II
	Tomasz Siemoniak (born 1967)	PO	22 September 2014	16 November 2015	Ewa Kopacz	Kopacz
	Antoni Macierewicz (born 1948)	PiS	16 November 2015	11 December 2017	Beata Szydło	Szydło
	Antoni Macierewicz (born 1948)	PiS	11 December 2017	9 January 2018	Mateusz Morawiecki	Morawiecki I
	Mariusz Błaszczak (born 1969)	PiS	9 January 2018	15 November 2019	Mateusz Morawiecki	Morawiecki I
	Mariusz Błaszczak (born 1969)	PiS	15 November 2019	27 November 2023	Mateusz Morawiecki	Morawiecki II
	Mariusz Błaszczak (born 1969)	PiS	27 November 2023	13 December 2023	Mateusz Morawiecki	Morawiecki III
	Władysław Kosiniak-Kamysz (born 1981)	PSL	13 December 2023	Incumbent	Donald Tusk	Tusk III

== See also ==
- Polish Armed Forces
- Ministries of Poland
- Wydawnictwo MON
