= Hostynne-Kolonia =

- Village
- Location within Poland
- Coordinates: 50°44′48″N 23°40′50″E
- Country: Poland
- Voivodeship: Lublin
- County: Hrubieszów
- Gmina: Werbkowice

Hostynne-Kolonia [xɔsˈtɨnnɛ kɔˈlɔɲa] is a village in the administrative district of Gmina Werbkowice, within Hrubieszów County, Lublin Voivodeship, in eastern Poland.
