= Alojzów, Hrubieszów County =

Alojzów
- Village
- Location within Poland
- Coordinates: 50°45′10″N 23°49′15″E
- Country: Poland
- Voivodeship: Lublin
- County: Hrubieszów
- Gmina: Werbkowice

Alojzów (Polish pronunciation: [aˈlɔjzuf]) is a village in the administrative district of Gmina Werbkowice, within Hrubieszów County, Lublin Voivodeship, in eastern Poland.
