= Jan Parys =

Polish politician (born 1950)

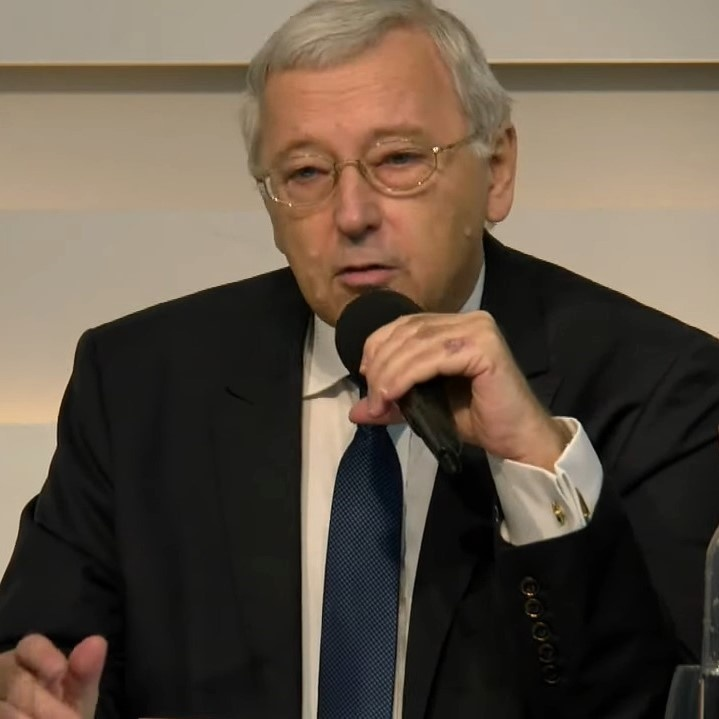

Minister of Defense
- In office 23 December 1991 – 23 May 1992
- Prime Minister: Jan Olszewski
- Preceded by: Piotr Kołodziejczyk
- Succeeded by: Romuald Szeremietiew

Personal details
- Born: 23 December 1950 Warsaw, Poland
- Party: Third Republic Movement (1992-1995)

Jan Stanisław Parys (born 23 December 1950 in Warsaw) was the minister of national defence for Poland from 1991 to 1992. He was the president of the Jagiellonian College, and is currently a board member at the Polish Institute of International Affairs. He holds a doctorate in sociology from the University of Warsaw.
