= Zagajnik, Lublin Voivodeship =

Zagajnik
- Village
- Location within Poland
- Coordinates: 50°40′06″N 23°48′53″E
- Country: Poland
- Voivodeship: Lublin
- County: Hrubieszów
- Gmina: Werbkowice
- Population (approx.): 60

Zagajnik [zaˈɡai̯nik] is a village in the administrative district of Gmina Werbkowice, within Hrubieszów County, Lublin Voivodeship, in eastern Poland.
