= Piotr Kołodziejczyk =

Polish vice-admiral (1939–2019)

Minister of National Defence
- In office 26 October 1993 – 10 November 1994
- Prime Minister: Waldemar Pawlak
- Preceded by: Janusz Onyszkiewicz
- Succeeded by: Zbigniew Okoński
- In office 6 July 1990 – 23 December 1991
- Prime Minister: Tadeusz Mazowiecki; Jan Krzysztof Bielecki; Jan Olszewski
- Preceded by: Florian Siwicki
- Succeeded by: Jan Parys

Personal details
- Born: 8 June 1939 Poznań, Poland)
- Died: 2 September 2019 (aged 80) Rekowo Górne, Poland
- Party: Polish United Workers' Party, Freedom Union

Military service
- Allegiance: Polish People's Republic; Poland
- Branch/service: Polish Navy
- Rank: Wiceadmirał (Rear admiral)
- Battles/wars: United Nations Disengagement Observer Force

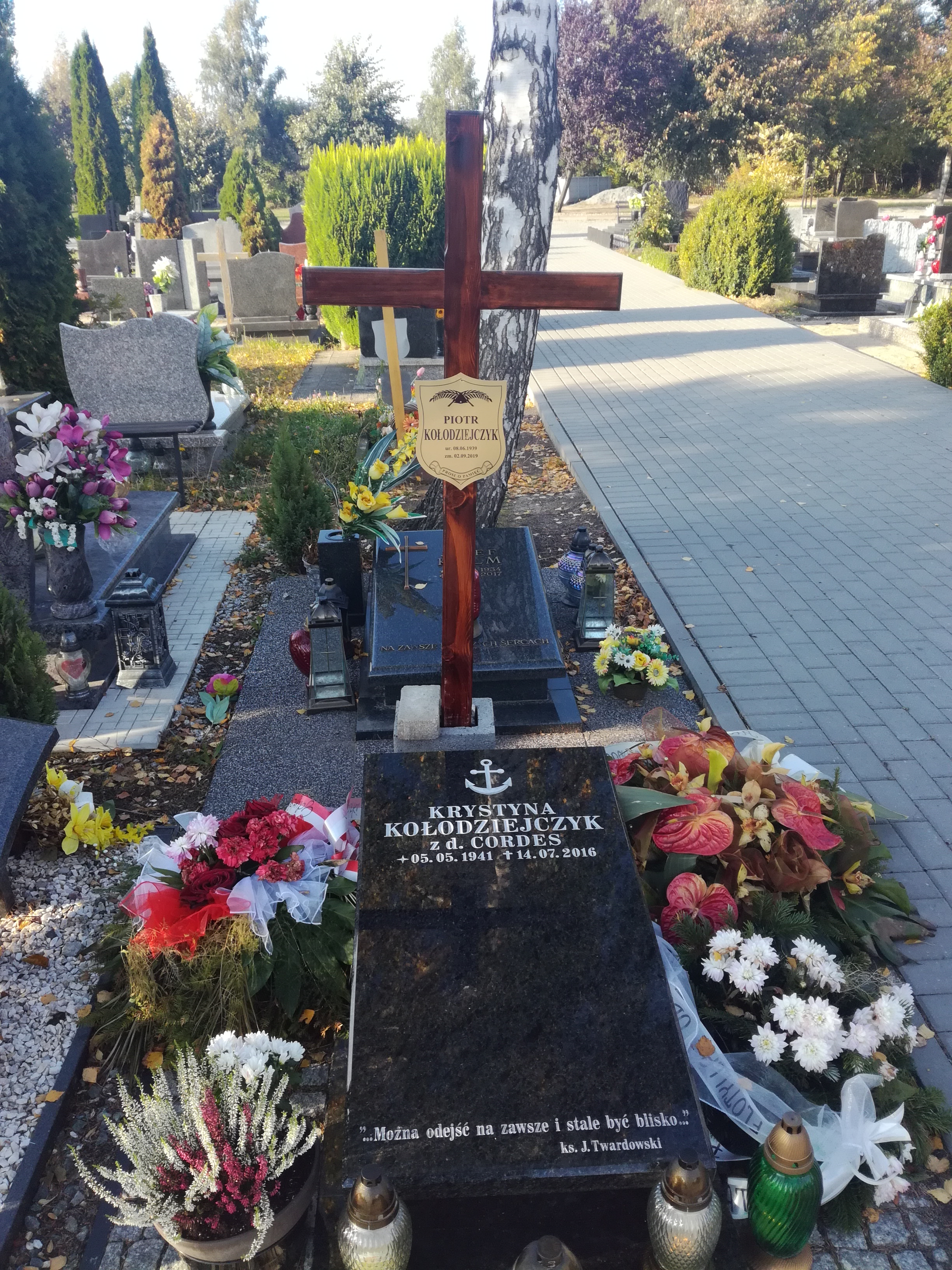
The grave of Piotr Kołodziejczyk at the Naval Cemetery in Gdynia (as of September 28, 2019)

Piotr Franciszek Kołodziejczyk (June 8, 1939, in Poznań–September 2, 2019, in Rekowo Górny) was a Polish vice-admiral, commander of the 3rd Flotilla of Ships and Navy, Minister of National Defence from 1990 to 1991 and from 1993 to 1994, and member of the Sejm of the 10th term.

== Biography ==
Son of Józef and Bronisława, he was born on June 8, 1939, in Poznań. (Note: Janusz Królikowski podał, że Piotr Kołodziejczyk urodził się w Goli. Oparł się na informacji podanej przez admirała i opublikowanej w tygodniku „Wybrzeże” w 1989).) On July 15, 1956, he began studies at the Deck Department of the Naval Academy in Gdynia. In 1960, after graduation, he was promoted to the rank of naval second lieutenant, received the professional title of marine navigator engineer and was assigned to the 3rd Torpedo Boat Brigade in Gdynia as assistant torpedo commander. He sailed successively in the crews of KT-83, KT-87 and as the commander of the ship on the KT-88. In 1962 he completed a one-year missile weapons course at the Baku Naval Academy After returning to the country, he was transferred to project 205 missile boats. He was the commander of the rocket and artillery department at ORP "Hel" and the deputy commander and commander of ORP "Elbląg". In 1970-1973 he was a student of the USSR's Kuznetsov Naval Academy in Leningrad. From 1973 to 1977 he served in the Naval Command in Gdynia as an assistant to the head of the department and deputy head of the Operations Department, and from 1976 was the head of the Reconnaissance Department. From 1977 to 1978 he commanded the Separated Group of the Polish Military Special Unit, United Nations Emergency Peace Force in the Golan Heights. In 1978 he was sent to study at the Academy of the General Staff of the Armed Forces of the USSR named after Kliment Voroshilov in Moscow. On September 5, 1980, after returning to Poland, he became the commander of the 3rd Ships Flotilla in Gdynia. On August 1, 1983, he became the chief of staff and the deputy commander of the Navy (Admiral Ludwik Janczyszyn ). In the years 1986–1989 he was the commander of the Navy. At the end of 1989, he assumed the position of the head of the Main Educational Board of the Polish Army. In 1984 he was appointed Rear Admiral, and in 1989 Vice Admiral.

From 1989–1991 he was a member of the Contract Sejm on behalf of the Polish United Workers' Party. After the dissolution of the PZPR, he was a member of the Military Deputies' Club.

From July 1990 to December 1991 he was the Minister of National Defence in the governments of Tadeusz Mazowiecki and Jan Krzysztof Bielecki. In 1992 he was to take the office of the Inspector General of the Armed Forces. After handing over the office to Jan Parys at the end of 1991, he was immediately transferred to the reserve against the will of President Lech Wałęsa, which made it impossible to assume this position. This situation was the beginning of a conflict between the president and the minister of defense (dismissed in mid-1992), and the General Inspectorate of the Armed Forces was not created. Piotr Kołodziejczyk was again the Minister of National Defense from October 1993 to November 1994 in the government of Waldemar Pawlak. He was dismissed after a prolonged conflict with President Lech Wałęsa and the Chief of the General Staff of the Polish Army, Tadeusz Wilecki. The culmination of this dispute was the so-called Drawsko dinner during the briefing of the commanding staff of the Polish Army in Drawsko Pomorskie, during which, in the presence of Lech Wałęsa and Tadeusz Wilecki, the generals criticized the activities of Kołodziejczyk, giving the president an excuse to dismiss him.

In the second half of the 1990s, he was associated with the Freedom Union, on behalf of which, in 1998, he unsuccessfully ran for the sejmik of the Pomeranian Voivodeship.

He died on September 2, 2019. He was buried on September 9 at the Naval Cemetery in Gdynia.

== Private life ==
He lived in Gdynia. He was married to Krystyna née Cordes, with whom he had two sons.

== Decorations ==
- Commander's Cross of the Order of Polonia Restituta
- Knight's Cross of the Order of Polonia Restituta
- Golden Cross of Merit
- Gold Medal of the Armed Forces in the Service of the Fatherland
- Silver Medal of the Armed Forces in the Service of the Fatherland
- Golden Medal of Merit for National Defence
- Silver Medal of Merit for National Defence
- Bronze Medal of Merit for National Defence
- UNDOF Medal for the deployment mission in the Golan Heights
- Order of the Red Star (USSR)

== Notes ==
Janusz Królikowski announced that Piotr Kołodziejczyk was born in Gola. He relied on the information given by the admiral and published in the weekly "Wybrzeże" in 1989.

== Bibliography ==
- Commander M.Sc. Ryszard Demczuk, Lt. Comdr. M.Sc. Bogusław Iwaniak, Lt. Comdr. Mirosław Jurkowlaniec, senior boatswain. Grzegorz Kamiński, Cdr. MSc. Jarosław Keplin, Lieutenant Comdr. Bogdan Kurel, Lieutenant Comdr. Wiesław Ładniak, lieutenant Piotr Pacek, lieutenant comdr. Andrzej Rejent, see Mar. Grzegorz Skwarek, Cdr. Dariusz Zakrzewski. Editorial Office of Naval Journals. Gdynia 2006. "Przegląd Morski". No. 3, March 2006. ISSN 0137-7205.
- Królikowski, Janusz (2004). Admirałowie Polskiej Marynarki Wojennej : 1945-2004 (in Polish). Toruń: Wydaw. Adam Marszałek. ISBN 83-7441-013-2. OCLC 69471820.
- Jędrzejko, Mariusz; Krogulski, Mariusz Lesław; Paszkowski, Marek (2002). Generałowie i admirałowie III Rzeczypospolitej : 1989-2002 [Generals and admirals of the Third Republic 1989–2002] (in Polish). Warszawa: Wydawn. von borowiecky. ISBN 83-87689-46-7. OCLC 51937075.
- Sejm side of a deputy of the 10th term of office. [accessed on 2019-09-03].
