= Peresołowice =

- Village
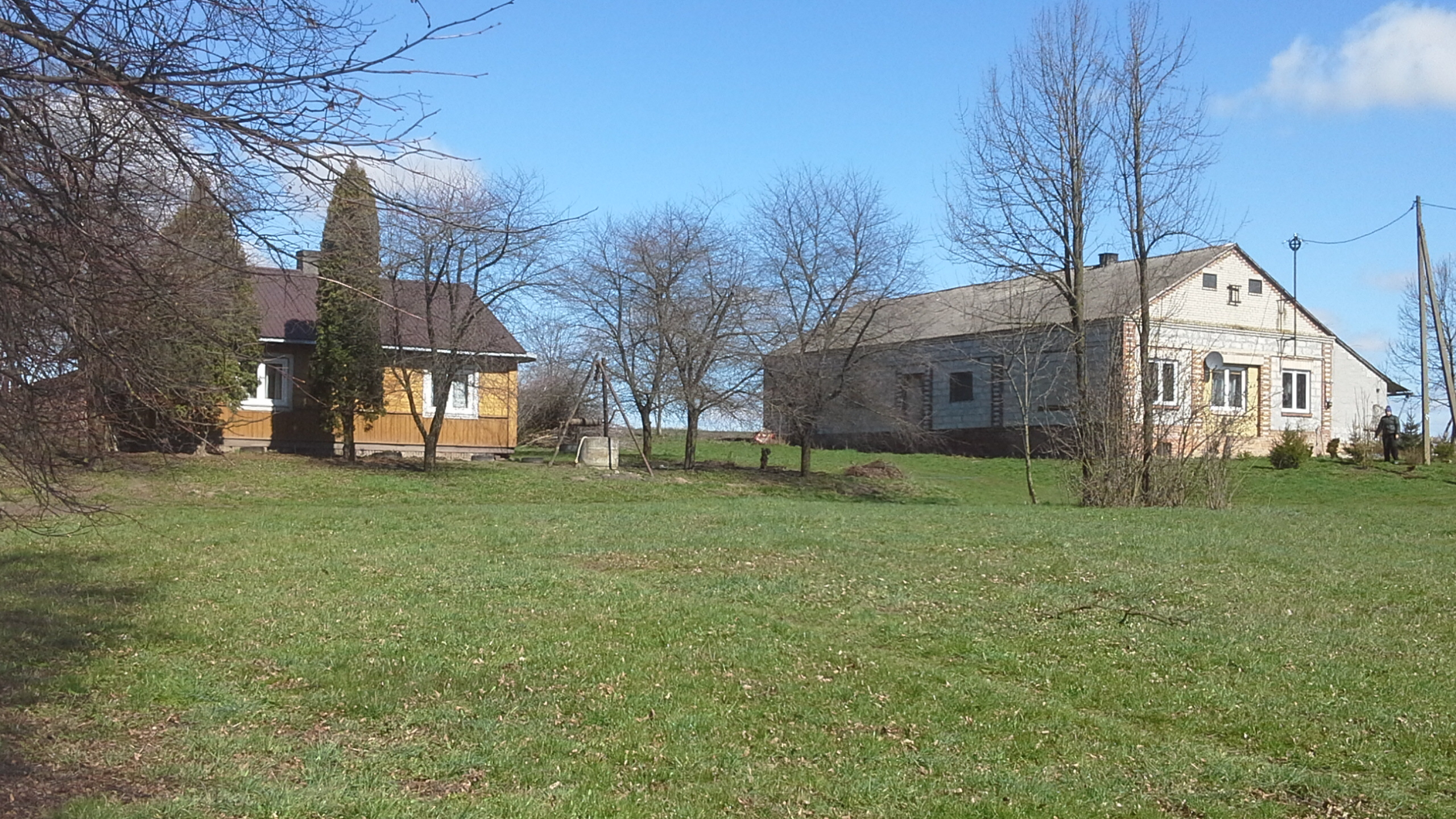

- Location within Poland
- Coordinates: 50°46′N 23°42′E
- Country: Poland
- Voivodeship: Lublin
- County: Hrubieszów
- Gmina: Werbkowice
- Time zone: UTC+1 (CET)
  - Summer (DST): UTC+2 (CEST)
- Vehicle registration: LHR

Peresołowice [pɛrɛsɔwɔˈvit͡sɛ] is a village in the administrative district of Gmina Werbkowice, within Hrubieszów County, Lublin Voivodeship, in eastern Poland.

== History ==
In 1827, the village had a population of 223.

Following the joint German-Soviet invasion of Poland, which started World War II in 1939, the village was occupied by Germany until 1944. In the summer of 1943, most of the villagers fled the village fearing a potential attack by Ukrainian nationalists. In the spring of 1944, the Ukrainian Insurgent Army (UPA) carried out the first attack in which they murdered a Polish couple aged 80 and 75. After the Soviet capture of the village, it was attacked by UPA once again on 25 October 1944. The UPA carried out a massacre of over eight Poles, including a one-year-old child, and injured further two children aged 6 and 2.
