= Podhorce, Hrubieszów County =

Podhorce
- Village
- Location within Poland
- Coordinates: 50°47′N 23°47′E
- Country: Poland
- Voivodeship: Lublin
- County: Hrubieszów
- Gmina: Werbkowice

Podhorce [pɔtˈxɔrt͡sɛ] is a village in the administrative district of Gmina Werbkowice, within Hrubieszów County, Lublin Voivodeship, in eastern Poland.
