= Honiatycze =

- Village
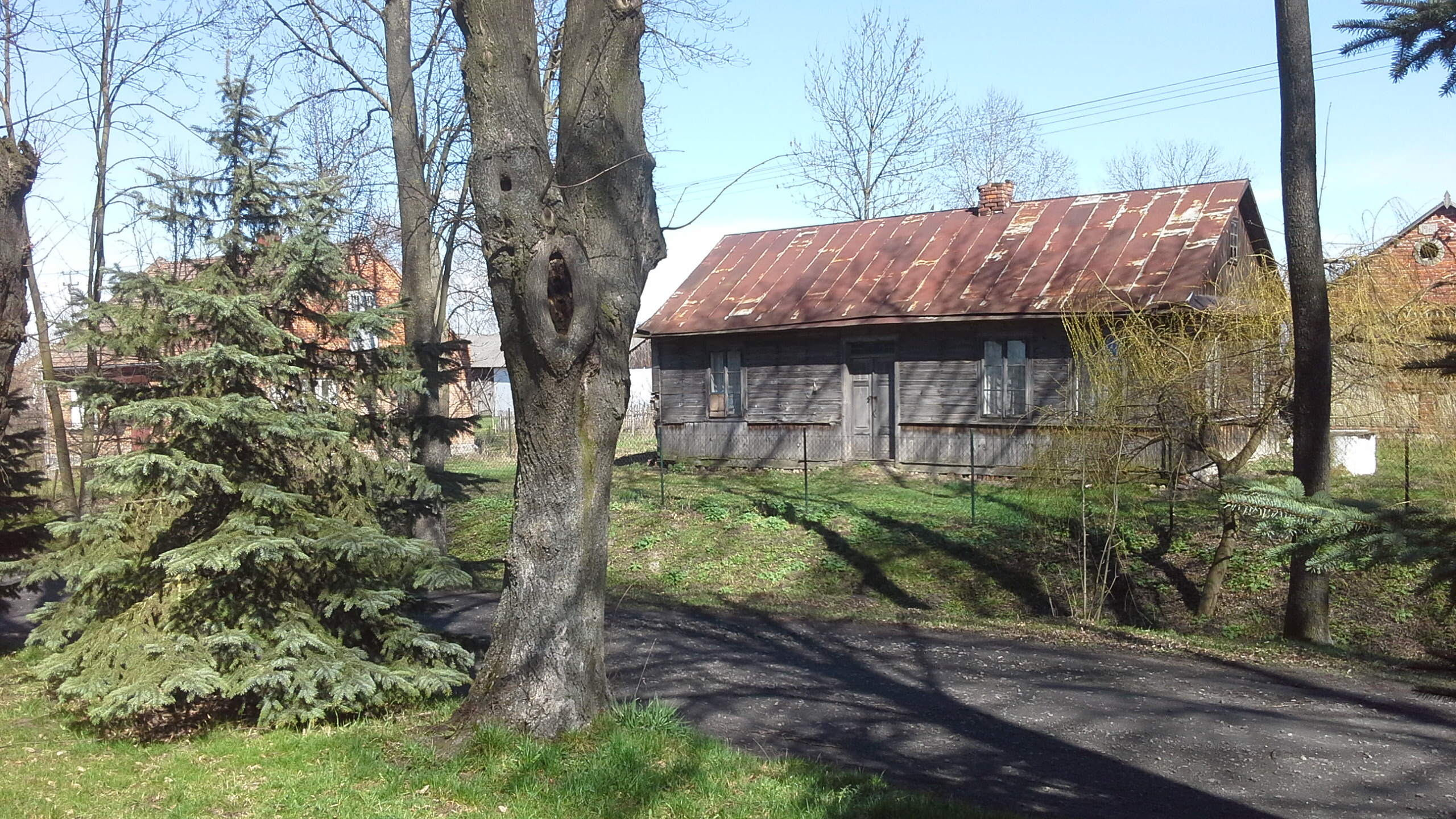

- Location within Poland
- Coordinates: 50°42′N 23°40′E
- Country: Poland
- Voivodeship: Lublin
- County: Hrubieszów
- Gmina: Werbkowice

Honiatycze [xɔɲaˈtɨt͡ʂɛ] is a village in the administrative district of Gmina Werbkowice, within Hrubieszów County, Lublin Voivodeship, in eastern Poland.

The village is divided into a number of hamlets: Darmocha, Karczunek, Niemirówka, Wygon, and Zagrobla.
