= Sahryń-Kolonia =

- Village
- Location within Poland
- Coordinates: 50°40′33″N 23°46′35″E
- Country: Poland
- Voivodeship: Lublin
- County: Hrubieszów
- Gmina: Werbkowice

Sahryń-Kolonia [ˈsaxrɨɲ kɔˈlɔɲa] is a village in the administrative district of Gmina Werbkowice, within Hrubieszów County, Lublin Voivodeship, in eastern Poland.
