= Malice, Lublin Voivodeship =

Malice
- Village
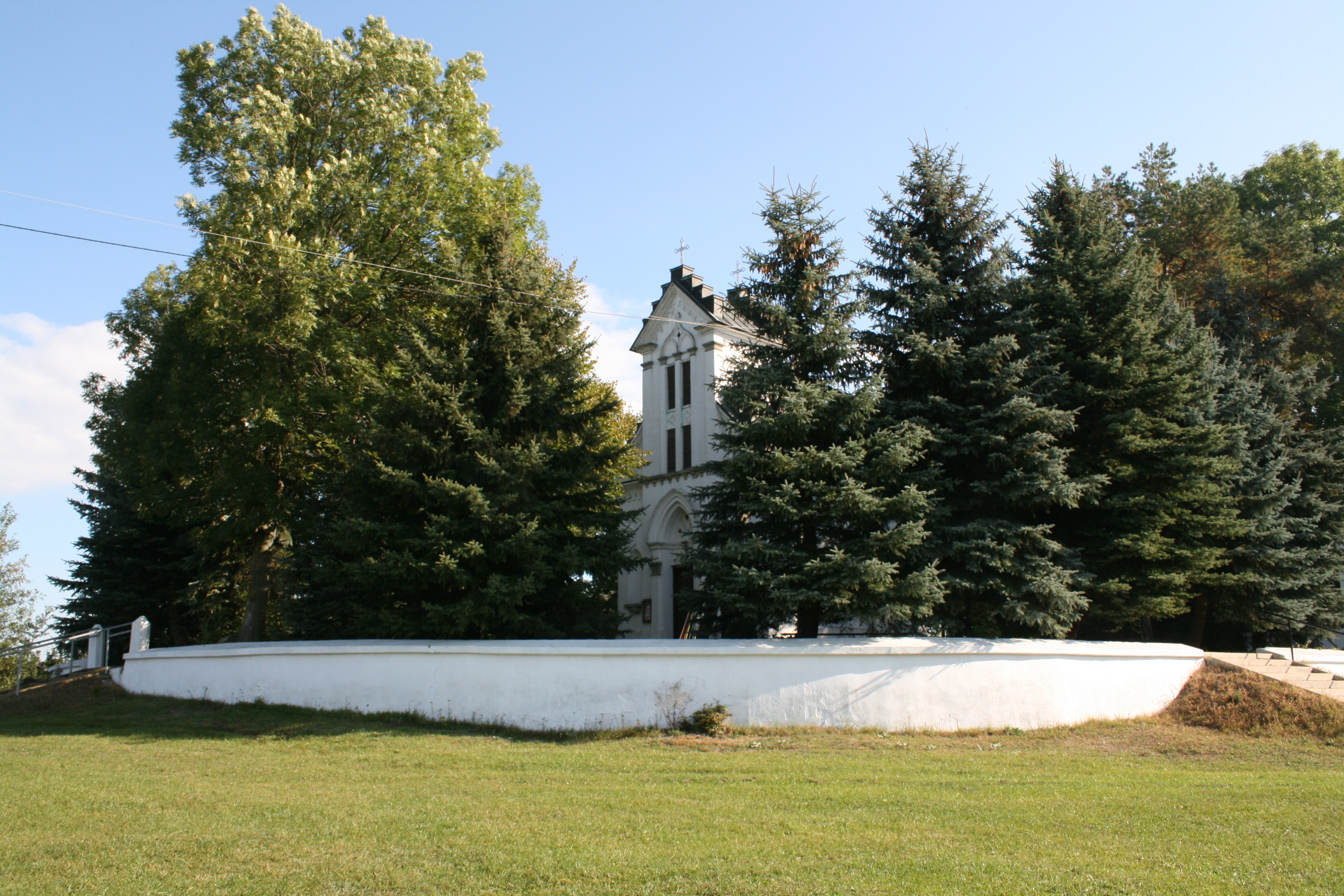
- Holy Cross church in Malice

- Location within Poland
- Coordinates: 50°42′43″N 23°45′4″E
- Country: Poland
- Voivodeship: Lublin
- County: Hrubieszów
- Gmina: Werbkowice
- Time zone: UTC+1 (CET)
  - Summer (DST): UTC+2 (CEST)
- Vehicle registration: LHR

Malice [maˈlit͡sɛ] is a village in the administrative district of Gmina Werbkowice, within Hrubieszów County, Lublin Voivodeship, in eastern Poland.
