= Marian Gołębiewski (soldier) =

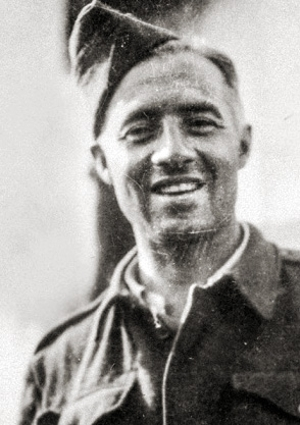
Marian Gołębiewski

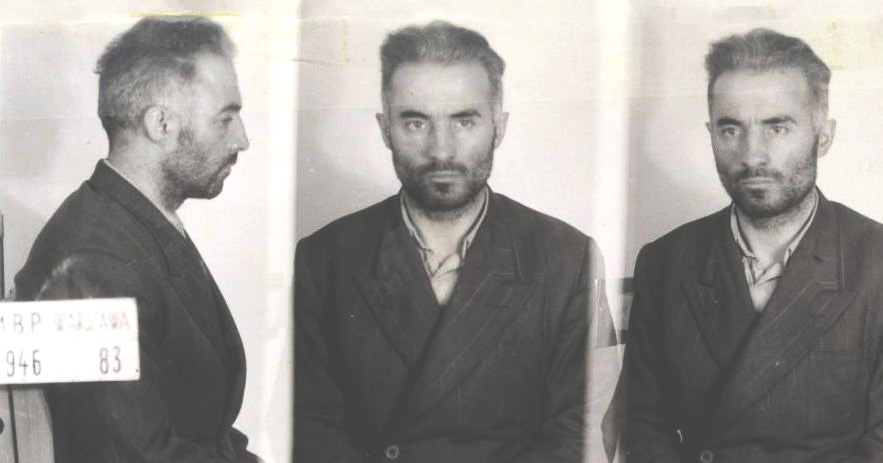
Marian Gołębiewski after arrest by MBP (communist Ministry of Public Security) 1946

Marian Gołębiewski (noms de guerre "Irka", "Korab", "Lotka", "Ster", "Swoboda"), a soldier of the Home Army and the anti-Communist organization Wolność i Niezawisłość was born on 16 April 1911 in Płońsk, Poland.

== Family and early life ==
His father was a shoemaker, and in 1922 the family moved to Inowrocław. Gołębiewski, who graduated from a teachers' college, took up several jobs. He worked for Sport Club Goplana Inowrocław, as a reporter of the Dziennik Kujawski daily and as a clerk. Finally, in March 1939 he moved to Kołomyja, where began working as a teacher in local elementary school.

== World War Two ==
=== In the West ===
During the Polish September Campaign Gołębiewski volunteered to the 45th Infantry Regiment of the Polish Army. On 19 September 1939, together with a group of soldiers, he crossed the Polish-Romanian border and was interned. Two months later he found himself in France, where he graduated from a military school in the Polish camp at Coetquidan. After a promotion to chorąży, he joined the 1st Grenadiers Division (Poland).

During German invasion of France, Gołębiewski, then already a sergeant, fought in Alsace and Lorraine. On 21 June 1940 he was captured by the Germans and was sent to a POW camp in Sarreguemines, from where he escaped on the night of 4-5 October 1940. Across France, Spain and Gibraltar Gołębiewski reached England on 13 July 1941. Soon afterwards he began a Cichociemni training.

=== In Poland ===
Gołębiewski was flown to Poland on 2 October 1942 and dropped by parachute in the area of Dęblin. In mid-November, he moved to Zamość, where he later took over the post of commandant of the Kedyw directorate. Between late 1942 and early 1943 German occupiers were forcibly displacing Poles from the area and the Home Army units carried out several attacks on German posts and units. In April 1943 Gołębiewski distinguished himself, when he freed Alicja Szczepankiewiczowa, the wife of the Commandant of Tomaszów Lubelski Home Army District, together with their 9-year-old son.

In October 1943 he became commandant of the Hrubieszów District. Gołębiewski favoured the offense against Ukrainian units of UPA, active in the area, and skirmishes between Poles and Ukrainians lasted there until June 1944. Meanwhile, Gołębiewski became commandant of the Włodzimierz Wołyński District, where he helped soldiers of the 27th Polish Home Army Infantry Division cross the Bug River. Wounded twice, he managed to get out of German encirclement in June 1944.

== After 1945 ==
After the Red Army advanced into the District of Lublin, Gołębiewski continued the struggle, this time against the Communists. On 19 August 1944, in a joint action with the Ukrainian Insurgent Army (against whom Gołębiewski previously fought) his unit took over a Soviet prison in Hrubieszów, freeing Home Army soldiers kept there. Also, his men robbed a local savings bank, as they were in desperate need of money. Gołębiewski, who was known for his anti-Communist stance, cooperated with Narodowe Siły Zbrojne and with the Ukrainians. His attitude towards them changed drastically, former enemies became allies because of mutual threat from the Soviets. However, his cooperation with UPA was not favored by Jan Mazurkiewicz, commandant of Delegatura Sił Zbrojnych na Kraj, who banned further talks with the Ukrainian side.

=== Imprisonments ===
Gołębiewski was very active in the anti-Communist struggle, where he co-authored the project of an attack on the infamous Mokotów Prison, which was never carried out. On 21 January 1946 he was arrested and interrogated, during which time he was tortured by Adam Humer, and was sentenced to death. The sentence was in February 1947 and changed to life in prison by the President Bolesław Bierut.

Shuttled across Poland from one prison to another, Gołębiewski tried to escape from a prison in Sieradz on 3 December 1955, but failed. Finally, due to an amnesty, he was released on 21 June 1956. Still an anti-Communist, he was active in various organizations, and on 21 June 1970 was arrested again, together with other members of the Ruch Movement (such as Stefan Niesiolowski and Andrzej Czuma), who were planning to set fire to a Vladimir Lenin museum in Poronin. Released in August 1974, he joined the Movement for Defense of Human and Civic Rights and later, Solidarity.

In May 1982 Gołębiewski left for the United States, where he worked in Polish community newspapers. He returned to Poland in 1990. His 1970 sentence was officially voided in June 1996, Gołębiewski died a few months later, on 18 October 1996. He was buried at the Powązki Cemetery in Warsaw.

== See also ==
- Cursed soldiers
- 1951 Mokotów Prison execution

== Sources ==
- Piotr Byszewski, Marian Gołębiewski, [w:] Opozycja w PRL. Słownik biograficzny, t. 1, red. Jan Skórzyński, Paweł Sowiński, Małgorzata Strasz, Warszawa 2000.
- Andrzej Izdebski, Kapitan Gołębiewski żołnierz Międzymorza, Kraków 1993.
- Mariusz Zajączkowski, Marian Gołębiewski, [w:] Konspiracja i opór społeczny w Polsce 1944-1956, t. II, Kraków 2004.
- Konstanty Hanff, Rewizja historii, tom I, Poznań 1997.
- Kamiński Ł., Ostatnia akcja płk. Mariana Gołębiewskiego, "Studia Rzeszowskie", t. VII, Rzeszów 2000.
- Stefan Niesiołowski, Ruch w więzieniu, Tygodnik "Wprost", Nr 867, (11 lipca 1999 r.).
