= Łysa Góra, Hrubieszów County =

Łysa Góra
- Village
- Location within Poland
- Coordinates: 50°44′N 23°46′E
- Country: Poland
- Voivodeship: Lublin
- County: Hrubieszów
- Gmina: Werbkowice

Łysa Góra [ˈwɨsa ˈɡura] is a village in the administrative district of Gmina Werbkowice, within Hrubieszów County, Lublin Voivodeship, in eastern Poland.
