= Golebiowski =

Golebiowski or Gołębiowski (pronounced [ɡɔwɛmˈbjɔfskʲi]; feminine: Gołębiowska; plural: Gołębiowscy) is a Polish surname. It is sometimes spelled Golembiowski or Gołembiowski. Notable people with the surname include:

- Kelly Golebiowski (born 1981), Australian footballer
- Łukasz Gołębiowski (1773–1849), Polish ethnographer and historian
- Piotr Gołębiowski (1902–1980), Polish Roman Catholic prelate
- Radosław Gołębiowski (born 2001), Polish footballer
- Dariusz Gołębiowski (born 1991), Polish baseball player

== See also ==
- Golebiewski, a related surname
