= Gozdów, Lublin Voivodeship =

Gozdów
- Village
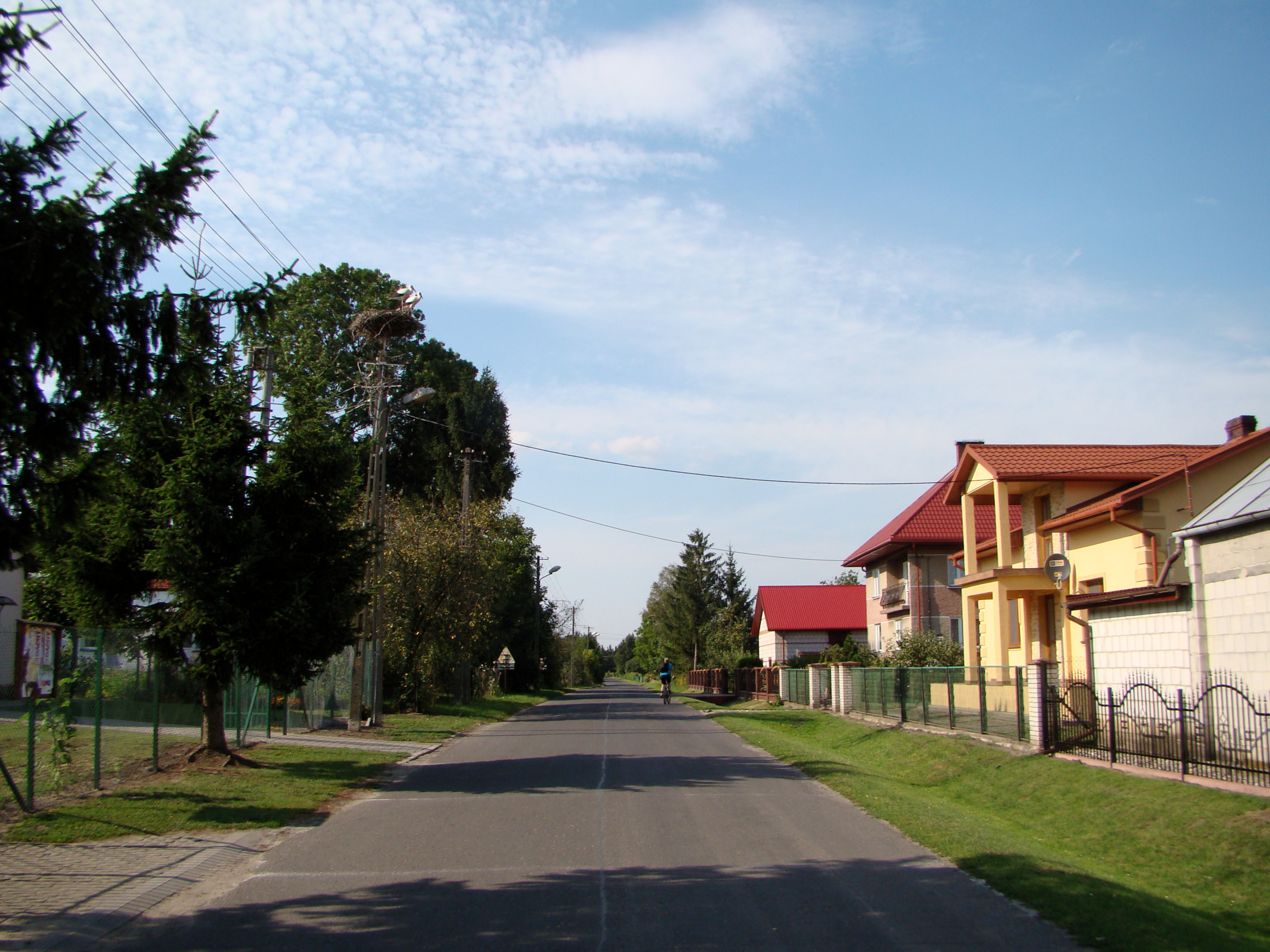
- Road through Gozdów

- Location within Poland
- Coordinates: 50°46′19″N 23°48′39″E
- Country: Poland
- Voivodeship: Lublin
- County: Hrubieszów
- Gmina: Werbkowice
- Population: 816

Gozdów [ˈɡɔzduf] is a village in the administrative district of Gmina Werbkowice, within Hrubieszów County, Lublin Voivodeship, in eastern Poland.

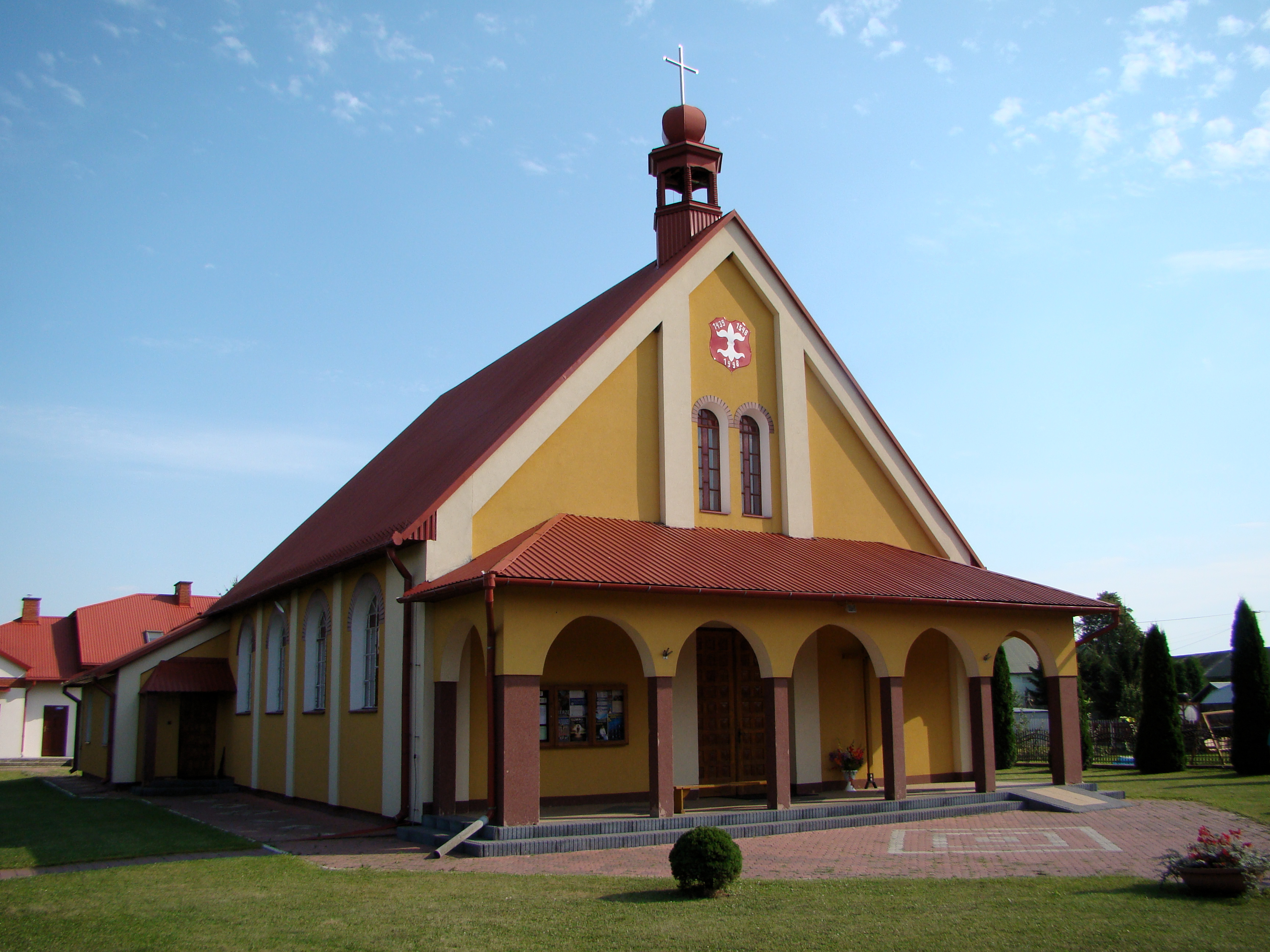
Divine Mercy church in Gozdów

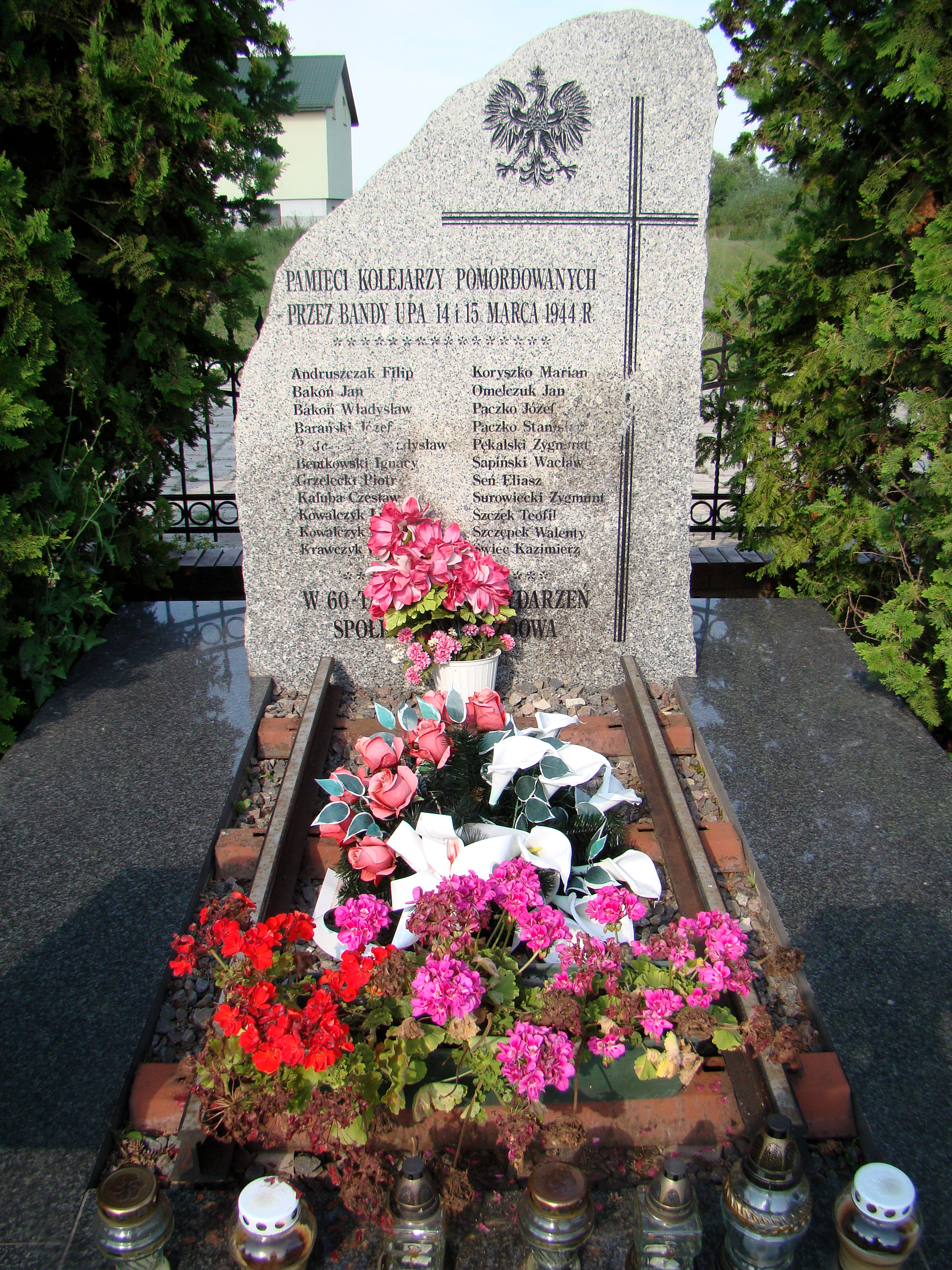
Memorial of railwaymen killed by UPA

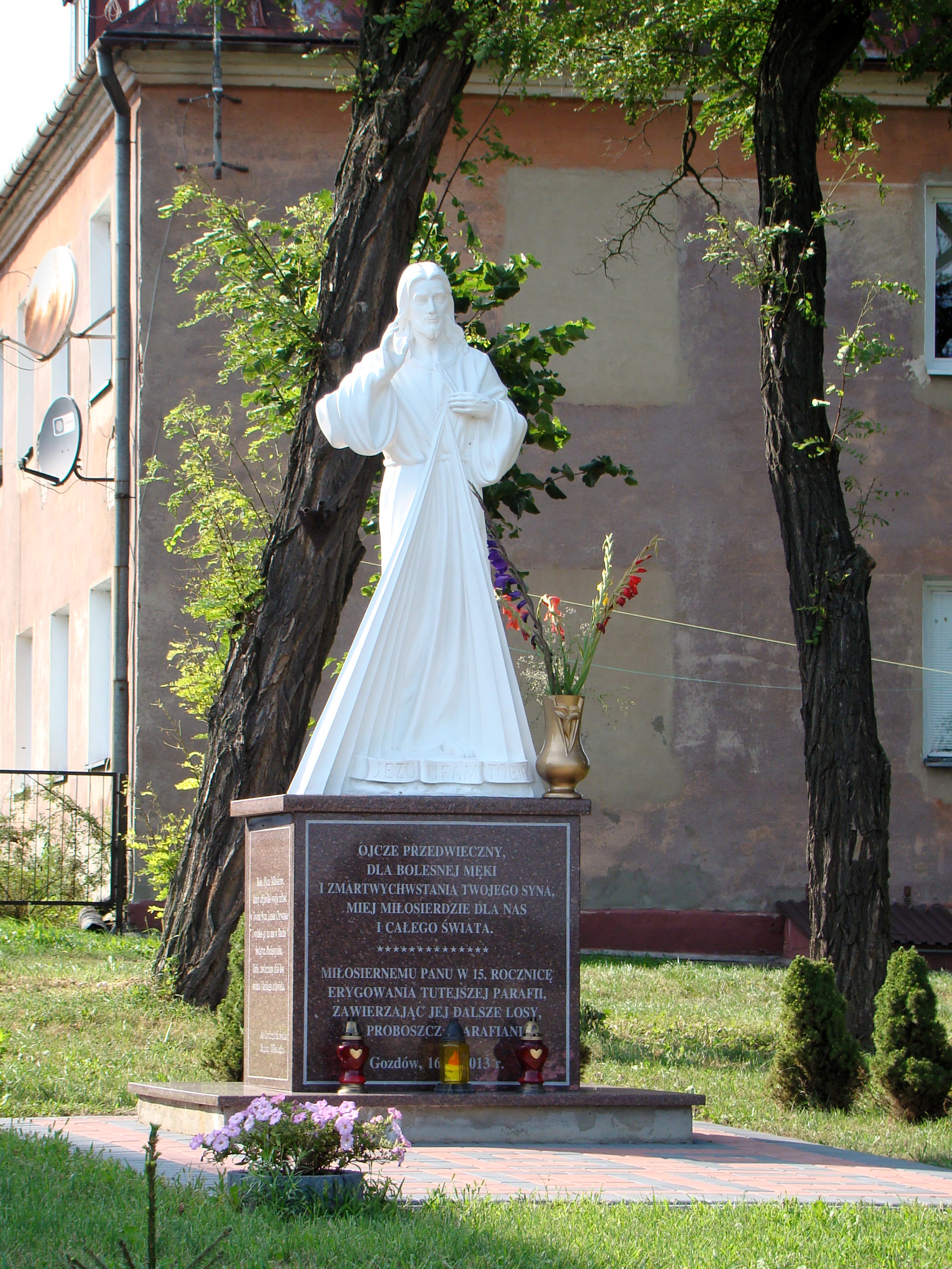
Jesus Christ figurine

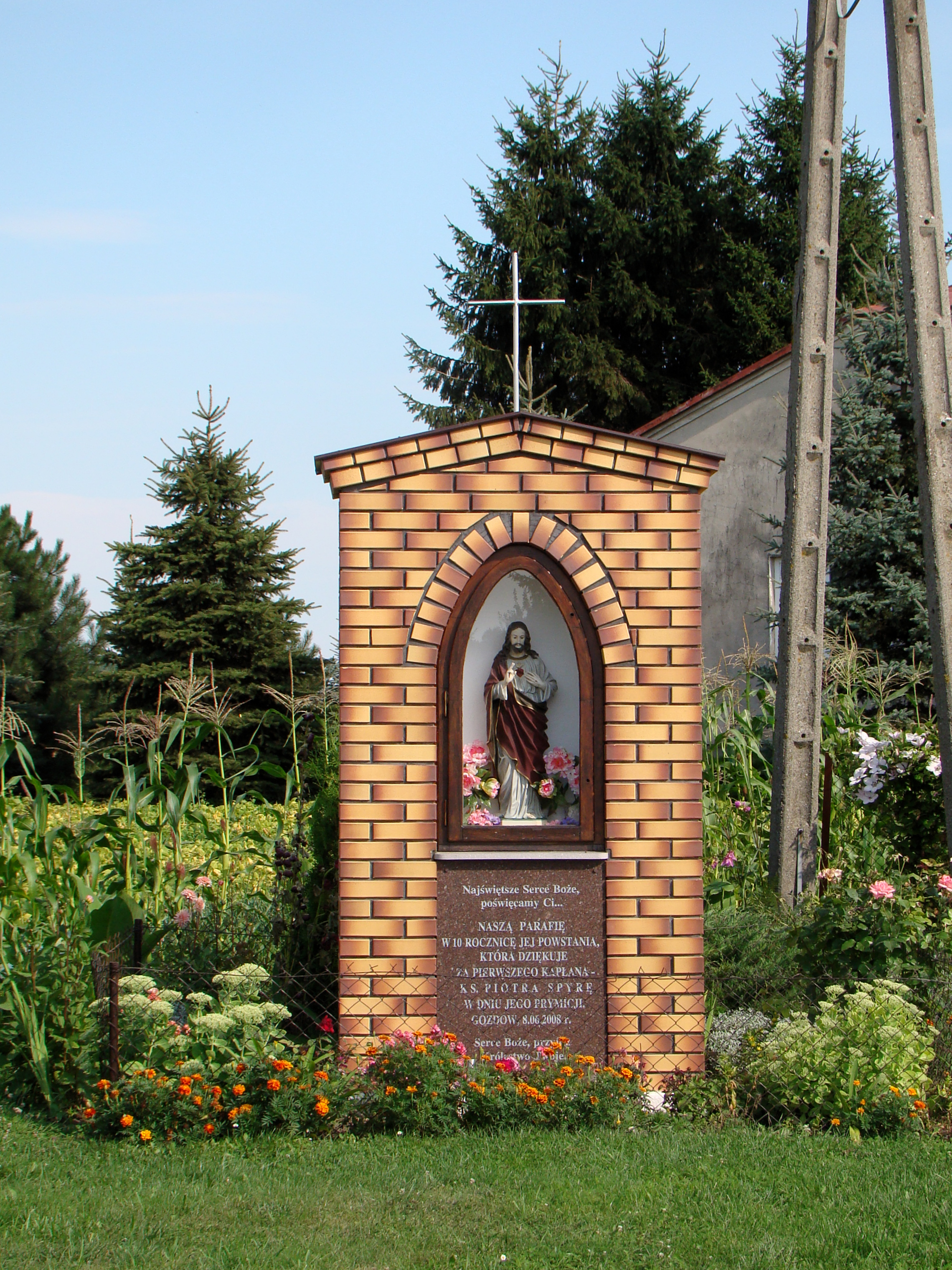
Wayside shrine
