= Honiatyczki =

- Village
- Location within Poland
- Coordinates: 50°42′N 23°41′E
- Country: Poland
- Voivodeship: Lublin
- County: Hrubieszów
- Gmina: Werbkowice

Honiatyczki [xɔɲaˈtɨt͡ʂki] is a village in the administrative district of Gmina Werbkowice, within Hrubieszów County, Lublin Voivodeship, in eastern Poland.
