= Adelina, Hrubieszów County =

Adelina
- Village
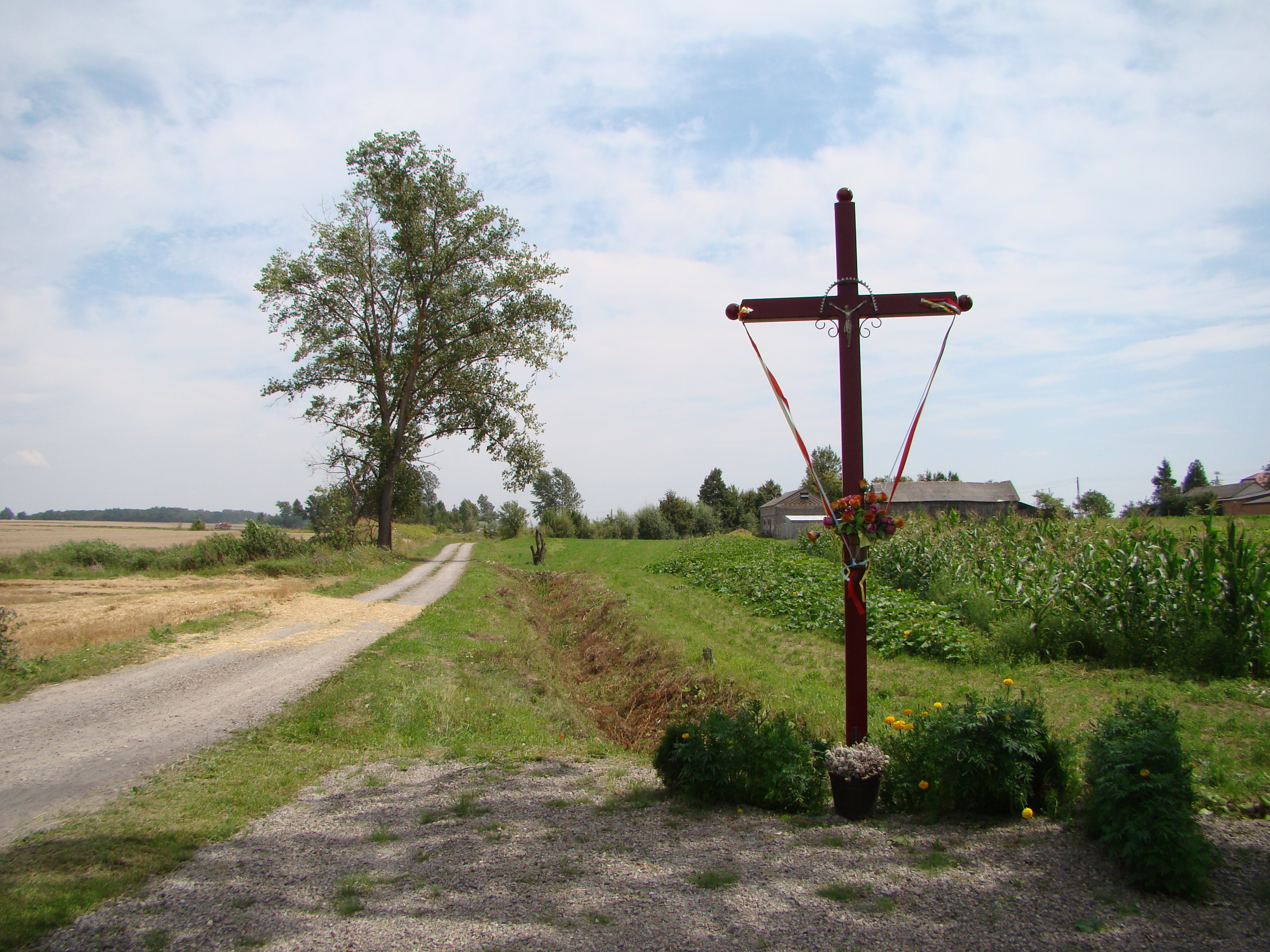
- Wayside cross in Adelina

- Location within Poland
- Coordinates: 50°40′N 23°47′E
- Country: Poland
- Voivodeship: Lublin
- County: Hrubieszów
- Gmina: Werbkowice

Adelina [adɛˈlina] is a village in the administrative district of Gmina Werbkowice, within Hrubieszów County, Lublin Voivodeship, in eastern Poland.
