= Gmina Werbkowice =

Gmina Werbkowice Werbkowice Commune
- Gmina
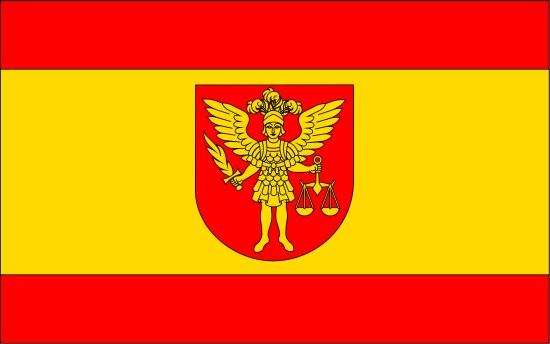
- Flag Coat of arms

- Location within Poland
- Coordinates (Werbkowice): 50°45′6″N 23°46′57″E
- Country: Poland
- Voivodeship: Lublin
- County: Hrubieszów
- Seat: Werbkowice

Area
  - Total: 188.26 km^{2} (72.69 sq mi)

Population (2013)
  - Total: 9,848
  - Density: 52.31/km^{2} (135.5/sq mi)
- Website: http://www.werbkowice.pl

Gmina Werbkowice is a rural gmina (administrative district) in Hrubieszów County, Lublin Voivodeship, in eastern Poland. Its seat is the village of Werbkowice, which lies approximately 11 kilometres (7 mi) south-west of Hrubieszów and 102 km (63 mi) south-east of the regional capital Lublin.

The gmina covers an area of 188.26 square kilometres (72.7 sq mi), and as of 2006 its total population is 10,111 (9,848 in 2013).

== Villages ==
Gmina Werbkowice contains the villages and settlements of Adelina, Alojzów, Dobromierzyce, Gozdów, Honiatycze, Honiatycze-Kolonia, Honiatyczki, Hostynne, Hostynne-Kolonia, Konopne, Kotorów, Łotów, Łysa Góra, Malice, Peresołowice, Podhorce, Sahryń, Sahryń-Kolonia, Strzyżowiec, Terebiń, Terebiniec, Turkowice, Werbkowice, Wilków, Wronowice and Zagajnik.

== Neighbouring gminas ==
Gmina Werbkowice is bordered by the gminas of Hrubieszów, Miączyn, Mircze, Trzeszczany and Tyszowce.
