= Stefan Niesiołowski =

Polish politician (born 1944)

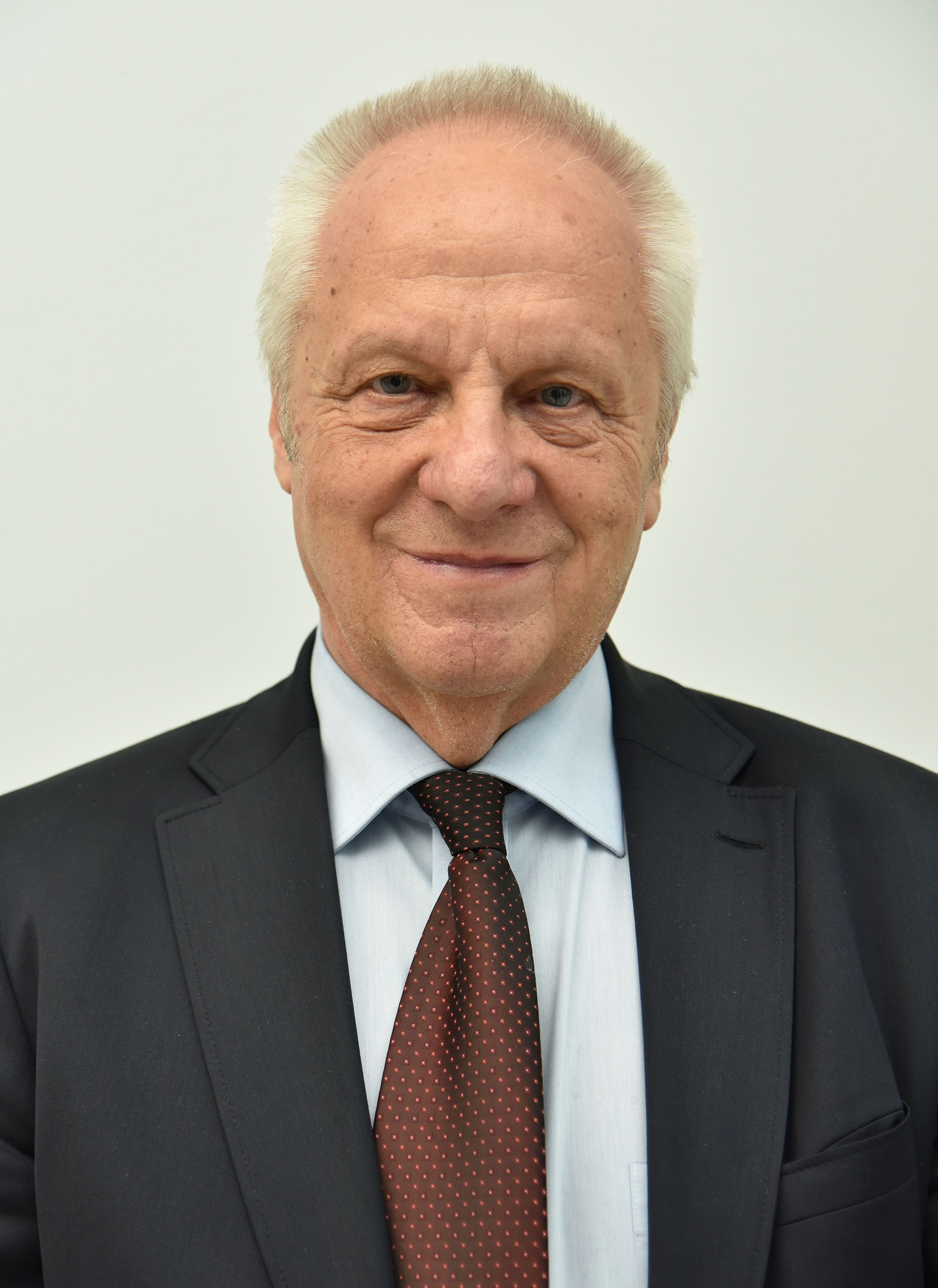

Marshal of the Sejm
- In office 8 July 2010 – 8 July 2010; Acting
- Preceded by: Bronisław Komorowski
- Succeeded by: Grzegorz Schetyna

Member of Sejm of the Republic of Poland
- In office 5 November 2007 – 11 November 2019
- In office 20 October 1997 – 18 October 2001
- In office 18 June 1989 – 31 May 1993

Member of Senate of the Republic of Poland
- In office 19 October 2005 – 4 November 2007

Personal details
- Born: 4 February 1944 (age 82) Kałęczew, Poland
- Party: Solidarity (before 1991); Christian National Union (1991-2001); Right Alliance (2001-2003); Civic Platform (2005-2016); Union of European Democrats (2016-present)
- Spouse: Anna Królikowska-Niesiołowska
- Children: daughter
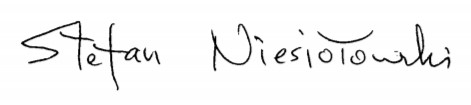
- Signature

Stefan Konstanty Myszkiewicz-Niesiołowski (Polish pronunciation: [ˈstɛfan ɲeɕɔˈwɔfskʲi]; born 4 February 1944) is a Polish politician and member of the Union of European Democrats. In 1970, Niesiołowski became involved in anti-communist opposition Ruch. He was the main proponent of burning down the Lenin Museum in Poronin, for which he was sentenced to 7 years imprisonment in 1971, and was released under amnesty in 1974. In 1980, Niesiołowski joined the Independent Self-governing Trade Union "Solidarity". During the martial law, Niesiołowski was imprisoned in Jaworze for around a year.
