= Henryk Lewczuk =

Polish soldier, activist and politician

Henryk Lewczuk (nom de guerre "Młot" (Hammer)) (born 4 July 1923 in Chełm, died 15 June 2009 in Chełm) was a Polish soldier, member of the Home Army (AK) and the anti-communist organization Freedom and Independence (WiN), an activist in the Polish emigrant community, politician and a delegate to the Polish Sejm from 2001 until 2005.
