= Movement for Defence of Human and Civic Rights =

Movement for Defence of Human and Civic Rights (Polish: Ruch Obrony Praw Człowieka i Obywatela, ROPCiO) was a right-wing political and social organization formed in People's Republic of Poland in March 1977. It tried to resist the regime by denouncing it for violating Polish and international laws including the Constitution of the People's Republic of Poland and International Covenant on Civil and Political Rights.

== History ==
The declaration, issued and presented to the press on March 26, 1977, was signed by 18 people, among them Andrzej Czuma and retired General Mieczysław Boruta-Spiechowicz. It explained that the aims of the ROPCiO were to preserve and defend the civil and human rights. In fact the real aim was to fight the Communist regime of the Polish United Workers' Party by legal means. The declaration was issued only three days after the Polish parliament had ratified the International Covenant on Civil and Political Rights. ROPCiO focused on preparation of open letters of protest to the communist government, organizing legal and financial support for the families of political prisoners and providing members of the anti-Communist opposition with brochures explaining their rights. Among such secretly-published books were also so-called handbooks to arrest, that is instructions on how to behave when arrested by the militia or the Urząd Bezpieczeństwa. ROPCiO also organized a net of legal advisors and published several magazines, mostly underground.

On September 16, 1978, a part of ROPCiO members led by Leszek Moczulski left the movement and established the ZINO movement, which later broke down into the Confederation of Independent Poland, Movement of Young Poland and Movement of Free Democrats. The remainder of ROPCiO gradually melted into the structures of the Solidarity after its forming.

== See also ==
- Workers' Defence Committee (KOR)
