= Werbkowice =

- Village
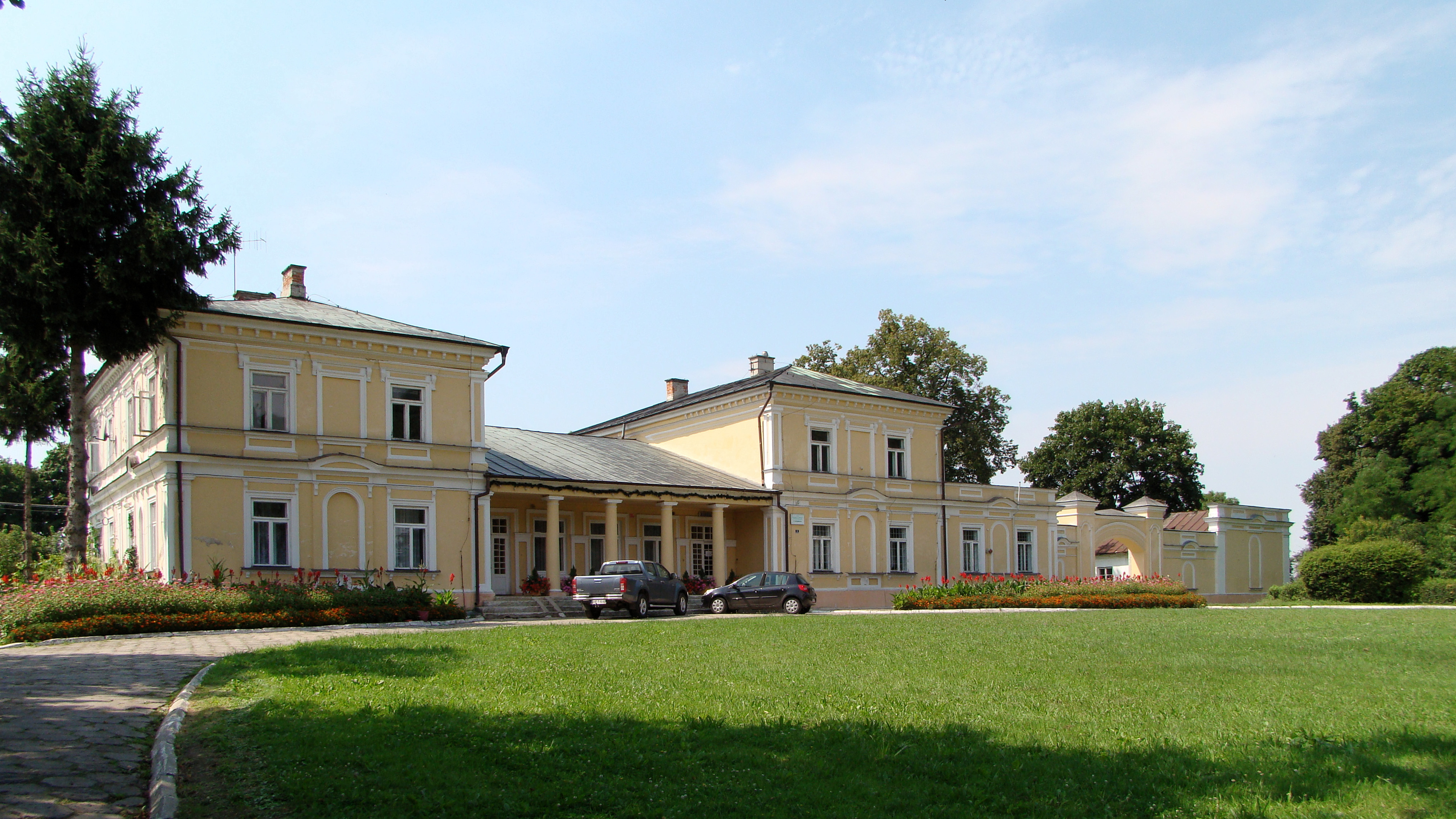
- Palace in Werbkowice

- Location within Poland
- Coordinates: 50°45′N 23°46′E
- Country: Poland
- Voivodeship: Lublin
- County: Hrubieszów
- Gmina: Werbkowice
- Population: 3,098

Werbkowice [vɛrpkɔˈvit͡sɛ] (Ukrainian: Вербковичі) is a village in Hrubieszów County, southeast part of the Lublin Voivodeship, in eastern Poland. It is the seat of the gmina (administrative district) called Gmina Werbkowice. It lays west of Hrubieszów, along the Huczwa river. Through it runs National Road no. 74.

According to the 2011 Polish census, the village has a population of 2941 and by population it is the biggest village in Werbkowice's gmina.

== Name ==
The name "Werbkowice" is connected with the local flora of the area and derives from the word "willow." Its equivalent in the Ruthenian language is the word verba or verbka. Today, in this form, the word exists in the Ukrainian language as верба (verba, "willow"). Moreover, in Silesia, the Wrbsky family was quite well known; in modern spelling, their name would be written as Wierzbiccy or Wierzbowscy.

== Monuments ==
Immovable monuments listed in the National Heritage Register (NID):

- Orthodox church, currently a Roman Catholic church, parish dedicated to the Blessed Virgin Mary and St. Michael (wooden, 1870); wooden bell tower; church cemetery – A/302 of 24 October 1984
- Palace (first half of the 19th century) – 205/56 of 9 May 1957, and the palace complex: annex, steward’s house, stable, fence with entrance gate, park – A/174 of 14 July 1977
- Transport layout of the Werbkowice–Hrubieszów narrow-gauge railway (1915) – A/502 of 27 November 1992

The municipal programme for the protection of monuments additionally lists the following heritage sites:

- School (28 Kopernika Street), brick building, 1890
- Brick school, 1926–1928
- Railway station, brick building, 1928
- Coal storage building near the station, first half of the 20th century
- Pump station near the railway station, 1928
- Water tower, 1945
- Statue of Our Lady of the Immaculate Conception, stone, 1770
- Statue of St. John of Nepomuk, stone, 19th century
- Statue of St. John of Nepomuk, stone, 1908
- Burial cemetery, active – 19th century
- Orthodox cemetery, inactive – 19th century
- Archaeological sites

== Sport ==
In Werbkowice, the Inter-Enterprise People’s Sports Club Kryształ Werbkowice operates as an amateur football club founded in 1973. Currently (the 2025/2026 season), the senior team competes in the IV League, Lublin group. The players of Kryształ Werbkowice play their matches at the stadium of the Municipal Sports and Recreation Centre in Werbkowice, which has a capacity of 2,500 seats.
