= Zbigniew Okoński =

Polish economist, politician (born 1949)

Zbigniew Wojciech Okoński (born 1949) is a Polish politician and businessman.

== Education ==
Okoński is a graduate of the University of Gdańsk and the University of Agriculture in Szczecin. He completed additional coursework at Michigan University.

== Political career ==
In 1995 Okoński served as the Minister of National Defence for Poland. He was previously an Undersecretary of State in the Ministry of Foreign Economic Cooperation.

== Business career ==
Okoński was part of the management board of Elektrim S.A. and the Chair of the Supervisory Boards of both BRE Bank S.A. and the Polish Foreign Investment Agency. In the years 1998-2007 he was a Vice President of the management board of Prokom Investments. He is presently the President of the management board of ROBYG S.A.

== Bibliography ==
- Forbes.pl
