= Plavie =

Village in Lviv Oblast, Ukraine

Plavie Плав'є Pławie
- Village
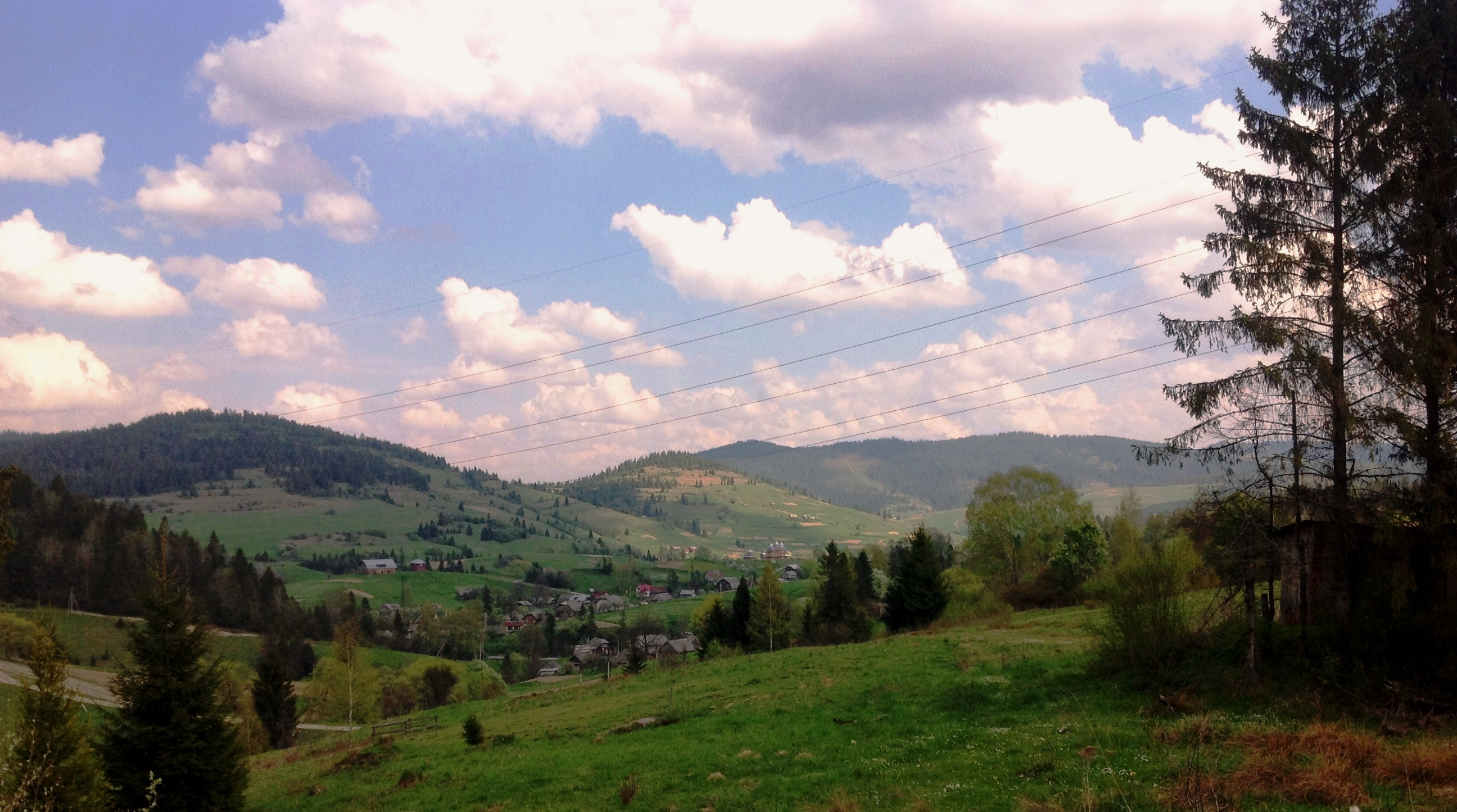
- View of the village Plavie.

- Location within Lviv Oblast Location within Ukraine
- Coordinates: 48°53′19″N 23°20′24″E
- Country: Ukraine
- Oblast: Lviv
- Raion: Stryi Raion
- Established: 1523

Area
  - Total: 4.47 km^{2} (1.73 sq mi)
- Elevation /(average value of): 650 m (2,130 ft)

Population
  - Total: 1,332
  - Density: 298/km^{2} (772/sq mi)
- Time zone: UTC+2 (EET)
  - Summer (DST): UTC+3 (EEST)
- Postal code: 82643
- Area code: +380 3251
- Website: село Плав'я _{(Ukrainian)}

Plavie (Ukrainian: Плав'є, Polish: Pławie) is a village (selo) in Stryi Raion, Lviv Oblast, in western Ukraine. The village is located in the Ukrainian Carpathians, within the limits of the Eastern Beskids (Skole Beskids) in southern Lviv Oblast. It belongs to Koziova rural hromada, one of the hromadas of Ukraine. Local government–Plavianska village council.

The first written mention of the settlement dates back to 1523.

Until 18 July 2020, Plavie belonged to Skole Raion. The raion was abolished in July 2020 as part of the administrative reform of Ukraine, which reduced the number of raions of Lviv Oblast to seven. The area of Skole Raion was merged into Stryi Raion.

== Geography ==
Remotely from Lviv on 132 km, from Skole - 26 km.
The village is located with the west side of the Mountain Ridge Dovzhky (998 – 1056 m), in the north - Ostrig (1003 m), in the east - the mountain Horby (863 m), and south the mountain Kolyska (867 m). This village is located on the altitude of 650 m above sea level, which forms here the mountain climate.
The settlement takes the form of a horseshoe that was formed as a result of confluence of two rivers (Brynivka and Vadrusivka).

== Culture ==
The folk legends known as Plavie was founded in 1523. and for the first time in writing referred to as "Splavie".
The village has two schools (Plavie-Brynivka and Plavie-Vadrusivka), and the folk ensemble "Brynivochka", which was based at the school.
Christians (mainly Greek Catholics) have an opportunity to visit the Church of St. Archangel Michael (Plavie-Brynivka) and the Church of St. Miracle Archangel Michael (Plavie-Vadrusivka).

The village has two monuments of Cultural Heritage in Ukraine:

- Church of St. Michael (wooden), 1888 Village Plav'ye;
- The bell tower of the church of St. Michael (wooden), 1886 Village Plav'ye.

== Famous people from Plavie ==
- Stepan Kalynevych (1883 – 1954), educator, organizer, has been for many years director of the school in the village Humnyska, Busk district (1931 – 1944) and in the village Plavie, Skole district (1945 – 1954).
- Chaykovskyy Roman Vasyliovych (literary pseudonym - Roman Olhovych) (1905 - 1994), poet, the Priest of the Parish of the village Plavie many years.
- Kosar Antin Hryhorovych (1912 - 1977), Priest of the Parish of the village Plavie from 1947 to 1977.
- Voloshyn Ivan Mykolayovych (1934), Ukrainian geographer, Doctor of Geographical Sciences, Professor, Head of the Department of Tourism of Lviv State University of Physical Culture.
- Jaroslava Korol (1954-2009), Ukrainian painter (sacred art).
- Myhaylo Polyanchych (1958), Ukrainian politician.

== Gallery ==
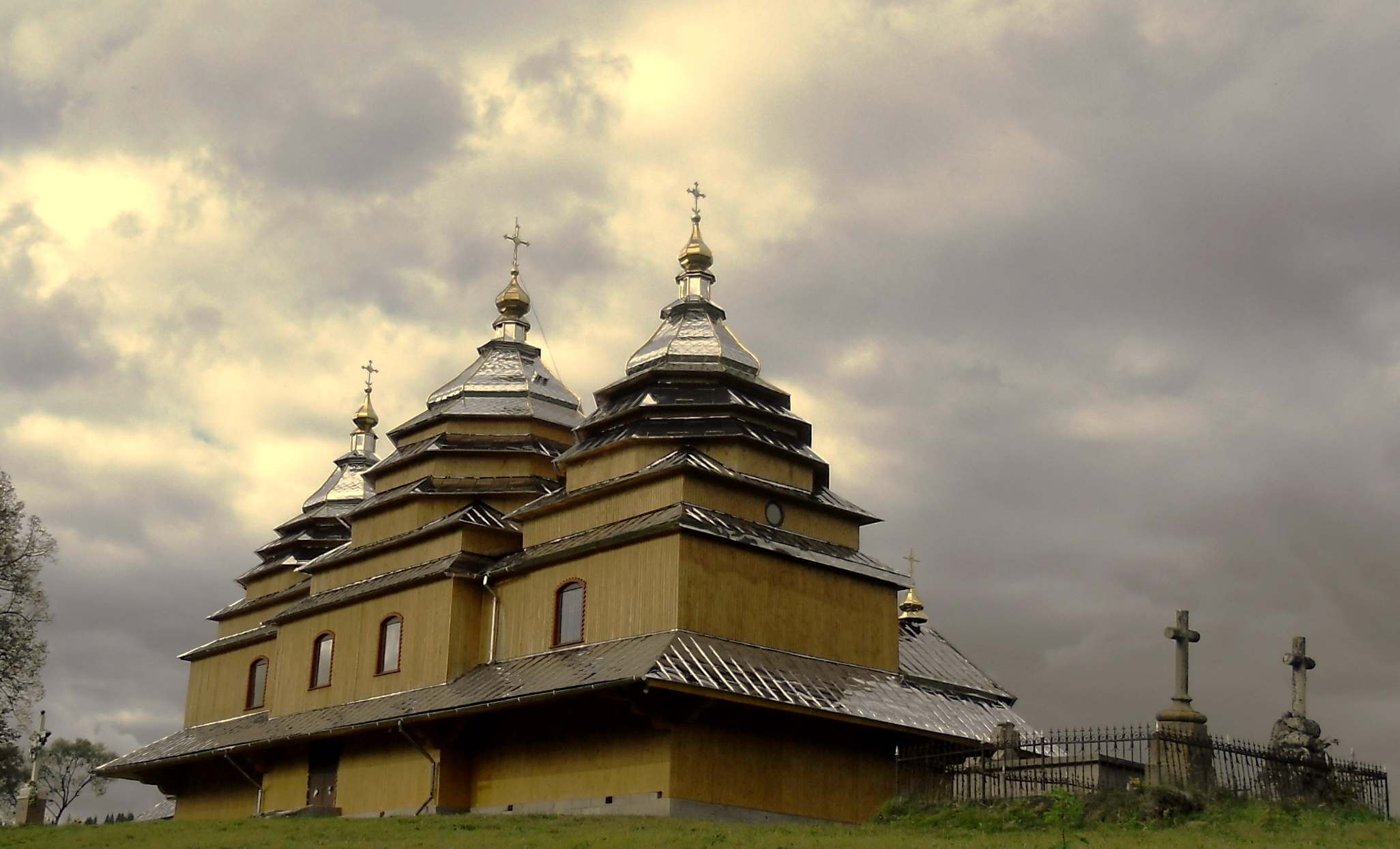
St. Nicholas Church. Plavie (Skole Raion).

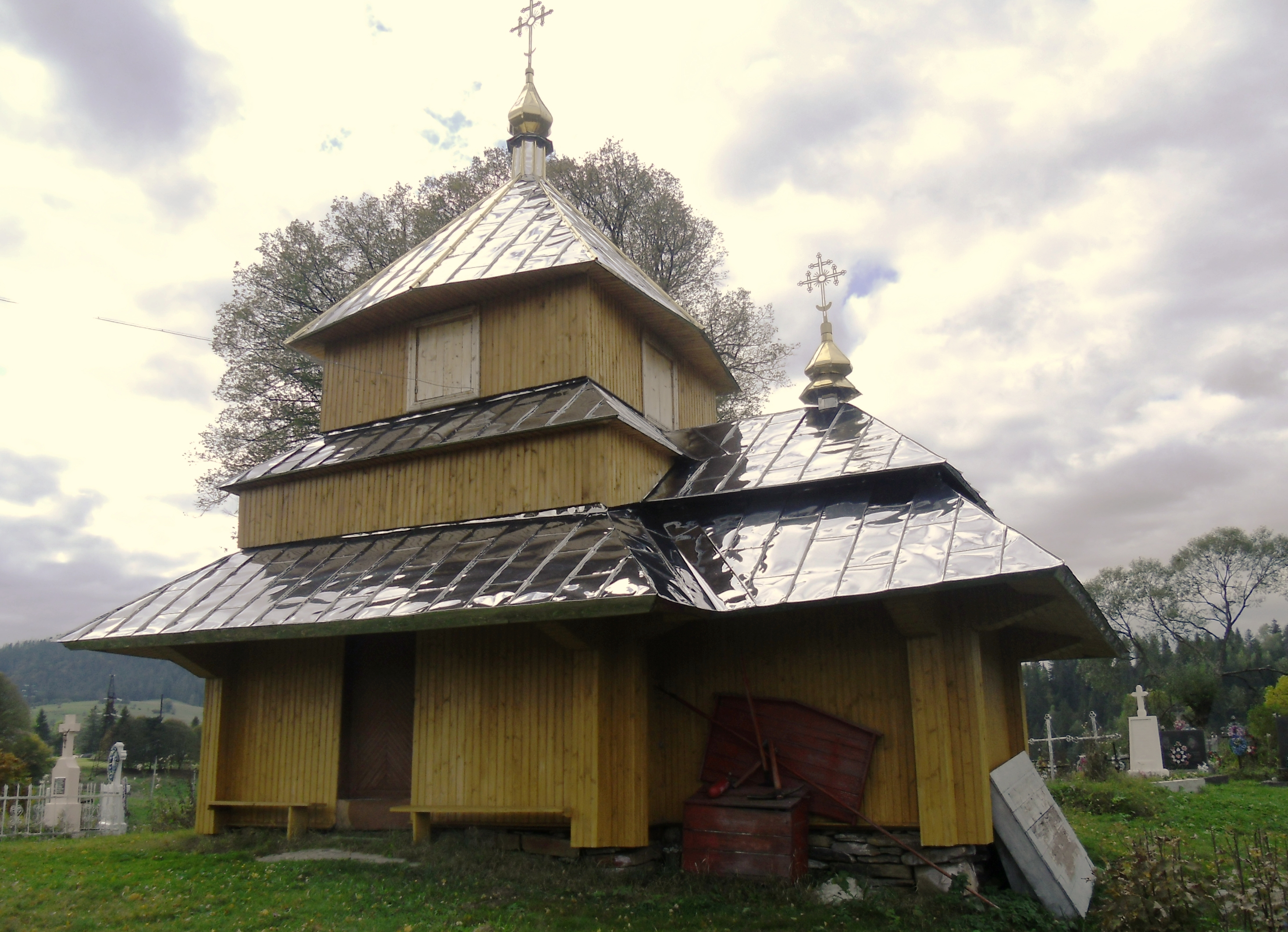
The bell tower of the church of St. Michael (wooden), 1886. Village Plavie.

== Literature ==
- Ukrainian: М. Арендач. Село Плав'є: погляд крізь віки. Львів: Ініціатива, 2012–176с. Редактор Ігор Дах.
