= Baluchyn =

Rural locality in Lviv Oblast, Ukraine

Baluchyn Балучин
- Interactive map of Baluchyn
- Coordinates: 49°58′0″N 24°37′0″E
- Country: Ukraine
- Oblast: Lviv Oblast
- Raion: Zolochiv Raion

Area
  - Total: 3.242 km^{2} (1.252 sq mi)

Population
  - Total: 608
- Time zone: UTC+2 (EET)
  - Summer (DST): UTC+3 (EEST)
- Postal code: 80565
- Area code: +380-3264

Baluchyn (Ukrainian: Балучин) is a village in Zolochiv Raion (district) of Lviv Oblast of western Ukraine. It belongs to Krasne settlement hromada, one of the hromadas of Ukraine. The distance from the village to the district centre is 15 km, to the railway station Krasne is 9 km, to the region centre is 45 km. Highway "Peremyshlyany-Berestechko" runs through the village. An area of settlement is 3.242 km^{2}, population is 608 inhabitants.

== History ==
Word "Baluchyn" was first mentioned in written sources for 1476.

During Austrian government village was a part of Firlejowka dominion and Brody district (from 1789 – Zolochiv district).

In 1885, Baluchyn's proprietor was lord Henrich who had mansion in neighboring village Kutkir. There were one class state school and public service loan in Baluchyn.

Brick church for public funds was built in 1891. The church was painted by Markiian Chuiko in 1938 while iconostasis was painted by Skrutkov in 1907.

In 1941, during German occupation there was Ukrainian school with German language learning. School consisted of four classes.

Until 18 July 2020, Baluchyn belonged to Busk Raion. The raion was abolished in July 2020 as part of the administrative reform of Ukraine, which reduced the number of raions of Lviv Oblast to seven. The area of Busk Raion was merged into Zolochiv Raion.

== Demographics ==
According to Census 2001 language use looks like that:

Language	Percent
Ukrainian	99.55
Russian	0.3
Belarusian	0.15

== Gallery ==
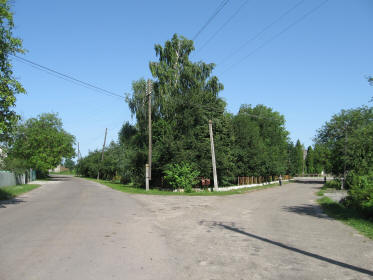
Kutova street

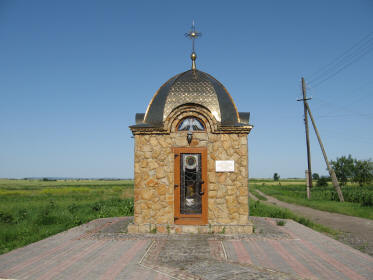
