= Chuchmany =

Rural locality in Lviv Oblast, Ukraine

Chuchmany Чучмани
- Village
- Location within Lviv Oblast
- Coordinates: 49°58′30″N 24°41′06″E
- Country: Ukraine
- Oblast: Lviv Oblast
- District: Zolochiv Raion
- Established: 1476

Area
  - Total: 1,524 km^{2} (588 sq mi)
- Elevation /(average value of): 221 m (725 ft)

Population
  - Total: 297
  - Density: 0.195/km^{2} (0.505/sq mi)
- Time zone: UTC+2 (EET)
  - Summer (DST): UTC+3 (EEST)
- Postal code: 80527
- Area code: +380 3264
- Website: село Чучмани^{(Ukrainian)}

Chuchmany (Ukrainian: Чучмани́) – a small village (selo) in Zolochiv Raion, Lviv (province) of Western Ukraine. It belongs to Busk urban hromada, one of the hromadas of Ukraine.

About 297 people currently live in the village and local government is administered by the Humnyska village council.

== Geography ==
The village is located 2 kilometres (1.2 mi) from European route E40, which connects Lviv with Kyiv. Its distance from the regional center of Lviv is 58 kilometres (36 mi), 5 kilometres (3.1 mi) from the district center of Busk, and 486 kilometres (302 mi) from Kyiv.

== History and Religion ==
The earliest known written mention dates back to 1476, but traces exist of Stone Age settlement (third millennium BC). Archaeological excavations revealed these near the villages of Chuchmany and Humnyska.

Christians of Chuchmany belong to the parish of Humnyska.

Until 18 July 2020, Chuchmany belonged to Busk Raion. The raion was abolished in July 2020 as part of the administrative reform of Ukraine, which reduced the number of raions in Lviv Oblast to seven. The area of Busk Raion was merged into Zolochiv Raion.
