= Chishki, Zolochiv Raion, Lviv Oblast =

Rural locality in Lviv Oblast, Ukraine

Coordinates: 49°59′31″N 24°56′33″E

Chishki
- Village
- Interactive map of Chishki
- Country: Ukraine
- Oblast: Lviv
- Raion: Zolochiv
- Area: 1,344 km^{2} (519 sq mi)
- Population: 208

Chishki (Ukrainian: Чішки) is a village (selo) in Zolochiv Raion, Lviv Oblast, in western Ukraine. It belongs to Busk urban hromada, one of the hromadas of Ukraine. Chishki was established in 1475. The village has 208 inhabitants.

Until 18 July 2020, Chishki belonged to Busk Raion. The raion was abolished in July 2020 as part of the administrative reform of Ukraine, which reduced the number of raions of Lviv Oblast to seven. The area of Busk Raion was merged into Zolochiv Raion.

On 19 September 2024, the Verkhovna Rada voted to change the spelling of Chishki to Chyshki.
