= Andrii Koverko =

Ukrainian sculptor (1893–1967)

- Андрій Йосипович Коверко
- Born: 28 August 1893; Ostriv, now Krasne Hromada, Zolochiv Raion, Lviv Oblast, Ukraine
- Died: 19 July 1967 (aged 73); Chișinău, Moldova
- Education: Kolomyia Art and Industrial School, Oleksa Novakivskyi Art School
- Occupation: Sculptor

Andrii Koverko (Ukrainian: Андрій Йосипович Коверко; 28 August 1893 – 19 July 1967) was a Ukrainian sculptor. In 1963 he became a member of the Union of Artists of Ukraine.

== Biography ==
Andrii Koverko was born on 28 August 1893 in Ostriv, now the Krasne Hromada of the Zolochiv Raion of the Lviv Oblast of Ukraine.

In 1914, he graduated from the Kolomyia Art and Industrial School, and in 1924 from the Oleksa Novakivskyi Art School. During the World War I, he took part in the struggle for Ukrainian statehood.

He died on 19 July 1967 in Chișinău, Moldova.

== Works ==
He created portrait busts, figurative groups, reliefs in wood, stone, marble, plaster, and bronze. In 1922, he began participating in exhibitions.

In 1932, he made a statue to Andrey Sheptytsky, which was destroyed in 1945, but a plaster model was preserved. On 25 July 2015, the statue of Metropolitan Andrey Sheptytsky, designed by Andrii Koverko, was installed and unveiled on 29 July 2015 in the square in front of St. George's Archdiocesan Cathedral.

Among the main works:

- series "Writers and Artists" (1922);
- new stone busts of Taras Shevchenko for the monuments to the poet in Lviv (1925) and Kolomyia (1929), which were damaged during the World War I; and busts of Mykhailo Voronnyi (1920s), Petro Kholodnyi Senior (1931); relief and bust of Ivan Franko (1926; 1940); plaquette "Josyf Slipyj" (1933);
- carved portraits of "Metropolitan Andrey Sheptytsky" (1931), "Dmytro Vitovskyi" (1933), "Ivan Franko", and "Oleksa Novakivskyi" (both 1943);
- easel figures "Head of an Angel" (1931), "Footballer" (1933), "Torso of a Woman" (1934), "Runner" (1936);
- made tombstones at the Lychakiv Cemetery on the graves of Ivan Lypa (1937), K. Rozhanska (1941), and Yaroslav Antonovych-Hordynskyi (1943);
- columns, a marble fountain, and a majolica stove with bronze allegorical reliefs for a coffee shop located in Lviv Town Hall (1941).

Other works:

- iconostasis with the coat of arms of Ukraine – Trident (lost) of the Chapel of the Holy Spirit of the Greek Catholic Theological Seminary in Lviv (1927);
- portal of the Chapel of the Three Hierarchs with Angels for the Dormition Church in Lviv (1927);
- reliefs "Emmaus" (1931), "Parable of the Talents" (1934);
- сarved frame of the Holy Sepulcher (1931, painting by Vasyl Dyadyniuk)
- altar crosses and the relief "Laying in the Tomb" for St. George's Cathedral in Lviv (1936)
- altar reliefs for the Church of the Ascension in Znesinnia and the altar in the chapel of the gymnasium of the Basilian Sisters (1938–1939);
- thrones and other church items for the St. Onufriy Monastery in Lviv, the Church of St. Peter and Paul in Sokal, and the Church of the Nativity in Zhovkva (1930s);
- covers of the "Ukrainian Art" magazine, the books "Amok" and "Letter to a Stranger" by Stefan Zweig, and the design of the book "Knight in Black Velvet" by Antin Lototskyi (1928).

In 1952, Koverko's works, which were stored in the collections of the National Museum in Lviv, were destroyed.
