= Jaroslava Korol =

- Ярослава Король
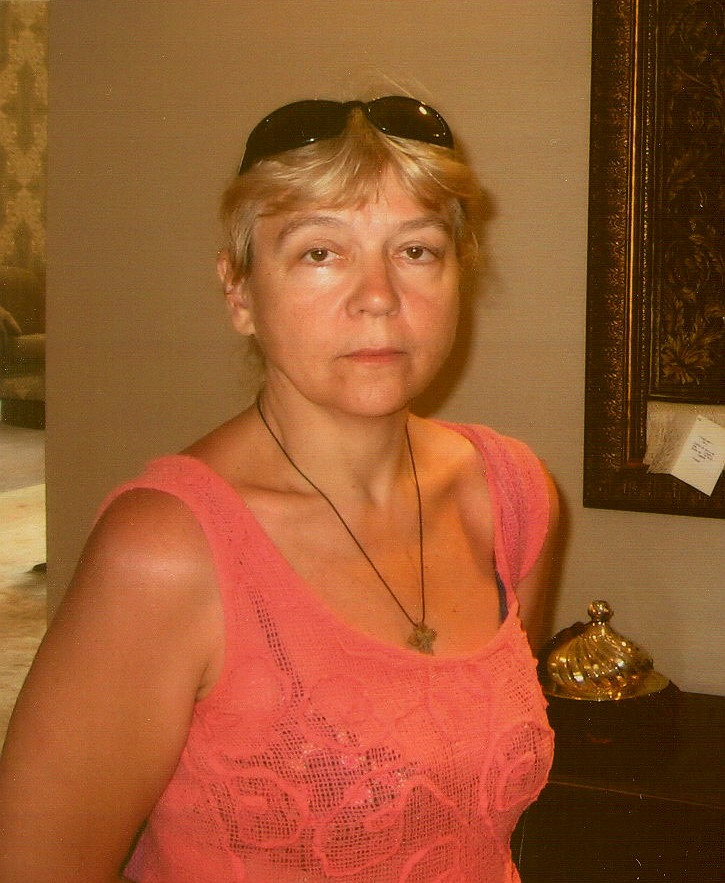
- Jaroslava Korol
- Born: Jaroslava Antonivna Kosar; Ярослава Антонівна Косар; 25 June 1954; Plavie, Lviv Oblast, Ukrainian SSR, Soviet Union
- Died: 10 July 2009 (aged 55); Lviv, Ukraine
- Resting place: Malekhiv Cemetery
- Education: Lviv National Academy of Arts (1972–1977).
- Known for: Painting, Drawing
- Movement: Ukrainian impressionist

Jaroslava Korol (1954–2009, Ukrainian: Яросла́ва Коро́ль), née Kosar (Ukrainian: Коса́р) was a Ukrainian painter. Genre – painter, sacred art.

== Biography ==
Jaroslava Korol was born on June 25, 1954, in Plavie, Skole Raion), Lviv Oblast. She was born in the family of the priest Anton and Maria. After graduation from high school in 1971 with a gold medal, she enrolled at the Department of Art Pottery at Lviv State Institute of Applied and Decorative Art (1972–1977).
From 1977 she lived in Lviv and worked as a graphic designer. Since the late 1980s she started an interesting period of searching creative identities. This is area of religious and historical painting, symbolic and of allegorical compositions.
She died after a long illness July 10, 2009, and was buried at the Cemetery of village Malekhiv.

== Artworks ==
The eternal problem of good and evil, beauty and ugliness, grand and comic, true and evil embodied in works of art Ya.Korol.
Direction – symbolic – allegorical subject compositions.
Among them: Svyatyy Mykolay (St. Nicholas), cardboard, oil, 60х42 cm, 2009; Schaslyvoyi dorohy (Have a nice trip), oil on canvas, 30х60 cm, 2008; Hratsiyi (Graces), oil on canvas, 50х50 cm, 2007; Spas v sylah (Feast of the Transfiguration in forces), cardboard, oil, 110х50 cm, 2000; Heorhiy Peremozhets (Saint George the Victorious), oil on canvas, 120x90 cm, 2003.
The artist at his work is inclined to realize themselves, and up to of philosophizing. This can be seen in such works: Gra v karty (The Card Play), Zamkova shparynka (Keyhole), Chorna maska (The Black Mask), Rankovyy tuman (Morning Mist) (2007).
A special place in the work of the artist is the theme of the birth of Christ and Our Lady, characteristic of sacred art it always reflects the spiritual, moral, aesthetic values and society of his time, by giving special status to the cost of holiness. Latitude her of creative interests impressive. She depicts not only religious icons, but also the paintings on historical and literary topics.
Yaroslava Korol was among the personalities, who worked on cultural artistic era of art in Lviv in the second half of the 20th century. Her artworks are kept in museums, churches and private collections in Ukraine, Italy, UK, France and Canada.

== Exhibitions ==
=== List of solo exhibitions ===
- 1992 – "icon on the glass", Item exhibition of students monastery Lviv
- 1993 – Collective exhibition "Lviv Spring 93", National Museum in Lviv, Lviv Art Gallery, Museum of Ethnography and Crafts IN NAS, Lviv,
- 1995 – Collective exhibition "Easter" from "The Art of Franko edge" (Lviv literary-memorial museum of Ivan Franko),
- 1996 – personal exhibition in the Museum "Boykivshchyna", Sambir,
- 1996 – Art Exhibition "Woman In History" International Fund "Renaissance",
- 1997 – personal exhibition in Uzhhorod Museum of Folk Architecture and Life,
- 1997 – personal exhibition in the Museum of Ethnography and Crafts IN NASU, Lviv,
- 1998 – Collective exhibition "Creative Workshop '98" International Fund "Revival", Lviv Academy of Arts,
- 2000 – personal exhibition in the Museum of Ethnography and Crafts IN NASU, Lviv,
- 2000 – Collective Exhibition of art stained glass, paintings, blown glass, ceramics, " Roztochanskyy collection – 2000 ", Starychi, Yavoriv Raion,
- 2000 – personal exhibition, Literary-Memorial Museum-Apartment Pavlo Tychyna, Kyiv,
- 2002 – Collective exhibition "In the 21st century – the art of", Lviv, Palace of Arts,
- 2003 – Collective exhibition "Carpathians: legends of our land," Municipal Arts Centre Alcorcón in Madrid, Spain,
- 2007 – personal exhibition in the State Memorial Museum of Mikhail Hrushevsky in Lviv.

== Gallery ==
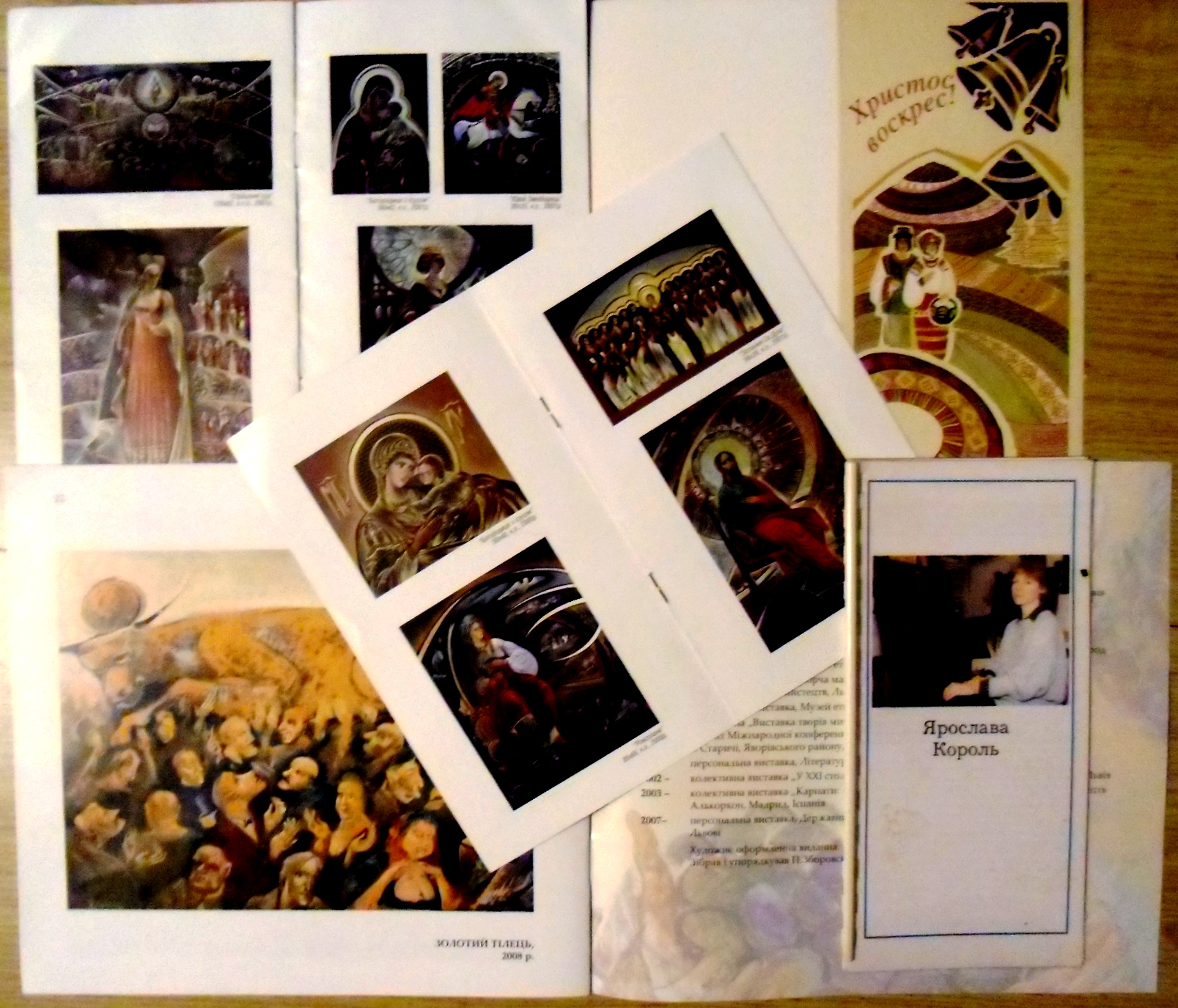
Creative achievements of the artist Jaroslava Korol (Kosar)

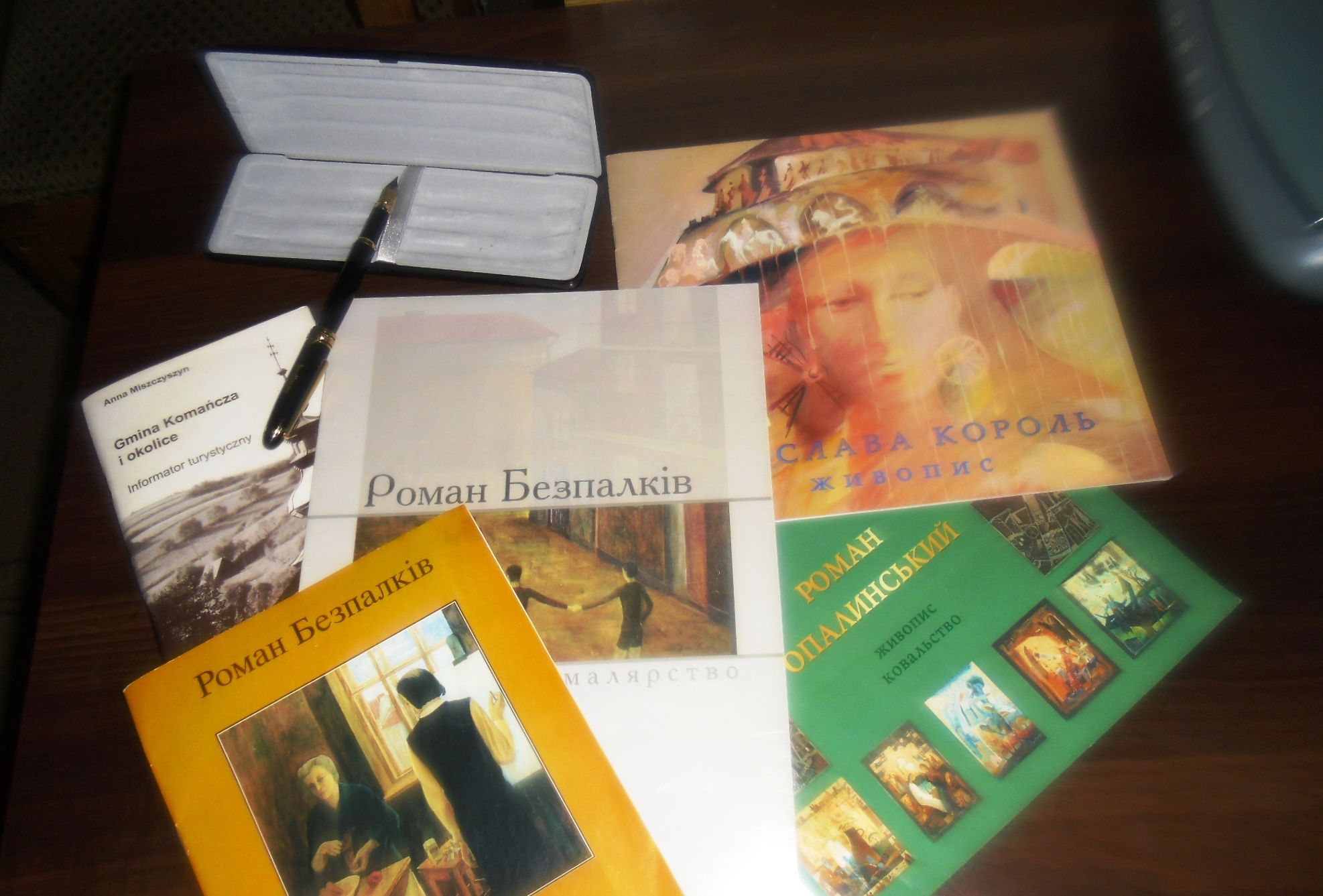
The painters of Lviv

== Literature ==
- (in Ukrainian) "Львівська національна академія мистецтв", ТОВ Видавничий центр "Логос Україна", св. Державного реєстру видавців № 3093 від 29.01.2008 р.
- (in Ukrainian) Ярослава Король (живопис), Львів, 2009.
