= Zabrid =

Rural locality in Lviv Oblast, Ukraine

- Village
- Location within Lviv Oblast Location within Ukraine
- Coordinates: 50.0581°N 24.5022°E
- Country: Ukraine
- Oblast: Lviv
- Raion: Zolochiv
- Area: 031 km^{2} (12 sq mi)
- Population: 85

Zabrid (Ukrainian: Забрід) is a village (selo) in Zolochiv Raion, Lviv Oblast, in western Ukraine. It belongs to Busk urban hromada, one of the hromadas of Ukraine. Zabrid was established in 1500. The village has 85 inhabitants.

Until 18 July 2020, Zabrid belonged to Busk Raion. The raion was abolished in July 2020 as part of the administrative reform of Ukraine, which reduced the number of raions of Lviv Oblast to seven. The area of Busk Raion was merged into Zolochiv Raion.
