= Pobuzhany =

Rural locality in Lviv Oblast, Ukraine

Pobuzhany Побужани
- Village
- Location within Lviv Oblast
- Coordinates: 50°00′51″N 24°33′35″E
- Country: Ukraine
- Oblast: Lviv Oblast
- District: Zolochiv Raion
- Established: 1433

Area
  - Total: 4,400 km^{2} (1,700 sq mi)
- Elevation /(average value of): 214 m (702 ft)

Population
  - Total: 1,040
  - Density: 0.24/km^{2} (0.61/sq mi)
- Time zone: UTC+2 (EET)
  - Summer (DST): UTC+3 (EEST)
- Postal code: 80513
- Area code: +380 3264

Pobuzhany (Ukrainian: Побужа́ни) is a village (selo), which is located in Zolochiv Raion, Lviv Oblast of Western Ukraine. It belongs to Busk urban hromada, one of the hromadas of Ukraine. Pobuzhany is a small village, which has an area of 4.4 km^{2}. The population of the village is about 1040 people and Local government is administered by Pobuzhanska village council.

== Geography ==
The village is located on the right bank of Western Bug river, and is at the north-west of the Highway M06 (Ukraine) ( M 06) at a distance 9 kilometres (5.6 mi) from the district center Busk, Ukraine and 59 kilometres (37 mi) from the regional center of Lviv, on the altitude of 214 metres (700 ft)above sea level.

== History ==
The first written records mention the village 1433.

Until 18 July 2020, Pobuzhany belonged to Busk Raion. The raion was abolished in July 2020 as part of the administrative reform of Ukraine, which reduced the number of raions of Lviv Oblast to seven. The area of Busk Raion was merged into Zolochiv Raion.

== Cult constructions and religion ==
The village has active Church of Christ's Resurrection (stone, 2002) and wooden church and bell tower of Church the Ascension of the Lord (1777) preserved in the village. This is a wooden church, an architectural monument of local importance.
