= Stepan Kalynevych =

- Степан Калиневич
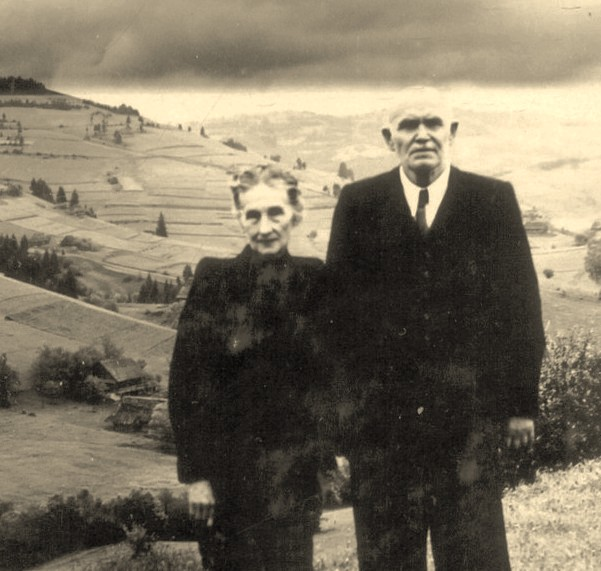
- Theophilia and Stepan Kalynevych in Plavie
- Born: 1883; Busk
- Died: 26 November 1954; Plavie.
- Resting place: Plavie cemetery.

Stepan Kalynevych (1883-1954, Ukrainian: Калине́вич Степа́н Льво́вич) – educator, organizer and director of the societies Prosvita in Humnyska. He was a musician, director of the choir, the head of Drama Theatre, was a member of the "Society of mutual assistance Ukrainian of teaching", the founder and many years director of the school in the village Humnyska, Busk district (1931-1944) and in the village Plavie, Skole district (1945-1954).

== Biography ==
Stepan Kalynevych was born in the family priest in 1883 in the Busk city, of that time Austro-Hungarian Empire. The first director of the school, which was built in 1931 in the village of Humnyska, was Stepan Kalinevich. Stepan Kalynevych and his wife Kalynevych Teofiliya (née Chuchman, 1886 – 1957) they both worked with dedication over the by show of and affirmation of national identity and the general cultural level of the peasants.

He was director of the school in Plavie from 1945 to 1954.

Stepan Kalynevych died on 26 November 1954 after a serious illness. He was buried in the village Plavie at the cemetery together with his wife Teofiliya Kalynevych (1886-1957), née Chuchman.

== Literature ==
- Ukrainian: М. Арендач. Село Плав'є: погляд крізь віки. Львів: Ініціатива, 2012–176с. Редактор Ігор Дах. (V.6. Культурний розвиток, стор. 120)
