= Kuty, Busk urban hromada, Zolochiv Raion, Lviv Oblast =

Rural locality in Lviv Oblast, Ukraine

Coordinates: 49°59′43″N 24°53′17″E

Kuty
- Village
- Interactive map of Kuty
- Country: Ukraine
- Oblast: Lviv
- Raion: Zolochiv
- Area: 2,633 km^{2} (1,017 sq mi)
- Population: 478

Kuty (Ukrainian: Кути) is a village (selo) in Zolochiv Raion, Lviv Oblast, in western Ukraine. It belongs to Busk urban hromada, one of the hromadas of Ukraine. Kuty was established in 1441. The village has 478 inhabitants.

Until 18 July 2020, Kuty belonged to Busk Raion. The raion was abolished in July 2020 as part of the administrative reform of Ukraine, which reduced the number of raions of Lviv Oblast to seven. The area of Busk Raion was merged into Zolochiv Raion.

== Gallery ==
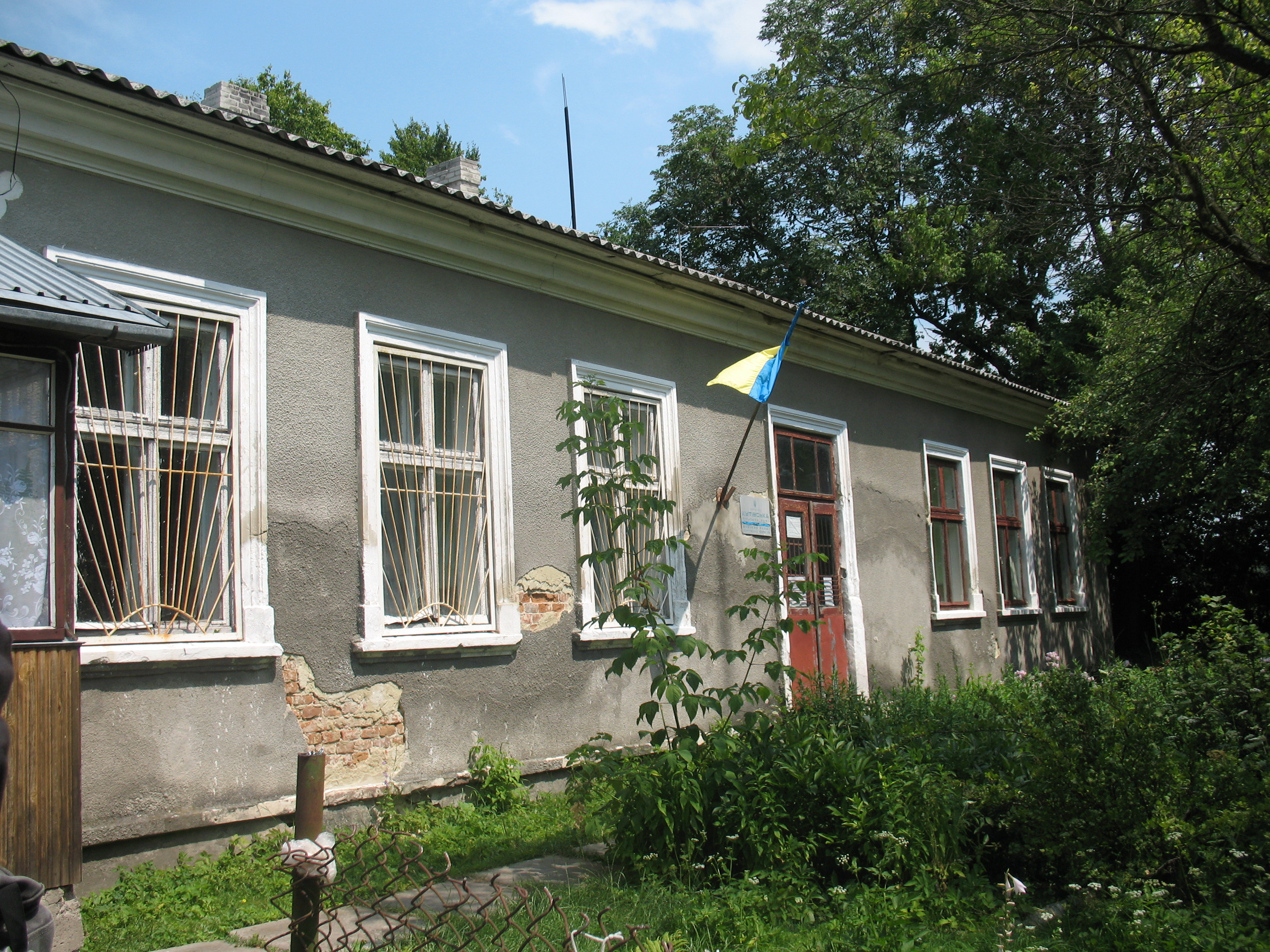
Town hall

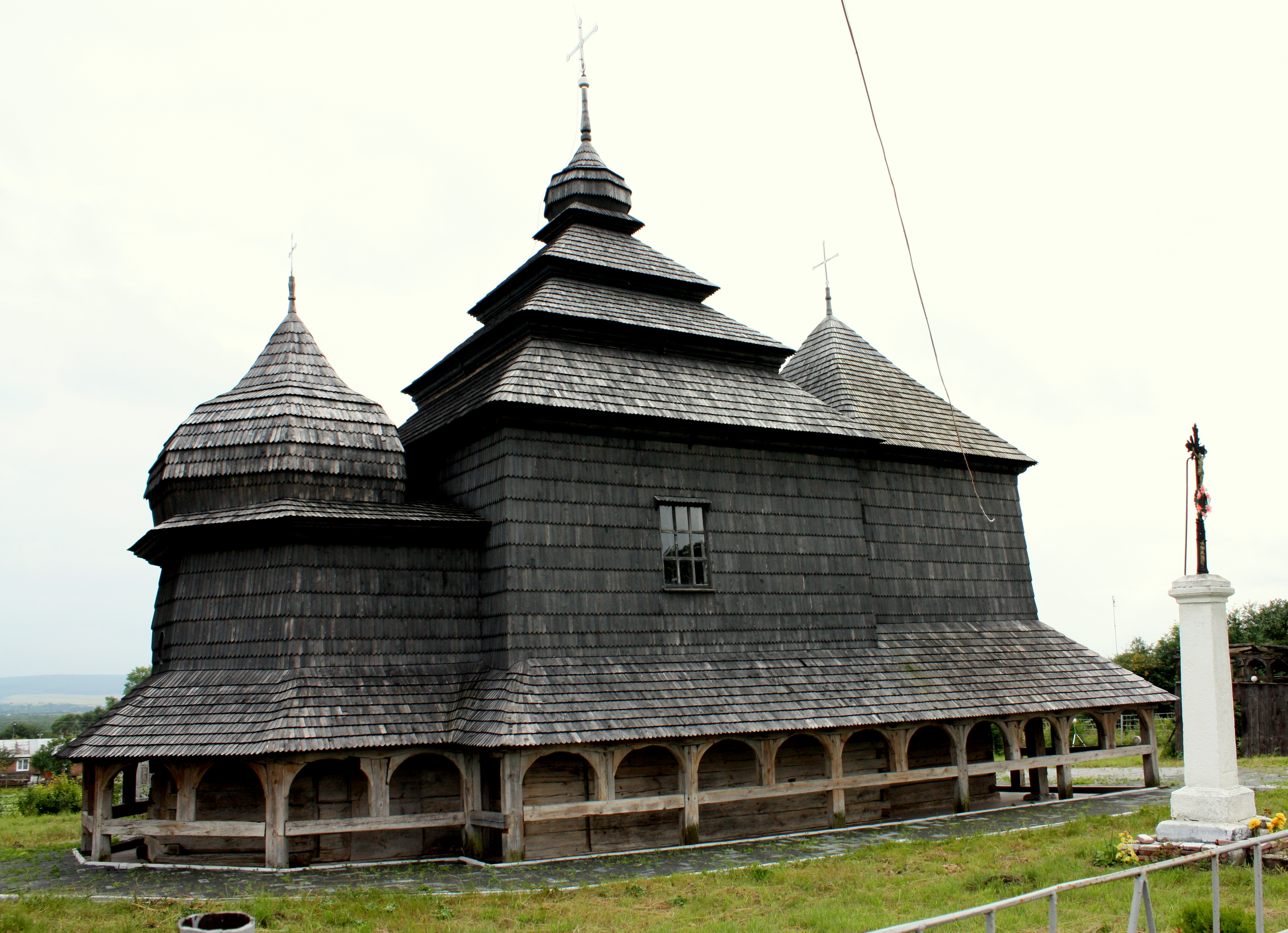
Wooden church of Saint Michael, built in 1697

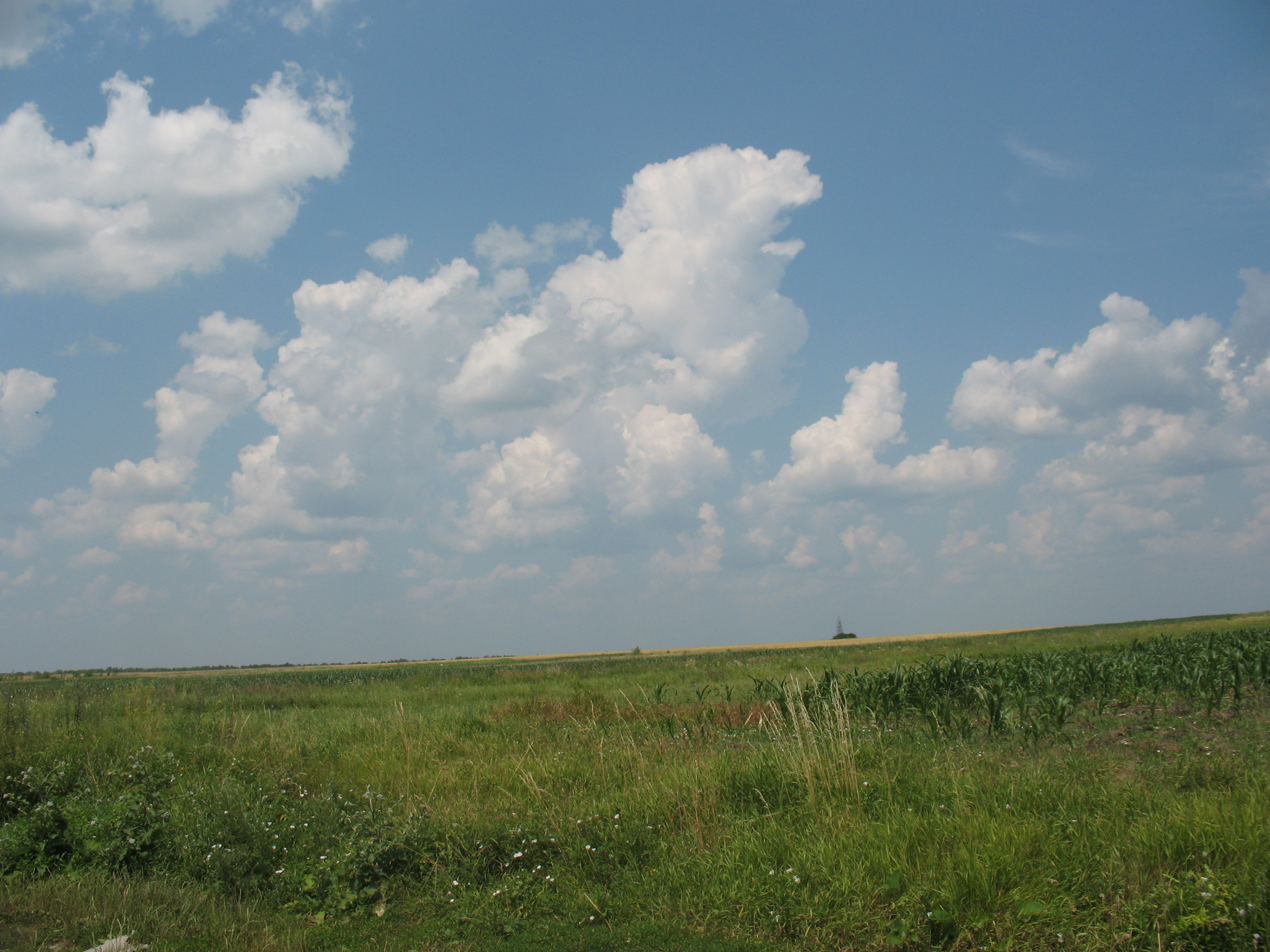
