= Huta, Zolochiv Raion, Lviv Oblast =

Rural locality in Lviv Oblast, Ukraine

Coordinates: 50°6′45″N 24°39′42″E

Huta
- Village
- Interactive map of Huta
- Country: Ukraine
- Oblast: Lviv
- Raion: Zolochiv
- Area: 2,437 km^{2} (941 sq mi)
- Population: 244

Huta (Ukrainian: Гута) is a village (selo) in Zolochiv Raion, Lviv Oblast, in western Ukraine. It belongs to Busk Urban Hromada, one of the hromadas of Ukraine. Huta was established in 1600. The village has 244 inhabitants.

Until 18 July 2020, Huta belonged to Busk Raion. The raion was abolished in July 2020 as part of Ukraine's administrative reform, which reduced the number of raions in Lviv Oblast to seven. The area of Busk Raion was merged into Zolochiv Raion.
