= Lisok, Zolochiv Raion, Lviv Oblast =

Rural locality in Lviv Oblast, Ukraine

Coordinates: 49°55′59″N 24°27′22″E

Lisok
- Village
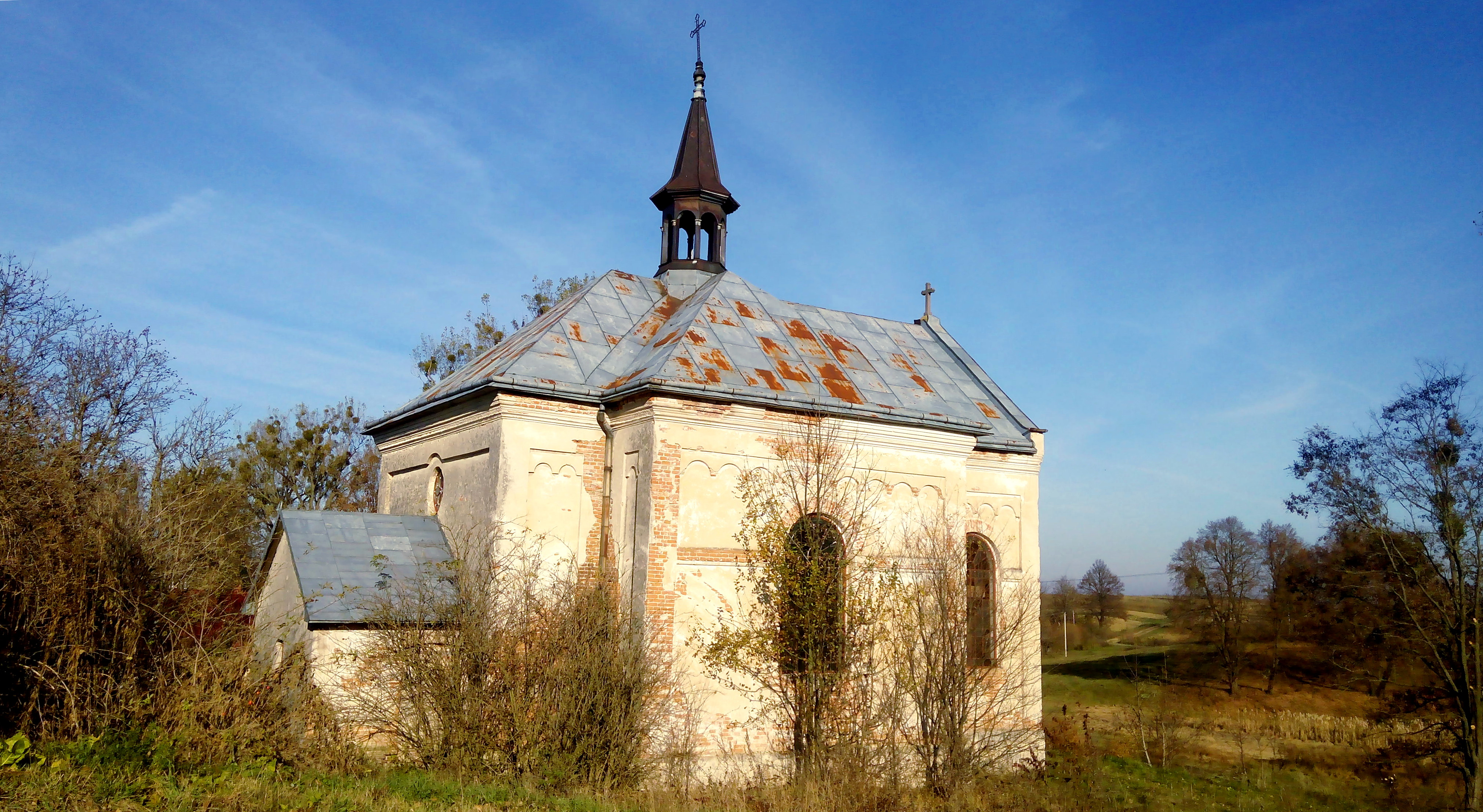
- The Chapel of a church at Lisok
- Interactive map of Lisok
- Country: Ukraine
- Oblast: Lviv
- Raion: Zolochiv
- Area: 1,709 km^{2} (660 sq mi)
- Population: 260

Lisok (Ukrainian: Лісок) is a village (selo) in Zolochiv Raion, Lviv Oblast, in western Ukraine. It belongs to Busk urban hromada, one of the hromadas of Ukraine. Lisok was established in 1021. The village has 360 inhabitants.

Until 18 July 2020, Lisok belonged to Busk Raion. The raion was abolished in July 2020 as part of the administrative reform of Ukraine, which reduced the number of raions of Lviv Oblast to seven. The area of Busk Raion was merged into Zolochiv Raion.
