= Perevolochna, Lviv Oblast =

Rural locality in Lviv Oblast, Ukraine

Coordinates: 50°3′28″N 24°47′31″E

Perevolochna
- Village
- Interactive map of Perevolochna
- Country: Ukraine
- Oblast: Lviv
- Raion: Zolochiv
- Area: 3,301 km^{2} (1,275 sq mi)
- Population: 522

Perevolochna (Ukrainian: Переволочна) is a village (selo) in Zolochiv Raion, Lviv Oblast, in western Ukraine. It belongs to Busk urban hromada, one of the hromadas of Ukraine. Perevolochna was established in 1434. The village has 522 inhabitants.

Until 18 July 2020, Perevolochna belonged to Busk Raion. The raion was abolished in July 2020 as part of the administrative reform of Ukraine, which reduced the number of raions of Lviv Oblast to seven. The area of Busk Raion was merged into Zolochiv Raion.
