= Poltva, Ukraine =

Rural locality in Lviv Oblast, Ukraine

Coordinates: 49°52′22″N 24°29′46″E

Poltva
- Village
- Interactive map of Poltva
- Country: Ukraine
- Oblast: Lviv
- Raion: Zolochiv
- Area: 13,551 km^{2} (5,232 sq mi)
- Population (2001): 930

Poltva (Ukrainian: Полтва) is a village (selo) in Zolochiv Raion, Lviv Oblast, in western Ukraine. It belongs to Krasne settlement hromada, one of the hromadas of Ukraine. Poltva was established in 1400. The village has 900 inhabitants.

Until 18 July 2020, Poltva belonged to Busk Raion. The raion was abolished in July 2020 as part of the administrative reform of Ukraine, which reduced the number of raions of Lviv Oblast to seven. The area of Busk Raion was merged into Zolochiv Raion.
