= Toporiv =

Rural locality in Lviv Oblast, Ukraine

- Village
- Топорів
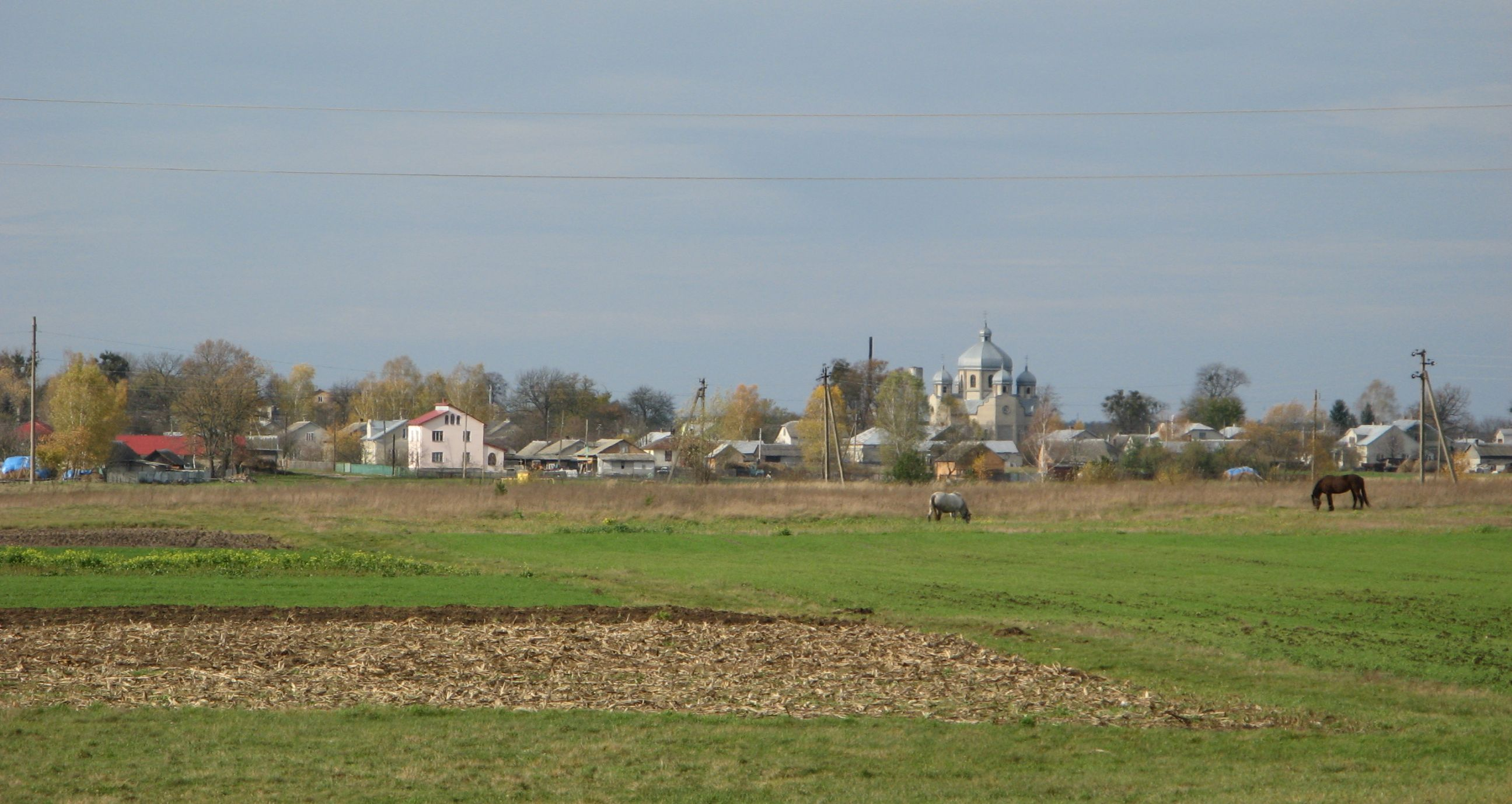
- Panorama of the central part of the village

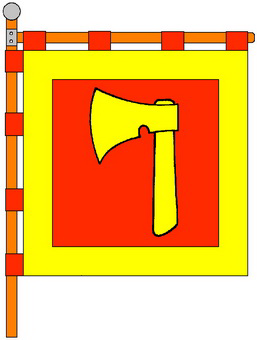
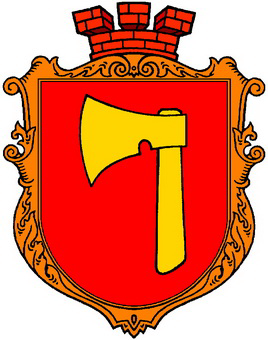
- Flag Coat of arms

- Location within Lviv Oblast Location within Ukraine
- Coordinates: 50.1072°N 24.7258°E
- Country: Ukraine
- Oblast: Lviv
- Raion: Zolochiv

Area
  - Total: 0.56 km^{2} (0.22 sq mi)

Population (2023)
  - Total: ▼1,009

Toporiv (Ukrainian: Топорів, Polish: Toporów, Yiddish: טאָפּאָראָב, romanized: Topororob) is a village (selo) in the Zolochiv Raion, Lviv Oblast, in western Ukraine. It belongs to Busk urban hromada, one of the hromadas of Ukraine. The village has 1,009 inhabitants.

== History ==
Toporiv was established in 1605.

In the interwar period, Toporów, as it was known in Polish, was administratively located in the Radziechów County in the Tarnopol Voivodeship of Poland.

Following the invasion of Poland in September 1939, Hoża was first occupied by the Soviet Union until 1941, then by Nazi Germany until 1944, and then re-occupied by the Soviet Union, which eventually annexed it from Poland in 1945. The local Polish police chief and another local Polish policeman were murdered by the Russians in the Katyn massacre in 1940.

Until 18 July 2020, Toporiv belonged to Busk Raion. The raion was abolished in July 2020 as part of the administrative reform of Ukraine, which reduced the number of raions of Lviv Oblast to seven. The area of Busk Raion was merged into Zolochiv Raion.
