= Zadviria =

Village in western Ukraine

Zadviria Задвір'я
- Village
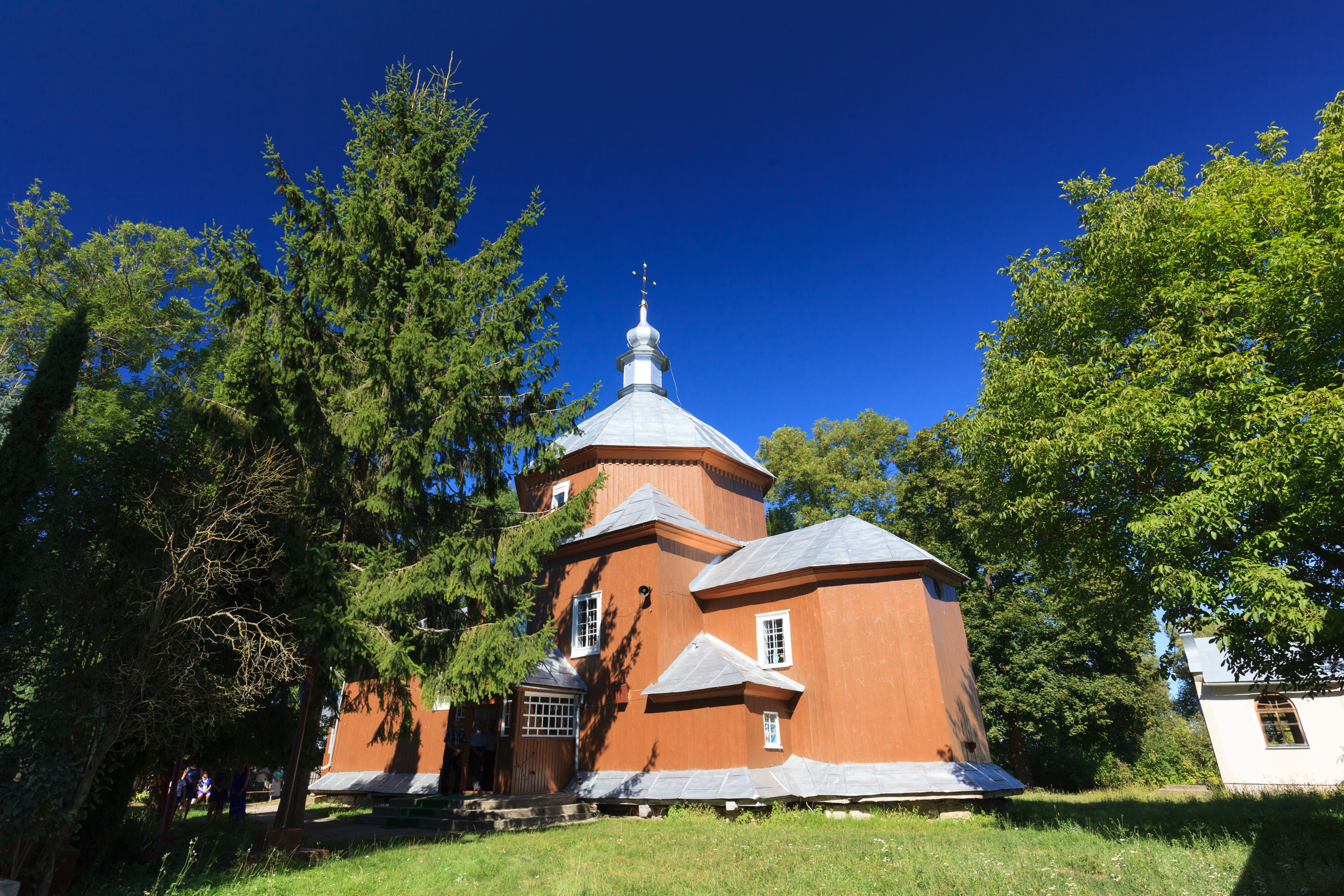
- Virgin Mary Church

- Location within Lviv Oblast Location within Ukraine
- Coordinates: 49°52′51″N 24°26′25″E
- Country: Ukraine
- Oblast: Lviv Oblast
- Raion: Zolochiv Raion
- Hromada: Krasne settlement hromada
- Established: 1451

Area
  - Total: 3,862 km^{2} (1,491 sq mi)

Population
  - Total: 1,736

Zadviria (Ukrainian: Задвір'я, Polish: Zadwórze) is a village in Western Ukraine. It is located in the Zolochiv Raion of the Lviv Oblast and belongs to Krasne hromada, one of the hromadas of Ukraine.

== History ==
The first Zadviria was mentioned in 1451.

The village was a crown land in Lwów Land of Ruthenian Voivodeship, which was administered by a nobleman Jan Kola.

== Population ==
According to the 2001 Ukrainian census the population of Zadviria was 1855 persons.

=== Language ===
Population distribution by a native language according to the 2001 Ukrainian census:

Language	Percent
Ukrainian	99,03 %
Hungarian	0,59 %
Russian	0,27 %

== Attractions ==
In the northern part of the village, there is a wooden Virgin Mary Church of the Ukrainian Greek Catholic Church. Near the main road, the abandoned Roman Catholic Virgin Mary Queen of Poland Church is located. Nowadays, there is an ongoing construction of a new All Ukrainian Saints Church.
