= Ostriv, Zolochiv Raion, Lviv Oblast =

Rural locality in Lviv Oblast, Ukraine

Coordinates: 49°55′42″N 24°35′45″E

Ostriv
- Village
- Interactive map of Ostriv
- Country: Ukraine
- Oblast: Lviv
- Raion: Zolochiv
- Area: 1,544 km^{2} (596 sq mi)
- Population (2022): ▼289

Ostriv (Ukrainian: Острів) is a village (selo) in Zolochiv Raion, Lviv Oblast, in western Ukraine. It belongs to Krasne settlement hromada, one of the hromadas of Ukraine. Ostriv was established in 1400. The village has 289 inhabitants.

Until 18 July 2020, Ostriv belonged to Busk Raion. In July 2020, the raion was eliminated as part of Ukraine's administrative reform, which brought the number of raions in Lviv Oblast down to seven. Busk Raion's territory was combined with Zolochiv Raion.

The village was the birthplace of the Ukrainian sculptor Andrii Koverko (1893–1967).
