= Statue of Andrey Sheptytsky, Lviv =

Monument in Lviv, Ukraine

Statue of Andrey Sheptytsky
- Completion date: 29 July 2015
- Type: statue
- Location: Lviv, Ukraine; 49°50′16.1″N 24°00′47.9″E

Statue of Andrey Sheptytsky (Ukrainian: Пам'ятник Андрею Шептицького) was installed in Lviv in 2015.

In the 1930s and 1940s, there were two monuments to the metropolitan in Lviv, but they were later destroyed by the Soviet authorities.

== Built in 1932 ==
According to the book "Monuments and Memorial Plaques of Lviv", it was the first Ukrainian monument in Lviv. It was made by the sculptor Andrii Koverko and in October 1932 the monument to Andrey Sheptytsky was installed in a half-open chapel in the courtyard of the Greek Catholic Theological Seminary. The monument stood until 1939, when, according to the memoirs of Josyf Slipyj, it was destroyed by the Red Army.

== Built in 1935 ==
The second Lviv monument to Andrey Sheptytsky was erected in September 1935. The year was not chosen by chance, as it coincided with the 30th anniversary of the opening of the National Museum and the 70th anniversary of its founder, Metropolitan Andrey. Events on the occasion of these dates took place in the museum itself, which was located on Mokhnatskyi Street (now Drahomanov Street). The monument was unveiled on 27 September 1935. The celebrations were attended by many representatives of the Ukrainian intelligentsia of Lviv of the time, including Ilarion Svientsitskyi, Senator Dacykiewicz, Czech Consul Mr. Chech, city mayor Mr. Protasiewicz, and vice-regimental commander Mr. Sokhanskyi.

The author of this monument was the sculptor Serhii Lytvynenko. He created a seated sculpture of the Metropolitan in the courtyard of the National Museum that accurately depicted his image. From 1940, the Soviet authorities repeatedly demanded that the monument be removed. The museum's director, Ilarion Svientsitskyi, delayed the time in every possible way and looked for various excuses to allow the sculpture to remain. The monument survived the war, but after the war, the Lviv City Council issued Resolution No. 687 ordering its immediate removal. On the night of 10 August 1947, the sculpture was removed (according to various versions, it was smashed with hammers or toppled by a cable attached to a tank) and disappeared without a trace. The monument was eventually replaced by a statue of God Svetovit from the village of Lopushanka.

== Built in 2015 ==
During the period of Ukraine's independence, the question of erecting a monument to the Metropolitan was raised many times. In 1992, a competition was held to design the monument. On November 26, the winners were announced, and the site of the monument was determined to be the square on Saint George Square. However, it was later decided that the proposed designs were too pompous and did not reflect the spiritual essence of Andrey Sheptytsky's personality.

In 2009, the curia of the Ukrainian Catholic Archeparchy of Lviv initiated the construction of the monument. The modern monument to Metropolitan Andrey is a recreation by Mykola Posikira (architects Ihor Kuzmak and Mykhailo Fedyk) with minor changes of the first monument of 1932 by Andrii Koverko. It was inaugurated on 29 July 2015. The height of the monument is 3.6 meters.

== Bibliography ==
- Мельник І., Масик Р. Пам'ятники та меморіальні таблиці міста Львова. — Львів : Апріорі, 2012. — 318 с. — (Львівські вулиці і кам'яниці) — ISBN 978-617-629-077-3.
