= Hrabova =

Rural locality in Lviv Oblast, Ukraine

Coordinates: 50°3′32″N 24°36′0″E

- Village
- Interactive map of Hrabova
- Country: Ukraine
- Oblast: Lviv
- Raion: Zolochiv
- Area: 1,437 km^{2} (555 sq mi)
- Population: 402

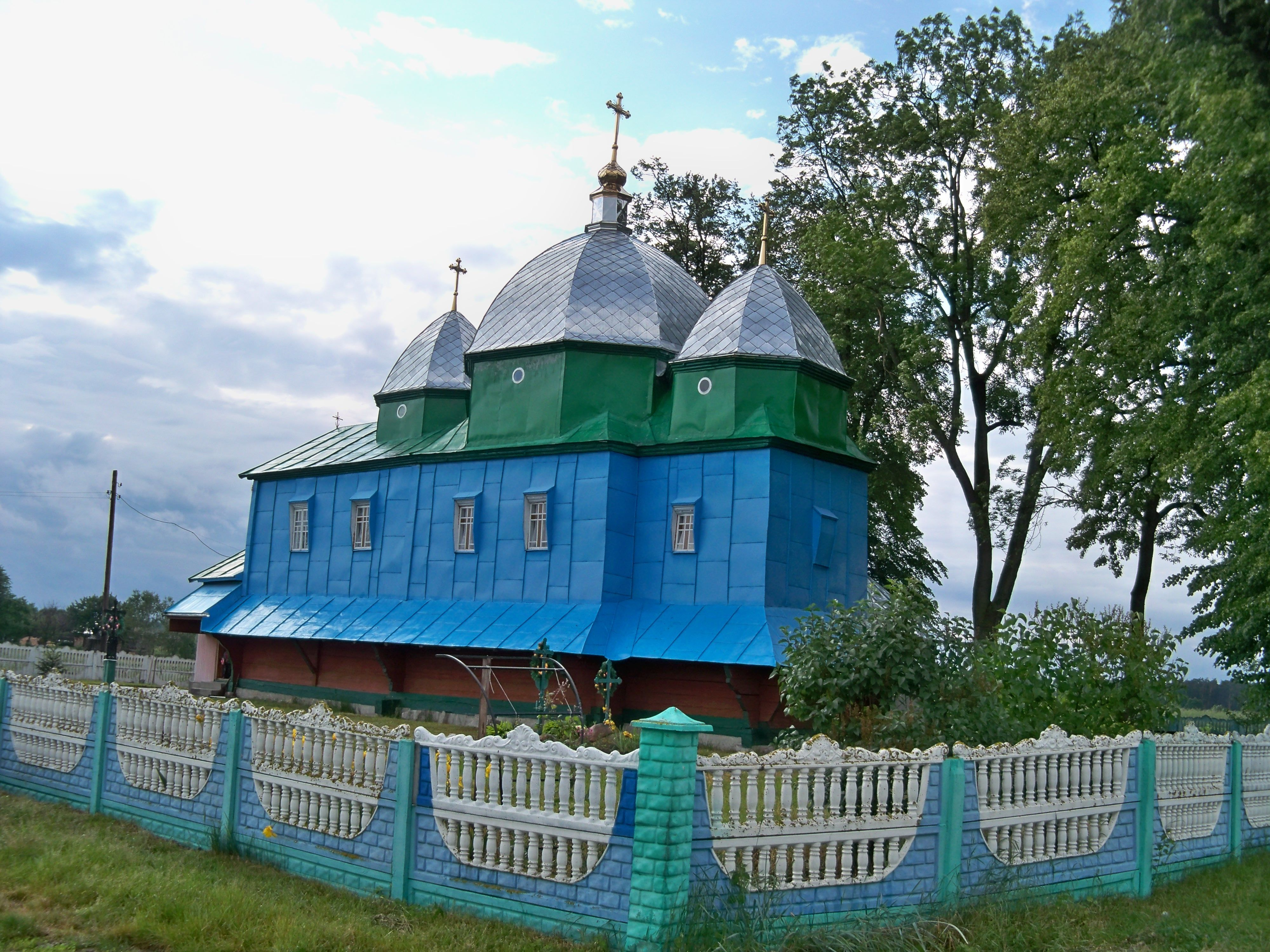
Church of the Nativity of the Virgin Mary (village), Hrabova,

Hrabova (Ukrainian: Грабова) is a village (selo) in Zolochiv Raion, Lviv Oblast, in western Ukraine. It belongs to Busk urban hromada, one of the hromadas of Ukraine. Hrabova was established in 1500. The village has 402 inhabitants.

Until 18 July 2020, Hrabova belonged to Busk Raion. The raion was abolished in July 2020 as part of the administrative reform of Ukraine, which reduced the number of raions of Lviv Oblast to seven. The area of Busk Raion was merged into Zolochiv Raion.
