= Krasne, Zolochiv Raion, Lviv Oblast =

Rural locality in Lviv Oblast, Ukraine

Krasne Красне
- Rural settlement
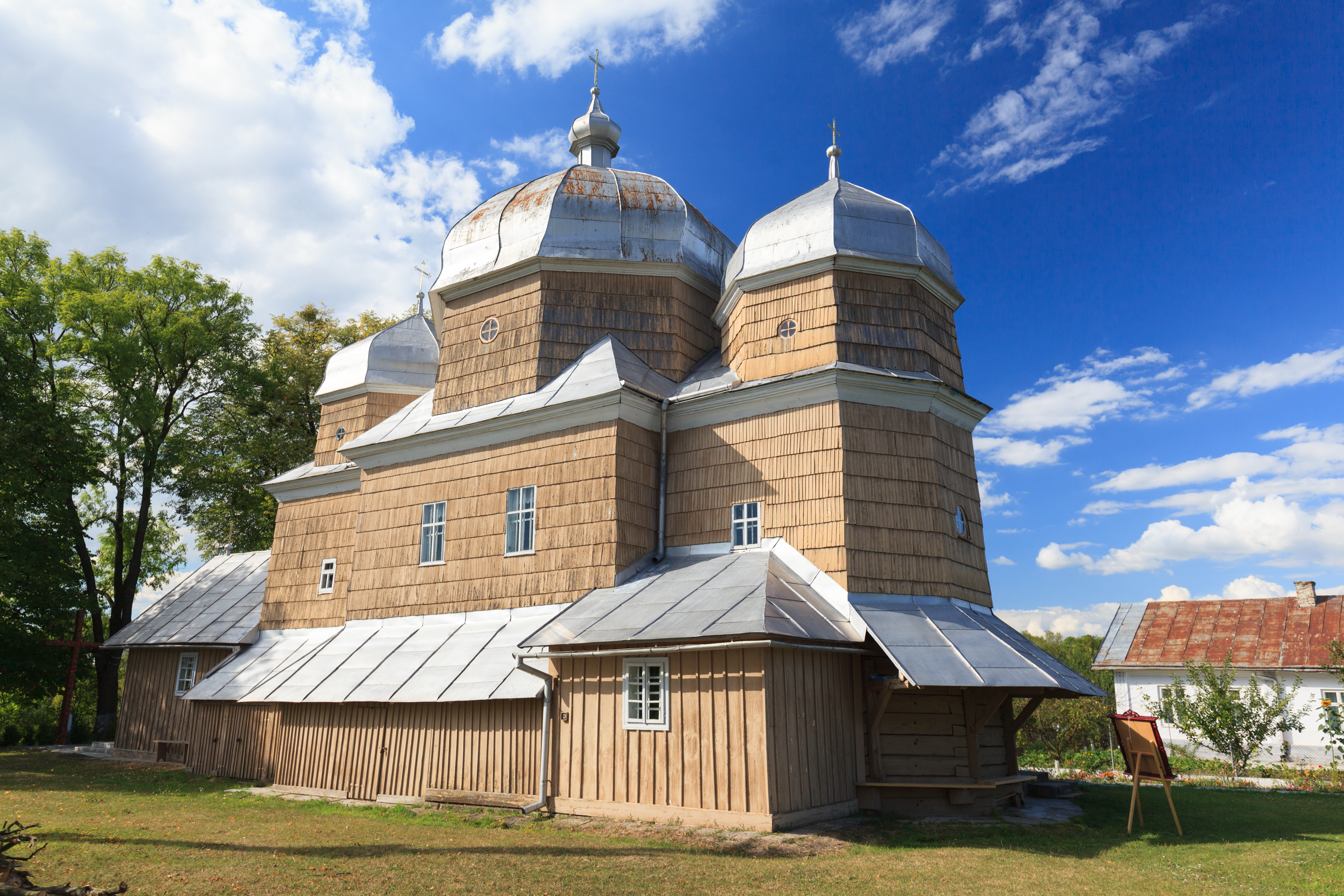
- Church of St. Elijah in Krasne

- Seal
- Interactive map of Krasne
- Location in Lviv Oblast Location in Ukraine
- Coordinates: 49°54′50″N 24°36′57″E
- Country: Ukraine
- Oblast: Lviv Oblast
- Raion: Zolochiv Raion
- Hromada: Krasne settlement hromada

Population (2022)
  - Total: 6,308
- Time zone: UTC+2 (EET)
  - Summer (DST): UTC+3 (EEST)

Krasne (Ukrainian: Красне) is a rural settlement in Zolochiv Raion, Lviv Oblast, western Ukraine. The settlement is located east of the city of Lviv, on the left bank of the Poltva, a right tributary of the Bug. It hosts the administration of Krasne settlement hromada, one of the hromadas of Ukraine. Population: 6,308 (2022 estimate).

== History ==
An air base of the Ukrainian Galician Army functioned in Krasne during the Polish-Ukrainian War of 1918-1919. Krasne was occupied and annexed into the Ukrainian Soviet Socialist Republic by the Soviet Union from the Second Polish Republic in September 1939 as part of the Soviet annexation of Eastern Galicia and Volhynia. Following the dissolution of the Soviet Union in 1991, Krasne was included in the Lviv Oblast of Ukraine.

Until 18 July 2020, Krasne belonged to Busk Raion. The raion was abolished in July 2020 as part of the administrative reform of Ukraine, which reduced the number of raions of Lviv Oblast to seven. The area of Busk Raion was merged into Zolochiv Raion.

Until 26 January 2024, Krasne was designated urban-type settlement. On this day, a new law entered into force which abolished this status, and Krasne became a rural settlement.

== Economy ==
=== Transportation ===
The settlement has access to Highway M06 connecting Lviv with Kyiv via Rivne and Zhytomyr, and to Highway M09 connecting Lviv with Ternopil.

Krasne railway station is where the railway line from Lviv branches into two, running to Rivne and to Ternopil. There is passenger traffic.

== Notable people ==
- Vasyl Kuk (1913–2007), Ukrainian nationalist activist and militant who was the last leader of the Ukrainian Insurgent Army
