= Humnyska =

Rural locality in Lviv Oblast, Ukraine

Humnyska Гумниська
- Village
- Interactive map of Humnyska
- Coordinates: 49°58′08″N 24°43′17″E
- Country: Ukraine
- Oblast: Lviv Oblast
- District: Zolochiv Raion
- Established: 1476

Area
  - Total: 2,389 km^{2} (922 sq mi)
- Elevation /(average value of): 218 m (715 ft)

Population
  - Total: 455
  - Density: 19,046/km^{2} (49,330/sq mi)
- Time zone: UTC+2 (EET)
  - Summer (DST): UTC+3 (EEST)
- Postal code: 80531
- Area code: +380 3264
- Website: село Гумниська^{(Ukrainian)}

Humnyska (Ukrainian: Гумни́ська) is a village (selo) in Zolochiv Raion, Lviv Oblast of Western Ukraine. It belongs to Busk urban hromada, one of the hromadas of Ukraine. The village covers an area of 2,389 km^{2} at an altitude of 218 metres (720 ft) above sea level. Local government is administered by Humnyska village council. A village Chuchmany is also in the structure of local government.

== Geography ==
The village is located near the highway in European route E40 E40 connecting Lviv with Kyiv. Distance to the highway is 2 kilometres (1.2 mi). And a distance from the regional center Lviv is 63 kilometres (39 mi), 10 kilometres (6.2 mi) from the district center Busk, and 481 kilometres (299 mi) from Kyiv.

== History and Culture ==
Village Humnyska, probably founded in the fifteenth century, has a record of where it was first mentioned in 1476.
Traces of Stone Age settlements (3rd millennium BC) and early Bronze Age archaeological excavations have been revealed near villages Chuchmany and Humnyska.
From 1772 the village was a part of Austrian Empire, since 1867 as part of Austro-Hungarian Empire. From 1920 to 1939 Humnyska was part of Second Polish Republic.
In 1931, a school was built in the village. The first director was Stepan Kalynevych. He led the school until 1945 and made a significant contribution to the development of education in rural areas.

Until 18 July 2020, Humnyska belonged to Busk Raion. The raion was abolished in July 2020 as part of the administrative reform of Ukraine, which reduced the number of raions of Lviv Oblast to seven. The area of Busk Raion was merged into Zolochiv Raion.

== Cult constructions and religion ==
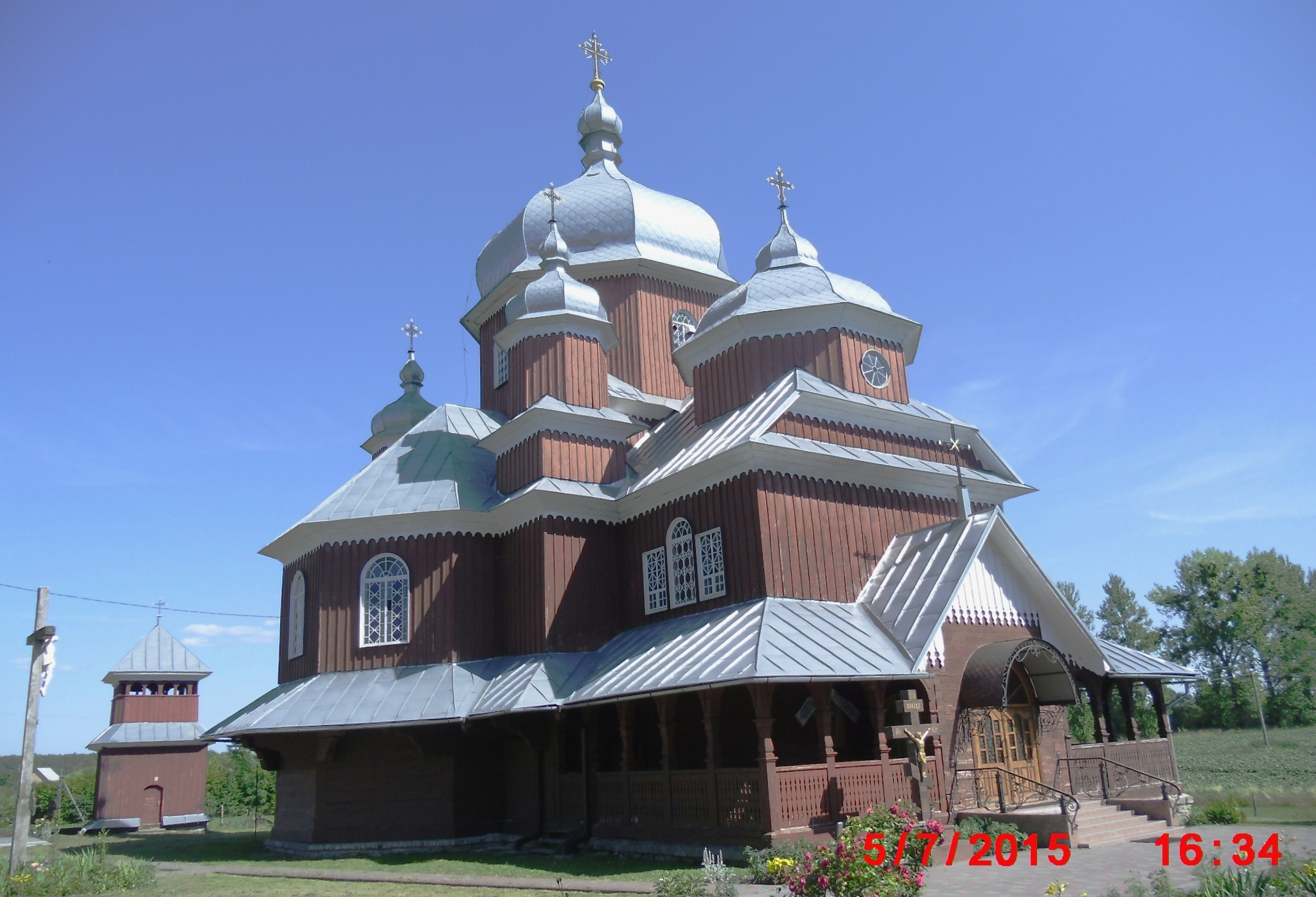
St. Archangel Michael church in Humnyska.

The first church building was built of wood in 1724. The new building was built and consecrated November 21, 1926, and it survived to the present day. This is the Church of St. Michael the Archangel. The Church is in the list of wooden churches in the Lviv region.
In 1838 Markiyan Shashkevych was a priest in the Church of St. Michael the Archangel.

== Famous people ==
- Markiyan Shashkevych – was a priest of the Ukrainian Greek-Catholic Church, a poet, a translator, and the leader of the literary revival in Right Bank Ukraine. In 1838 Markiyan Shashkevych was a priest in the Church of St. Michael the Archangel in the village Humnyska.
- Yulian Voronovskyi – was the Eparchial bishop of Ukrainian Catholic Eparchy of Sambir – Drohobych since March 30, 1994 to October 27, 2011. (born May 5, 1936 in Humnyska).
- Stepan Kalynevych – the school director from 1931 until 1945 in Humnyska.

== Literature ==
- Історія міст і сіл УРСР : Львівська область, Тершів. – К. : ГРУРЕ, 1968 р. Page 203 (in Ukrainian)
- М. Арендач. Село Плав'є: погляд крізь віки. Львів: Ініціатива, 2012–176с. Редактор Ігор Дах. (V.6. Культурний розвиток, стор. 120) (in Ukrainian)
