= Museum of Folk Architecture and Life, Uzhhorod =

Museum in Ukraine

Coordinates: 48°37′15.1″N 22°18′21.45″E

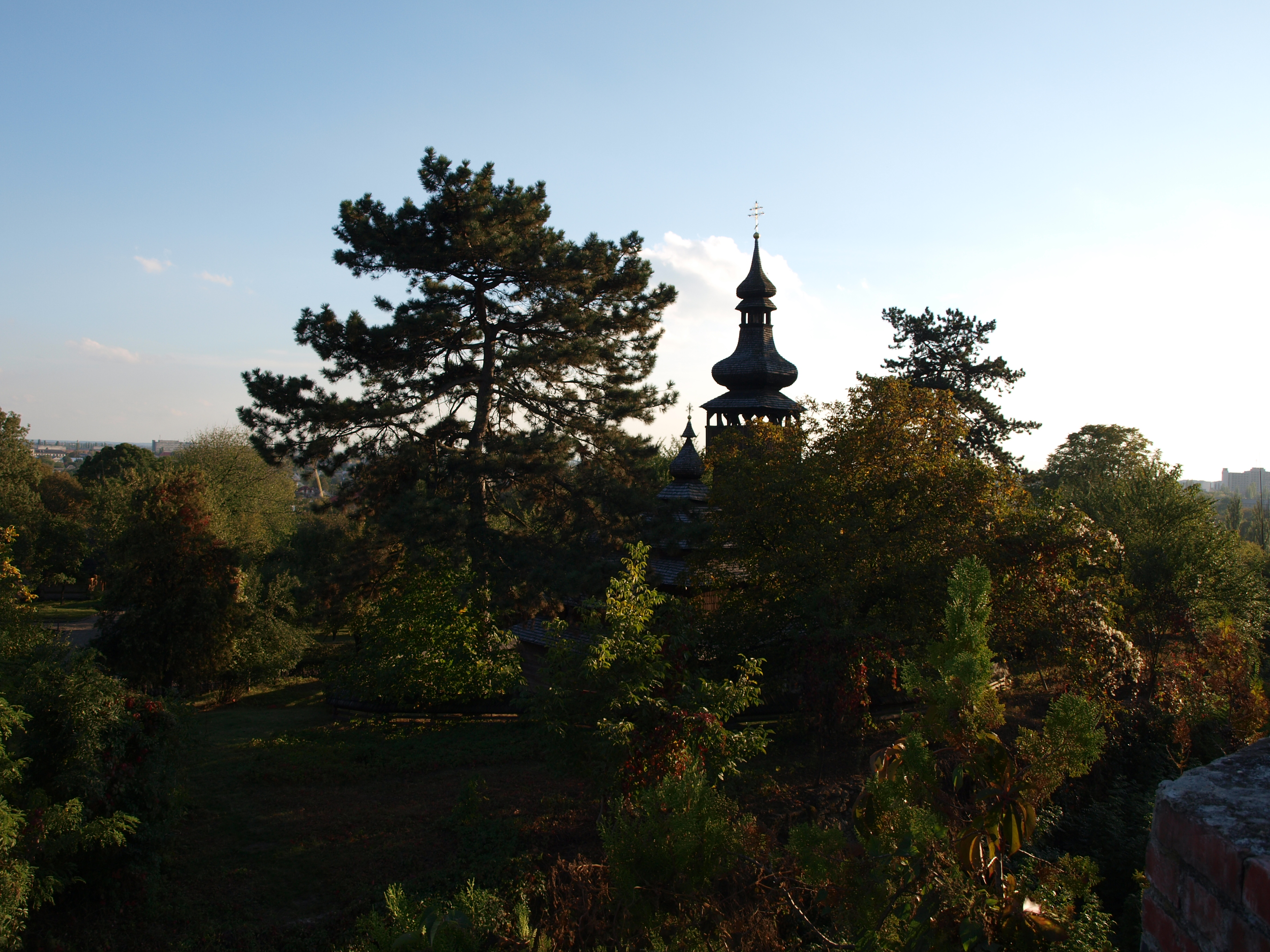
St Michael's wooden church (1777), from the Shelestove village, a classic example of folklore Lemko architecture, is a centerpiece of the museum.

The Museum of Folk Architecture and Life is an open-air museum located in Uzhhorod, Ukraine. It features over 30 traditional structures collected from villages across Zakarpattia Oblast, the Ukrainian province of which Uzhhorod is the capital. According to Michael Benanav of The New York Times, "the museum's centerpiece is 16th-century St. Michael's Church, with a roof and onion-domed steeple covered in wooden shingles."

Uzhhorod Castle, located nearby, is an imposing fortress that housed the regents of the Habsburgs.

In English, the museum may also be known as Subcarpathian Rus' Museum of Folk Architecture and Customs, Transcarpathian Museum of Folk Architecture and Customs, Uzhhorod Museum of Folk Architecture and Folkways or Uzhhorod Museum of Folk Architecture and Rural Life.

== Gallery of living spaces ==
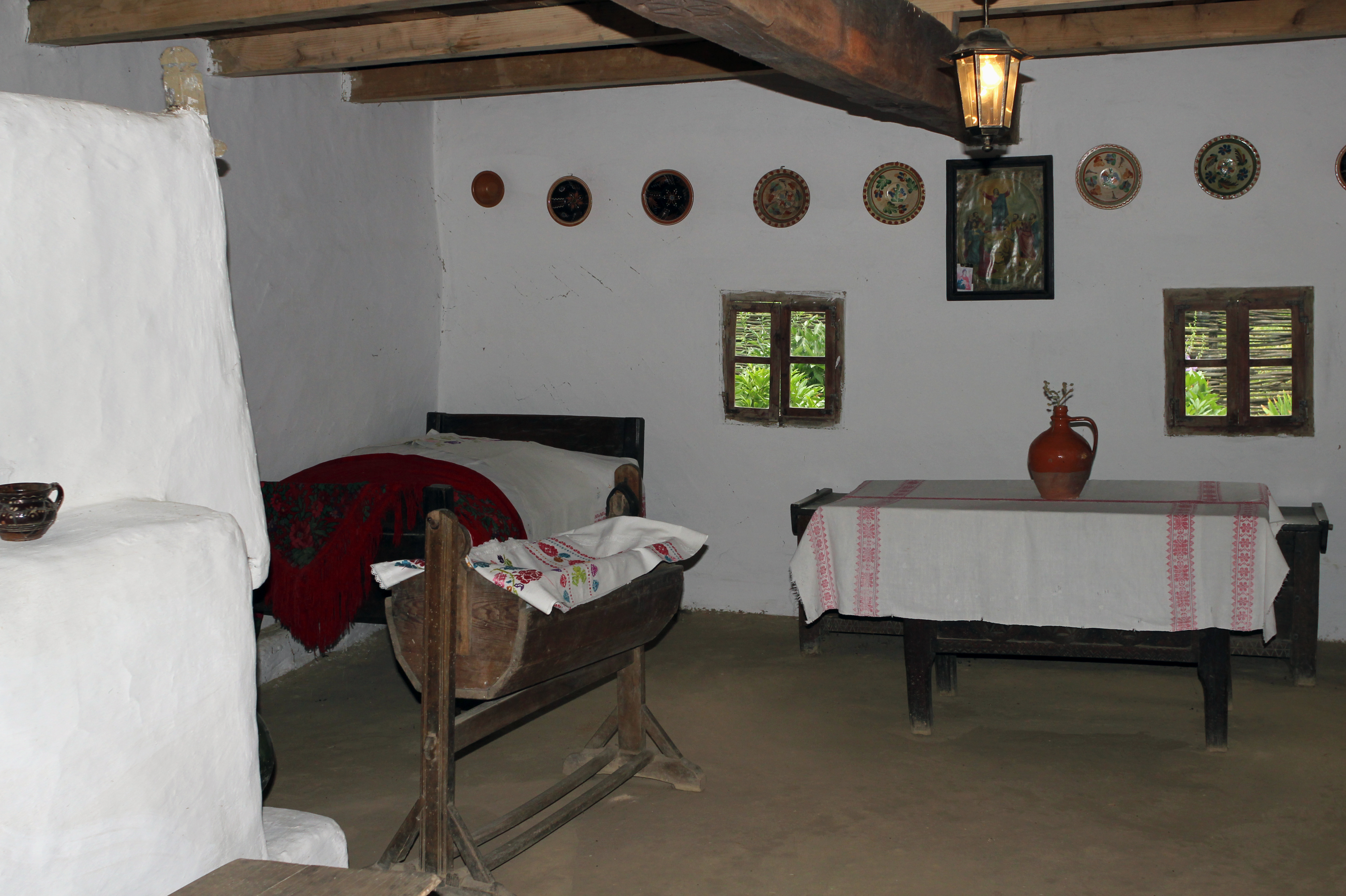

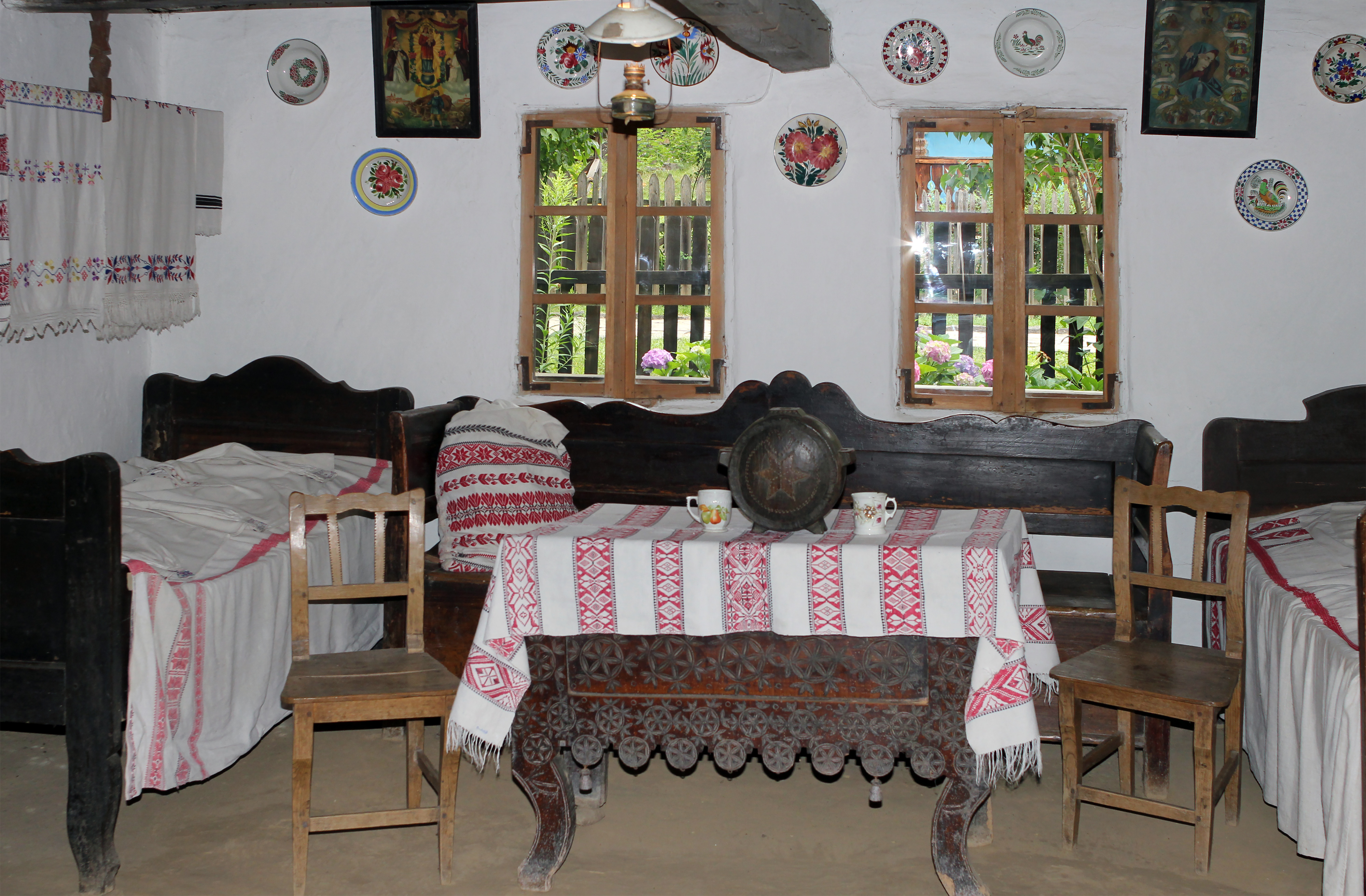

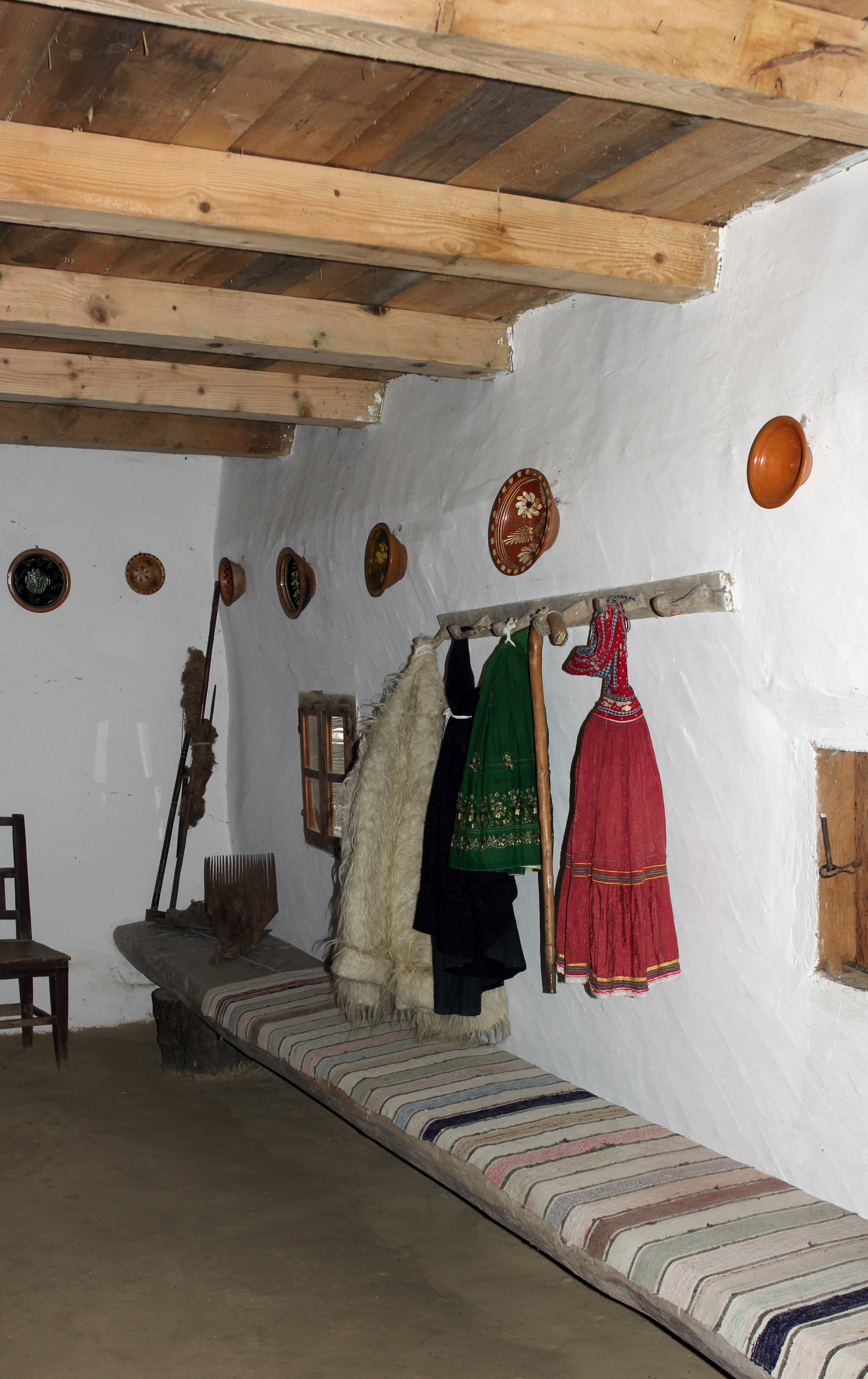

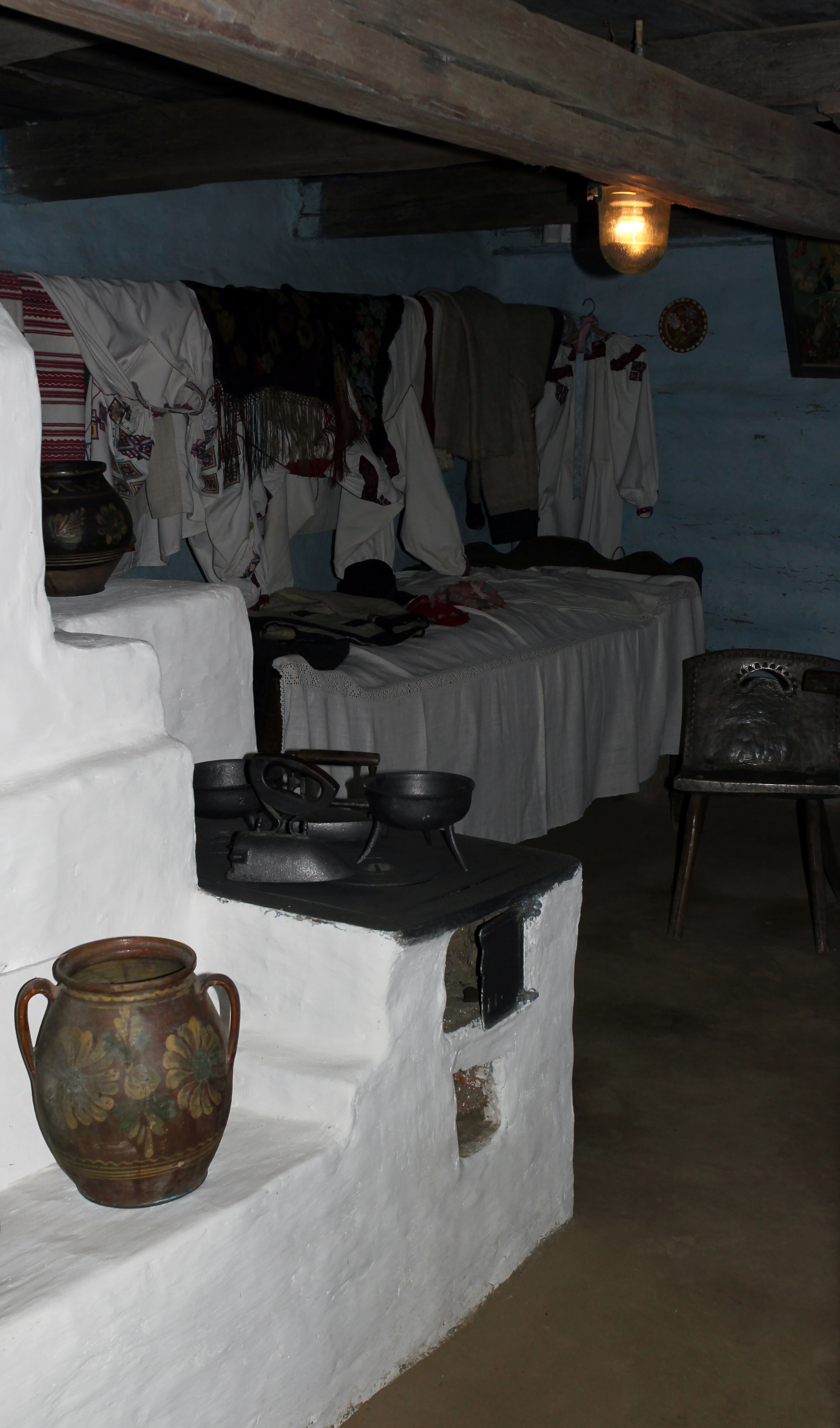

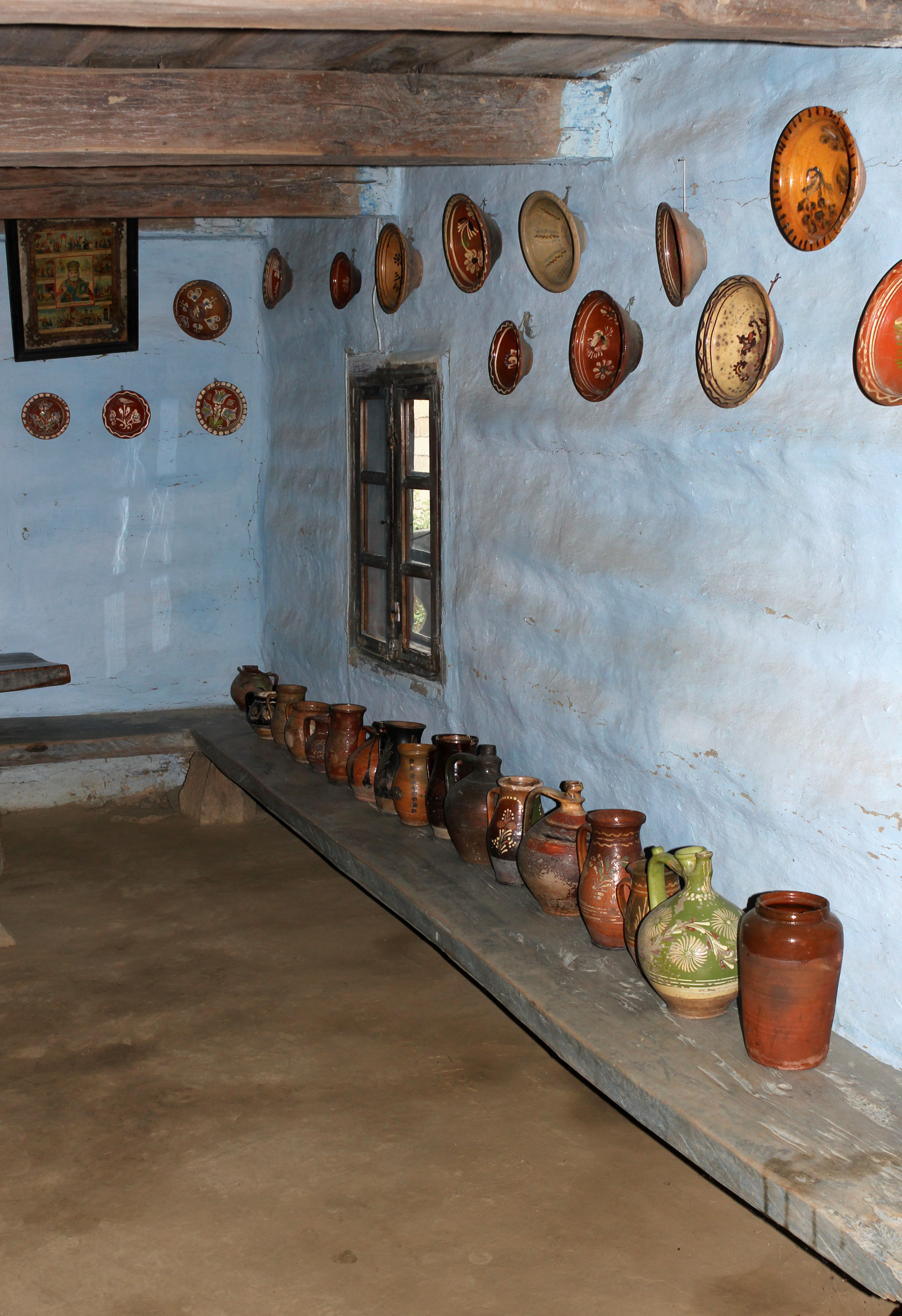

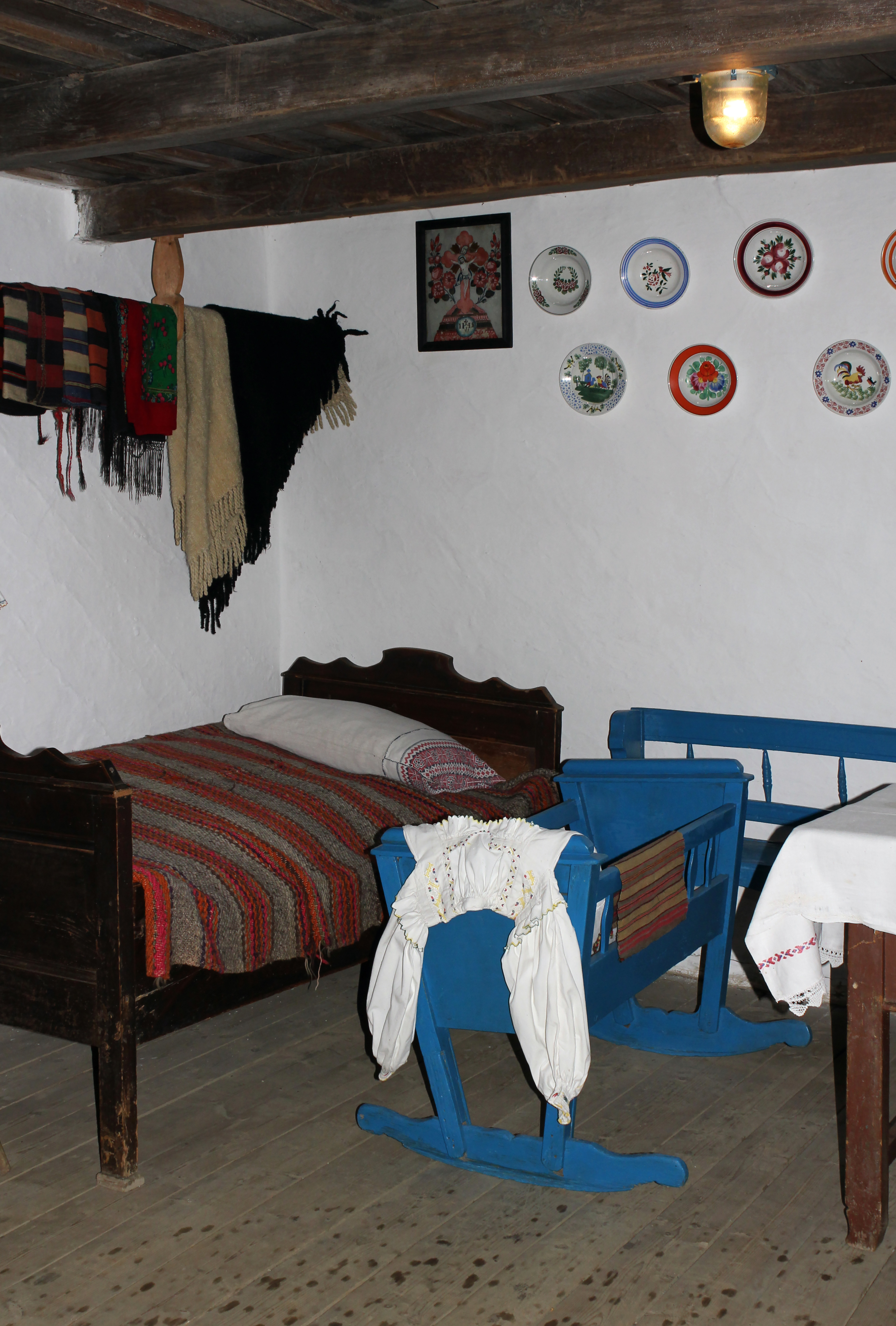

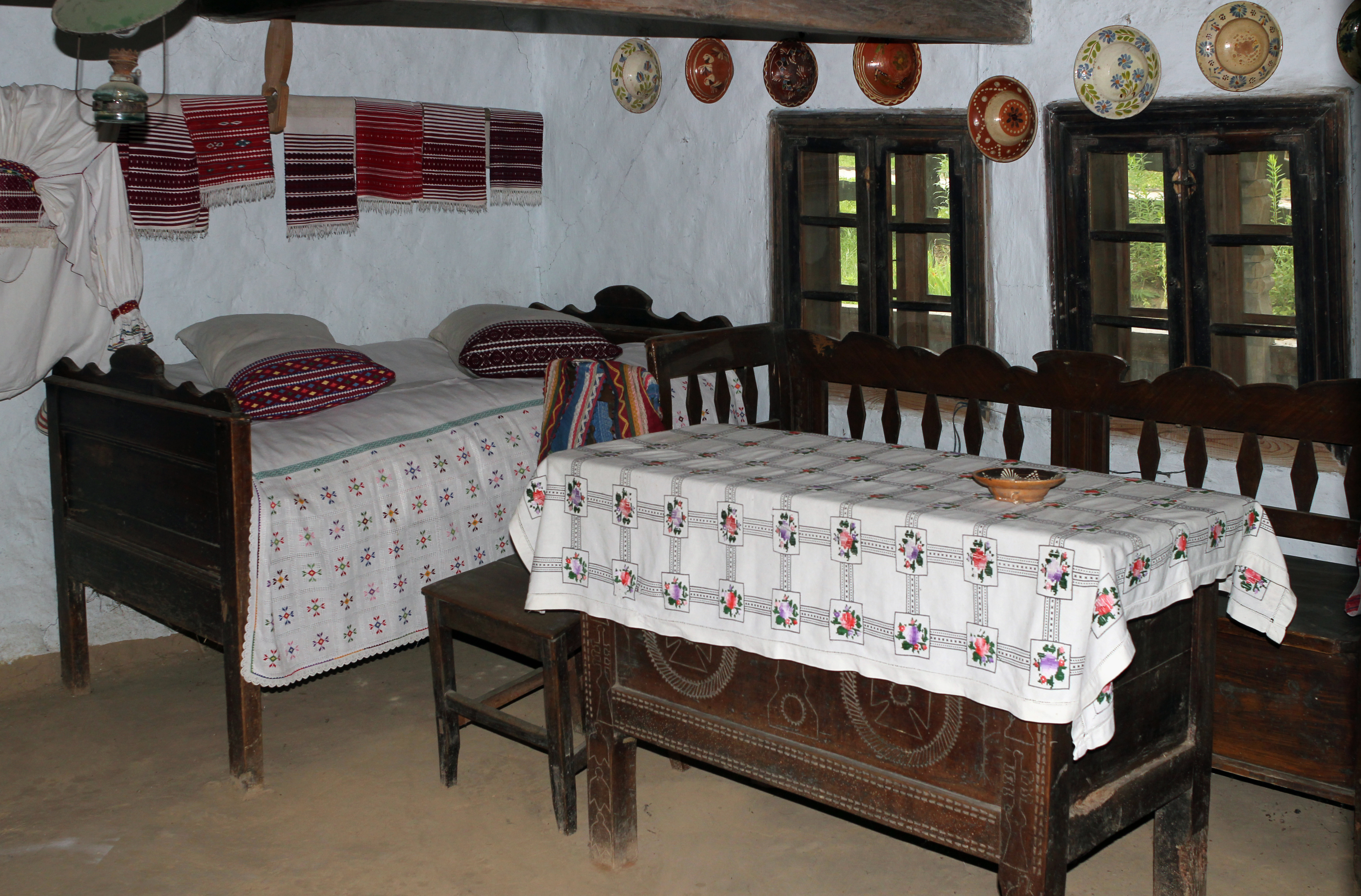

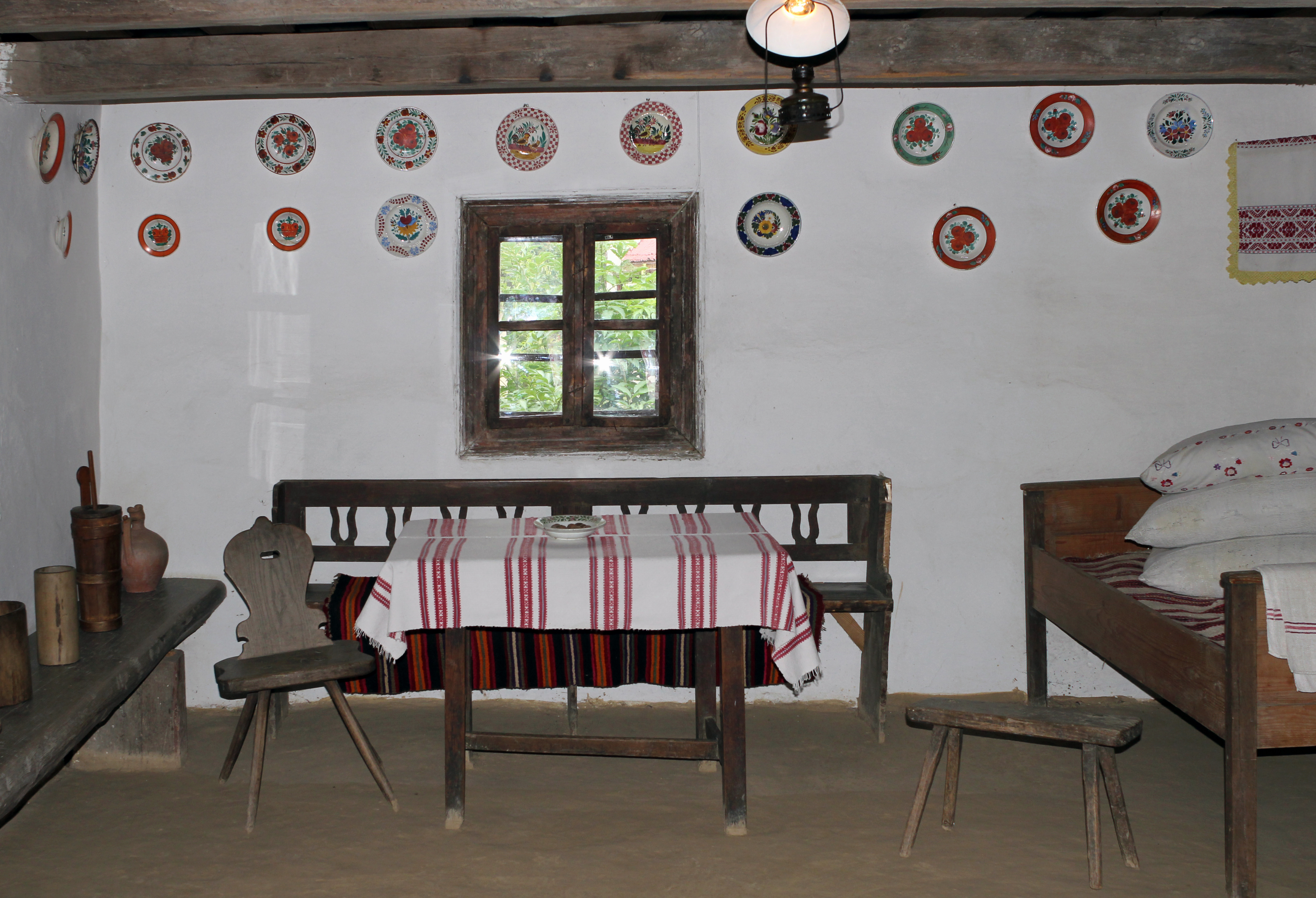
