= Busk Raion =

Former subdivision of Lviv Oblast, Ukraine

Busk Raion Буський район
- Raion
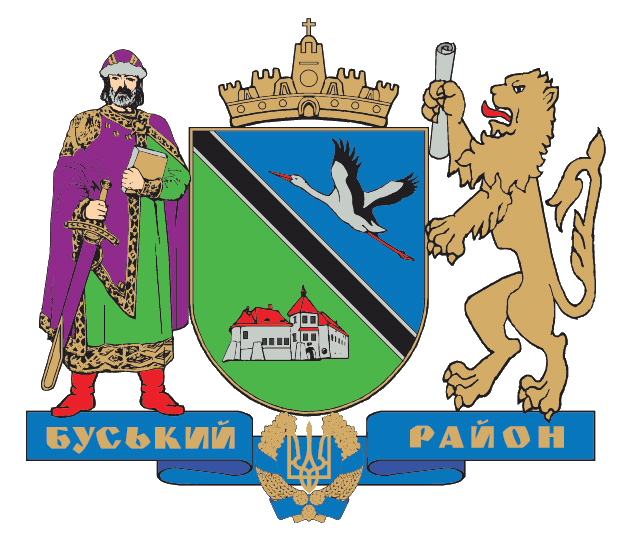
- Flag Coat of arms

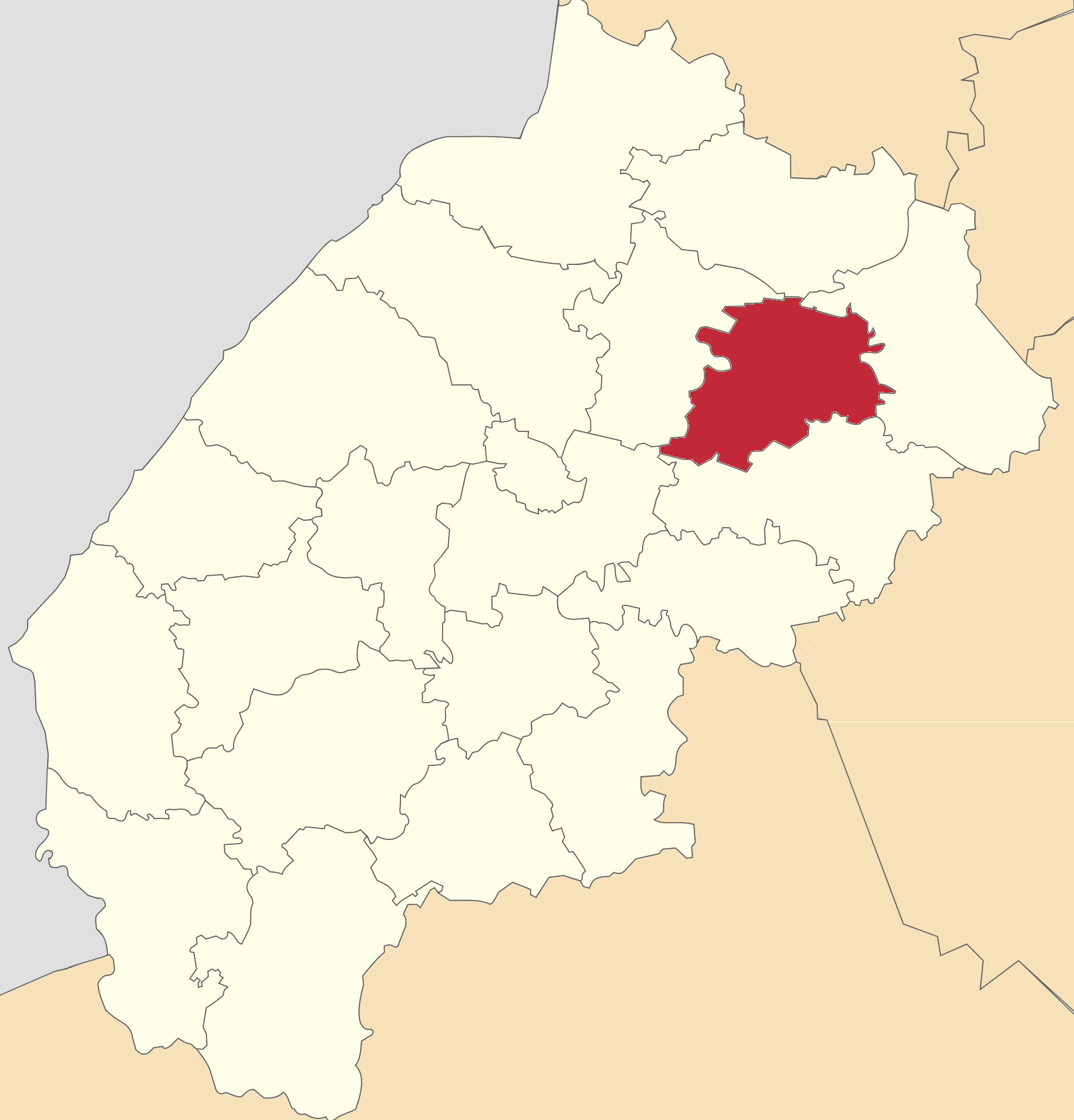
- Coordinates: 49°59′29″N 24°40′11″E
- Country: Ukraine
- Region: Lviv Oblast
- Established: 8 September 1966
- Disestablished: 18 July 2020
- Admin. center: Busk
- Subdivisions: List: — city councils; — settlement councils; — rural councils; Number of localities: — cities; — urban-type settlements; 80 — villages; — rural settlements

Area
  - Total: 856 km^{2} (331 sq mi)

Population (2020)
  - Total: 45,934
  - Density: 53.7/km^{2} (139/sq mi)
- Time zone: UTC+02:00 (EET)
  - Summer (DST): UTC+03:00 (EEST)
- Postal index: 80500—80565
- Area code: 380-3264
- Website: http://busk-rda.gov.ua/ Buskyi Raion

Busk Raion (Ukrainian: Буський район) was a raion (district) in Lviv Oblast (region) in western Ukraine. It was established in 1966. Its administrative center was the town of Busk. The raion was abolished on 18 July 2020 as part of the administrative reform of Ukraine, which reduced the number of raions of Lviv Oblast to seven. The area of Busk Raion was merged into Zolochiv Raion. The last estimate of the raion population was 45,934 (2020 est.).

== Subdivisions ==
At the time of disestablishment, the raion consisted of two hromadas:

- Busk urban hromada with the administration in Busk;
- Krasne settlement hromada with the administration in the urban-type settlement of Krasne.

== Settlements ==
The villages (selo) of the Busk Raion included:

- Bachka
- Baluchyn
- Bazhany
- Chanyzh
- Chishki
- Haivske
- Horbachi
- Hrabova
- Humnyska
- Huta
- Kuty
- Lisok
- Lisove, Chanyzka village council
- Lisove, Toporivska village council
- Ostriv
- Perevolochna
- Pidstavky
- Poltva
- Rusyliv
- Stovpyn
- Toporiv
- Turia
- Zabrid

== See also ==
- List of villages in Lviv Oblast - Busk Raion
- Olesko Castle
