= Krasne settlement hromada =

Hromada in Lviv Oblast, Ukraine

Krasne settlement hromada Красненська селищна громада
- Hromada
- Seal
- Interactive map of Krasne settlement hromada
- Country: Ukraine
- Oblast: Lviv Oblast
- Raion: Zolochiv Raion
- Admin. center: Krasne

Area
  - Total: 2,157 km^{2} (833 sq mi)

Population (2021)
  - Total: 16,951
  - Density: 7.859/km^{2} (20.35/sq mi)
- CATOTTG code: UA46040090000012087
- Settlements: 18
- Rural settlements: 1
- Villages: 17
- Website: krasne-rada.gov.ua

Krasne settlement hromada (Ukrainian: Красненська селищна громада) is a hromada in Ukraine, in Zolochiv Raion of Lviv Oblast. The administrative center is the rural settlement of Krasne.

== Settlements ==
The hromada consists of 1 rural settlement (Krasne) and 17 villages:

- Andriivka
- Baluchyn
- Bezbrody
- Bohdanivka
- Bortkiv
- Zadviria
- Kutkir
- Mala Vilshanka
- Ostriv
- Ostrivchyk-Pylnyi
- Petrychi
- Polonychi
- Poltva
- Rusyliv
- Sknyliv
- Storonybaby
- Utishkiv
