= Busk urban hromada =

Hromada in Lviv Oblast, Ukraine

Busk urban hromada Буська міська громада
- Hromada
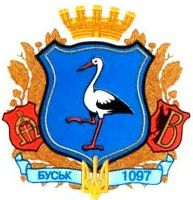
- Seal
- Interactive map of Busk urban hromada
- Country: Ukraine
- Oblast: Lviv Oblast
- Raion: Zolochiv Raion
- Admin. center: Busk

Area
  - Total: 670.4 km^{2} (258.8 sq mi)

Population (2020)
  - Total: 30,102
  - Density: 44.90/km^{2} (116.3/sq mi)
- Settlements: 68
- Cities: 1
- Rural settlements: 1
- Villages: 66
- Website: busk-miskrada.gov.ua

Busk urban hromada (Ukrainian: Буська міська громада) is a hromada in Ukraine, in Zolochiv Raion of Lviv Oblast. The administrative center is the city of Busk.

== Settlements ==
The hromada consists of 1 city (Busk), 1 rural settlement (Olesko) and 66 villages:

- Bazhany
- Baimaky
- Bachka
- Bolozhyniv
- Brakhivka
- Budyholosh
- Verbliany
- Volytsia-Derevlianska
- Voluiky
- Haivske
- Horbachi
- Hrabyna
- Hrabova
- Humnyska
- Huta
- Hutysko-Turianske
- Dumnytsia
- Duniv
- Zhuratyn
- Zabolotne
- Zaboloto
- Zabrid
- Zavodske
- Zakomaria
- Zastavie
- Yosypivka
- Kizliv
- Kudyriavtsi
- Kupche
- Kuty
- Labach
- Lanerivka
- Lenkiv
- Lisove
- Lisove
- Lisove
- Lisok
- Marashchanka
- Nyvy
- Novyi Myliatyn
- Novyi Ripniv
- Novosilky
- Ozhydiv
- Pavlyky
- Perevolochna
- Pidstavky
- Pobuzhany
- Rakobovty
- Ryzhany
- Ripniv
- Rokytne
- Sydory
- Sokolivka
- Sokolia
- Staryi Myliatyn
- Stovpyn
- Terebezhi
- Toporiv
- Turia
- Khvativ
- Tsykiv
- Chanyzh
- Chyshky
- Chuchmany
- Yablunivka
- Yanhelivka
