= Battles of Narol =

Armed clashes in 1944

Battle of Narol
- Part of Polish–Ukrainian ethnic conflict in the World War II
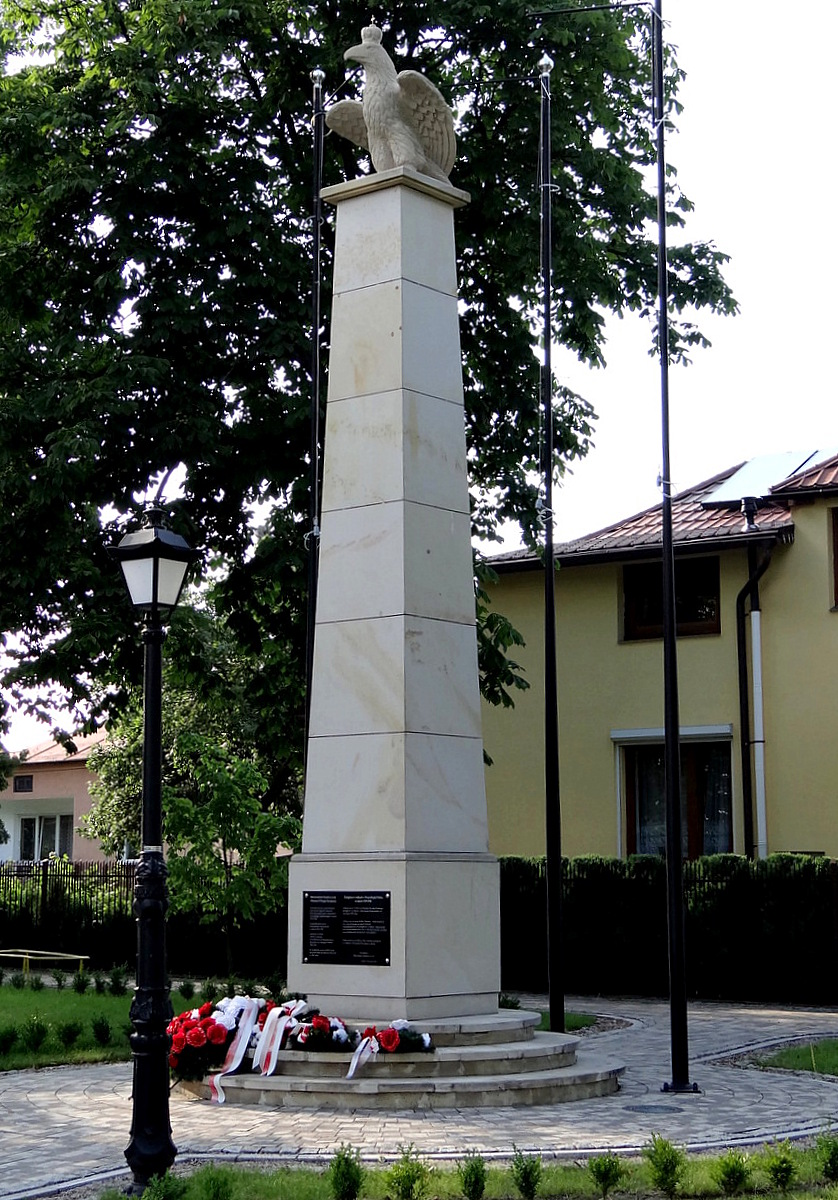
- Monument of fallen soldiers at Narol
Date	May—June 1944
Location	Narol, Subcarpathian Voivodeship, Poland
Result	Polish victory

Belligerents
Home Army; Peasant Battalions	Ukrainian Insurgent Army: (Ukraine) USN

Commanders and leaders
Karol Kostecki "Kostek"; Zdzisław Zatheya; Marian Warda; Władysław Surowiec; Julian Bistron	Ivan Szpontak "Zalizniak"

Strength
First attack: 370 AK & BCh partisans. Other battles: Unknown	First attack: 1 200 UPA & USN members. Other battles: 1500 people

Casualties and losses
First attack: 13 killed 25 wounded Other battles: Unknown	First attack: 80 killed and wounded 2 captured Other battles: Heavy
- Dozens of ethnic Polish civilians killed

The Battles of Narol are a series of armed battles fought over the town of Narol, Poland, and for control of the Narol region between the Home Army supported by Peasant Battalions and the Ukrainian insurgent army during the period May to June 1944.

== Genesis ==
As a result of the conquest by the Third Reich of the entire area of today's Lubaczów County, which was divided between the Third Reich and the Soviet Union in the years 1939–1941, three different districts of the Home Army (Krakowski, Lwowski and Lubelski) began to clash in this area, which forced the creation of new structures of the Home Army in this region. At the turn of 1942 and 1943, a new underground outpost called "Lusia" was established, with Zdzisław Zathey as its commander. In April 1944, the newly established outpost became part of the structures of the Home Army District in Lwów and changed its rank to a district, which was to co-create partisan units around Lwów, carry out diversions against the occupying forces and stop the UPA's armed actions during the ongoing Volhynian massacre. As part of this, the outpost was obliged to create a Partisan Detachment of the 4th. company of the 19th IR for the defence of Lwów, which was to proceed to the vicinity of the village of Prussia. The action, by being forced to march through areas under the control of the Ukrainian Insurgent Army (UPA) and German military training grounds, was called off, and the unit joined the "Narol" company in the Tomaszów district of the AK to fight against the UPA and USN, which posed a great threat to the Polish population in the area. At the end of April 1944, the company's soldiers were divided into two groups, which went to Narol where the Lubaczów campaign was reorganised.

== Situation before the battles ==
=== Ukrainian Raids on the Narol Area in April 1944 ===
From April 1944, the Narol area was regularly plagued by attacks by Ukrainian nationalists. One of the first such attacks took place on the night of 4–5 April in Huta Lubycka. On the night of 4–5 April 1944, nationalists of the Ukrainian Insurgent Army (UPA) came to Huta Lubycka with the intention of eliminating young Poles suspected of being members of the Home Army (AK). Two people were shot dead as a result of the attack. The Ukrainian attackers surrounded and threw grenades at a Polish house standing on the outskirts of the village, where local Poles who feared a Ukrainian attack had been gathering for the night for some time. About 20 people took shelter in a brick cellar outside the building and thus survived the attack, despite the destruction of the house.

On the morning of 5 April 1944, leaflets of the Ukrainian nationalists appeared in Huta Lubycka, Wola Wielka, Pawliszcze and other surrounding villages where Polish families or mixed families lived. These leaflets ordered Poles to leave these areas within two days, threatening death for not obeying the order. The majority of Poles left, leaving only individuals, mainly women of Greek Catholic faith from mixed families. These attacks were part of a broader strategy by Ukrainian armed formations to remove the Polish population from areas also inhabited by Ukrainians. The consequences of these actions were tragic, leading to a significant reduction in the number of Poles in the region. The effectiveness of Polish self-defence created a false sense of security that could lead to surprise in the face of a massive attack

=== Escalation of the Conflict in the Narol Region in April 1944 ===
In April 1944, Ukrainian nationalists from the village of Pawliszcze carried out a sudden machine gun fire on the neighbouring Polish village of Bieniaszówka. The attack was repeated the following day, with Ukrainians posting leaflets similar in content to those of a few days earlier, calling on Poles to leave the area under threat of death. In response to these attacks, on 7 April 1944, soldiers of the "Narol" company set fire to the Ukrainian hamlet of Krupy, which belonged to the village of Pawliszcze. On 10 April, soldiers from the Łukawica outpost fired on Huta Lubycka, which led to the burning of one cottage and the death of one person. After the Ukrainians opened fire from a heavy machine-gun, the Poles were forced to withdraw.

In the following days there were sporadic exchanges of fire between patrols of both sides. Ukrainian assaults were relatively easily repulsed by Polish self-defences from advanced outposts in Brzeziny Bełżeckie, Jędrzejówka, Łukawica and Bieniaszówka. These effective defences helped to lull the Polish defences to vigilance on the eve of the major Ukrainian attack. The assaults and corresponding retaliatory actions further exacerbated the conflict in the region. The effectiveness of Polish self-defences created a false sense of security that could lead to surprise in the face of a massive attack.

== Battles ==
=== First Battle of Narol : 21-22 may 1944 ===
A Ukrainian report described the actions of UPA-men under the command of "Jastrub", who broke into Jędrzejówka during the offensive, setting fire to several buildings. Heavily shelled from behind, presumably from the hamlet of Michalec, they were forced to retreat. At the same time, Polish units of the Home Army (AK) attacked the headquarters of the UPA Company "Siromanciw". The attacking AK soldiers were repulsed by machine gun fire. The Ukrainians renewed their attacks on Jędrzejówka twice, even reaching the centre of the village, but each time they were repulsed by the defenders. After about three to four hours of fighting, the "Siromanciw" unit, losing three dead and ten wounded, began to retreat. UPA attackers took only the wounded, leaving the fallen at the site of the battle.

The Polish units continued the pursuit of the "Jastruba" unit through Icków (Jacks) Ogród, reaching Huta Złomy and the outskirts of Łówcza. There the Ukrainians managed to prepare to repel the Polish counterattack. During the retreat, the "Jastrub" unit repulsed enemy attacks three times. The fighting in the area ended at noon. According to Ukrainian data, the village of Jędrzejówka was destroyed in 70%, and losses among the enemy, mainly Polish population, were estimated at no less than 60 armed persons.

Then the UPA Company "Yevshan" joined the fighting. The partisans, after mortar shelling of Lipsko, Narol and Jędrzejówka, broke into Lipsko under cover of rifle fire and machine guns. They quickly captured the centre of the village and, burning more buildings, reached the northern part of the town. Lipsko was destroyed in 80%. After two hours, the advance of the "Halajda" unit collapsed due to the unfavourable terrain and heavy fire from the Polish defenders. The Ukrainians retreated towards Wola Wielka. The Poles proceeded in pursuit, harassing "Yevshan's" UPA-men as far as Wola Wielka. During the retreat, the Ukrainians burnt down the farmstead of Maurycówka, Pizuny, Pawelce and partially Icków (Jacks) Ogród and Brzezinki. According to Ukrainian sources, the "Halajda" unit was said to have killed more than 40 opponents with minor losses of its own - two slightly wounded.

In order to stretch the Polish defence, the main assault on Jędrzejówka and Lipsko was supported by an attack from Wola Wielka on Łukawica, a key outpost in the Narol defence system commanded by Stanisław Pawelec "Burza". The outpost was reinforced by two subunits of the "Lusia" company, commanded by Michal Farnus "Sicinski". Ukrainian reconnaissance did not report on these reinforcements, reporting only on the concentration of Polish forces in Jędrzejówka and Michalec. The Ukrainians also launched offensive actions near Majdan and Chlewiaki and a sham attack in the Bełżec area. The clash for the outpost of Łukawica lasted the longest. The soldiers, after receiving reinforcements, launched a counterattack in the direction of Wola Wielka, but were stopped by the Ukrainians with fire from grenade launchers and were forced to retreat at around 14:00. At the request of "Kostek", the defenders were helped by reinforcements sent by commander "Polakowski". These were two companies of Region V: "Susiec" Witold Kopcia "Ligoty" and "Majdan Sopocki" by Antoni Kusiak "Bystry", as well as two subunits from the "Cieszanów" company of Franciszek Szajowski "Kruk". Their task was to secure the rear of the units fighting the Ukrainian Insurgent Army. The reinforcements arrived when the subunits of the "Narol" and "Lusia" companies moved to chase the retreating UPA sotnias. The Polish soldiers were joined by local peasants, armed with axes and scythe.

On May 21, after repelling the Ukrainian offensive on Narol, AK units carried out immediate retaliatory actions on Basiówka and Lubliniec Nowy. During these actions, at least 12 Ukrainians were killed and several others were wounded.

The resolute defence of Narol and the surrounding area prevented the Ukrainian Insurgent Army from striking Tomaszów Lubelski (if such a plan was ever considered by the Ukrainians, as the direct aim of the attack on Narol was to open a corridor to the Solska Forest and divide the Polish defence into two parts.

=== Battles in June 1944 ===
In the first days of June 1944, near Narol, the Ukrainian Insurgent Army (UPA) attacked the "Lusia" company from Lubaczów. The soldiers of this company manned an outpost in Majdan and Chlewiska. After the experience of 21 May, when the UPA easily approached Lipsko, the attacking Ukrainians most likely intended to repeat this manoeuvre. In the initial phase of the battle, a Polish soldier from the advanced lookout was killed, followed by an exchange of fire for over an hour with the entire Lubaczow company. Before the subunits of the "Narol" company arrived with relief from Kadlubiska and Narol, the UPA-men retreated to their starting positions in Kołajce and Pawliszcze.

The Ukrainian Insurgent Army again unsuccessfully attacked Narol on 4 June where the defenders inflicted heavy losses on them and repulsed the attack.

According to the account of a soldier from the "Narol" company, Stanislaw Woloszyn "Wolf", it appears that in response to the Ukrainian attack, soldiers from the Brzeziny Bełżeckie outpost surrounded and burnt down Kołajce. After "Wrzos"'s men withdrew, several AK soldiers from the Łukawica outpost entered the burning village and threw grenades at the unoccupied Ukrainian buildings. At the same time, the "Lusia" company attacked and set fire to Pawliszcze. According to Ukrainian documents, on the night of 5-6 June, Poles burnt down the villages of Kolajce and Pawliszcze, killing four civilians. The next day, 6 June, AK soldiers attacked Płazów, where they killed nine Ukrainians. Further attacks occurred in the following days.

In retaliation for these attacks, on 16 June on the Bełżec-Rawa Ruska railway section near the village of Zatyle, a 20-strong Ukrainian subunit stopped a passenger train and selected the passengers. The Ukrainians murdered 40 Poles and wounded four others. Among those killed was a Volksdeutsch from Tomaszów Lubelski. Three women managed to escape.

The next day the train was stopped again in the same place, but this time there was no tragedy. The UPA made its last attempt to attack Polish centres near Narol on 20 June, but the Ukrainian nationalists were forced to withdraw by Wehrmacht units stationed in Narol and Lipsko in connection with the counter-partisan operation "Sturmwind II". The Germans captured two UPA-men who testified that there were 1,500 UPA-men armed with 50 machine guns in the forests behind Wola Wielka.

== Losses and number of troops and commanders ==
The number of soldiers on the Polish side is unknown. It is estimated that the losses among the Polish partisans amounted to 13 dead and 25 wounded. Dozens of Polish civilians also lost their lives as a result of the UPA attack. On the Ukrainian side, losses amounted to 80 killed and wounded 2 UPA-men were taken into Polish captivity. In the second attack, the numbers and losses of both sides are unknown.

The defence of the Narol area was commanded by Karol Kostecki a.k.a. "Kostek", commander of a combined company of the Home Army and Peasant Battalions together with Marian Warda (a.k.a. "Polakowski"), commander of District V - AK Susiec. In this area, there was also the deputy commander of the Tomaszów Lubelski Home Army district - Władysław Surowiec, pseud. "Sosna", from Bełżec. In the vicinity of Majdan and Maurycówka a Cieszanów company under the command of Julian Bistroń, pseud. "Godziemba", was stationed, also supplying the outposts in Jędrzejówka and Łukawica. Thanks to a self-sacrificing armed struggle, the attackers were driven out of Lipsko, Jędrzejówka and Łukawica.And UPA forces were commanded by Ivan Szpotnak a.k.a. "Zalizniak"
