= Battle of Narol (1672) =

- Part of the Polish–Ottoman War (1672–1676) and Jan Sobieski's expedition against the Tatar chambuls
Date	6 October 1672
Location	Narol, Poland
Result	Polish-Lithuanian victory

Belligerents
Polish-Lithuanian Commonwealth	Crimean Khanate

Commanders and leaders
John III Sobieski; Krzysztof Łasko	Dżambet-Gireja

Casualties and losses
Unknown	Many drowned several captured

The Battle of Narol took place on 6 October 1672, during the Polish-Ottoman War (1672-1676). It was part of Jan III Sobieski’s autumn expedition, aimed at destruction of mounted Tatar units, which plundered southeastern provinces of the Polish–Lithuanian Commonwealth.

== Battle ==
On October 6, 2 Tatar chambuls returning from Goraj attacked Narol. The city was burned and plundered, and its inhabitants taken prisoner. Sobieski advanced on the burning Narol and attacked the 2 recurring chambuls.

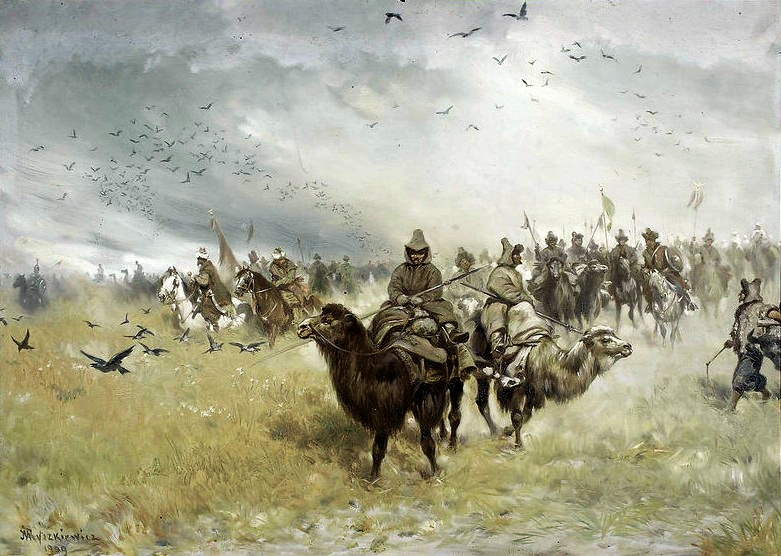
The painting by Józef Ryszkiewicz, depicting the chambul.

Krzysztof Łasko struck the Tatars first. Taken by surprise, the Tatars did not put up long resistance. The army pursued the fleeing Tatars until nightfall. Many Tatars drowned in the Tanew River. They were saved from complete annihilation by the dark night and dense forests. They fled blindly, some retreating back toward Zwierzyniec. The path was strewn with corpses for two Podolia miles. two thousand noblewomen, children, peasants and cattle were freed from Tatar captivity. The army he won many bachmats. Several dozen Tatars were taken prisoner.

== Aftermath ==
The army spent the night Narol for 3 or 4 hours. At midnight, Sobieski set off on his further expedition.

== See also ==
- Battles for Narol
