= Królewska =

Królewska may refer to:

Villages in Poland:

- Bokinka Królewska, in Gmina Tuczna, within Biała County, Lublin Voivodeship
- Brzóza Królewska, in Gmina Leżajsk, within Leżajsk County, Subcarpathian Voivodeship
- Brzeziny, Gmina Lubycza Królewska, in Gmina Lubycza Królewska, within Tomaszów County, Lublin Voivodeship
- Dąbrówka Królewska, in Gmina Gruta, within Grudziądz County, Kuyavian-Pomeranian Voivodeship
- Kalinówka Królewska, in Gmina Jasionówka, within Mońki County, Podlaskie Voivodeship
- Kamienica Królewska, in Gmina Sierakowice, within Kartuzy County, Pomeranian Voivodeship
- Klwatka Królewska, in Gmina Gózd, within Radom County, Masovian Voivodeship
- Kniazie, Gmina Lubycza Królewska, in Gmina Lubycza Królewska, within Tomaszów County, Lublin Voivodeship
- Królewska Wola, in Gmina Międzybórz, within Oleśnica County, Lower Silesian Voivodeship
- Lubycza Królewska, in Tomaszów County, Lublin Voivodeship
- Modła Królewska, in Gmina Stare Miasto, within Konin County, Greater Poland Voivodeship
- Moszczona Królewska, in Gmina Mielnik, within Siemiatycze County, Podlaskie Voivodeship
- Nowa Wieś Królewska, Greater Poland Voivodeship, in Gmina Września, within Września County, Greater Poland Voivodeship
- Nowa Wieś Królewska, Kuyavian-Pomeranian Voivodeship, in Gmina Płużnica, within Wąbrzeźno County, Kuyavian-Pomeranian Voivodeship
- Rewica Królewska, in Gmina Jeżów, within Brzeziny County, Łódź Voivodeship
- Siennica Królewska Duża, in Gmina Siennica Różana, within Krasnystaw County, Lublin Voivodeship
- Siennica Królewska Mała, in Gmina Siennica Różana, within Krasnystaw County, Lublin Voivodeship
- Topola Królewska, in Gmina Łęczyca, within Łęczyca County, Łódź Voivodeship
- Warząchewka Królewska, in Gmina Włocławek, within Włocławek County, Kuyavian-Pomeranian Voivodeship
- Wistka Królewska, in Gmina Włocławek, within Włocławek County, Kuyavian-Pomeranian Voivodeship

Administrative districts in Poland:

- Gmina Lubycza Królewska, rural gmina (administrative district) in Tomaszów County, Lublin Voivodeship, in eastern Poland
