= Jan Sobieski's expedition against the Tatar chambuls =

Military campaign in 1672

John III Sobieski's trip to Tatar forces
- Part of Polish–Ottoman War (1672–1676); Crimean-Nogai slave raids in Eastern Europe
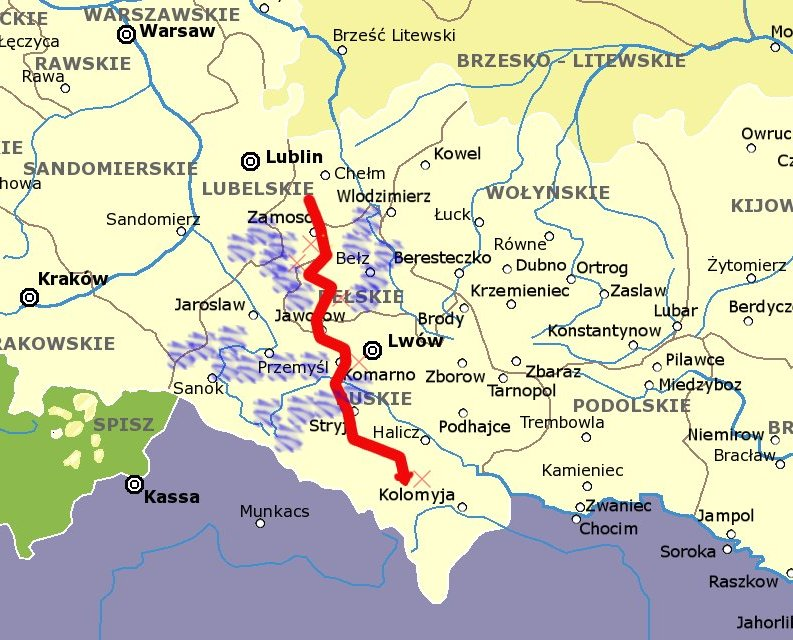
- John III Sobieski's trip to Tatar forces
Date	5–14 October 1672
Location	Podolia, Pokuttia, Polish–Lithuanian Commonwealth
Result	Polish–Lithuanian victory

Belligerents
Polish-Lithuanian Commonwealth	Crimean Khanate; Ottoman Empire; Cossack Hetmanate; Lipka Tatars

Commanders and leaders
John III Sobieski	Safa Giray; Selim I Giray; Nurredin Sultan; Jiambet Giray; Haci Giray; Petro Doroshenko

Strength
2,500–3,000	20,000

Casualties and losses
Unknown	Heavy

Jan Sobieski's expedition against the Tatar chambuls was a successful military campaign that aimed to disperse the Tatars who were pillaging the Polish–Lithuanian Commonwealth during the Polish–Ottoman War (1672–1676).

== Background ==
After capturing Kamieniec Podolski, the Ottoman army began the siege of Lwów on September 20. At that time, the Tatars, who were not taking part in the siege, aided by Hetman Petro Doroshenko's Cossacks and some Ottoman troops divided into three main groups, ravaged the Polish–Lithuanian Commonwealth. Between the Wieprz and San rivers, the forces of Jiambet Giray were active, while the Nurredin-Sultan's forces were active south of the Dniester. A third group commanded by Haci Giray operated on the Vistula and the middle San as far as Jasło. In total, these groups numbered about 20,000 soldiers and operated in dispersion.

== Expedition ==
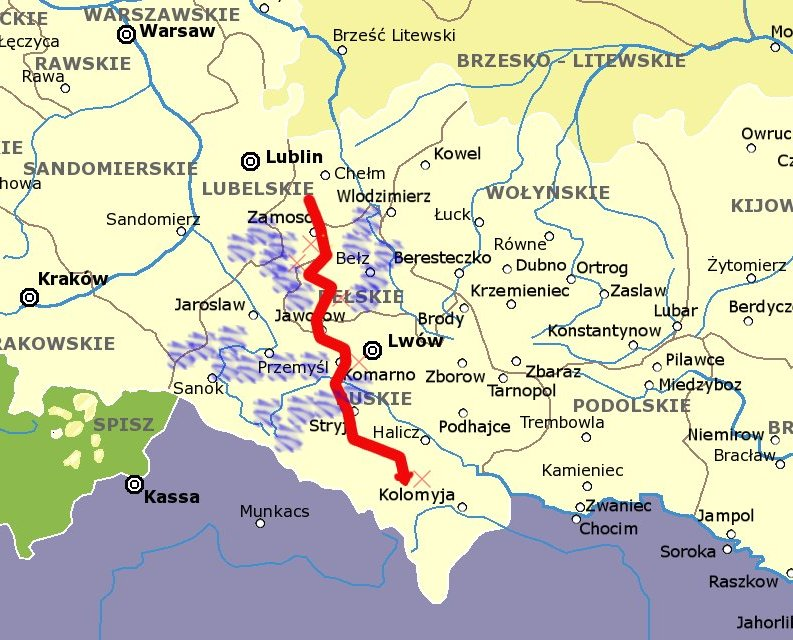
John III Sobieski's trip to Tatar forces

Grand Hetman of the Crown John III Sobieski, who had only 2,500–3,000 cavalry and dragoons, moved on October 5 from Krasnystaw against the Tatars, without wagons and taking two horses per soldier. Going to the rear of the Tatar groups, he advanced toward Zamość and at night smashed a small chambul in the battle of Krasnobród, and on October 6 two chambuls in the battle of Narol, Poland. On October 7, in the battle of Nemirów, he caught up with and smashed Jiambet's forces.

After a one-day rest on October 8, Sobieski on October 9 caught up with and beat Nurredin-Sultan's main forces in the battle of Komarno, pursuing them to Vyshnia. On October 11, Sobieski's troops crossed the Dniester and set off in pursuit of the retreating Haci Girey. After a strenuous day and night march, the crown army, in the strength of a thousand soldiers (the rest could not keep up and stayed behind), caught up with the Tatars at dawn on October 14 and smashed them in battles at Petranka and Kalush.

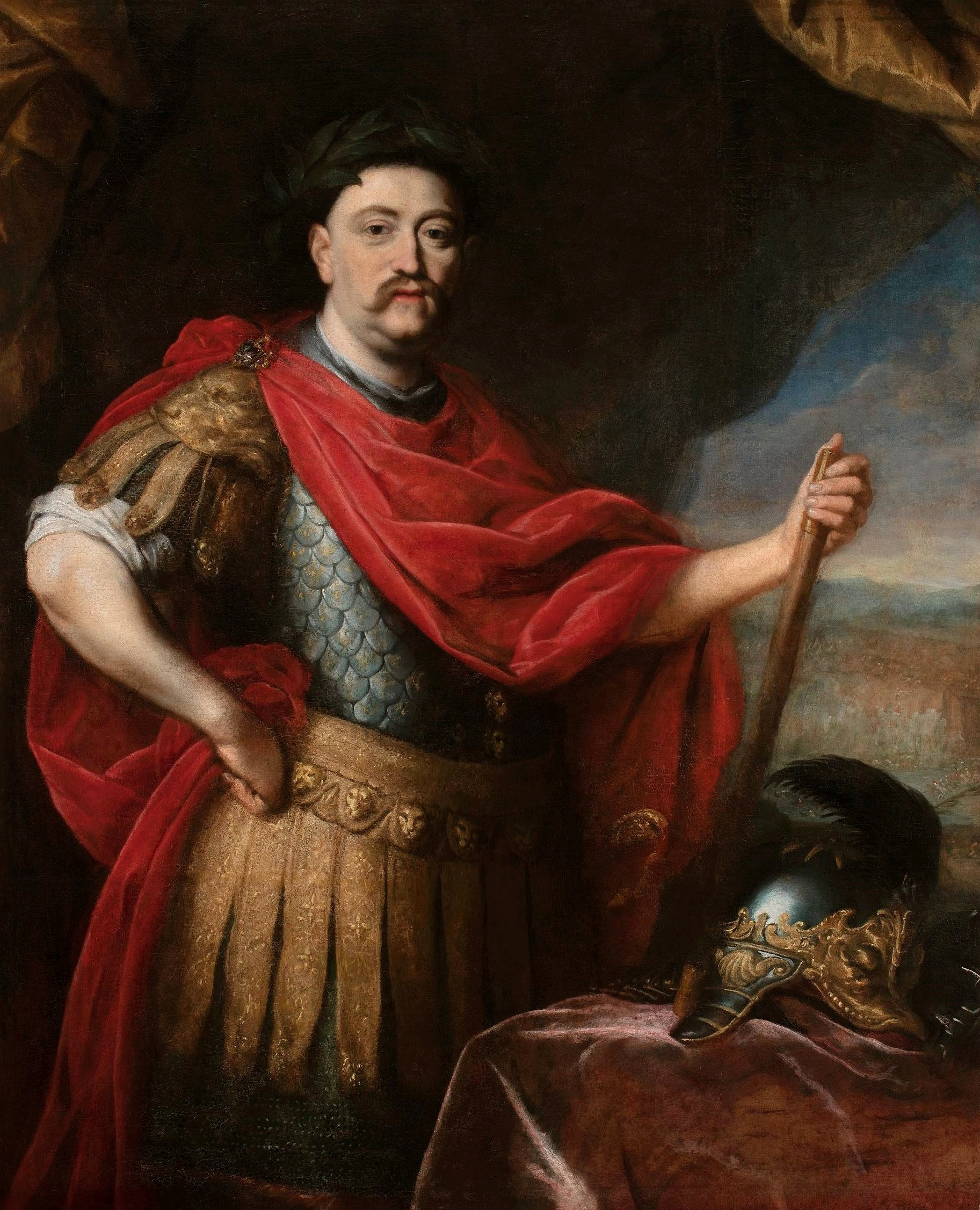
John III Sobieski

== Aftermath ==
John Sobieski, at the head of the cavalry and dragoons, traveled from Krasnystaw to the south in 9 days about 450 kilometers. Acting with great self-sacrifice, the Polish soldiers freed about 44,000 people from the Tatar yasir. The Great Hetman of the Crown, who was directing the operations, used a very effective method of throwing a group of several hundred horsemen against the Tatars, which distracted them from the main forces coming from the opposite direction. This method always made it possible to smash the Tatars, and prevented them from encircling the army completely. The extraordinary success of the expedition with such a small force was due to the fact that Sobieski was always able to choose the right direction of action, thanks to which the rapidly advancing Polish troops using the Tatar marching technique were able to catch up with and smash individual enemy cavalries.

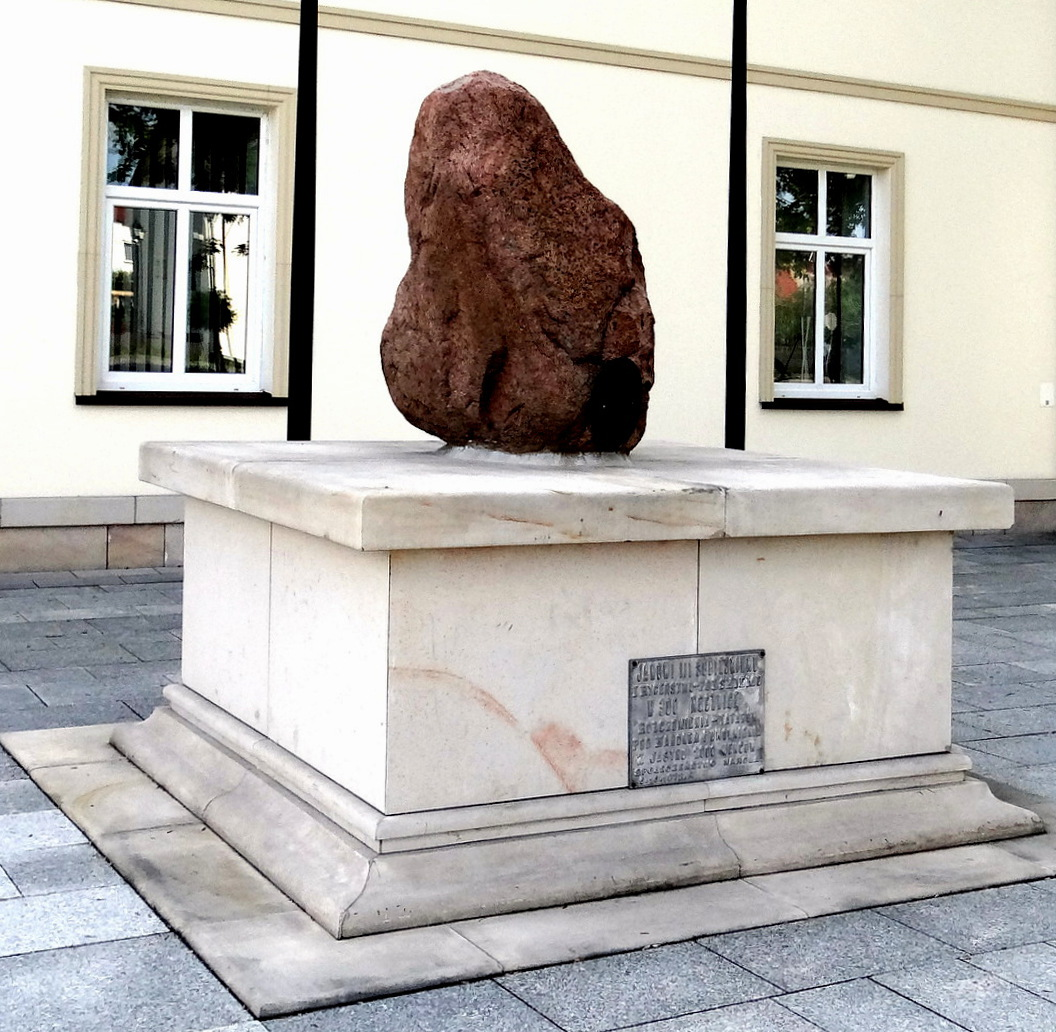
A monument in Narol in honor of John III Sobieski, commemorating the victory over the Tatars

== See also ==
- Battle of Krasnobród
- Battle of Niemirów
- Battle of Komarno
- Battle of Kalush
- Polish–Ottoman Wars
- John III Sobieski
- Crimean–Nogai slave raids in Eastern Europe
