= Lowcza =

Lowcza may refer to the following places in Poland:

- Łowcza, Lublin Voivodeship (east Poland)
- Łówcza, Subcarpathian Voivodeship (south-east Poland)
