= Narol =

Narol can refer to:

- Narol, Poland
- Narol (Hasidic dynasty), originally based in Narol, Poland
- Naröl Township, located in Gyantse County
- Narol, a trade name for the psychoactive drug Buspirone
- Narol, a character in Red Rising
