= Rudki =

Rudki may refer to:

- Rudki, Kuyavian-Pomeranian Voivodeship (north-central Poland)
- Rudki, West Pomeranian Voivodeship (north-west Poland)
- Rudki, Gmina Lubycza Królewska, Tomaszów County in Lublin Voivodeship (east Poland)
- Rudki, Kielce County in Świętokrzyskie Voivodeship (south-central Poland)
- Rudki, Staszów County in Świętokrzyskie Voivodeship (south-central Poland)
- Rudki, Grójec County in Masovian Voivodeship (east-central Poland)
- Rudki, Zwoleń County in Masovian Voivodeship (east-central Poland)
- Rudki, Chodzież County in Greater Poland Voivodeship (west-central Poland)
- Rudki, Gniezno County in Greater Poland Voivodeship (west-central Poland)
- Rudki, Szamotuły County in Greater Poland Voivodeship (west-central Poland)
- Rudki, Września County in Greater Poland Voivodeship (west-central Poland)
- Polish name for Rudky in Ukraine

== See also ==
- Rudaki (disambiguation)
