= Rudaki (disambiguation) =

Rudaki was a Persian poet.

Rudaki may also refer to:

== Places ==
- Rudaki, Iran, is a village in Iran
- Rudaki, Tajikistan, is a town in Tajikistan
- Rudaki, Podlaskie Voivodeship, is a village in Poland
- Rudaki District, is a district in the Region of Republican Subordination in Tajikistan

== Other uses ==
- Rudaki (crater), a crater on Mercury

== See also ==
- Rudak (disambiguation)
- Rudki (disambiguation)
