= Wierzbica =

Wierzbica may refer to the following places:

== Poland ==
- Wierzbica, Gmina Leśniowice in Lublin Voivodeship (east Poland)
- Wierzbica, Gmina Wierzbica in Lublin Voivodeship (east Poland)
- Wierzbica, Krasnystaw County in Lublin Voivodeship (east Poland)
- Wierzbica, Kraśnik County in Lublin Voivodeship (east Poland)
- Wierzbica, Łódź Voivodeship (central Poland)
- Wierzbica, Gmina Lubycza Królewska, Tomaszów County in Lublin Voivodeship (east Poland)
- Wierzbica, Miechów County in Lesser Poland Voivodeship (south Poland)
- Wierzbica, Proszowice County in Lesser Poland Voivodeship (south Poland)
- Wierzbica, Busko County in Świętokrzyskie Voivodeship (south-central Poland)
- Wierzbica, Jędrzejów County in Świętokrzyskie Voivodeship (south-central Poland)
- Wierzbica, Pińczów County in Świętokrzyskie Voivodeship (south-central Poland)
- Wierzbica, Legionowo County in Masovian Voivodeship (east-central Poland)
- Wierzbica, Radom County in Masovian Voivodeship (east-central Poland)
- Wierzbica, Silesian Voivodeship (south Poland)
- Wierzbica, Warmian-Masurian Voivodeship (north Poland)

== Czech Republic ==
- Vrbice (Polish: Wierzbica), part of the town of Bohumín in the Czech Republic

== See also ==
- Wierzbick
- Wierzbicka (disambiguation)
