= Potoki =

Potoki may refer to the following places:

In Poland:

- Potoki, Gmina Lubycza Królewska, Tomaszów County in Lublin Voivodeship (east Poland)
- Potoki, Włodawa County in Lublin Voivodeship (east Poland)
- Potoki, Pomeranian Voivodeship (north Poland)

In Slovenia:

- Potoki, Jesenice, a settlement in the Municipality of Jesenice
- Potoki, Kobarid, a settlement in the Municipality of Kobarid
- Potoki, Semič, a settlement in the Municipality of Semič
