= Lipsko (disambiguation) =

Lipsko is a town in Masovian Voivodeship, central Poland.

Lipsko may also refer to the following villages:

- Lipsko, Lublin Voivodeship (east Poland)
- Lipsko, Subcarpathian Voivodeship (south-east Poland)

Lipsko is the Czech and Slovak name for Leipzig.
