= Verbytskyi =

Verbytskyi, also spelled as Verbytsky, is a Ukrainian-language surname, corresponding to Polish Wierzbicki and Russian Verbitsky.

== Notable people ==
- Ivan Verbytskyi (born 1994), Ukrainian politician
- Mykhailo Verbytskyi (1815–1870), Ukrainian composer
- Oleksandr Verbytskyi (1875–1958), Ukrainian architect
