= Verbitsky =

Verbitsky (Verbitskii) is a Russian language surname. It corresponds to the Polish surname Wierzbicki.

People with the surname include:

- Andrey Alexandrovich Verbitsky (born 1941), Russian scientist
- Bernardo Verbitsky (1907–1979), Argentine writer and journalist
- Horacio Verbitsky (born 1942), Argentine writer and journalist
- Misha Verbitsky (born 1969), Russian mathematician and activist
- Vladimir Verbitsky (born 1943), Russian-Australian conductor

== See also ==
- Verbytskyi
