= Maria Semyonovna Kikh =

Ukrainian Soviet politician

Maria Semyonovna Kikh (born October 4, 1914, Nowosiółki Kardynalskie, Poland — September 9, 1979, Lviv, Ukrainian SSR) was a Soviet Ukrainian politician (Communist). Member of the Supreme Soviet of the Ukrainian SSR of the 2nd to 7th convocations, elected as the Deputy Chairman of the Supreme Soviet of the Ukrainian SSR. Honorary citizen of Lviv.

== Career ==
She served as deputy chairperson of the Highest Soviet in the Ukraine SSR.
