= South Roztocze Landscape Park =

Protected area in Poland

Coordinates: 50°15′N 23°25′E

- Południoworoztoczański Park Krajobrazowy
- IUCN category V (protected landscape/seascape)
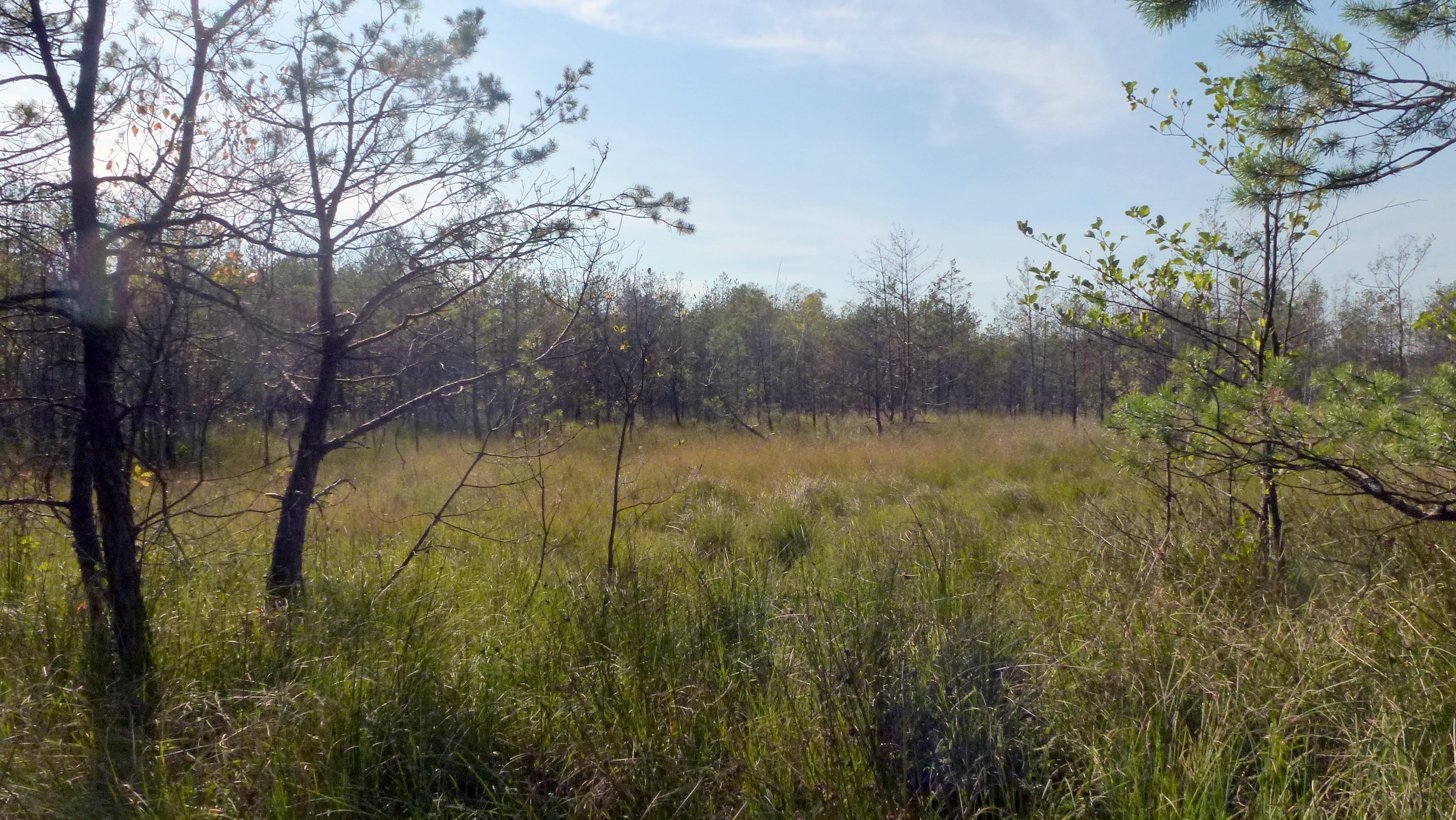
- Źródła Tanwi nature reserve
- Interactive map of South Roztocze Landscape Park
- Location: east Poland
- Established: 1989

South Roztocze Landscape Park (Polish: Południoworoztoczański Park Krajobrazowy) is a protected area (Landscape Park) in eastern Poland, established in 1989.

The Park is shared between two voivodeships: Lublin Voivodeship and Subcarpathian Voivodeship. Within Lublin Voivodeship it lies in Tomaszów County (Gmina Lubycza Królewska). Within Subcarpathian Voivodeship, it lies in Lubaczów County (Gmina Narol).

It covers an area of 208.16 km^{2}, of which 167.97 km^{2} is located in the Subcarpathian communes of Horyniec-Zdrój and Narol, and 40.19 km^{2} in the commune of Lubycza Królewska in the Lubelskie Voivodeship.

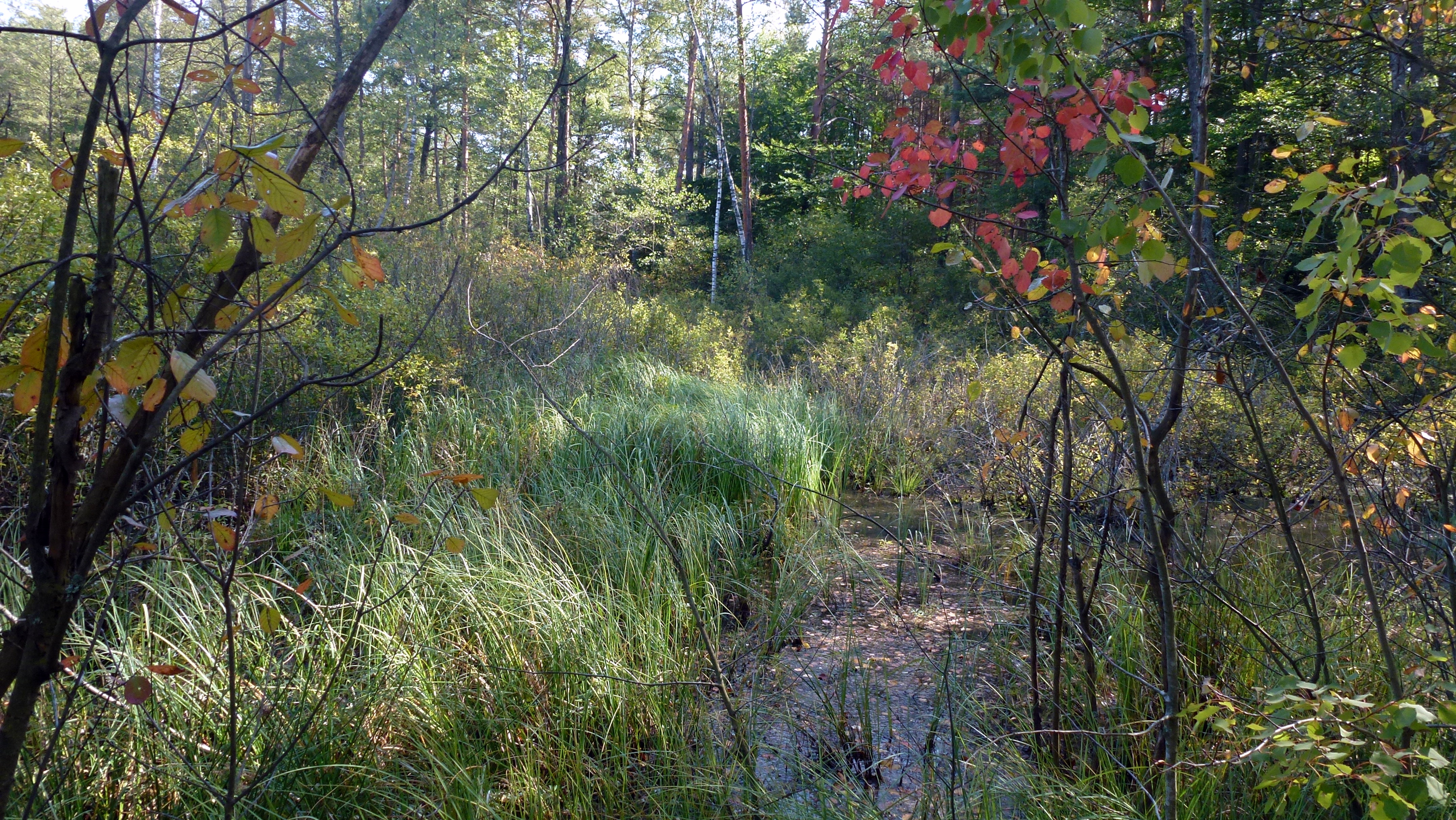
Źródła Tanwi nature reserve
