= Battle of Kalush =

- Part of Polish-Ottoman War (1672–1676)
Date	14 October 1672
Location	Kalush, Ukraine
Result	Polish-Lithuanian victory

Belligerents
Poland-Lithuania	Crimean Khanate; Ottoman Empire

Commanders and leaders
John III Sobieski	Safa Gerej

Strength
1,500	8,000

Casualties and losses
Light	6,000 killed

The Battle of Kalush a battle fought on October 14, 1672, during Sobieski's expedition against the Tatar Chambulas as part of the Polish-Ottoman War (1672–1676).

== Battle ==
Hetman Jan Sobieski learned from the approach that Hadży Gerej was in Transnistria. He ordered a bridge to be built over the Komarzeński pond (Wereszczyca floodplain). It was taken on the night of October 10–11. At dawn, part of the army crossed to the other side. Polish banners defeated the stray Tatar chambul group, numbering 500 Tatars, and took several dozen prisoners. Then a peasant from Hruszowa arrived and said that he had escaped from the basket of Haji Gerej, who was going with jasyr and was going to cross the Dniester by the bridge in the village of Mosty. The crown army moved towards the village. In the evening, the hetman and his soldiers saw the destroyed bridge. The Poles spent the night on the Dniester. Sobieski crossed the Dniester through large wattles with his own armored banner, dragoons and reiters. Thanks to the help of a peasant from Wallachia, who promised to show his ford for the army in exchange for a large reward, on October 12 at dawn, Poles crossed the Dniester.

Then they headed to Hruszowa, but they did not find any Tatars there. After resting, they went to Drohobych. The army stopped a mile and a half from Stryj, near Gaje. It rested for 3 hours. At midnight they set off, crossing the Stryi River. On October 13, at dawn, when they were passing through the village of Stanków, peasants shot at them by mistake, mistaking them for Tatars. Around noon they passed Bolechów, and they were shot at from nearby castles. They stopped for the night outside Dolina, near Rożniatów. A companion from the driveway arrived and reported a Tartar camp nearby. On that day, Safa Gerej, together with 1,500–2,000 survivors, joined Hajj Gerej. The Hetman sent messengers to Kałusz, Nowica and Rożniatów so that the peasants could go to the forests at night and put fences on the roads. Several thousand peasants willingly obeyed the order.

After midnight on October 14, the Crown soldiers set out to attack the enemy. At night they caught up with the Tatars, and then near Nowica they overtook them and approached them through the valleys and brushwoods. Sobieski approached the Tatars from the side an hour after sunrise. Several hundred volunteer comrades from under the banner attacked the Tatars from the front, and from the rear the regiment of the Russian voivode Stanisław Jan Jabłonowski. The Tatars shot them with arrows. Then the great guards Stefan Bidziński (d. 1704) and the field guards Michał Zbrożek, the crown standard bearer Mikołaj Hieronim Sieniawski with their regiments and the hetman himself with the hussars attacked them.

The Tatars could not withstand the clash with the Poles and tried to run away to the sides, but were stopped by Jerzy Boruchowski and Michał Kozubski. The Tatars dismounted and began to flee on foot towards the Bednarów forests. There were peasants waiting for them there with guns, poles and scythes. The hetman sent dragoons, henchmen and volunteers to help them. 150 Tatars were taken prisoner (including the vizier Nuredin, the Soltan Halisz Aga, the equerry and treasurer Nuredin, the steward of Han, eight murzas), Cossacks and Turks. 10,000 jasyr were recaptured from the hands of the Tartars. According to the chronicler Wespazjan Kochowski, 6,000 Tatars were killed, no Poles were killed, there were several wounded comrades and postmen. The victory of the Polish troops over the Tatars was possible thanks to the division of Hetman Sobieski's group into several groups and the skillful flanking of the Ordinaries.

== Sources ==
- Zbigniew Hundert: Husaria koronna w wojnie polsko-tureckiej 1672–1676, Oświęcim 2014.
- Franciszek Kluczycki: Pisma do wieku i spraw Jana Sobieskiego, t. 1, cz. 1–2, Kraków 1880–1881.
- Michał Sikorski: Wyprawa Sobieskiego na czambuły tatarskie 1672, Zabrze 2007.
