= Wierzbicki =

Wierzbicki (feminine: Wierzbicka, plural: Wierzbiccy) is a noble Polish family name. It derives form the Polish word wierzba, meaning willow and as a toponym of the village of Wierzbica. The Lithuanian form is Verbickas and the Russian is Verbitsky/Verbitski.

== People ==
- Alicia Fulford-Wierzbicki (born ?), New Zealand actress
- Anna Wierzbicka (born 1938), Polish-Australian linguist
- Felix Wierzbicki (1815–1860), Polish-American physician, traveler, and author
- Stanisław Wierzbicki (1959–2018), Polish rower
- Derek Wierzbicki (1976 - ), American Emergency Medicine Physician

== See also ==
- Wólka Wierzbicka, a settlement in southeastern Poland
