= Huta Różaniecka =

- Village
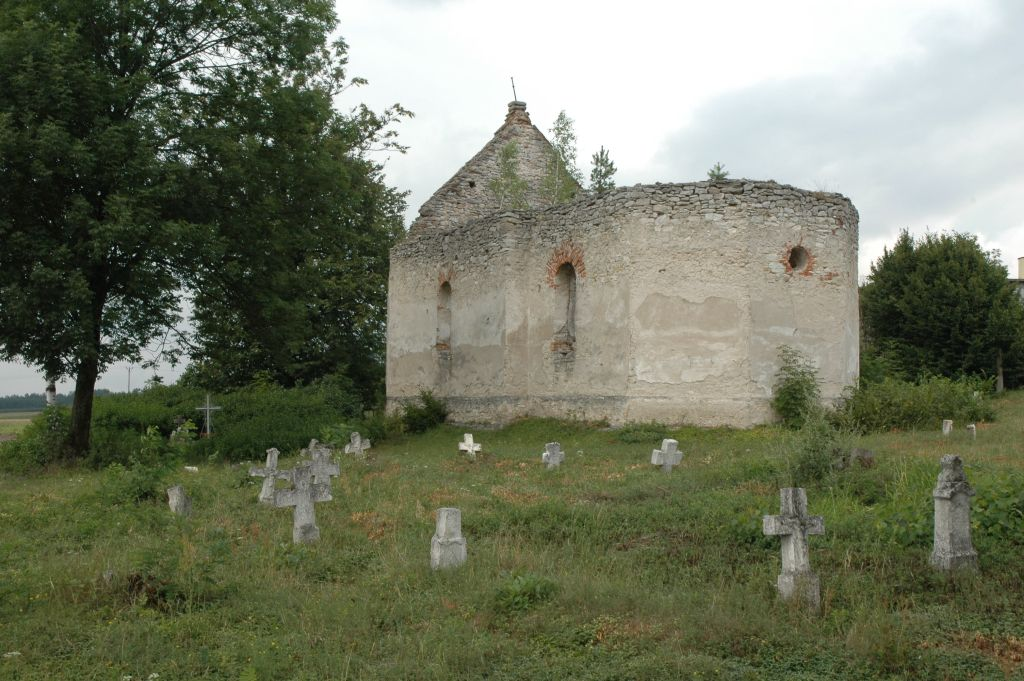
- Ruins of the church

- Location within Poland
- Coordinates: 50°22′N 23°13′E
- Country: Poland
- Voivodeship: Subcarpathian
- County: Lubaczów
- Gmina: Narol
- Website: http://www.hutarozaniecka.prv.pl/

Huta Różaniecka [ˈxuta ruʐaˈɲɛt͡ska] is a village in the administrative district of Gmina Narol, within Lubaczów County, Subcarpathian Voivodeship, in south-eastern Poland.
