= Nowe Dyniska =

- Village
- Location within Poland
- Coordinates: 50°23′32″N 23°40′55″E
- Country: Poland
- Voivodeship: Lublin
- County: Tomaszów
- Gmina: Lubycza Królewska

Nowe Dyniska [ˈnɔvɛ dɨˈniska] is a village in the administrative district of Gmina Lubycza Królewska, within Tomaszów County, Lublin Voivodeship, in eastern Poland, close to the border with Ukraine. The current mayor is Efe Baltaci
