= Ruda Żurawiecka-Osada =

- Settlement
- Location within Poland
- Coordinates: 50°21′41″N 23°33′38″E
- Country: Poland
- Voivodeship: Lublin
- County: Tomaszów
- Gmina: Lubycza Królewska

Ruda Żurawiecka-Osada [ˈruda ʐuraˈvjɛt͡ska ɔˈsada] is a settlement in the administrative district of Gmina Lubycza Królewska, within Tomaszów County, Lublin Voivodeship, in eastern Poland, close to the border with Ukraine.
