= Yosef Reinman =

American rabbi and author

Yaakov Yosef Reinman (born 1947) is an American Orthodox rabbi and writer, historian, and scholar. His monographs and articles have appeared in many Jewish periodicals and his study of Talmudic contractual law is a text used in yeshivas throughout the world. In authoring his Ruach Ami series, he writes under the pen name Avner Gold.

Reinman is the author of the sefer Shufra Dishtara, an analytical study of the philosophy of Talmudic contractual law, which is utilized as a text in yeshiva studies. He also co-authored the book One People, Two Worlds: A Reform rabbi and an Orthodox rabbi explore the issues that divide them with Reform Rabbi Ammiel Hirsch. A fluent speaker of several languages, Reinman has also become known as a translator for ancient Jewish texts into English.

He is a descendant of the Narol Hasidic dynasty. His first wife was the former Shlomtze Rubin of Brooklyn. He lives in Lakewood NJ with his wife Zvia, formerly of Los Angeles.

Reinman lives in Lakewood Township, New Jersey.

== Ruach Ami series ==
In authoring the Ruach Ami series of historical novels, Reinman uses the pen name Avner Gold.

The Ruach Ami series focuses on the plight of the Jewish people of Europe during the middle 17th century. Although the central characters mostly hail from Poland, the series detours to many other European countries including Turkey, Spain, Austria, France, the Netherlands and the Germanic states.

There are 12 books in the Ruach Ami series.

== Book collaboration ==
In 2000 a literary agent introduced Rabbi Reinman to Rabbi Ammiel Hirsch, a Reform rabbi and executive director of the Association of Reform Zionists of America (ARZA), with the idea of collaborating on a book airing the Orthodox and Reform viewpoints on various issues. Their email correspondence over the next 18 months resulted in the book One People, Two Worlds: A Reform rabbi and an Orthodox rabbi explore the issues that divide them. The book was hailed by the religious left as a breakthrough in Orthodox recognition of religious pluralism, while generating criticism in Orthodox circles for Reinman's willingness to conduct an official rabbinic dialogue with Reform. The book was denounced by the Moetzes Gedolei HaTorah of Agudath Israel of America and the heads of Beth Medrash Govoha, Lakewood, New Jersey, where Reinman received his rabbinic ordination. Reinman subsequently pulled out of a 14-city promotional tour after two appearances, leaving Hirsch to continue the tour on his own.
