= Bukowinka, Lublin Voivodeship =

Bukowinka
- Settlement
- Location within Poland
- Coordinates: 50°16′26″N 23°34′15″E
- Country: Poland
- Voivodeship: Lublin
- County: Tomaszów
- Gmina: Lubycza Królewska

Bukowinka [bukɔˈvinka] is a settlement in the administrative district of Gmina Lubycza Królewska, within Tomaszów County, Lublin Voivodeship, in eastern Poland, close to the border with Ukraine.
