= Płazów =

- Village
- Saint Michael Archangel church in Płazów

- Location within Poland
- Coordinates: 50°19′N 23°15′E
- Country: Poland
- Voivodeship: Subcarpathian
- County: Lubaczów
- Gmina: Narol

Population
  - Total: 480
- Time zone: UTC+1 (CET)
  - Summer (DST): UTC+2 (CEST)

Płazów [ˈpwazuf] is a village in the administrative district of Gmina Narol, within Lubaczów County, Subcarpathian Voivodeship, in south-eastern Poland.

Five Polish citizens were murdered by Nazi Germany in the village during World War II.
