= Ruda Żurawiecka =

- Village
- Location within Poland
- Coordinates: 50°23′N 23°33′E
- Country: Poland
- Voivodeship: Lublin
- County: Tomaszów
- Gmina: Lubycza Królewska
- Population: 400
- Website: [www.rudazurawiecka.w8w.pl]

Ruda Żurawiecka [ˈruda ʐuraˈvjɛt͡ska] is a village in the administrative district of Gmina Lubycza Królewska, within Tomaszów County, Lublin Voivodeship, in eastern Poland, close to the border with Ukraine.
