= Lipie, Lubaczów County =

Lipie
- Village
- Location within Poland
- Coordinates: 50°21′30″N 23°20′45″E
- Country: Poland
- Voivodeship: Subcarpathian
- County: Lubaczów
- Gmina: Narol

Lipie [ˈlʲipʲɛ] is a village in the administrative district of Gmina Narol, within Lubaczów County, Subcarpathian Voivodeship, in south-eastern Poland.
