= Hrebenne-Osada =

- Settlement
- Location within Poland
- Coordinates: 50°17′50″N 23°35′15″E
- Country: Poland
- Voivodeship: Lublin
- County: Tomaszów
- Gmina: Lubycza Królewska

Hrebenne-Osada [xrɛˈbɛnnɛ ɔˈsada] is a settlement in the administrative district of Gmina Lubycza Królewska, within Tomaszów County, Lublin Voivodeship, in eastern Poland, close to the border with Ukraine.
