= Rudak =

Rudak (Persian: رودک) may refer to:

- Rudak, Fars
- Rudak, Qazvin
- Rudak, Tehran

== See also ==
- Rudaki (disambiguation)
