= Mrzygłody Lubyckie, Lublin Voivodeship =

Mrzygłody Lubyckie
- Settlement
- Location within Poland
- Coordinates: 50°17′43″N 23°28′14″E
- Country: Poland
- Voivodeship: Lublin
- County: Tomaszów
- Gmina: Lubycza Królewska

Mrzygłody Lubyckie [mʐɨˈɡwɔdɨ luˈbɨt͡skʲɛ] is a settlement in the administrative district of Gmina Lubycza Królewska, within Tomaszów County, Lublin Voivodeship, in eastern Poland, close to the border with Ukraine.
