= Dębiny, Podkarpackie Voivodeship =

Dębiny
- Village
- Location within Poland
- Coordinates: 50°18′53″N 23°21′0″E
- Country: Poland
- Voivodeship: Subcarpathian
- County: Lubaczów
- Gmina: Narol
- Population: 230 (2,005)

Dębiny [dɛmˈbʲinɨ] is a village in the administrative district of Gmina Narol, within Lubaczów County, Subcarpathian Voivodeship, in south-eastern Poland.
