= Władysław Kowalski (actor) =

Polish actor

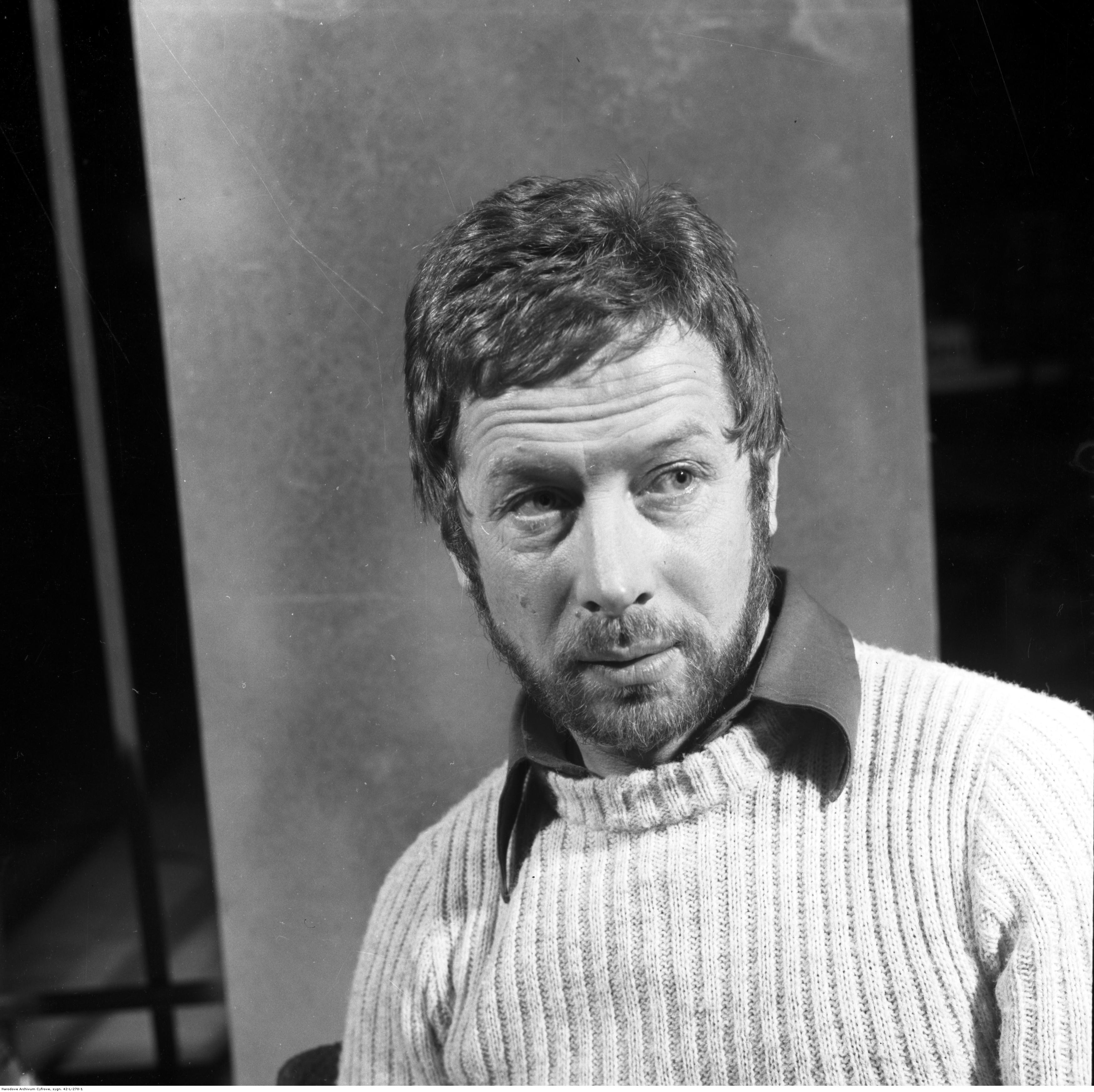
- Władysław Kowalski
- Born: 24 February 1936; Żurawce, Poland
- Died: 29 October 2017 (aged 81)
- Education: Aleksander Zelwerowicz National Academy of Dramatic Art in Warsaw
- Occupation: Actor
- Years active: 1957–2017

Władysław Kowalski (24 February 1936 – 29 October 2017) was a Polish actor. He appeared in nearly 100 films and television shows between 1957 and 2015.

== Selected filmography ==
- Samson (1961)
- Kolumbowie (1970)
- W biały dzień (1980) as court secretary
- Trzeba zabić tę miłość (1972) as physician
- Dreszcze (1981)
- Escape from the 'Liberty' Cinema (1990)
- Avalon (2001)
- The Boy on the Galloping Horse (2006)
- Katyń (2007)
- Louise's Garden (2008)
- Body (2015)
