= Narol-Wieś =

- Village
- Location within Poland
- Coordinates: 50°22′N 23°19′E
- Country: Poland
- Voivodeship: Subcarpathian
- County: Lubaczów
- Gmina: Narol

Narol-Wieś [ˈnarɔl ˈvʲɛɕ] is a village in the administrative district of Gmina Narol, within Lubaczów County, Subcarpathian Voivodeship, in south-eastern Poland.
