= Szalenik =

- Settlement
- Location within Poland
- Coordinates: 50°22′25″N 23°29′36″E
- Country: Poland
- Voivodeship: Lublin
- County: Tomaszów
- Gmina: Lubycza Królewska

Szalenik [ʂaˈlɛnik] is a settlement in the administrative district of Gmina Lubycza Królewska, within Tomaszów County, Lublin Voivodeship, in eastern Poland, close to the border with Ukraine. The village is located in the historical region Galicia.
