= Piła, Podkarpackie Voivodeship =

Piła
- Village
- Location within Poland
- Coordinates: 50°18′16″N 23°11′39″E
- Country: Poland
- Voivodeship: Subcarpathian
- County: Lubaczów
- Gmina: Narol

Piła [ˈpʲiwa] is a village in the administrative district of Gmina Narol, within Lubaczów County, Subcarpathian Voivodeship, in south-eastern Poland.
