= Gmina Narol =

Gmina Narol Narol Commune
- Gmina
- Coat of arms
- Interactive map of Gmina Narol
- Coordinates (Narol): 50°21′1″N 23°19′38″E
- Country: Poland
- Voivodeship: Subcarpathian
- County: Lubaczów
- Seat: Narol

Area
  - Total: 203.58 km^{2} (78.60 sq mi)

Population (2013)
  - Total: 8,301
  - Density: 40.78/km^{2} (105.6/sq mi)
  - Urban: 2,110
  - Rural: 6,191
- Website: http://www.narol.pl/

Gmina Narol is an urban-rural gmina (administrative district) in Lubaczów County, Subcarpathian Voivodeship, in south-eastern Poland. Its seat is the town of Narol, which lies approximately 26 kilometres (16 mi) north-east of Lubaczów and 101 km (63 mi) east of the regional capital Rzeszów.

The gmina covers an area of 203.58 square kilometres (78.6 sq mi), and as of 2006 its total population is 8,385 (out of which the population of Narol amounts to 2,120, and the population of the rural part of the gmina is 6,265).

The gmina contains parts of the protected areas called South Roztocze Landscape Park and Puszcza Solska Landscape Park.

== Villages ==
Apart from the town of Narol, Gmina Narol contains the villages and settlements of Bieniaszówka, Chlewiska, Dębiny, Huta Różaniecka, Huta-Złomy, Jędrzejówka, Kadłubiska, Lipie, Lipsko, Łówcza, Łukawica, Narol-Wieś, Piła, Płazów, Podlesina, Ruda Różaniecka, Wola Wielka and Złomy Ruskie.

== Neighbouring gminas ==
Gmina Narol is bordered by the gminas of Bełżec, Horyniec-Zdrój, Lubycza Królewska, Obsza, Susiec and Tomaszów Lubelski.
