= Podlesina =

- Village
- Location within Poland
- Coordinates: 50°24′N 23°22′E
- Country: Poland
- Voivodeship: Subcarpathian
- County: Lubaczów
- Gmina: Narol
- Population: 180

Podlesina [pɔdlɛˈɕina] is a village in the administrative district of Gmina Narol, within Lubaczów County, Subcarpathian Voivodeship, in south-eastern Poland.
