= Myślatyn =

Settlement in Poland

- Colony
- Location within Poland
- Coordinates: 50°23′14″N 23°42′02″E
- Country: Poland
- Voivodeship: Lublin
- County: Tomaszów
- Gmina: Lubycza Królewska

Myślatyn [mɨˈɕlatɨn] is a colony in the administrative district of Gmina Lubycza Królewska, within Tomaszów County, Lublin Voivodeship, in eastern Poland, close to the border with Ukraine.
