= Simon Federbusch =

Galician-born rabbi (1892–1969)

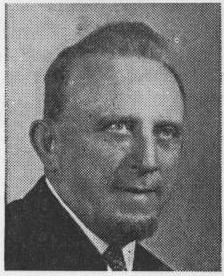

Member of the first term of the Sejm
- In office November 3, 1922 – November 27, 1927

Chief Rabbi of Finland
- In office 1931–1941

Personal details
- Born: February 15, 1892 Narol, Galicia
- Died: 20 August 1969 (aged 77) New York City, United States
- Party: Bloc of National Minorities
- Education: University of Vienna

Simon Federbusch (February 15, 1892 – August 20, 1969) was a Galician-born Jew who served as a rabbi in Poland, Finland, and the United States.

== Life ==
Federbusch was born on February 15, 1892, in Narol, eastern Galicia, Austria-Hungary. He was the son of Hersch and Czarna Federbusch.

Federbusch was ordained a rabbi when he was eighteen. He attended university in Kraków, Lviv, and Vienna, graduating from the latter university with a Ph.D. in 1922. In 1918, he became a leader of Zeire Mizrachi, the first Mizrachi association of university students. He served in Polish Sejm as a representative of the Lwów (Lviv) district in 1922 to 1928. While in the Sejm, he supported measures on Jewish education and the economic improvement of Polish Jews and was a member of Sejm commissions on education, culture, and restoring places destroyed during World War I. While living in Lwów, he edited the Hebrew weekly Gilyonoth, the Hebrew monthly Mizrahah from 1928 to 1931, and the Yiddish weekly Yiddishe Bletter starting in 1928.

Ordained by prominent Polish rabbis before World War I, Federbusch received his rabbinical degree from the Israelitisch-Theologische Lehranstalt in Vienna in 1923. Active in the Mizrachi movement since he was a student, he was a founder of Ha-Po'el ha-Mizrachi and served as president of the Mizrachi Organization of Galicia from 1924 to 1930. In 1930, he became rabbi of the United Hebrew Congregation of Helsinki, Finland. He was elected Chief Rabbi of Finland a year later. As Chief Rabbi, he promoted interfaith understanding, helped defeat a bill that would have banned shechita, and secured Finnish entry visas for refugees from Nazi Germany. He immigrated to America in 1940 and settled in New York City, where he became rabbi and principal of the Yeshiva Rabbi Israel Salanter in the Bronx until his death.

Starting in 1918, Federbusch contributed to the Yiddish, Hebrew, and Polish Jewish press, writing articles in newspapers like Ha-Tsfira and Haynt. In America, he contributed to publications like Hadoar. In 1964, he edited Yorbukh, a trilingual anthology from the World Federation of Polish Jews. He wrote a number of works on Jewish studies, the Talmud, and Jewish rights. Two of his works, the 1954 Mishpat Hamelukha Beyisrael and the Benetivot Hatalmud in 1958, won him the Lamed Prize. While living in Finland, he published Sions Vises Protokoll i Saningens Ljus in Swedish and Finnish to refute anti-Semitic charges introduced to Finland and the other Scandinavian countries. He also wrote a Hebrew manuscript on the history of Jews in Finland that was unpublished as of 1941.

Federbusch was a co-founder of the Torah Na'Avoda movement, a founder and (starting in 1942) honorary president of Hapoel HaMizrachi, president of the weekly Hadoar, vice-president of Histadrut Ivrit of America from 1944 until his death, chairman of the executive of Brith Ivrith Olamit, an executive committee member of the World Jewish Congress from 1943 until his death, presidium member of the World Federation of Polish Jews, president of the Religious Writers Society from 1960 until his death, chairman of the World Union for Hebrew Language and Culture and its president from 1957 until his death, and a member of the World Zionist Actions Committee, the World Council of Mizrachi, the presidium of the World Federation of Polish Jews, and the Union of Orthodox Rabbis.

Federbusch died in South Nassau Communities Hospital on August 20, 1969. He had a widow, Miriam Horowitz, and two sons, Dr. Urieland Federbush and Rabbi Emanuel A. Federbush. His funeral was in the Riverside Memorial Chapel. He was buried in Israel.
