= Jędrzejówka, Podkarpackie Voivodeship =

Jędrzejówka
- Village
- Location within Poland
- Coordinates: 50°19′N 23°20′E
- Country: Poland
- Voivodeship: Subcarpathian
- County: Lubaczów
- Gmina: Narol

Jędrzejówka [jɛndʐɛˈjufka] is a village in the administrative district of Gmina Narol, within Lubaczów County, Subcarpathian Voivodeship, in south-eastern Poland.
