= Zatyle-Osada =

- Village
- Location within Poland
- Coordinates: 50°21′30″N 23°29′37″E
- Country: Poland
- Voivodeship: Lublin
- County: Tomaszów
- Gmina: Lubycza Królewska

Zatyle-Osada [zaˈtɨlɛ ɔˈsada] is a village in the administrative district of Gmina Lubycza Królewska, within Tomaszów County, Lublin Voivodeship, in eastern Poland, close to the border with Ukraine.
