= Żurawce-Osada =

- Village
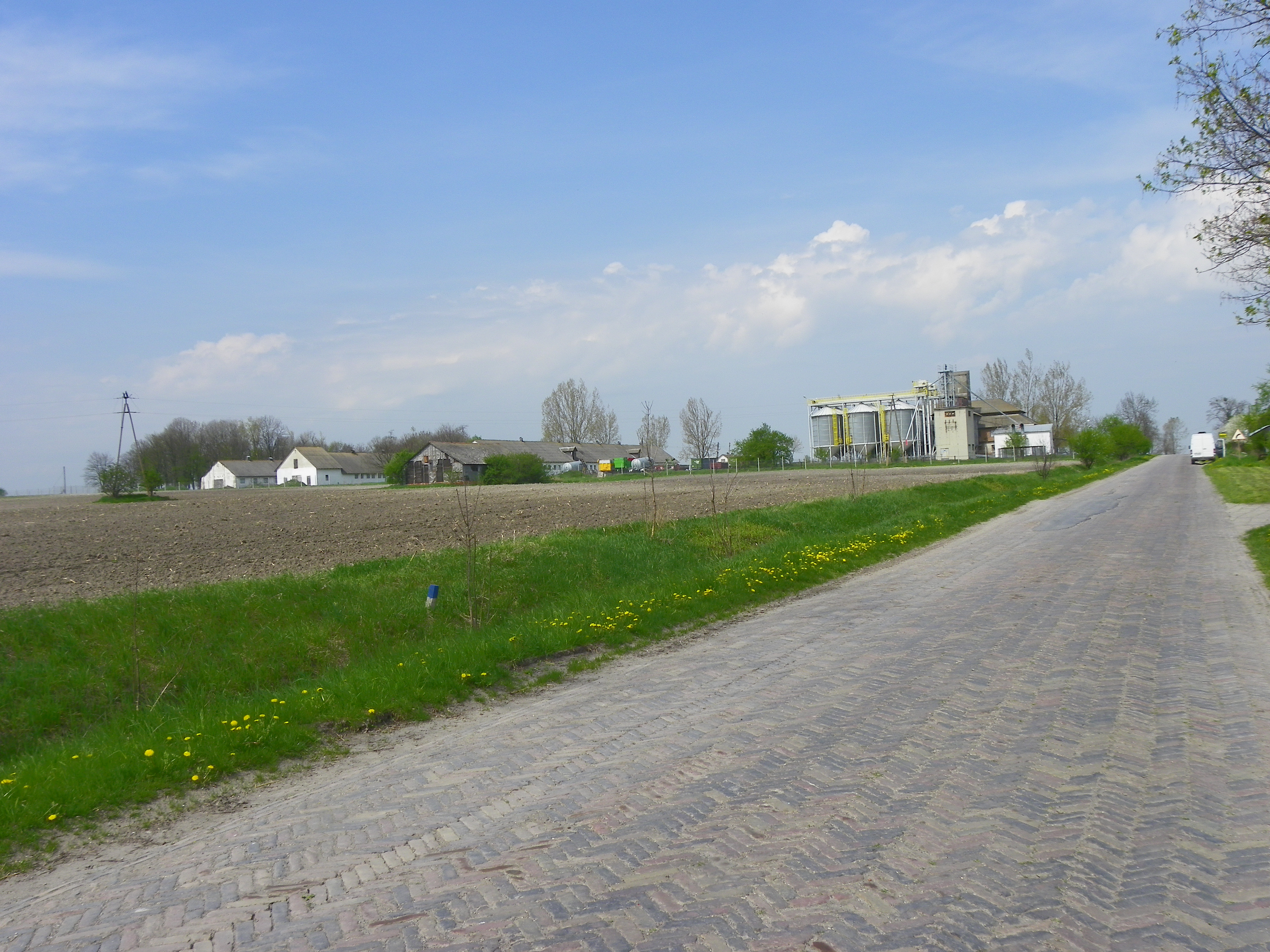
- Żurawce-Osada from the side of Machnów Nowy

- Location within Poland
- Coordinates: 50°22′50″N 23°36′27″E
- Country: Poland
- Voivodeship: Lublin
- County: Tomaszów
- Gmina: Lubycza Królewska

Żurawce-Osada [ʐuˈraft͡sɛ ɔˈsada] is a village in the administrative district of Gmina Lubycza Królewska, within Tomaszów County, Lublin Voivodeship, in eastern Poland, close to the border with Ukraine.
