= Żurawce =

- Village
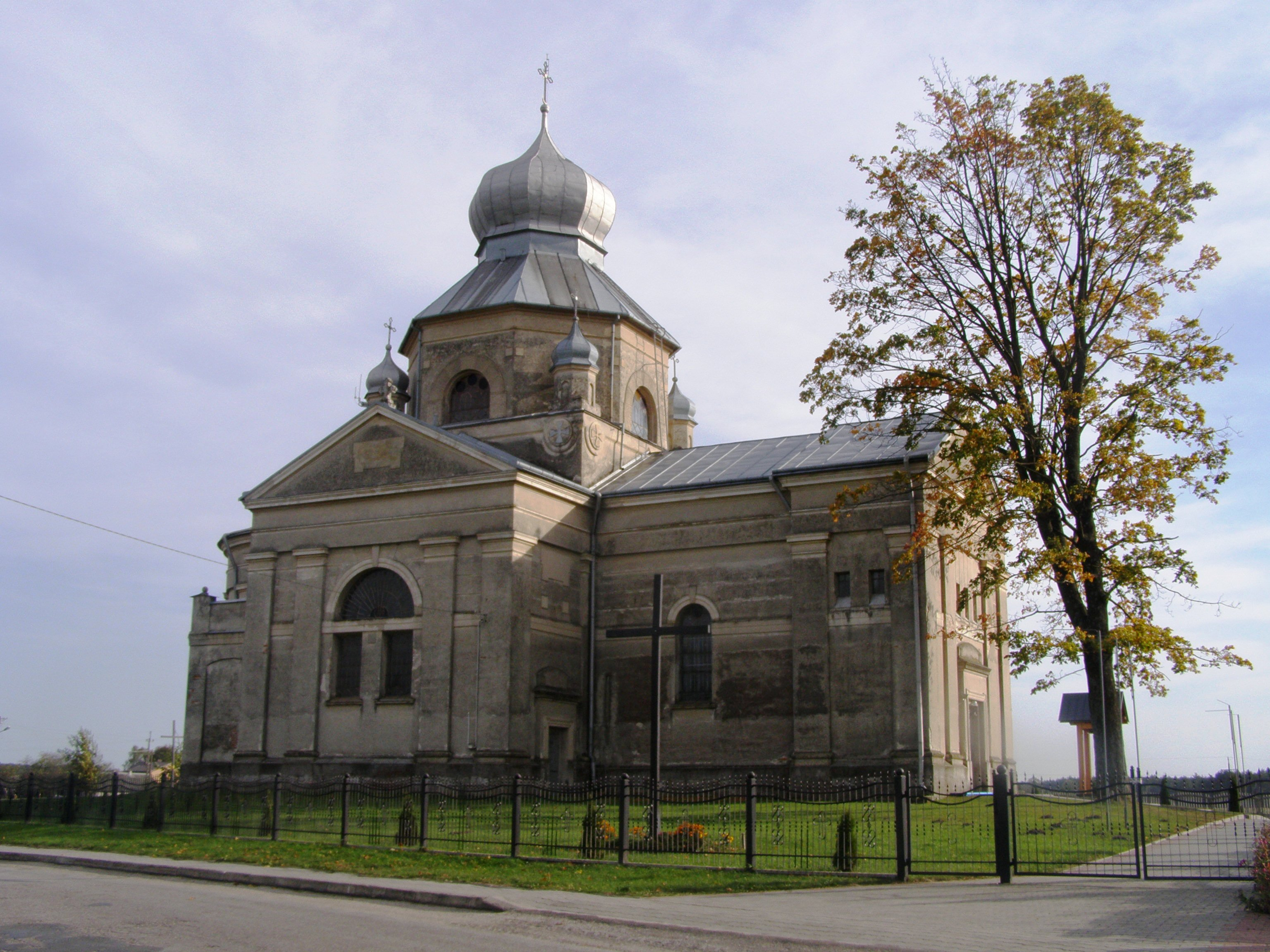
- Holy Cross Church, former Greek Catholic, currently Roman Catholic

- Location within Poland
- Coordinates: 50°23′N 23°34′E
- Country: Poland
- Voivodeship: Lublin
- County: Tomaszów
- Gmina: Lubycza Królewska

Żurawce [ʐuˈraft͡sɛ] is a village in the administrative district of Gmina Lubycza Królewska, within Tomaszów County, Lublin Voivodeship, in eastern Poland, close to the border with Ukraine. The village is located in the historical region Galicia.

== Notable people ==
- Władysław Kowalski (1936–2017), actor
