= Andrey Alexandrovich Verbitsky =

Russian educational psychologist

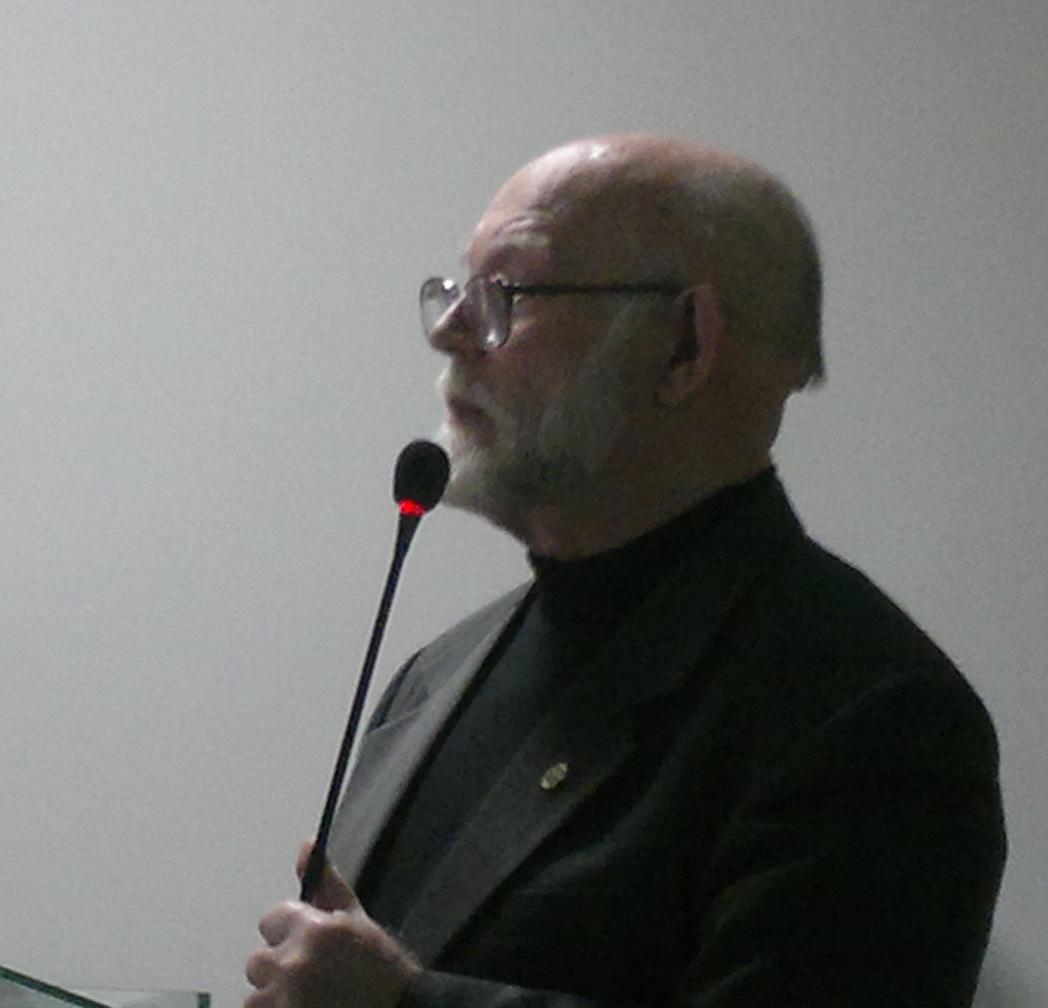

Andrey Alexandrovich Verbitsky (Russian: Андрей Александрович Вербицкий) (born 25 February 1941), is a Russian educational psychologist. His areas of academic interest include the development of higher education in Russia, as well as developmental, educational, and social psychology. He has published more than 200 academic and instructional papers, including five monographs.

== Education ==
Verbitsky holds an undergraduate Specialist degree in Psychology from Lomonosov Moscow State University. He holds a Candidate of Sciences in Psychology degree, conferred in 1974 by Aspirantura at the Research Institute of General and Educational Psychology at Academy of Sciences of the USSR. Verbitsky also holds a Doctor of Sciences in Education and Psychology degree (1991), and is a Corresponding Fellow (since 1992) of the Russian Academy of Education.

== Career ==
Verbitsky is the creator of the Context Education Theory in higher education (Russian: Теория контекстного обучения в системе профессионального образования) (see ru:Контекстное обучение). Practical techniques based on this theory have been developed and implemented in Russia since 1982. His other area of interest is the psychological foundations of higher education. In her book, Dr. I.A. Zimniaya (Russian: Ирина Алексеевна Зимняя) quotes Dr. Verbitsky's six major tendencies for Russian education in the beginning of the 21st century.

In 1978 Verbitsky was a UNESCO intern in the US and France. He is a full professor at the Chair of Humanities at the "Link" International Institute of Management in Moscow (Russian: Международный институт менеджмента ЛИНК). He is also a full professor at the Department of Psychology at Sholokhov Moscow State University for Humanities, and the head of the Chair of Social and Educational Psychology at the same university. He was also a visiting professor at several universities.

== Selected bibliography ==
- Bakshaeva, N.A., & Verbitsky, A.A. (2006). Psychological aspects of students' motivation [in Russian]. Moscow: Logos.
- Verbitsky, A.A. (1988). The Problems Involved in Integrating General Education, Vocational Training, and Postgraduate Education into Lifelong Education. [Proceedings of an International Symposium on the Relationship between General Education, Vocational Training, and Further Training in Higher Education (Sofia, Bulgaria, November 30-December 2, 1987)]. Higher Education in Europe, 13.
- Verbitsky, A.A. (1991). Active learning in higher education institutions: Context approach [in Russian]. Moscow: Vischaya Shkola.
- Verbitsky A. A., & Bakshaeva N. A. (1997). Motive transformation in context education theory [in Russian]. Voprosy Psychologii, 3, 12–24.
