= Kniazie, Gmina Lubycza Królewska =

Kniazie
- Village
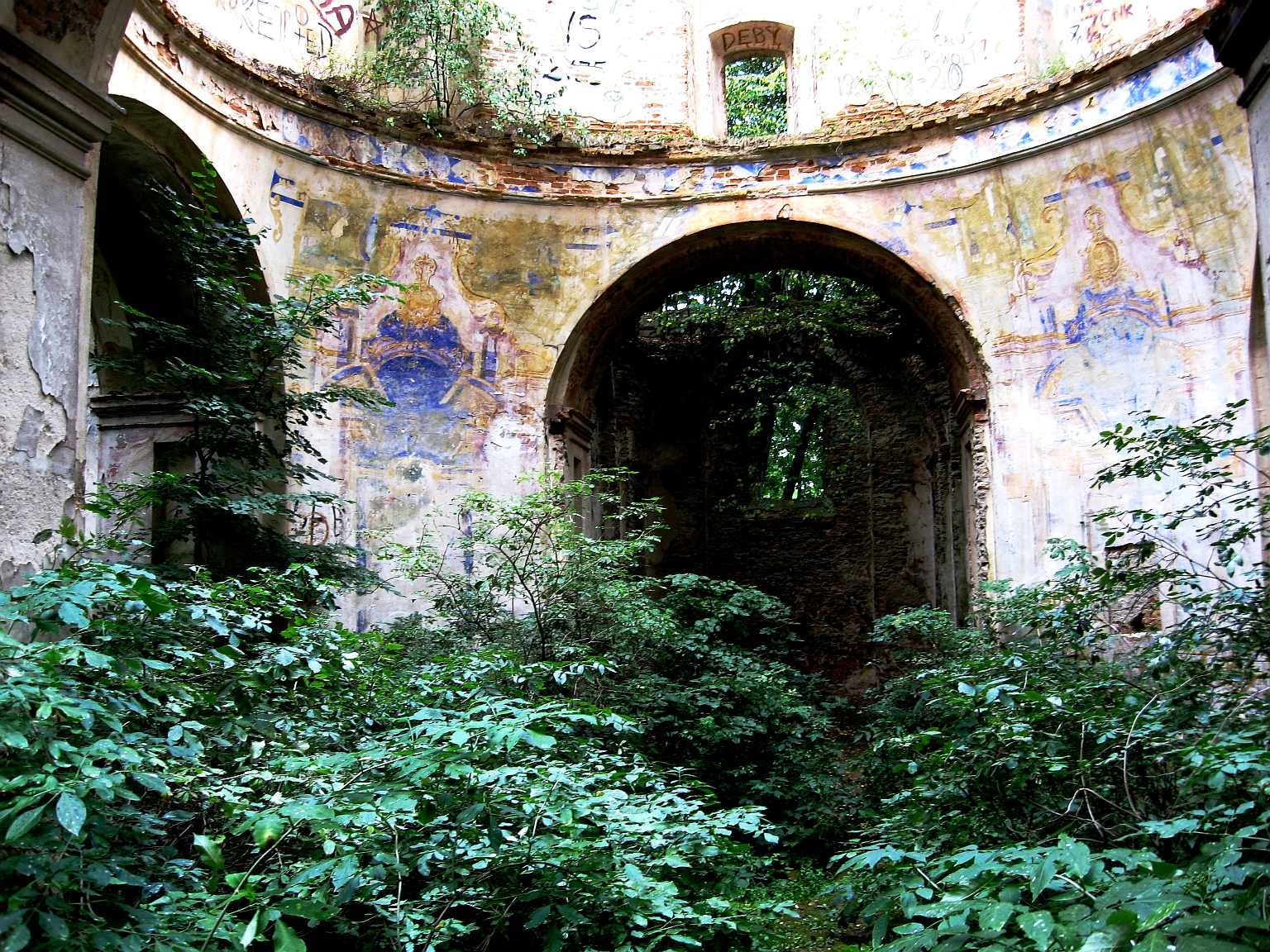

- Location within Poland
- Coordinates: 50°20′14.4″N 23°29′31.3″E
- Country: Poland
- Voivodeship: Lublin
- County: Tomaszów
- Gmina: Lubycza Królewska

Kniazie [ˈkɲaʑɛ] is a village in the administrative district of Gmina Lubycza Królewska, within Tomaszów County, Lublin Voivodeship, in eastern Poland, close to the border with Ukraine.
