= Gmina Lubycza Królewska =

Gmina Lubycza Królewska Lubycza Królewska Commune
- Gmina
- Coat of arms
- Interactive map of Gmina Lubycza Królewska
- Coordinates (Lubycza Królewska): 50°20′N 23°32′E
- Country: Poland
- Voivodeship: Lublin
- County: Tomaszów
- Seat: Lubycza Królewska

Area
  - Total: 208.9 km^{2} (80.7 sq mi)

Population (2013)
  - Total: 6,487
  - Density: 31.05/km^{2} (80.43/sq mi)
- Website: https://www.lubycza.pl/

Gmina Lubycza Królewska is a rural gmina (administrative district) in Tomaszów County, Lublin Voivodeship, in eastern Poland, on the border with Ukraine. Its seat is the village of Lubycza Królewska, which lies approximately 16 kilometres (10 mi) south-east of Tomaszów Lubelski and 123 km (76 mi) south-east of the regional capital Lublin.

The gmina covers an area of 208.9 square kilometres (80.7 sq mi), and as of 2006 its total population is 7,115 (6,487 in 2013).

The gmina contains part of the protected area called South Roztocze Landscape Park.

== Villages ==
Gmina Lubycza Królewska contains the villages and settlements of Brzeziny, Bukowinka, Dęby, Gruszka, Hrebenne, Hrebenne-Osada, Huta Lubycka, Jalinka, Kniazie, Kornie, Łazowa, Lubycza Królewska, Mosty Małe, Mrzygłody Lubyckie, Myślatyn, Nowe Dyniska, Nowosiółki Kardynalskie, Nowosiółki Przednie, Nowy Machnów, Pawliszcze, Potoki, Ruda Lubycka, Ruda Żurawiecka, Ruda Żurawiecka-Osada, Rudki, Siedliska, Stary Machnów, Szalenik, Teniatyska, Wierzbica, Wólka Wierzbicka, Zatyle, Zatyle-Osada, Żurawce and Żurawce-Osada.

== Neighbouring gminas ==
Gmina Lubycza Królewska is bordered by the gminas of Bełżec, Horyniec-Zdrój, Jarczów, Narol, Tomaszów Lubelski and Ulhówek. It also borders Ukraine.
