= Bieniaszówka =

- Village
- Location within Poland
- Coordinates: 50°19′54″N 23°25′4″E
- Country: Poland
- Voivodeship: Subcarpathian
- County: Lubaczów
- Gmina: Narol

Bieniaszówka [bʲɛɲaˈʂufka] is a village in the administrative district of Gmina Narol, within Lubaczów County, Subcarpathian Voivodeship, in south-eastern Poland.
