= Wola Wielka, Lubaczów County =

Wola Wielka
- Village
- Location within Poland
- Coordinates: 50°18′36″N 23°23′36″E
- Country: Poland
- Voivodeship: Subcarpathian
- County: Lubaczów
- Gmina: Narol

Wola Wielka [ˈvɔla ˈvʲɛlka] is a village in the administrative district of Gmina Narol, within Lubaczów County, Subcarpathian Voivodeship, in south-eastern Poland.
