= Lubycza Królewska =

- Town
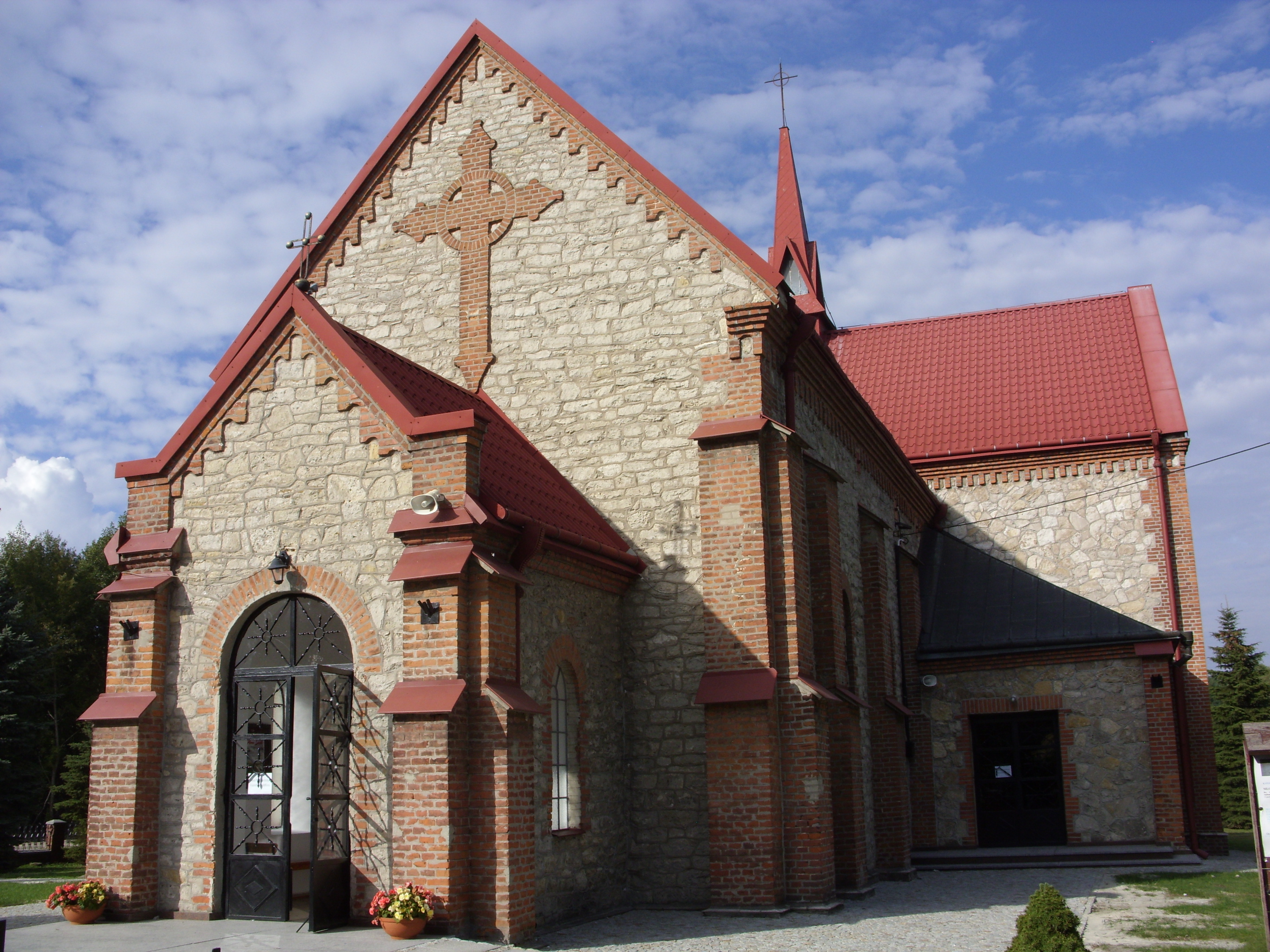
- Our Lady of the Rosary church in Lubycza Królewska

- Flag Coat of arms
- Interactive map of Lubycza Królewska
- Location within Poland
- Coordinates: 50°20′N 23°32′E
- Country: Poland
- Voivodeship: Lublin
- County: Tomaszów
- Gmina: Lubycza Królewska
- Town rights: 1759

Population
  - Total: 2,111
- Time zone: UTC+1 (CET)
  - Summer (DST): UTC+2 (CEST)
- Vehicle registration: LTM

Lubycza Królewska [luˈbɨt͡ʂa kruˈlɛfska] (Note: Ukrainian: Любича Королівська, Liubycha Korolivs’ka) is a town in Tomaszów County, Lublin Voivodeship, in south-eastern Poland, close to the border with Ukraine. It is the seat of the gmina (administrative district) called Gmina Lubycza Królewska. The town has an total population of 2,111.

== History ==
Lubycza Królewska was granted town rights in 1759. It was a royal town, administratively located in the Bełz Voivodeship in the Lesser Poland Province of the Kingdom of Poland. Following the late-18th-century Partitions of Poland, it was annexed by Austria, and formed part of Galicia. Following World War I, in 1918, Poland regained independence and control of Lubycza Królewska.

Following the German-Soviet invasion of Poland, which started World War II in September 1939, the town was first occupied by the Soviet Union until 1941 and then by Germany until 1944. Five local Polish policemen, including the chief and deputy chief, were murdered by the Russians in the Katyn massacre in 1940.
