= Potoki, Gmina Lubycza Królewska =

Potoki
- Village
- Location within Poland
- Coordinates: 50°18′N 23°32′E
- Country: Poland
- Voivodeship: Lublin
- County: Tomaszów
- Gmina: Lubycza Królewska
- Population: 165

Potoki [pɔˈtɔki] is a village in the administrative district of Gmina Lubycza Królewska, within Tomaszów County, Lublin Voivodeship, in eastern Poland, close to the border with Ukraine.
