= Rudki, Gmina Lubycza Królewska =

Rudki
- Village
- Location within Poland
- Coordinates: 50°19′22″N 23°27′2″E
- Country: Poland
- Voivodeship: Lublin
- County: Tomaszów
- Gmina: Lubycza Królewska

Rudki [ˈrutki] is a village in the administrative district of Gmina Lubycza Królewska, within Tomaszów County, Lublin Voivodeship, in eastern Poland, close to the border with Ukraine.
