= Lipsko, Podkarpackie Voivodeship =

Lipsko
- Village
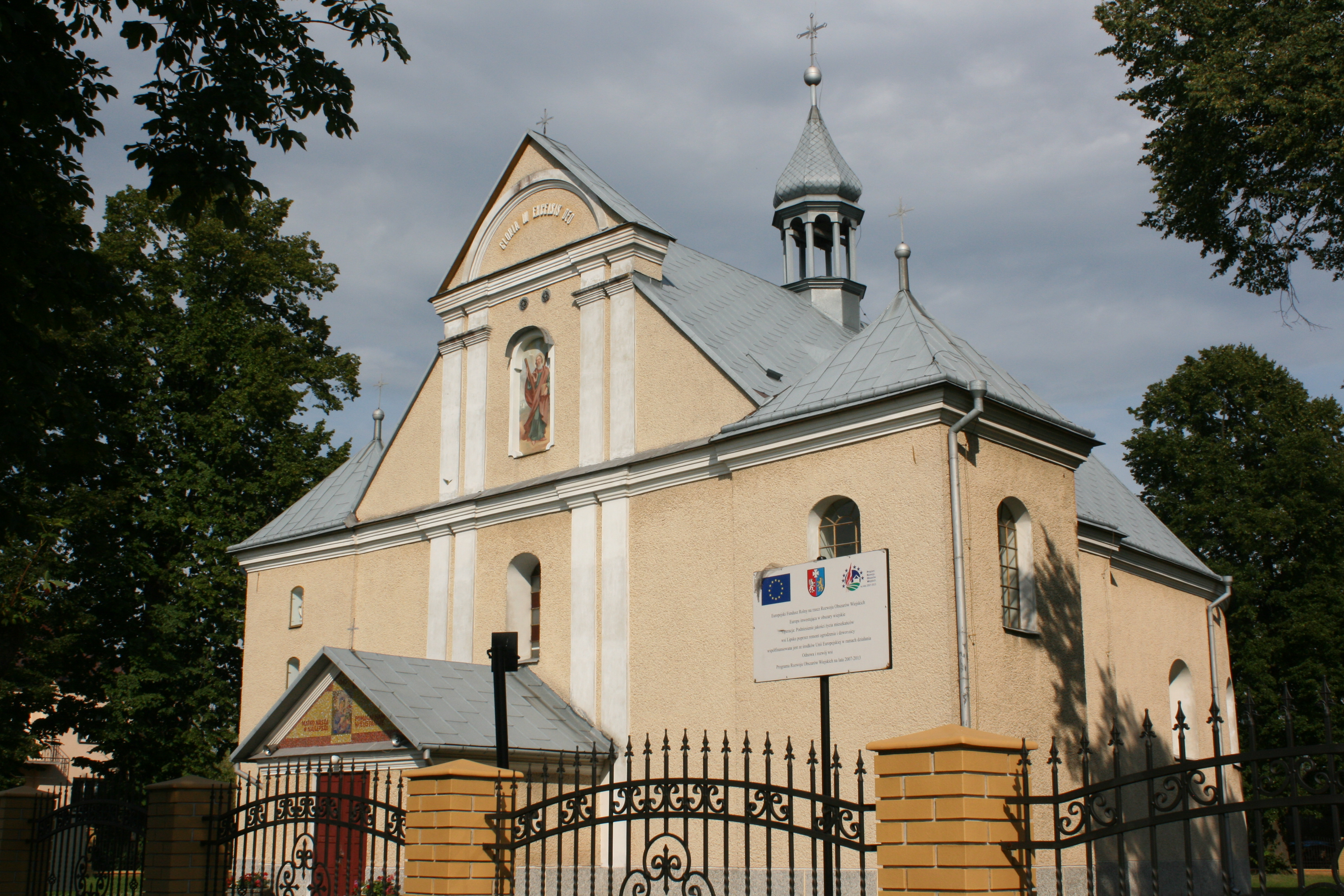
- Saint Andrew church in Lipsko

- Location within Poland
- Coordinates: 50°20′49″N 23°20′23″E
- Country: Poland
- Voivodeship: Subcarpathian
- County: Lubaczów
- Gmina: Narol
- Population: 365
- Time zone: UTC+1 (CET)
  - Summer (DST): UTC+2 (CEST)
- Vehicle registration: RLU

Lipsko [ˈlʲipskɔ] is a village in the administrative district of Gmina Narol, within Lubaczów County, Subcarpathian Voivodeship, in south-eastern Poland.
