= Huta Lubycka =

- Village
- Location within Poland
- Coordinates: 50°19′N 23°26′E
- Country: Poland
- Voivodeship: Lublin
- County: Tomaszów
- Gmina: Lubycza Królewska

Huta Lubycka [ˈxuta luˈbɨt͡ska] is a village in the administrative district of Gmina Lubycza Królewska, within Tomaszów County, Lublin Voivodeship, in eastern Poland, close to the border with Ukraine.
