= Rudaki, Iran =

Rudaki رودكي
- Village
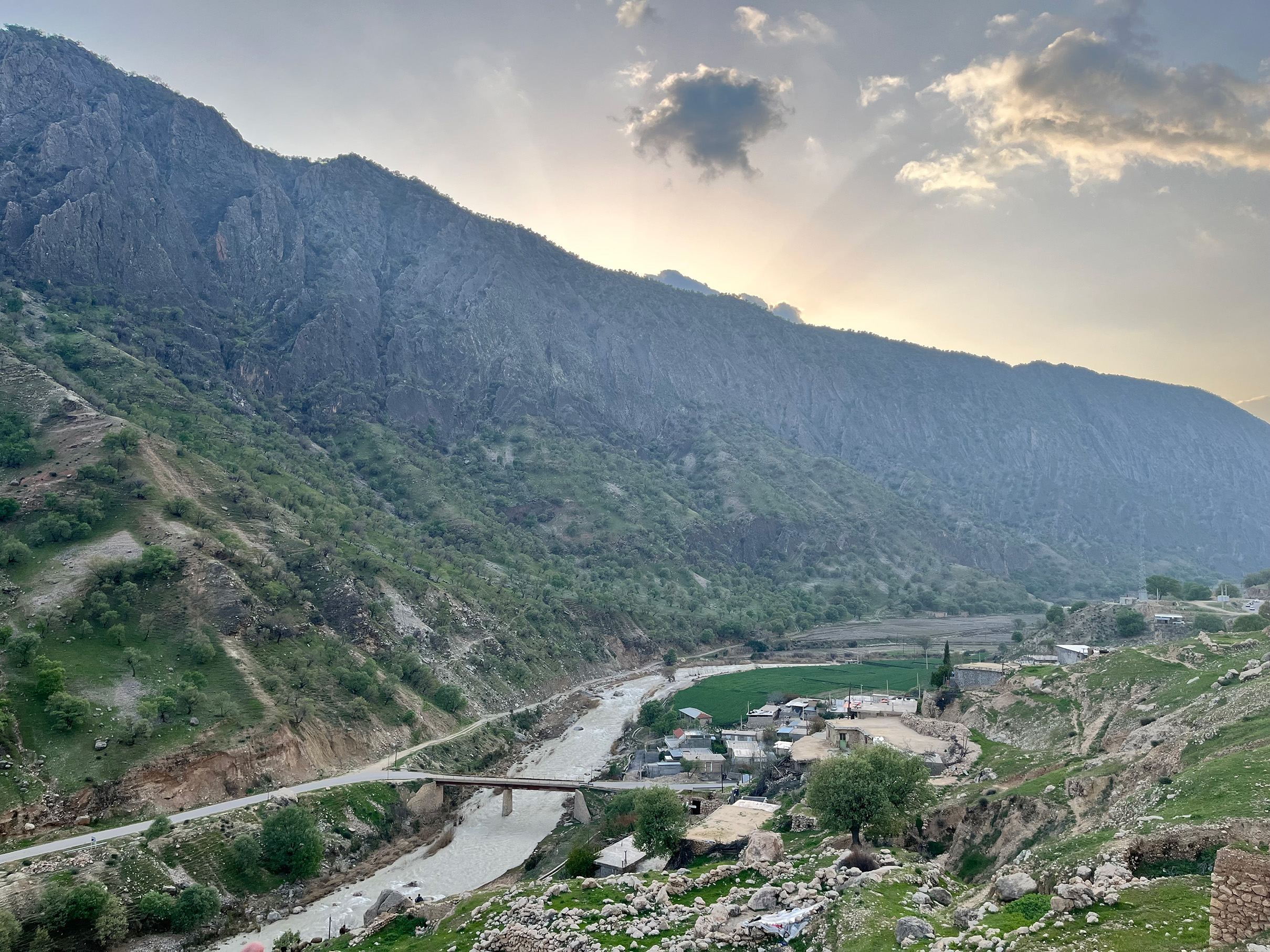

- Location within Iran
- Coordinates: 30°12′12″N 51°42′56″E
- Country: Iran
- Province: Fars
- County: Mamasani
- Bakhsh: Central
- Rural District: Jowzar

Population (2006)
  - Total: 139
- Time zone: UTC+3:30 (IRST)
  - Summer (DST): UTC+4:30 (IRDT)

Rudaki (Persian: رودكي, also Romanized as Rūdakī) is a village in Jowzar Rural District, in the Central District of Mamasani County, Fars province, Iran. At the 2006 census, its population was 139, in 30 families.
