= Łówcza =

- Village
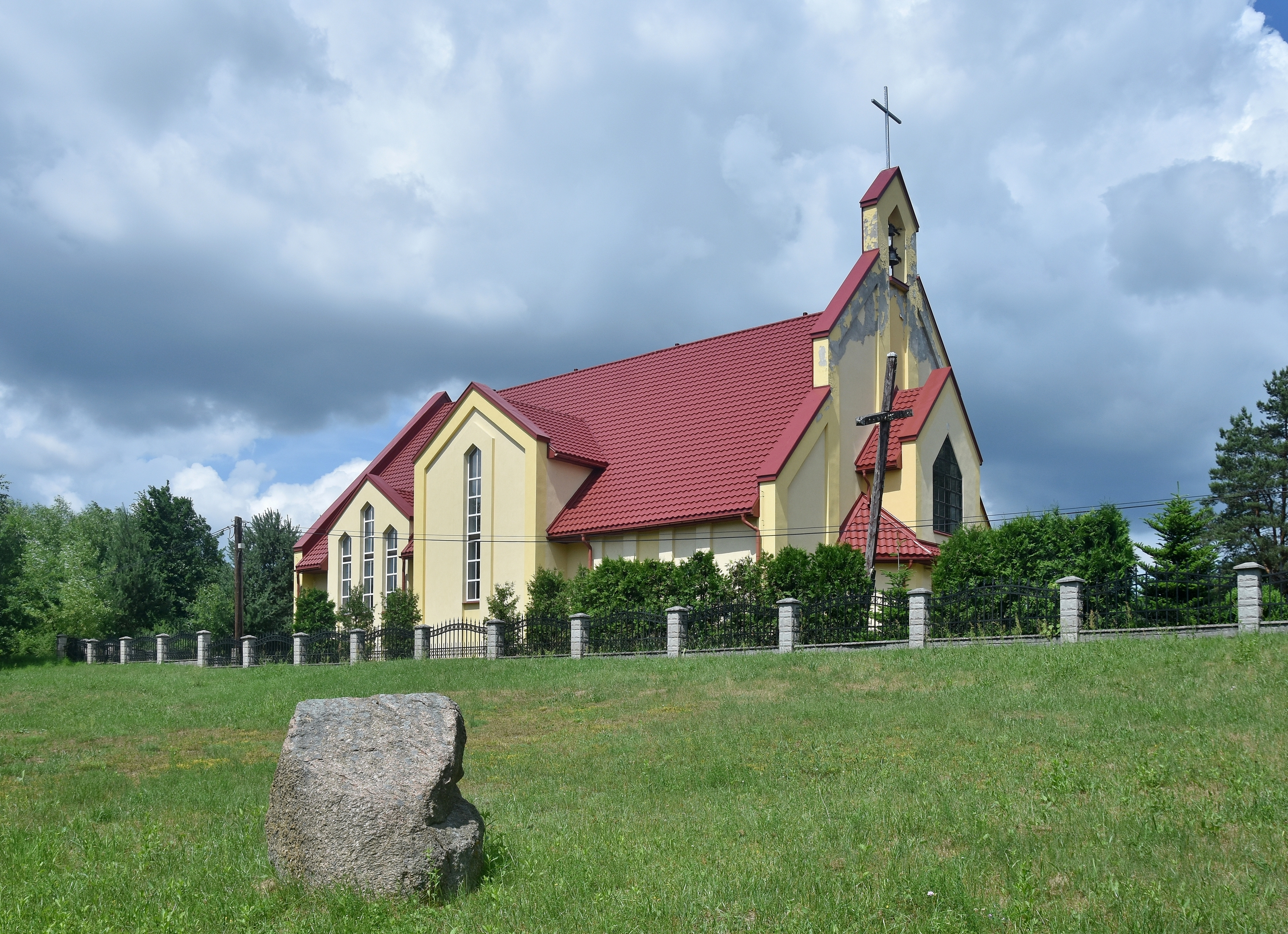
- A church in Łówcza

- Location within Poland
- Coordinates: 50°17′N 23°17′E
- Country: Poland
- Voivodeship: Subcarpathian
- County: Lubaczów
- Gmina: Narol

Łówcza [ˈwuft͡ʂa] is a village in the administrative district of Gmina Narol, within Lubaczów County, Subcarpathian Voivodeship, in south-eastern Poland.
