= Narol (Hasidic dynasty) =

Polish Hasidic dynasty

Narol is a dynasty of Hasidic rebbes originally based in the village of Narol, W. Galicia (now Poland).

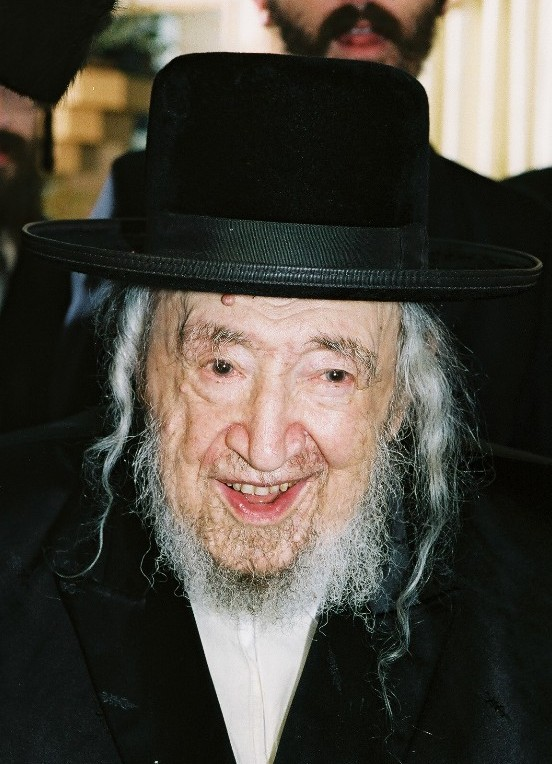
Rabbi Chaim Myer Yechiel Shapira of Narol

The Naroler dynasty was founded by Rabbi Yaakov Reinman (1778–1814) (b. 5538, d. 4 Tamuz 5574 on the Hebrew calendar), who served as rabbi of Radichow, Kozowa and Holishits before being appointed to the rabbinate of Narol.

The late Naroler Rebbe, Rabbi Chaim Myer Yechiel Shapira was born on the 20th of Elul 5667 (1907), and at the time of his death was one of the oldest living Hasidic rebbes. He was a Belzer chasid. In 1927, at the age of 20, he was appointed as the 5th Rabbi of Narol (see tree below). He married the daughter of Rabbi Meshulam Zalman Yosef Zilberfarb of Toporow (now Toporiv); they had a son Aharon and a daughter Malka who perished in World War II, and a son Dov Berish who is the present Naroler Rebbe.

He survived World War II in Siberia; then resided in Antwerp, Lower East Side, Manhattan, Crown Heights and finally, for the last 30 years of his life, in Bnei Brak, Israel. He died on 18 Tamuz 5767 (July 4, 2007) at the age of 99; having been the Naroler rebbe for 80 years.

The present Naroler Rebbe, Rabbi Berish Shapiro, is the only surviving son of Rabbi Chaim Myer Yechiel. He resided in the Gravesend section of Brooklyn, New York, but now lives in B'nei Brak, Israel. He is a prominent board member of Kolel Chibas Yerushalayim. His son, Rabbi Osher Shapiro, is active in the Jewish community of Stamford Hill, London. The UK Mincha Guide is just one of his projects. Other children of the Naroler Rebbe include Rabbis Aharon Shapiro, Naroler Rav, and Zalman Shapiro, and the Koidanover Rebbetzin.

Other descendants of the Narol dynasty include Rabbi Yaakov Yosef Reinman, an acclaimed scholar and author, and son of Rabbi Arye Leib Reinman of Narol.

== Lineage of Narol dynasty ==
- Rebbe Yaakov Reinman (1778–1814), first Naroler Rebbe, disciple of Rabbi Shlomo of Skohl and Rabbi Menachem Mendel of Rimanov
  - Rebbe Avrohom Reinman of Narol (1796–1841), son of Rebbe Yaakov, disciple of Rebbe Tsvi Hirsh of Zidichov
    - Rebbe Yitschok Meshulom Zalman of Narol (1817–1886), son of Rabbi Berish Naimark of Hrubieszów and son-in-law of Rebbe Avrohom, disciple of Rebbe Sholom of Belz
      - Rebbe Shulem (1856–1927) AB"D Narol, son of Rebbe Yitschok Meshulom Zalman and son-in-law of Rabbi Shmuel Aharon AB"D Korczyn
        - Rabbi Dov Berish (d. 1919), son of Rebbe Shulem, son-in-law of Rabbi Chaim Myer Yechiel Ungar of Radichov
          - Rebbe Chaim Myer Yechiel Shapira (1907–2007), son of Rabbi Dov Berish
            - Rebbe Dov Berish Shapira - present Naroler Rebbe, son of Rebbe Chaim Myer Yechiel
        - Rabbi Chaim Reinman ABD Narol, son of Rebbe Shulem, perished in Holocaust
          - Rabbi Arye Leib Reinman, moved to US
            - Rabbi Yaakov Yosef Reinman
