= Złomy Ruskie =

Złojec
- Village
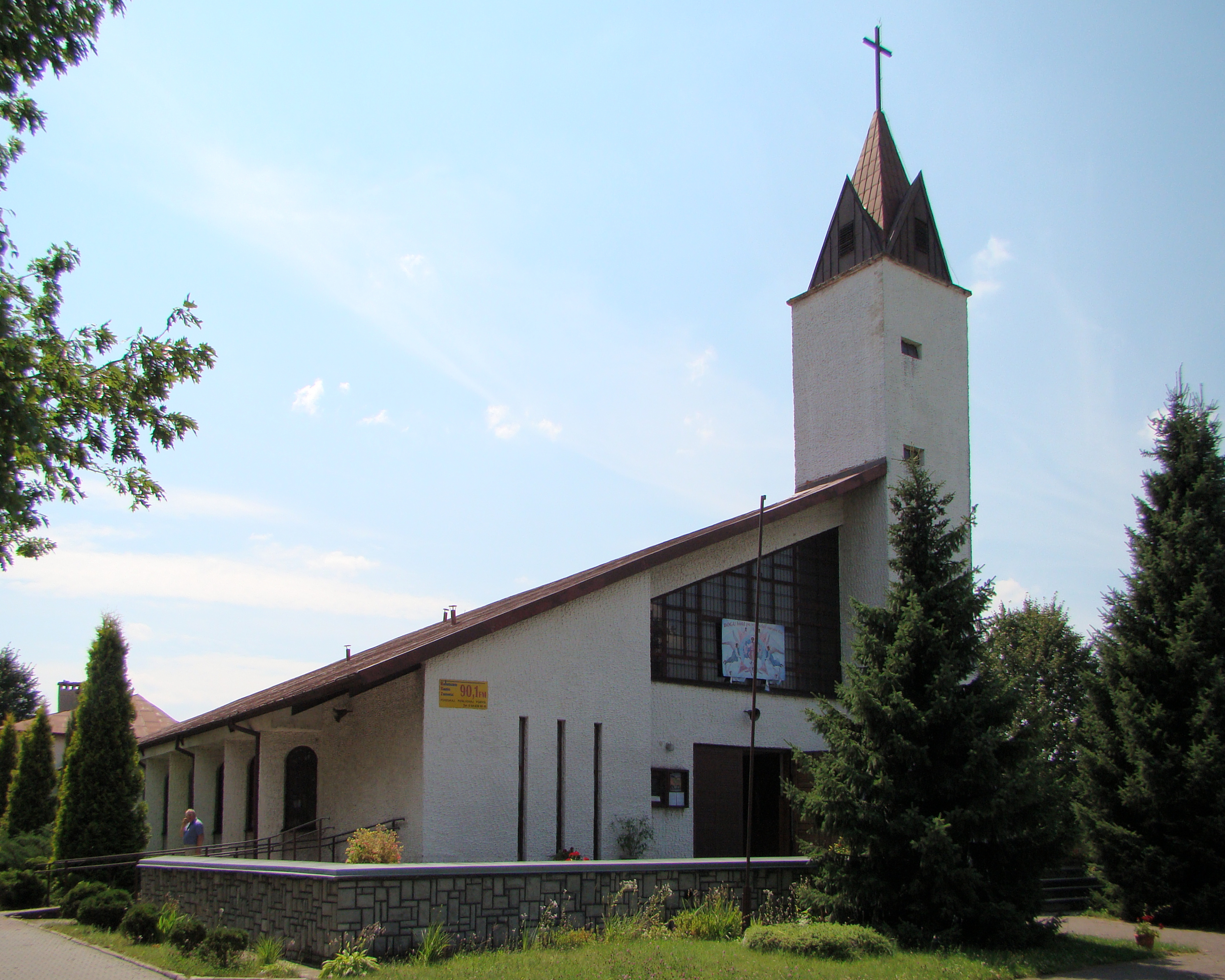
- Christ the King church in Złojec

- Location within Poland
- Coordinates: 50°46′N 23°7′E
- Country: Poland
- Voivodeship: Lublin
- County: Zamość
- Gmina: Nielisz

Złojec [ˈzwɔjɛt͡s] is a village in the administrative district of Gmina Nielisz, within Zamość County, Lublin Voivodeship, in eastern Poland.
