= Brzeziny, Gmina Lubycza Królewska =

Brzeziny
- Village
- Location within Poland
- Coordinates: 50°21′24″N 23°25′9″E
- Country: Poland
- Voivodeship: Lublin
- County: Tomaszów
- Gmina: Lubycza Królewska
- Population: 350

Brzeziny [bʐɛˈʑinɨ] is a village in the administrative district of Gmina Lubycza Królewska, within Tomaszów County, Lublin Voivodeship, in eastern Poland, close to the border with Ukraine.
