= Łowcza =

- Village
- Location within Poland
- Coordinates: 51°20′N 23°28′E
- Country: Poland
- Voivodeship: Lublin
- County: Chełm
- Gmina: Sawin

Łowcza [ˈwɔft͡ʂa] is a village in the administrative district of Gmina Sawin, within Chełm County, Lublin Voivodeship, in eastern Poland.
