= Chambul =

Tatar military unit

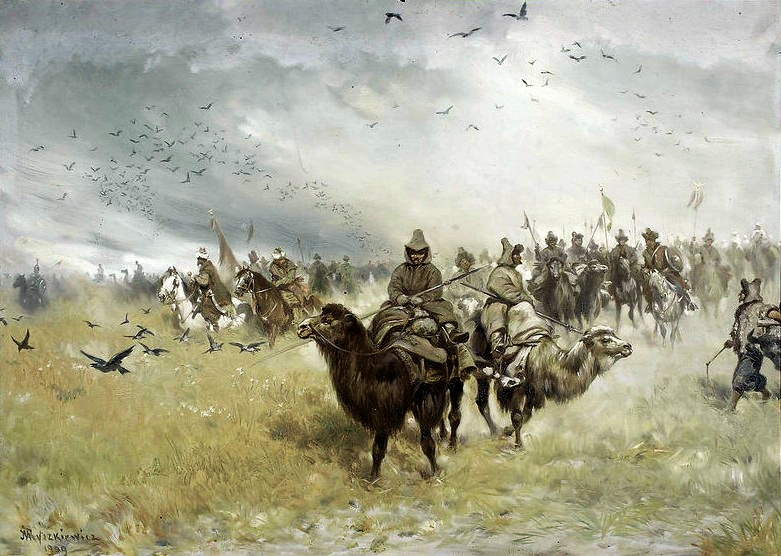
The painting by Józef Ryszkiewicz, depicting the chambul.

Chambul was a type of unit used by the Tatar soldiers, mainly by Crimean Khanate and Minor Tartary. It was used, by breaking off of the main army, and attacking the opponent forces within their territory, in order to make a diversion for the main forces, as well as to establish a holdout and gain the spoils of war, including slaves.
