= Narol, Poland =

Town in Podkarpackie Voivodeship, Poland

Narol
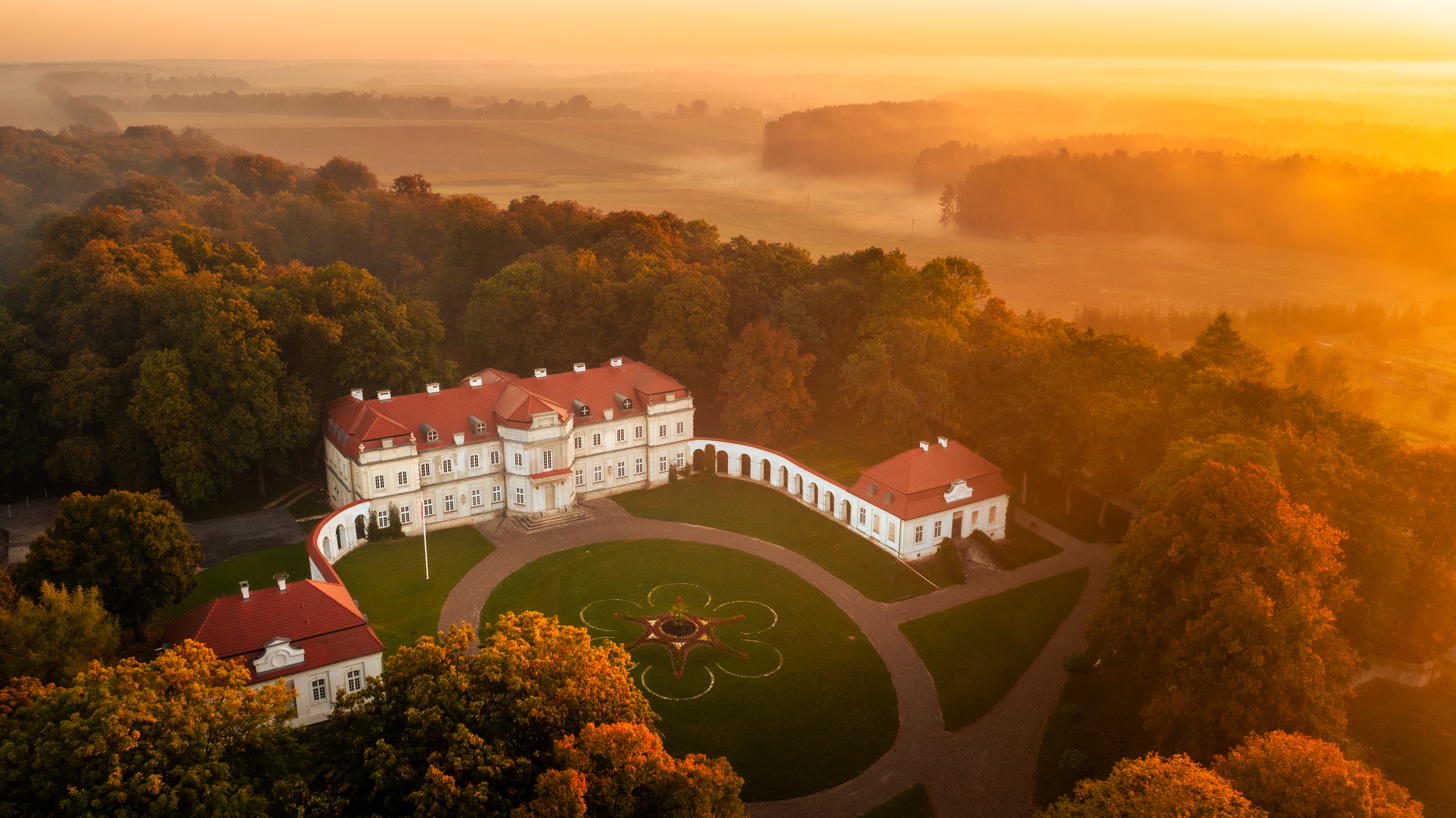
- Palace of Count Łoś in Narol

- Coat of arms
- Interactive map of Narol
- Location within Poland
- Coordinates: 50°20′55″N 23°19′38″E
- Country: Poland
- Voivodeship: Subcarpathian
- County: Lubaczów
- Gmina: Narol

Government
  - Mayor: Arkadiusz Mroczek

Area
  - Total: 12.4 km^{2} (4.8 sq mi)

Population (2006)
  - Total: 2,120
  - Density: 171/km^{2} (443/sq mi)
- Time zone: UTC+1 (CET)
  - Summer (DST): UTC+2 (CEST)
- Postal code: 37-610
- Vehicle registration: RLU
- Website: www.narol.pl

Narol [ˈnarɔl] is a town in Subcarpathian Voivodeship, in Lubaczów County, in south-eastern Poland. It had a population of 2,109 as of 2009. Narol is situated in the northeast of the Subcarpathian Voivodeship, in an area called Narolszczyzna.

== History ==
=== Early history ===
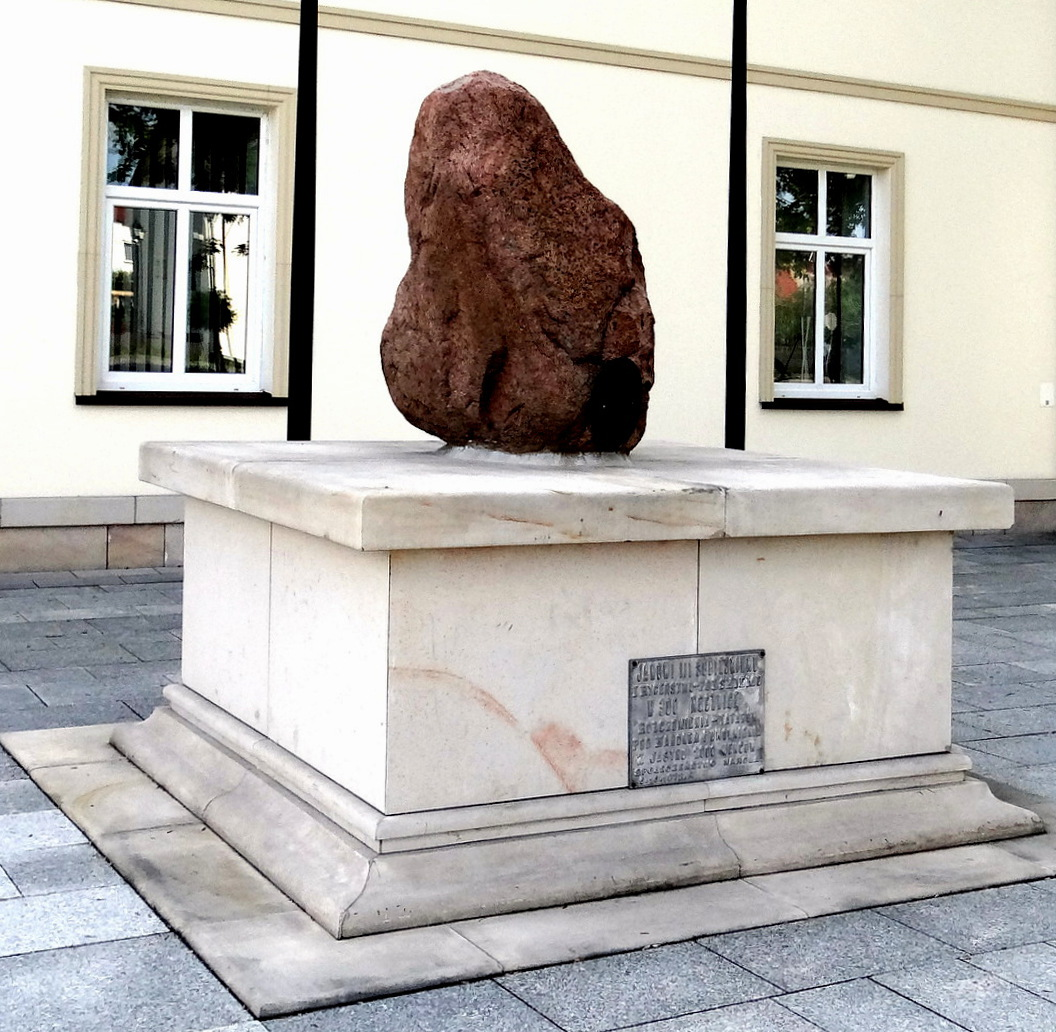
A monument in honor of John III Sobieski, commemorating the victory over the invading Tatars

The Bełżecki family owned the area where the town of Narol is situated. At the end of the 15th century the lands changed ownership to the Marcinkowski Family. Narol was first called Florianów, from the name of Florian Łaszcz Nieledowski, who founded the town in 1596. Narol flourished because of trade with Gdańsk.

The army of the Cossack Bohdan Khmelnytsky attacked the town on their way to Zamość. After a few days of siege, the town was overrun and burned to the ground by Khmelnytsky's forces. Twenty thousand people died during those fights, among them Florian Łaszcz, the owner of the town. A new town was built, somewhat west of the original location, "on a field" - hence "na roli". The new settlement assumed the new name Narol. In 1672 Great Crown Hetman and future King of Poland, John Sobieski, won a battle against the Tatars nearby.

=== Count Łoś ===
In 1758 Felix Anthony Łoś (1737–1804) became the owner of Narol and a deputy and a general of the king's army. He opened a factory and a school in Narol. In 1776, he began constructing a palace in the form of a horseshoe (the coat of arms of Łoś family).

Near the palace there was an Italian style garden. Count Łoś was an avid collector of old writings, correspondence and manuscripts, and paintings of the Italian and Dutch schools. He accumulated one of the largest libraries in Poland at that time. He founded a drama and music school for children from more affluent families, which was located on premises of the palace. The palace was considered one of the most beautiful palaces in the whole country. After the death of Count Łoś, all of the collection was lost, with most of the library ending up in the hands of Count Jakub Potocki. In 1935 the books were donated to a public library in Warsaw.

=== 19th and 20th centuries ===
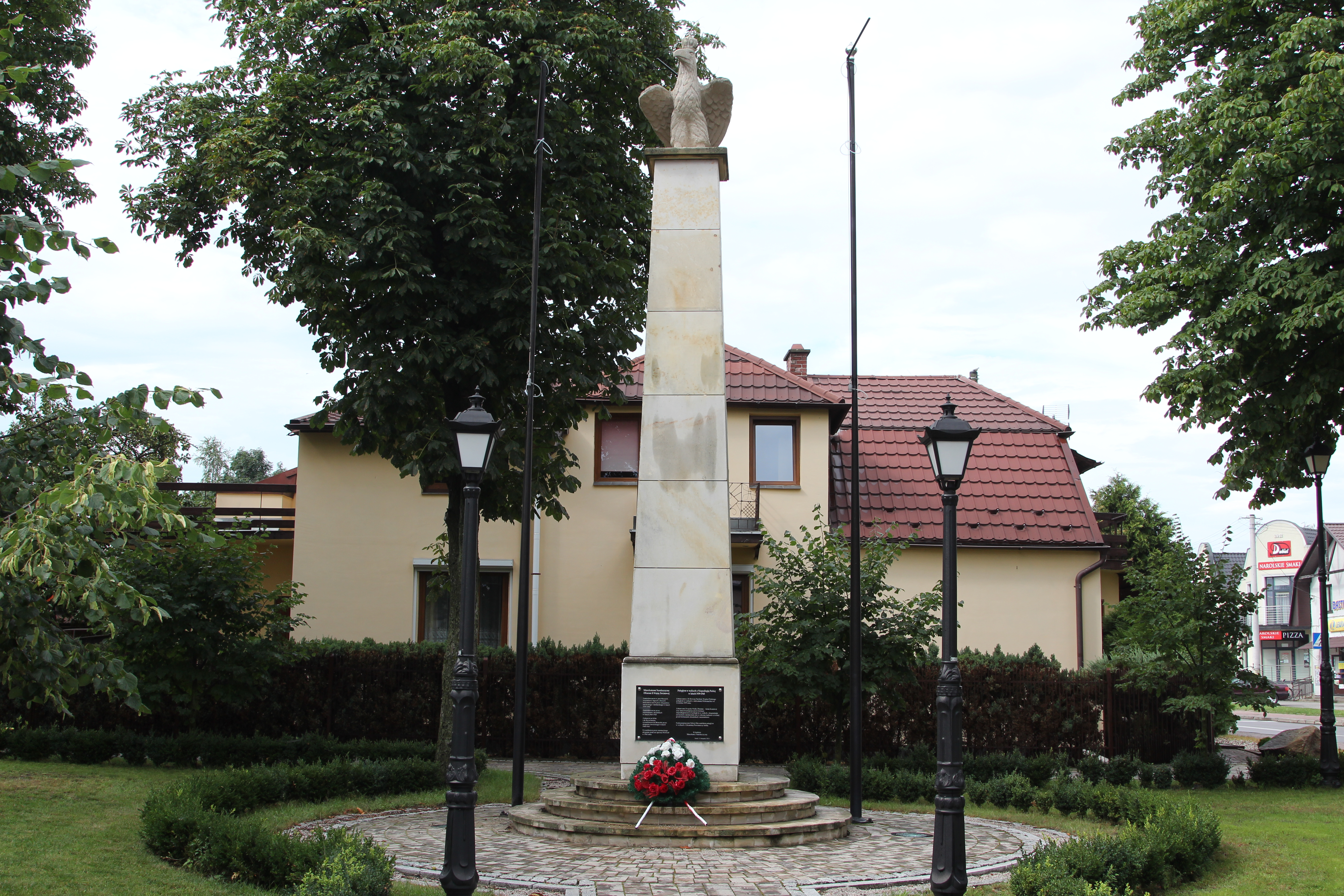
Monument to Polish soldiers, partisans and victims of World War II

During the January Uprising (1863), the Palace in Narol was burned down by the Austrian army. Julian Puzyna, its later owner, rebuilt it. But during World War I, Narol was burned down again and all the valuable things in the palace were removed by the Russian Army. The last owner was Jadwiga Korytowska. She rebuilt parts of the palace and owned it until September 1939. During the German occupation in World War II, a small German Wehrmacht detachment was stationed in the palace.

After World War II the palace was robbed and destroyed by the Red Army. The land was nationalized by the Soviet-installed communist government and divided between "The National Fund for Land", "The State Forests", and "The State Agricultural Farm". They took over the remains of the palace and used it as storage space for fertilizers. PGR (State Agricultural Farm) was assumed by the company "IGLOOPOL" and another organization. Following the downfall of "IGLOOPOL" the property was taken over by the National Farming Agency.

In 1995 the palace and its surroundings became private property again. It now belongs to a Foundation, "Pro Academia Narolense", which was established to help reconstruct the palace. It now serves as a retreat for nationally renowned artists.

== Notable people ==
- Moshe Yirmiya Hakohen, Born in Kremnitz, was the town rabbi in Narol until the Pogroms of 1648 and then chief rabbi of Metz in France. Author of "Birkas Tov".
- Moses Kohn, Polish Jewish physician
- Nathan Handwerker, born in shtetl that formerly abutted Christian portion of the town. Founder of Nathan's Famous.
- Tobias Cohn (Polish: Tobiasz Kohn, Toviyyah ben Moshe ha-Kohen) (1652–1729), a Polish-Jewish physician; born at Metz
- Narol dynasty and Shapira rabbinic family
- Simon Federbusch, rabbi in Poland, Finland, and America.
