= Polish–Ukrainian conflict (1939–1947) =

1939–1947 ethnic conflict

Polish-Ukrainian conflict
- Part of the Eastern Front of World War II and the Polish resistance movement in World War II
Date	1939–1947 (minor fighting continued until 1948)
Location	South-eastern Poland (Kresy)
Result	Inconclusive (See § Aftermath)
Territorial changes	Establishment of the Polish–Soviet border on the Curzon Line; Population exchange between Poland and Soviet Ukraine; Liquidation of UPA remnants in the post-war Poland after Operation Vistula

Belligerents
Second Republic of Poland; Polish Underground State; Polish People's Republic; Soviet Union Polish collaborators	OUN; Ukrainian Insurgent Army (Ukraine) Polissian Sich Ukrainian collaborators

Commanders and leaders
(Poland) Stefan Dembiński; (Poland) Edward Śmigły-Rydz; (Polish Underground State) Stefan Rowecki; (Polish Underground State) Leopold Okulicki; (Polish Underground State) Władysław Kochański (WIA); (Polish Underground State) Henryk Cybulski; (Polish Underground State) Stefan Czerwiński; (Polish Underground State) Kazimierz Bąbiński; (Polish Underground State) Jan Kotowicz; (Polish Underground State) Kazimierz Filipowicz; (Polish Underground State) Antoni Rychel †; (Polish Underground State) Zdzisław Ostromęcki †; (Polish Underground State) Stefan Kwaśniewski; (Polish Underground State) Franciszek Studziński; (Polish Underground State) Władysław Herman; (Polish Underground State) Henryk Krajewski; (Polish Underground State) Józef Biss; Stanisław Basaj †; Antoni Żubryd; Stefan Mossor; Franciszek Jóźwiak; Karol Świerczewski †; Michał Rola-Żymierski; Marian Spychalski; Nikolai Vatutin †; Timofei Strokach; Pavel Sudoplatov; Vladimir Trubnikov; Vasyl Ryasnoy; Sergey Savchenko; Nikolai Kovalchuk; Viktor Drozdov; Alexei Asmolov	Andriy Melnyk; Roman Sushko; Wilhelm Canaris; Dmytro Klyachkivskyi; Maryan Lukasevych †; Vasyl Kuk; Vasyl Sydor; Oleksandr Hasyn; Petro Oliynyk; Ivan Lytvynchuk; Oleksandr Lutskyi; Mykola Kozak; Mykola Lebed; Vasyl Halasa; Stepan Stebelskyi; Yuriy Stelmashchuk; Maksym Skorupskyi; Mykhailo Soltys; Ivan Shpontak; Volodymyr Shchyhelskyi (executed); Myroslav Onyshkevych (executed); (Ukraine) Petro Dolmatyuk; (Ukraine) Ivan Mitrynga

Units involved
Second Republic of Poland (1939): Polish Armed Forces; Home Army: 27th Volhynian Infantry Division; Polish Self Defence Groups in Volhynia; Peasant Battalions: Ryś Battalion; National Armed Forces: „Zuch” Battalion; Polish People's Republic: People's Guard; Polish People's Army; Operational Group "Rzeszów"; Operational Group "Vistula"; Ministry of Public Security (Poland); Citizens Militia; Soviet Union: NKVD; Red Army; Internal Security Corps; Ministry of State Security (Soviet Union); Soviet Partisan Groups in Volhynia; Polish collaborationist units: Schutzmannschaft Battalion 202; Schutzmannschaft Battalion 107; Polish Auxiliary Police	OUN: Bergbauernhilfe; Poliske Lozove Kozatstvo; Ukrainian Insurgent Army: Sluzhba Bezpeky; Ukrainian Revolutionary Front; Ukrainian People's Self-Defense; Self-defense Kushch Units; Ukrainian collaborationist units: Schutzmannschaft Battalion 118; 14th Waffen Grenadier Division of the SS (1st Galician); 4th SS Police Regiment (Galician); 5th SS Police Regiment (Galician); Ukrainian Auxiliary Police; Ukrainian Legion of Self-Defense

Strength
Second Republic of Poland: 2,500 troops; Home Army: 40,000–50,000 troops; Polish People's Republic: 20,000–30,000 troops	OUN: 7,729 troops; Ukrainian Auxiliary Police: 50,000–70,000 troops; (Ukraine) Polissian Sich: 3,000–5,000; Ukrainian Insurgent Army (1941–1947): 25,000–100,000 troops

Casualties and losses
1945–1947: 8,100 killed 5,000 killed	1945–1947: 8,700 killed
- See civil casualties in: Aftermath

The Polish–Ukrainian conflict was an ethnic conflict during the Second World War. Fighting, which would continue after the end of the war in 1945, concluded in 1947. It was fought primarily between irregular Ukrainian and Polish units, with limited participation by Soviet partisans and the Red Army, as well as Romanian, Hungarian, German and Czechoslovak armed formations. Fighting was concentrated in the south-eastern Kresy region (today Western Ukraine) of the German-occupied Second Polish Republic.

The occupation of Poland by Germany and the Soviet Union in September 1939 led to demands by Ukrainian nationalists for a new Ukrainian state which would include the Polish territories of Eastern Galicia and Volhynia.

== Background ==
=== Ukrainian radical nationalism ===
In 1920, exiled Ukrainian officers, mostly former Sich Riflemen and veterans of the Polish–Ukrainian War, founded the Ukrainian Military Organization (UVO), an underground military organization with the goal of continuing the armed struggle for independent Ukraine. In the second half of 1922, UVO organized a wave of sabotage actions and assassination attempts on Polish officials and moderate Ukrainian activists. In 1929, the Organization of Ukrainian Nationalists (OUN) was formed in Vienna by a union between several radical nationalist and extreme right-wing organisations and the UVO. Members of the organization carried out several acts of terror and assassinations in Poland, but it was a fringe movement, condemned for its violence by figures from mainstream Ukrainian society such as the head of the Ukrainian Greek Catholic Church, Andriy Sheptytsky. The most popular political party among Ukrainians was the Ukrainian National Democratic Alliance (UNDO), which was opposed to Polish rule but called for peaceful and democratic means to achieve independence from Poland.

By the beginning of the Second World War, OUN membership had risen to 20,000 active members, and the number of supporters was several times as many.

=== Polish policy towards Ukrainian minority ===
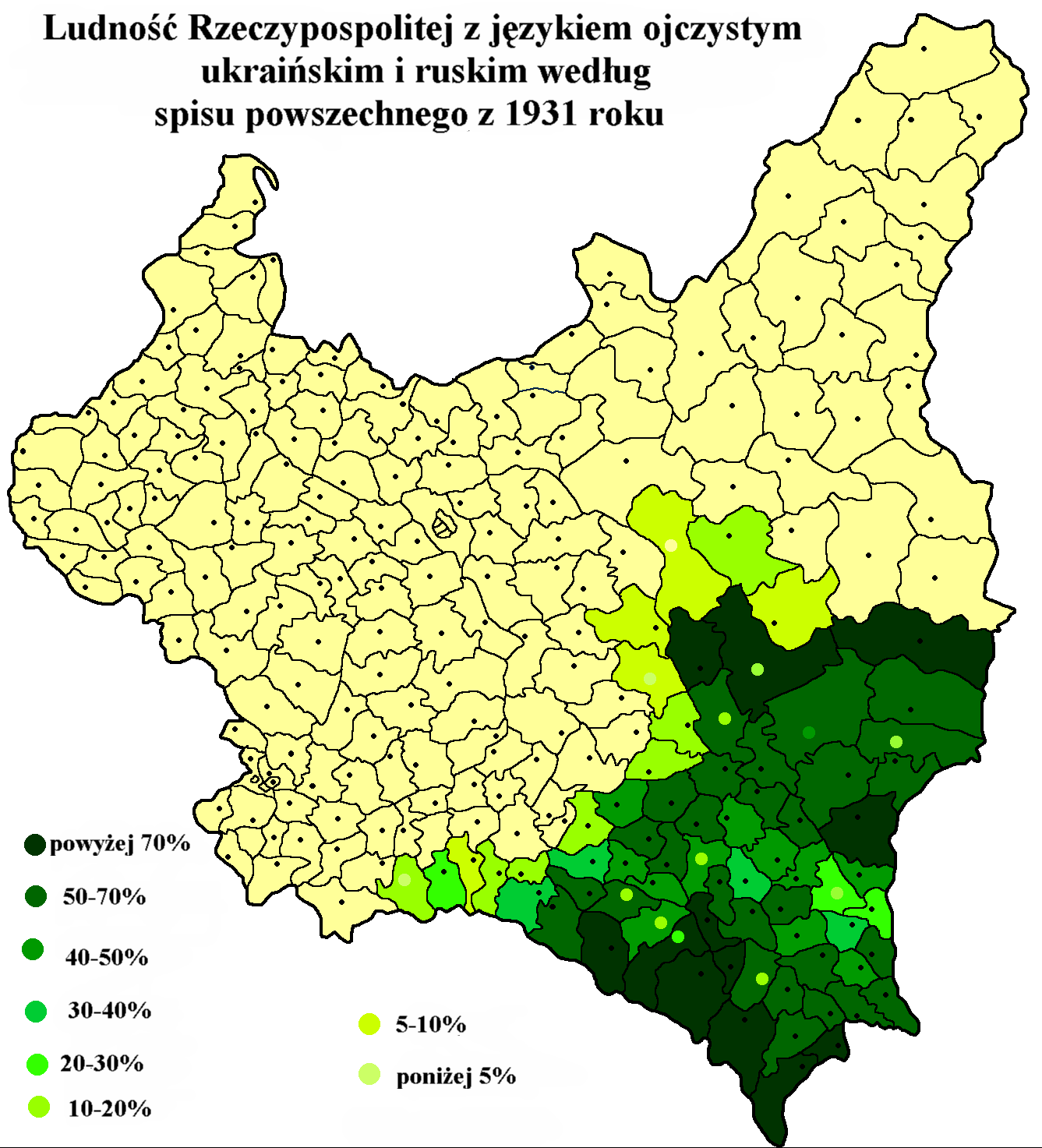
Percentage of Ukrainian-speakers in Poland's counties according to the 1931 Polish census

The policy of the Polish authorities towards the Ukrainian minority was changeable throughout the interwar period, varying between attempts at assimilation, conciliation and a policy of repression.

In 1930, a terror campaign and civil unrest in the Galician countryside resulted in Polish police exacting a policy of collective responsibility on local Ukrainians in an effort to "pacify" the region. Ukrainian parliamentarians were placed under house arrest to prevent them from participating in elections, with their constituents terrorized into voting for Polish candidates. Beginning in 1937, the Polish government in Volhynia initiated an active campaign to use religion as a tool for Polonization and to convert the Orthodox population to Roman Catholicism. Over 190 Orthodox churches were destroyed and 150 converted to Roman Catholic churches.

Just before the Soviet invasion of Poland, Volhynia was "the site of one of eastern Europe's most ambitious policies of toleration". By conducting Volhynia Experiment through supporting Ukrainian culture and religious autonomy and the Ukrainization of the Orthodox Church, the Sanacja regime wanted to achieve Ukrainian loyalty to the Polish state and to minimise Soviet influences in the border region. That approach was gradually abandoned after Józef Piłsudski's death in 1935. Practically all government and administrative positions, including the police, were assigned to Poles.

After the assassination of Bronisław Pieracki in 1934, an internment camp was established in Bereza Kartuska, where opponents of the Polish government, including members of the OUN, were detained.

Harsh policies implemented by the Second Polish Republic were often a response to OUN violence but contributed to a further deterioration of relations between the two groups. Between 1921 and 1938, Polish colonists and war veterans were encouraged to settle in the Volhynian and Galician countrysides. Their number reached 17,700 across 3,500 new settlements in Volhynia by 1939. Between 1934 and 1938, several violent and sometimes-deadly clashes occurred. In one such incident, the Papal Nuncio in Warsaw reported that Polish mobs attacked Ukrainian students in their dormitory under the eyes of Polish police, a screaming Ukrainian woman was thrown into a burning Ukrainian store by Polish mobs and a Ukrainian seminary was destroyed during which religious icons were desecrated and eight people were hospitalized with serious injuries and two killed. Attacks against Ukrainians were conducted in other parts of Poland. Volhynia was a place of increasingly violent conflict, with Polish police on one side and Western Ukrainian communists supported by many dissatisfied Ukrainian peasants on the other. The communists organized strikes, killed at least 31 suspected police informers in 1935–1936, and assassinated local Ukrainian officials for "collaboration" with the Polish government. The police conducted mass arrests, reported the killing of 18 communists in 1935 and killed at least 31 people in gunfights and arrest attempts in 1936.

== September 1939 ==
Just before Germany invaded Poland, Germany established contacts with the OUN, which had been abandoned in the mid-1930s. The result of this cooperation was the establishment of the Bergbauernhilfe in 1938. This unit was to be transported to Galicia, to the rear of the Polish army, in order to spark an anti-Polish uprising. This plan lost its relevance after the signing of the Molotov–Ribbentrop Pact on 24 August 1939. However, after the German army reached the outskirts of Lviv on 12 September 1939, an anti-Polish action was launched by Ukrainian militias affiliated with the OUN. Polish services, including soldiers, were attacked, and Stryi was briefly occupied. However, a swift Polish counteraction prevented the action from spreading. Similar action was taken by communist-linked militias after 17 September—the Soviet invasion of Poland—throughout Kresy, particularly in Polesia and Volhynia. Ukrainian nationalists took up the fight again, often collaborating with the Soviets. Polish manors in particular were attacked, and landowners were killed. Particularly bloody were the actions of the Hryhoriy Goliash "Bey" unit in Brzeżany and Podhajce counties, which carried out massacres of a number of villages: Koniuchy, Potutorów, Sławentyn, Jakubowce, and others, claiming lives of a couple of hundred Poles. Where the Polish army could, it fought the militia, often taking brutal revenge, burning villages from which shots were fired and killing people caught with weapons.

Several thousand militiamen took part in actions against Poland in September 1939, killing at least 2,000 people in Eastern Galicia and about a thousand in Volhynia. (Note: Rafał Wnuk writes that the OUN killed several thousand civilians in an anti-Polish action after Eastern Galicia was captured by German forces during the invasion of Poland. According to Karol Grünberg and Bolesław Sprengel, in September 1939, around 750 Poles were killed by Ukrainians in the Tarnopol Voivodeship alone. Roger D. Petersen states that during the early weeks of Soviet military control, several thousand individuals lost their lives in local violence, the majority of whom were Poles who fell victim to attacks carried out by Ukrainians.) Polish counteractions claimed several hundred casualties. At the same time, about 110,000 Ukrainians served in the Polish army, of whom 7,000–8,000 lost their lives in the fight against the Germans.

== 1942 escalation ==
At the Second Conference of the OUN-B in April 1942, Ukrainian nationalists advocated "the pacification of Polish-Ukrainian relations" with regard to the Poles "on the platform of independent states and the recognition and respect of the rights of the Ukrainian people to Western Ukrainian lands." At the same time, the OUN continued to fight against "the chauvinistic sentiments of the Poles and their appetites for Western Ukrainian lands, against anti-Ukrainian intrigues and attempts by the Poles to occupy important spheres of the economic and administrative apparatus of the Western Ukrainian lands at the cost of the exclusion of Ukrainians."

The roots of these events can be traced back to the ethnic cleansing of the Zamość region from November 1942 until March 1943, when the Germans, having expelled both Poles and Ukrainians, settled the latter in the Polish villages of the Hrubieszów district (during so-called Ukraineraktion in January–March 1943). In response to this, among other things, Polish partisans from the Home Army and Peasant Battalions began to attack representatives of the Ukrainian rural intelligentsia and ordinary peasants. Andrzej Leon Sowa described the settlement of Ukrainians in these villages as an "effective German provocation" aimed at escalating ethnic conflicts in their occupied territories.

In the village of Obórki, Lutsk district, on 13–14 November 1942, 53 Polish residents were murdered. Although the murders were committed by Nazi punitive forces, the Polish community erroneously blamed Ukrainian nationalists. Such incidents were enough to fuel intense hostility between Poles and Ukrainians.

The events in the Zamość region were a fragment of the wider Polish-Ukrainian conflict, which had moved into the area from Volhynia and Eastern Galicia. Its substrate was primarily Ukrainian independence aspirations. The Ukrainian Insurgent Army (UPA), formed in 1942 and fighting Polish and Soviet partisans, set about exterminating Poles and forcing them through terror to leave the disputed lands.

In the summer of 1942, negotiations took place in Lviv between members of the OUN and the Polish underground. Both sides agreed on the need to jointly fight against the Soviet and Nazi occupants. However, the Polish side was unwilling to guarantee the independence and recognition of western Ukraine, and the Polish government in London decided to take a wait-and-see approach. According to documents from the OUN Report, in late 1942, the occupation forces carried out a reign of terror against the Ukrainian population of Polesia and Volhynia, assisted by Poles who reported the Ukrainian population for collaborating with Soviet partisans.

Some of the local Polish population believed that, due to the collaboration of some Ukrainians with the Nazi regime, the Ukrainian population should be deported to Soviet Ukraine after the war. This view was shared by the local Home Army command, but the Polish authorities in Warsaw and London took a more moderate stance.

== Hrubieszów, Tomaszów and Lubaczów counties in 1943 ==
=== Causes of the conflict ===
At the beginning of 1944, dramatic events took place on the left bank of the Bug, in the districts of Hrubieszów, Tomaszów and Lubaczów. From January of that year until the end of the German occupation, the Home Army, People's Guard, National Armed Forces and Peasant Battalions fought against the UPA.

=== Local skirmishes ===
From 1942, there were cases of murder of Ukrainian activists and landlords by Polish partisan units in the Zamość region. These were not mass crimes but instead executions carried out on designated individuals. Later, there began to be more massive robbery attacks on villages originally inhabited by Poles, to which the German authorities brought Ukrainians. Sporadic killings of these then occurred; 32 people were killed in this way during the whole year. The first mass attack against a larger group of Ukrainians occurred on 26 July 1943 in Bukovina, when the Polish Army's NOW-AK unit led by Franciszek Przysiężniak killed 10 Ukrainians in retaliation for an earlier crime against Poles committed in the same village by the Ukrainian Auxiliary Police.

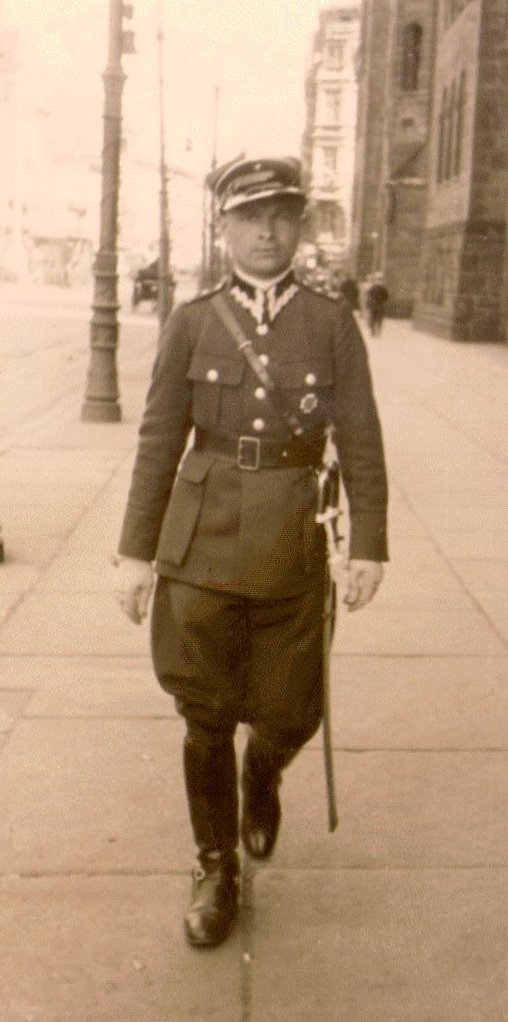
Antoni Rychel, commander of Polish self-defence units in southeastern Poland

A decisive change in tactics towards the Ukrainians occurred after more refugees from Volhynia, engulfed by the anti-Polish purge carried out by the Ukrainian Insurgent Army, arrived in Zamość. In the autumn of 1943, Polish partisan units began a series of attacks on Ukrainian Auxiliary Police posts. On the night of 23–24 October, the posts in Łukowa and Księżpol were attacked. Only the first of these actions was successful, during which the Home Army lost two soldiers but captured the post, killing 11 policemen and 2 German gendarmes. On the same day, an unspecified group composed of Poles looted the Ukrainian village of Aleksandrów. The aforementioned activities of the Polish partisans caused panic among the Ukrainians and prompted several thousand to flee the Zamość region.

In November 1943, the Ukrainian Auxiliary Police, with German support, launched a counter-attack. That month, it destroyed a 42-man Home Army unit that had launched an unsuccessful attack on a UPA post in Lubliniec. On 19 December, in retaliation for the liquidation of four agents, the UPA burned down half the village of Potok Górny. On 6 January 1944, policemen surrounded a group of several soldiers of the Peasant Battalions in the Bolesławiec colony, killing three of them. In February 1943, Ukrainian policemen killed several dozen people of Polish nationality in the Tomaszów and Hrubieszów counties, including a dozen or so in the village of Skomorochy. On 12 February, the police set a successful ambush on Zygmunt Bondarewicz, commander of the AK Sahryń-Turkowice company. On 18 March, Home Army officer Antoni Pelc died in similar circumstances in Wronowice. The Ukrainians also tried to organize their own self-defense.

The course of events in the region of Hrubieszów was more severe, where, on the initiative of the commander of the Home Army's local district, Antoni Rychel, the Poles acted simultaneously against the Ukrainian intelligentsia and those Ukrainians who sided with the Soviets after the USSR's attack on Poland. The latter were denounced to the Hrubieszów Gestapo. Against the first group, the tactic of attacks on pre-designated individuals was used. By June 1943 alone, 150 people had been eliminated in this way. Polish units (a unit of the Peasant Battalions, Stanisław Basaj and units of the Home Army) also attacked Ukrainian policemen.

In May 1943, units of the Hrubieszów Home Army District attacked Ukrainian villages. On 26 May, 5 people were killed in Uchanie and 23 farms were burnt down. Three days later, 4 or 5 villagers were killed in Żulice; on 30 May in Nabroż, 15 or16 Ukrainians, including Orthodox priest Sergiy Zakharchuk and 7 women were killed. In Steniatyn, 15 Ukrainian co-operative activists were executed by a Polish unit. In retaliation, an unspecified Ukrainian unit killed three Poles, including the Roman Catholic parish priest, in Nabróż. The villages of Tuchanie and Strzelce were also destroyed.

According to Grzegorz Motyka, despite the fighting, the Ukrainian underground and the Home Army made unsuccessful attempts to discuss a joint fight with the Germans. The failure of the talks was determined by an increased influx of refugees to the Lublin region, survivors of the Volhynian massacres, bringing news of the UPA's crimes in the area. The anti-Ukrainian attitude of the Polish population in the region then became even stronger. A wave of liquidations of elected representatives of the Ukrainian intelligentsia began anew. Orthodox believers, including Poles, were also attacked. The effect of the activity of the Polish partisans was an increase in the sympathy of Ukrainian inhabitants of the Lublin, Zamość and Chełm regions for the OUN. In addition, the Germans agreed to the formation of Ukrainian self-defences, which in time were incorporated into the Ukrainian National Self-Defence (UNS). Bożyk estimates their numbers at around 300 at the end of 1943. An expression of the growing influence of the Ukrainian nationalists was the scattering of leaflets in several villages, including Zosin and Strzyżów, calling on Poles to leave, and soon afterwards the murder of several dozen Poles, national and military activists. At the same time, the influx of refugees from Volhynia and the news they brought of the UPA's crimes prompted the Home Army to organise an anti-Ukrainian campaign to prevent a repetition of these events in the Chełm and Lublin regions.

On several occasions, Ukrainian units committed mass atrocities against Poles. On 1 October 1943, an unknown number of them were killed in the village of Dąbrowa, and on 3 October, 18 people were killed in Malice. During the same period, Ukrainians destroyed the Polish Home Army in Honiatyn and killed at least 23 Polish civilians. They also attacked Telatyn, Dolhobyczów and Chorobrów, probably also killing Poles in them. In response, on 1 October, a Polish unit attacked the Ukrainian village of Pasieki, killing 11 Ukrainian civilians. On 23 October, 23 Ukrainians were killed in similar circumstances in Mircze, and 182 farms were burnt down.

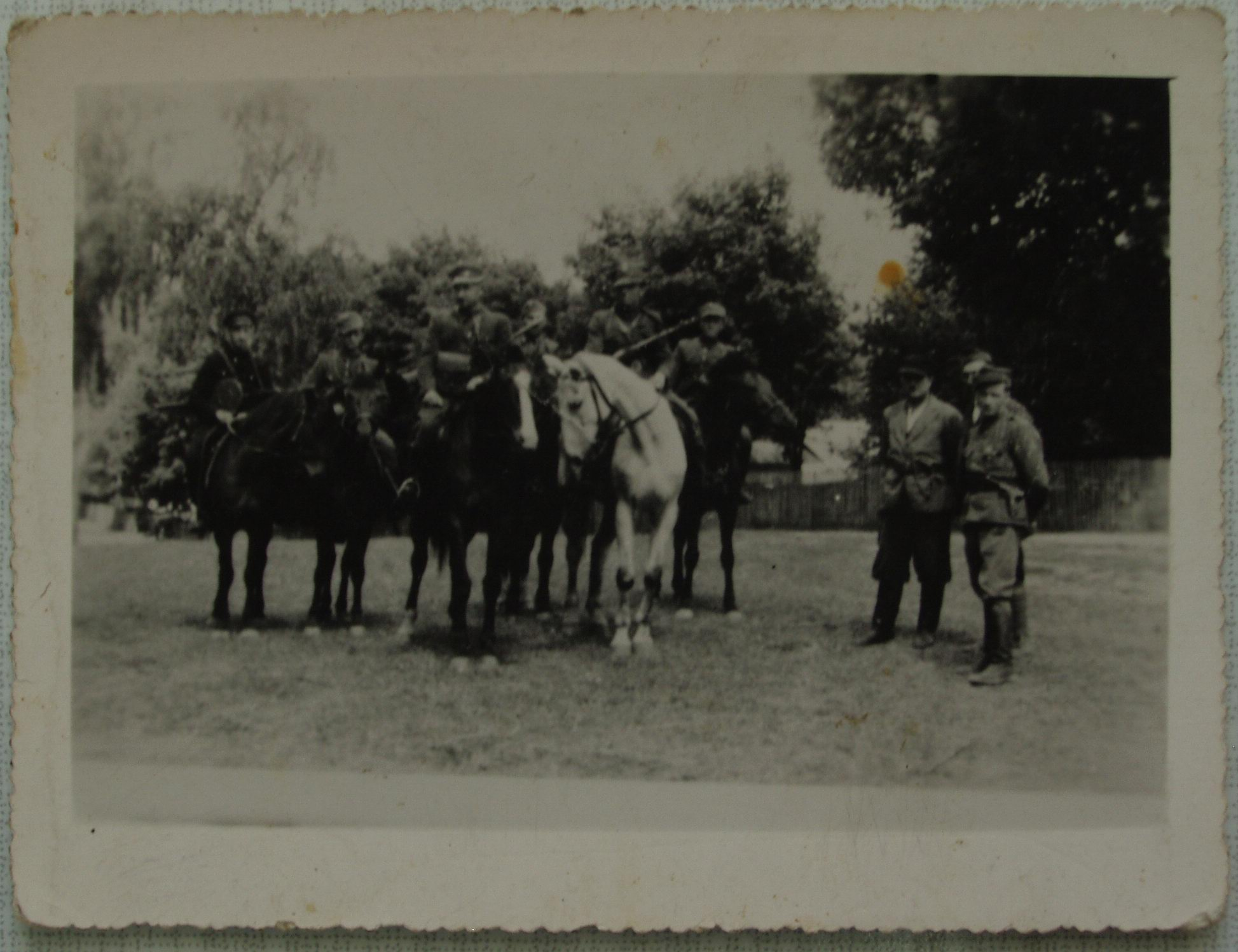
Basaj's unit

On 27 October, Józef Śmiech's Home Army unit carried out an order received earlier from the district command to carry out attacks on posts of the Ukrainian Auxiliary Police. In the village of Mołodiatycze it captured such an outpost, killing 32 Ukrainians—police officers and civilians. On the same day or two days later, the same unit attacked Grabowiec, where it destroyed a police post, freeing 15 Polish detainees held there and completely liquidating the staff of the post. There are testimonies according to which the attack on Grabowiec was combined with the murder of an unspecified number of civilian Ukrainians; one of the victims was the Orthodox priest Pavel Shvayko and his wife Joanna. Bożyk states outright that 197 Ukrainians were killed in Grabowiec. In October, Basaj's unit attacked the posts of Mieniany and Nadolce, killing four and two, respectively. In response, police officers from the Turkowice station killed the commander of the Hrubieszów district and committed atrocities in Wasylów Wielki (3 November, 13 Poles murdered) and Stara Wieś (about 30 killed on the night of 15–16 December). In Modryń, unidentified Ukrainians killed 4 Poles on 22 December. on 24 December of the same year two platoons of Basaj's unit came to the aid of the Polish population once again attacked by the UPA militia in Modryń-Kolonia. As a result of the skirmish, 14 Ukrainians and 7 Poles were killed. From the Ukrainian side, the village was attacked by a Peasant Battalion unit under the command of Basaj. At 10 p.m., near the Orthodox church and parish buildings, in the direction of the road, the village and the milk factory, a massacre began.

A total of 456 Ukrainians were killed in planned executions during 1943, 286 of whom were, in Bozyk's words, "nationally aware peasants". The remaining group included Orthodox priests, Ukrainian national activists and officers of the Ukrainian Auxiliary Police.

== Volhynia and Galicia ==
=== Volhynia ===
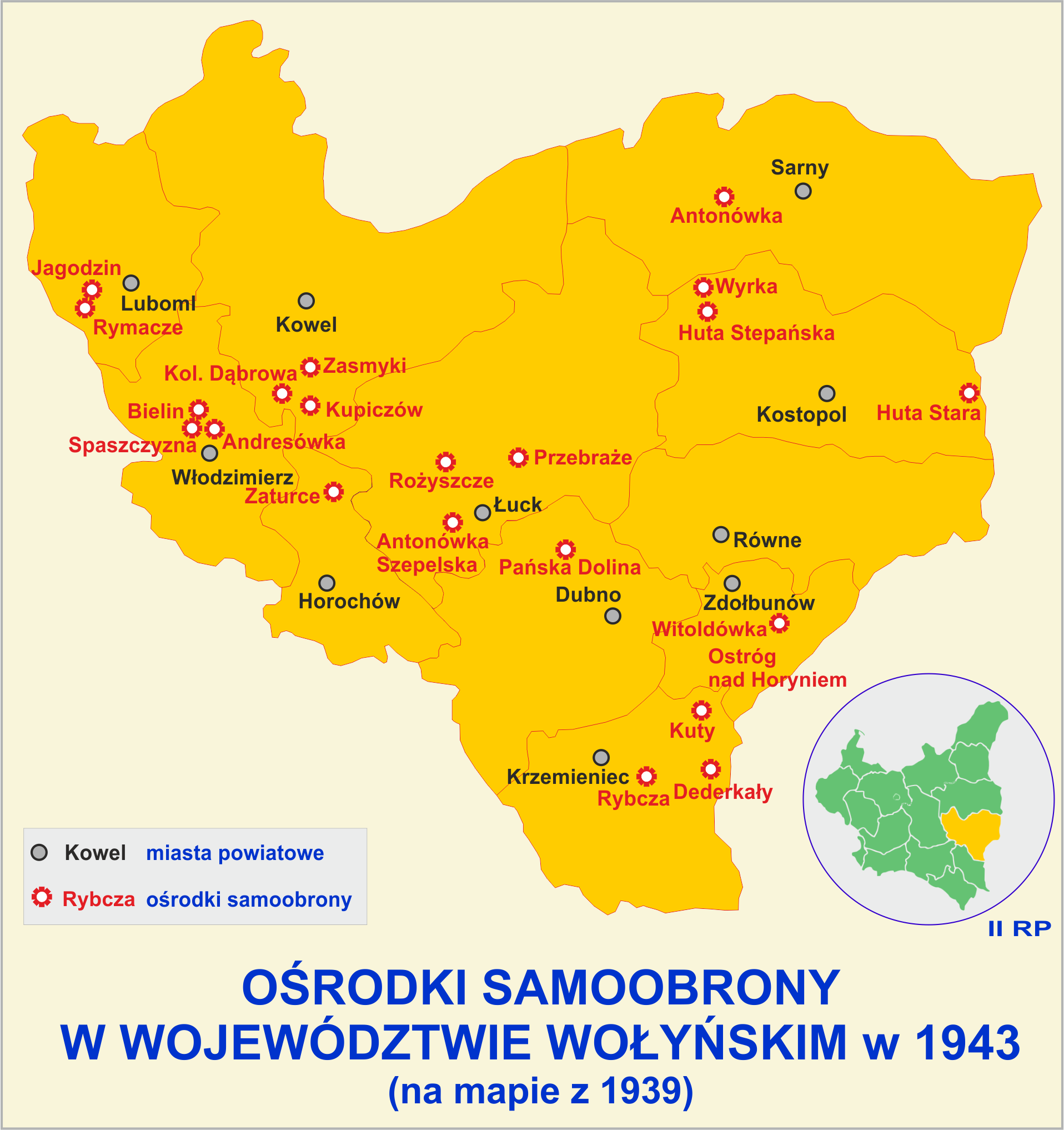
Polish self-defense centres in the Wołyń Voivodship in 1943

In early 1943 the first Home Army self-defense units were formed in Volhynia. Their commanders were primarily either Silent Unseen paratroopers, such as Władysław Kochański; or local Volhynia district commanders, such as Jan Wojciech Kiwerski and Kazimierz Bąbinski. One of the biggest fights between Home Army units and the Ukrainian Insurgent Army happened near Huta Stepańska and Wyrka. The engagement resulted in the retreat of the Home Army to Huta Stara, repelling attacks during the evacuation.

On 11 November 1943, a Home Army unit under the command of Lieutenant Władysław Czermiński, "Jastrzęb", learned that the German garrison had left Kupiczów and that the UPA unit instead occupied the village. The Poles recaptured the village after a short battle on 12 November. The next day, the UPA unsuccessfully tried to recapture the settlement. Czermiński's unit returned to Zasmyki, leaving forty soldiers in Kupiczów. There were doubts in the command about holding the position, but Major Jan Szatyński-Szatowski "Kowal" opposed the withdrawal. He concluded an agreement with the Czechs from Kupiczów, who fielded a platoon of troops and provided food for the crew in exchange for protection. On 22 November, UPA units launched a massive attack on Kupiczów. The inhabitants fought with the remnants of their strength when the troops of "Jastrzęb" and "Sokol" came to their aid, forcing the Ukrainians to withdraw.

The Polish forces also fought victorious battles against UPA units at Przebraże, Pańska Dolina, Huta Stara, Kuty, Rybcza, and Antonówka Szepelska. The Battle of Vilya on 6 September also resulted in a Polish victory.

Units of the People's Guard also participated in fights with the UPA: on December 18, 1943, a unit named after Tadeusz Kościuszko attacked the village of Lakhvichi. The local OUN and UPA militants retreated from the village due to the numerical superiority of the Poles. The settlement was half-burned with 25 civilians killed, 15 wounded, and 10 kidnapped.

On 27 January, an SB-Oun unit led by Dmytro Kupyak attacked a forestry area in the village of Grabowa, where members of the Home Army and Polish self-defense forces were stationed. Nine people were killed in the attack, six of whom were officers or non-commissioned officers, including Kazimierz Kaminski and Stanislav Sobanski. The commander of the Polish self-defense forces called these losses "irreparable".

Only at the beginning of 1944, after the Red Army had crossed the pre-war Polish border, the Home Army command ordered the mobilisation of partisan units in Volhynia and decided to launch Operation Tempest. On 28 January 1944, the 27th Volhynian Infantry Division was formed. In addition to operations against the Germans, the division carried out 16 major combat actions against UPA units, partially removing the threat to the Polish civilian population in the west of Volhynia.

=== Eastern Galicia ===
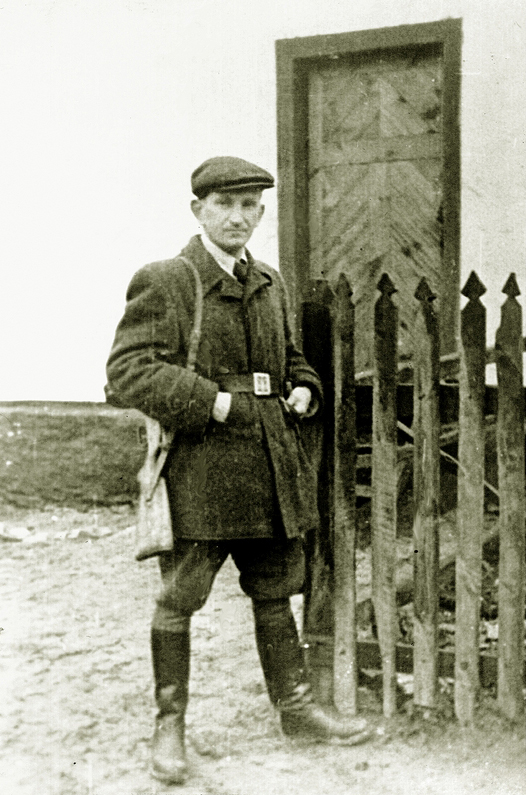
UPA commander, Roman Shukhevych, gave the order for the annihilation of Poles in Eastern Galicia

The largest battle in Galicia happened in Hanaczów on 2 February–2 May 1944, where the Polish self-defense supported by local Jews in the area fought with the UPA supported by deserters from the 14th Waffen Grenadier Division of the SS (1st Galician). The battle ended with a Polish victory, but the village was destroyed by the Germans.

On 24 March the UPA attacked the village of Maziarnia Wawrzkowa. The Poles succeeded in repelling the attack, however 28 Poles were killed, including 21 members of the self-defence unit, among them Home Army platoon commander Jan Lewicki. Ukrainian losses amounted to about 12 killed. The entire village was burned down, except for a few buildings. This was part of the greater defence of Maziarnia–Wawrykova–Hrabova–Huta Pieniacka "triangle", which resulted in the liquidation by the Germans. Self-defence units were not established in many places, especially Ukrainian-dominated ones. It was feared that it would be perceived as a provocation by the Ukrainians; moreover, one risked being denounced by the Ukrainians, usually for possessing firearms. The fate of the Polish population in such villages was the worst.

From 9–12 March the Home Army, as part of Operation Nieszpory, killed 11 Ukrainian Auxiliary Police men. Notes were attached to the bodies of those who were shot, informing them why they were killed. From that moment the Ukrainians stopped murdering Poles in Lviv.

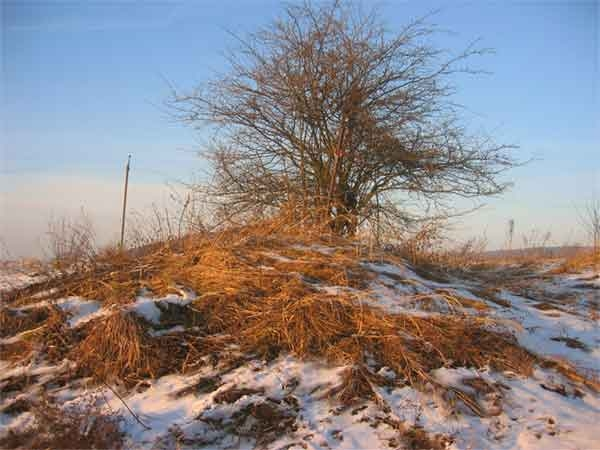
A mound in the Hanaczów cemetery, commemorating the victims of the murders committed by Ukrainian nationalists in February and April 1944

== Hrubieszów, Tomaszów and Lubaczów counties in 1944 ==
=== Escalation (January–March 1944) ===
At the beginning of 1944, fears began to grow on the Polish side that the events in Volhynia would be repeated in the Lublin region. The Ukrainians intensified the creation of local self-defence units in villages located between the Bug and a strip of villages: Uchanie, Bereść, Hostynne, Werbkowice, Wronowice, Miętkie, Telatyn, and Chodywańce. In these villages, in order to increase the effectiveness of the Ukrainian National Self-Defence units, bunkers were built and trenches dug. However, in January, there were only isolated mutual assaults, with several casualties on both sides.

The conflict escalated again the following month. Ukrainian partisan units and police officers carried out attacks on Poles, with several people falling victim to each (villages of Medycze, Terebiniec, Pielaki, and Turka).

The course of events in Małków on 3, 8 or 13 February is unclear. According to Polish studies, the "Ryś" unit prevented a unit of the 14th SS Grenadier Division from pacifying this village; according to Ukrainian studies, it committed a crime against 14 civilian Ukrainians. Grzegorz Motyka claims that both theses may be true.

On 9 February, in an ambush near Białowody, Polish partisans eliminated five Ukrainian policemen from the police station in Grabowiec. During the action, one of the Poles was killed. On 11 February, the Peasant Battalions organized an ambush on Ukrainian policemen near Wereszyn, killing four of them. In an unknown Polish action that day, the leader of the UNS unit "Ocheret" died.

On 22 February, a group of Poles killed six Ukrainians in Cichobórz and robbed two more. In response, the Ukrainians killed eight Poles two days later, whom they suspected of having committed the earlier crime. However, Polish attacks on detachments of the Ukrainian Auxiliary Police continued. On 28 February, Home Army units, after a fierce battle with Ukrainian self-defence, burnt down the villages of Liski and Kościaszyn. The losses of both sides are unknown.

On 27 February, there was another Ukrainian attack on Łasków and Górki, fighting against the Home Army and Peasant Battalions; two Ukrainians were killed.

In view of the development of the situation, the Zamość Inspectorate of the Home Army decided to evacuate the Polish civilian population to the districts of Bilgoraj, Zamojski, Chelm, Krasnostawski, and the western part of Tomaszowski, to strengthen Polish self-defence in the remaining area and to launch a coordinated attack on the area occupied by the Ukrainians. At the beginning of March, the evacuation plan was launched, but was only partially carried out due to the reluctant attitude of the Polish population. The decision to carry out a mass action against Ukrainian villages in the Hrubieszów district was not unanimous. Opponents of the action feared its political consequences and a further aggravation of Polish-Ukrainian relations in the area. As the forces in the Hrubieszów district were too weak to carry out the operation, the commanders of the Tomaszów and Zamość districts were obliged to provide assistance to the Hrubieszów district troops. In the first days of March, a detailed plan of action was discussed in Steniatin. In the first place the Polish units were to attack Mieniany, Kryłów, Mircze, Dołhobyczów, Chorobrów, Krystynopol, Sahryń, Waręż, and Bełz.

=== Hrubieszów Revolution ===
In the evening of 7 March 1944, in the forest of Lipowiec near Tyszowiec, a concentration of the Tomaszów Home Army troops took place, consisting of about 1200 soldiers, under the command of Lieutenant Zenon Jachymek "Wiktor". A second unit of about 800 soldiers was commanded by Lieutenant Eugeniusz Sioma "Lech". The next day there was an attack by the 5th SS Police Regiment, supported by local Ukrainian self-defence members, on the village of Prehoryłe. The attackers were repulsed by the "Ryś" unit, which then set fire to the farms of Ukrainians living in the village. The number of victims is not established, but most likely more were killed on the Polish side. The Home Army anticipated another Ukrainian attack on 16 March. A pre-emptive attack on 9–10 March was planned by Hrubieszów District commander Marian Gołębiewski, despite the opposition of the Peasant Battalions. The Home Army planned to capture Sahryń, Uhrynow, Szychowice and Łasków on the aforementioned days.

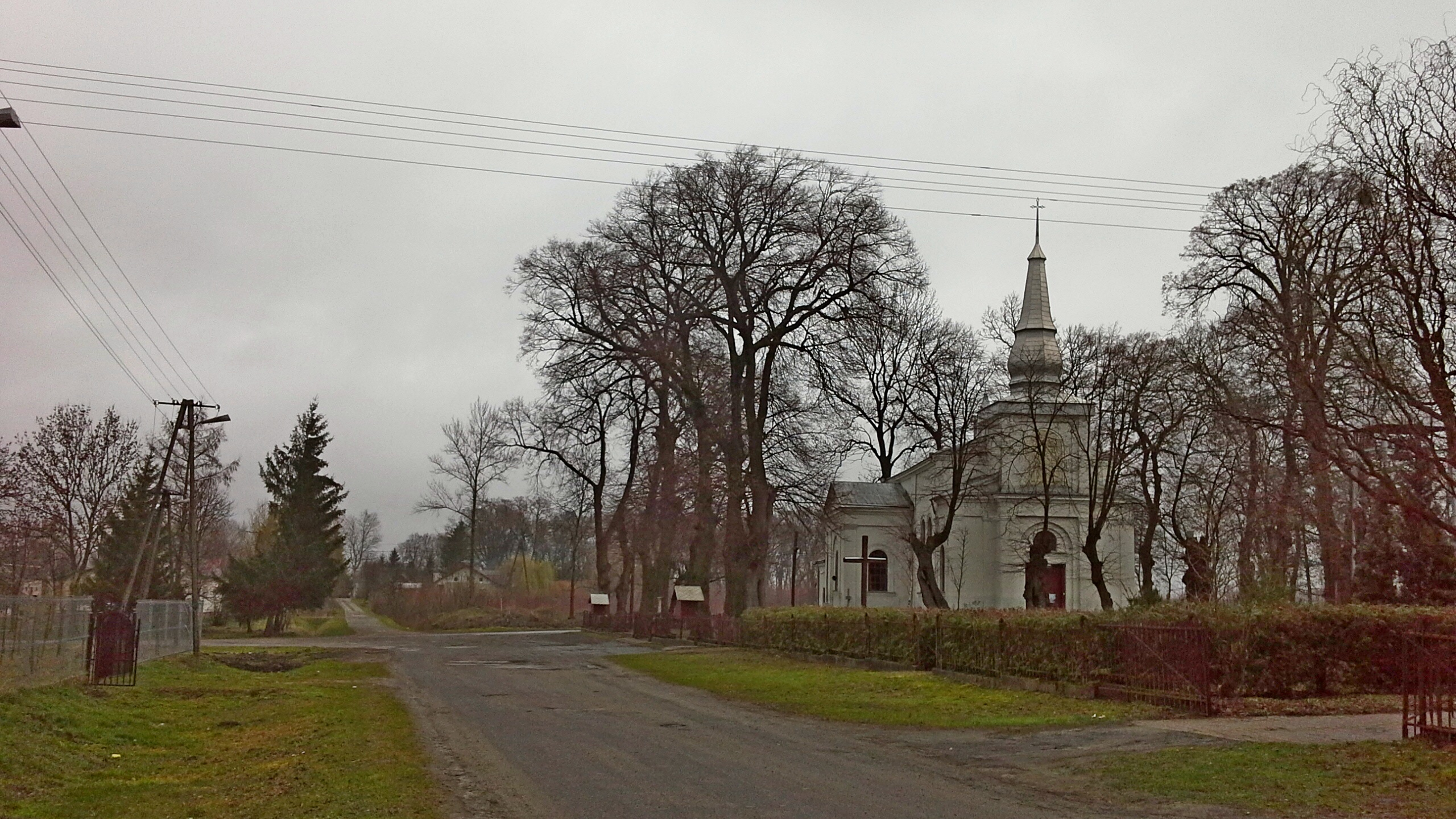
Sahryń was attacked by Polish partisans on 10 March 1944. The church visible on the right, then an Orthodox church, was burned down that day.

At dawn on 10 March, Polish troops under the command of "Wiktor" attacked Sahryń. The village was completely destroyed, including the burning of the Orthodox church. Several hundred civilian inhabitants were killed in Sahryń.

On the same day, units of the Home Army and the Peasant Battalions also attacked Szychowice, breaking through the Ukrainian self-defence. In the village they took over plans for an attack on the Polish positions, which was to take place at 2 a.m. on 16 March, presumably kept by the UNS commander for the Hrubieszów district, Danyla Mekełyta. At least 137 Ukrainian civilians were massacred in Szychowice and the village was burned down. The same unit then moved towards Łasków. According to a Polish account of the events, the village was captured and a weapons cache was found in its bunkers. The Ukrainian report contains information about the perpetration of crimes on dozens of, or even several hundred, civilians. Among those killed in Łasków was the Orthodox priest Lev Korobczuk, canonised in 2003 as one of the Chełm and Podlasie martyrs.

Further operations towards Werbkowice were unsuccessful. The Poles captured and burned the colonies of Alojzów, Brzeziny, Bereźnia, Dęby, Sahryń-Kolonia and the villages of Malice, Metelin, Strzyżowiec, Turkowice, Wronowice, Mircze, Prehoryłe, Terebiń, Terebiniec and Wereszyn. However, the assault on Werbkowice occupied by German units was repulsed. The "Lech" formation was also forced to retreat. It failed in its assault on Uhrynów, where it also encountered German units. In Miętek the commander of the unit, Sioma, was wounded. After two days of fighting, the Polish units withdrew near Komarów and then returned to their places of stationing. In the process, the Poles burned the villages of Mołożów, Stara Wieś and Miętkie. In total, the Home Army operation carried out on 10 March ended with the burning of 20 Ukrainian villages and the murder of 1,500 of their inhabitants, with almost no losses of their own.

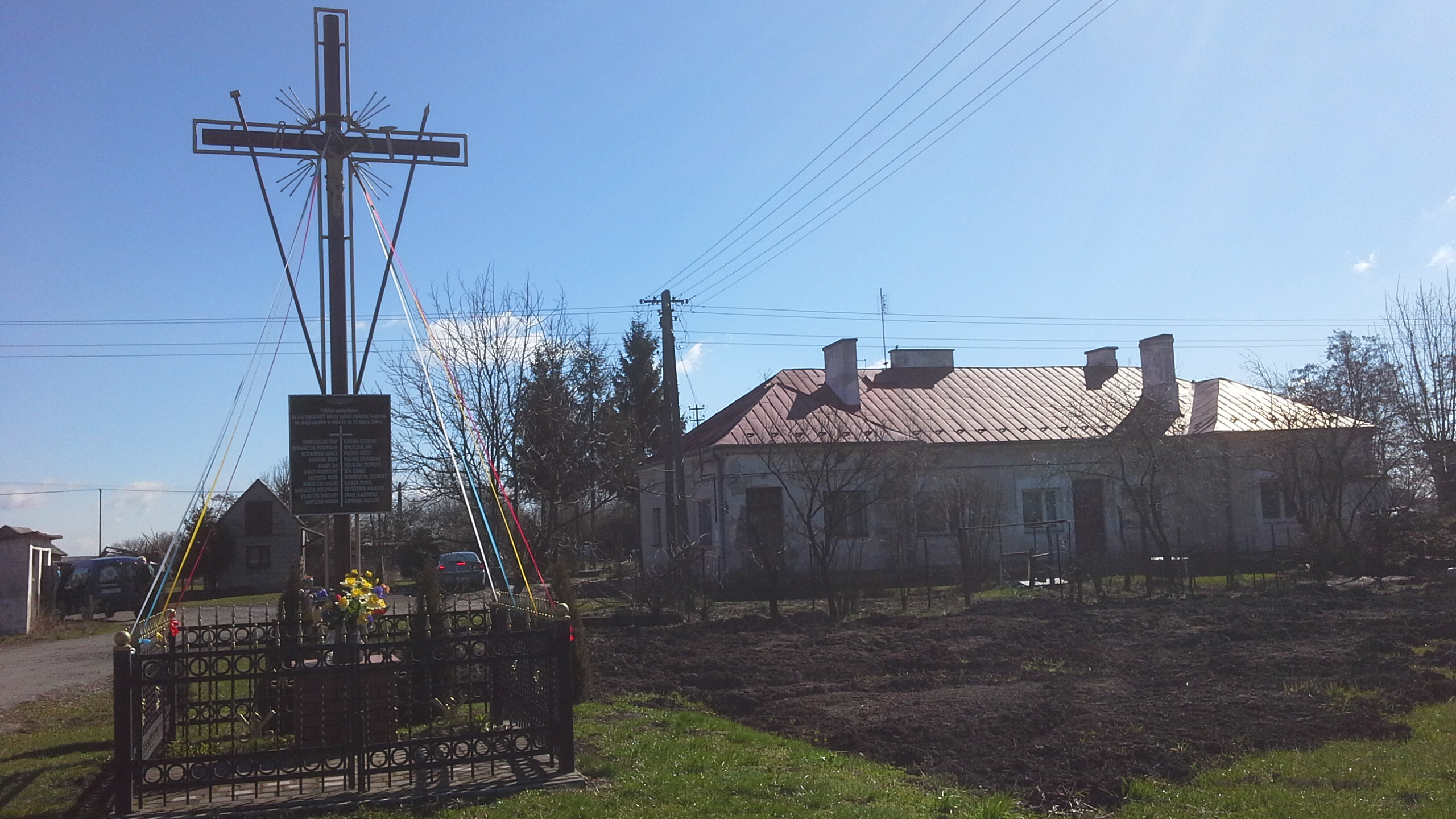
The former railway station in Gozdów and a cross commemorating the Polish railway workers murdered there

There were immediately a series of retaliatory attacks. On 9 March, unknown perpetrators—possibly Ukrainian policemen—shot three Poles in Grabowiec. Over the next three days, Poles were murdered in the Kosmów and Romanów colonies and in the villages of Masłomęcz, Rzeplin, Zaborce and Korczów, as well as on the road from Hrubieszów to Grabowiec. On 15 March, a UNS unit murdered 33 people at the narrow-gauge railway station in Gozdów. On 17 March in Oszczów, 23 Polish villagers and a group of Ukrainians living there were killed as a result of Polish-Ukrainian fighting, and the village buildings were completely destroyed.

A major counter-offensive by the UPA began on 16 March, when the "Halajda" regiment entered the Zamość region from the south. It was located in the then communes of Tarnoszyn, Telatyn and Poturzyn. Kureń broke the resistance of the Home Army units (especially in Tarnoszyn), capturing Tarnoszyn, Dyniska, Ulhówek and Żabcze. In all localities there were crimes against Polish civilians; UPA soldiers killed 84, 17, 14 and 30 people, respectively. The UPA also killed nine people in Korczmin. On 16–17 March, the "Ryś" unit fought a pacification group consisting of gendarmes, SS men and Ukrainian police from the UPA group "Jahody" (approx. 600 people strong), which attacked Łasków, Zabłocie and Małków. The unit was helped by the Home Army units of M. Olszak "Hardy" and A. Aleksandrov "Brawura". The Ukrainians were defeated; 30 SS and UPA men were killed in the fight, 2 cars were burned and the villages were saved.

On 19 March, units of the 14th SS Grenadier Division, Ortschutz, Ukrainian police, partly Schupo and gendarmes (approximately 800 strong) began a large-scale operation against Basaj's battalion and the Home Army battalion under the command of Zenon Jachymek "Wiktor". when they surrounded one of Basaj's platoons in the village of Łasków, the main forces of the Basaj battalion and the "Wiktor" battalion rushed to help the surrounded people; "Ryś" drove out the enemy and captured the Mircze-Kryłów road; at the same time, the companies of "Czaruś" and "Wiktor" from the Home Army pushed the enemy away from the Sokal-Hrubieszów road and occupied Mircze. After achieving these goals, Polish partisans captured the last Ukrainian resistance points in the towns of Modryń, Modryniec and Masłomęcz; in the third phase of operations, Ukrainian self-defense bases in the villages of Mieniany, Kozodawy, Cichobórz and Kosmów were attacked, completely displacing their crews; significant losses were inflicted on the Ukrainians. On 20 March a UNS unit attacked Poturzyn, killing 72 Poles and fending off a defending Hrubieszów company of the Home Army. Lieutenant Zenon Jachymek's unit arrived with relief too late and only managed to shoot those Ukrainians it found in the ruins of the village, engaged in looting. Wiktor's unit split into two groups of 150 men, which set off to Wasylów Mały and Radostów. The first village, where there was no self-defence, was taken by the Home Army without any fight. An unspecified number of Ukrainians with whom weapons were found were shot. However, as in Sahryń, "Wiktor" ordered that civilians be spared.

The second group of the Home Army encountered resistance from Ukrainian self-defense in Kościaszyn, Suszów and Liski. According to some accounts, the capture of these villages was combined with the murder of 130 civilian Ukrainians. In addition, the Poles found 18 Polish families who had been hiding in shelters for a long time. On the other hand, atrocities against the Polish population took place in Frankamionka, which was attacked by a unit coming from Volhynia. Several dozen victims were killed; the remaining inhabitants of the village were saved by the arrival of the Home Army "Wiklina" company. On 25–27 March, UNS units destroyed Wasylów, Szczepiatyn and Hubinek, killing 102, 16 and 6 Poles. In response, the 8th company of the Telatyn Home Army under the command of "Szarfa" attacked Rzeplin, combining the elimination of Ukrainians considered particularly dangerous with the evacuation of Polish villagers. However, the surprise attack failed and a clash between the Home Army unit and the UNS took place on the spot. On 28 March, the "Halajda" battalion attacked the village of Ostrów, where the attack was repulsed by Poles who took refuge in a brick church. However, there were between a dozen and as many as 300 casualties.

The numerical superiority of the Ukrainian forces made the Home Army decide to withdraw behind the Bug. However, Jerzy Markiewicz argued that Ukrainian attacks alone would not have been able to force the Poles to make such a decision; the decision was determined by parallel attacks by the Ukrainian Insurgent Army and the UNS, as well as German anti-Partisan actions.

The UPA's counter-offensive forced the Polish population to flee to areas controlled by the Home Army and Peasant Battalions. At the end of March 1944, the Polish population was almost completely evacuated from the areas of the Hrubieszów district, located south of the Hrubieszów - Zamość road, with the exception of part of the municipality of Dołhobyczów. The Polish-Ukrainian fighting in March led to the destruction of many towns, with both Polish and Ukrainian populations suffering as a result. Moreover, the ethnic conflict widened and intensified, which was bound to lead to further fighting of a military nature.

On 1 April, Polish troops and the remnants of the Polish population were finally driven out of Dolhobyczów. Soon, the evacuation of the Polish population from Telatin deep into the Tomaszów and Bilgoraj districts began. During the evacuation of the Polish population, a massacre took place in Poturzyn - in the early hours of the morning a unit of the 14th SS Grenadier Division, supported by a subunit of the Ukrainian Insurgent Army (UPA), invaded the village, where a large group of refugees were located; 162 civilians were killed.

The Poles found themselves on the defensive, fighting defensive battles. The whole operation was commanded by the commander of the Tomaszów district, Major Wilhelm Szczepankiewicz "Drugak", who was stationed with his staff in Kolonia Steniatyn. Breaking through the Polish defence between Żerniki and Podlodów would open the way for the Ukrainian Insurgent Army to penetrate the whole area of the Tomaszów district. Moreover, the Ukrainian forces were well organised under the command of the so-called "Chelm Front of the UPA" and armed.

Between 2 and 9 April, Ukrainian Insurgent Army units, supported by SS-Galizien and Ordnungspolizei units, struck the eastern section of the Polish defence lines. The aim of the Ukrainian units was to capture the area of the municipalities of Jarczów, Tarnoszyn, Telatyn and partly Łaszczów and Tyszowce and to push the Home Army units behind the Huczwa River. The battle, fought on 5 April, ended with the success of the Polish troops, who maintained the occupied defence lines. The partisans lost only the village of Żerniki. In the course of the fighting, UNS units committed crimes against Polish civilians several times. 18 Poles were killed in Jarczów, Radków and Szlatyn, while 105 people of both nationalities fell at the hands of the UNS in Łubcze.

On 9 April 1944, on the first day of Easter, a new great battle took place along the entire length of the Polish defence line - from Telatyn to Jarczów. It was one of the fiercest and bloodiest battles fought during the occupation by AK and BCH units against UPA units in the Zamojszczyzna area. The main attack of the UPA units was directed at the Telatyn-Steniatyn-Posady-Rokitno section. The attack of the Ukrainians in this section was carried out with about 2,000 men, supported by heavy fire of mortars, grenade launchers and heavy machine guns. Particularly fierce battles were fought over the Posadov colony, which was changing hands, near Steniatyn and the village of Zulice, which was defended by Polish units. Those wounded in the battles near Steniatyne, Posadowne and Żulice were sent to field hospitals in Pukarzów and Wólka Pukarzowska. The Polish troops, despite heavy losses and the loss of the Telatyna area, held their main positions and did not allow themselves to be pushed out of the area. The "Jahoda" sotnia pushed the Poles out of the Posadow and Rachaj forests, captured Telatyn, while the storming of Rokitno and Dutrow failed. About a thousand Poles and 2,000 Ukrainians took part in the clash. Grzegorz Motyka considers the entire battle inconclusive. Although the Ukrainian advance was eventually stopped, a breach was created in the AK defensive lines, which forced the Poles to retreat behind the Huczwa River. There was also a significant increase in the number of desertions in the Polish ranks. In view of the unfavourable situation of the Polish units, the commander of the Tomaszów district of the AK suggested mobilising all the forces of the inspectorate for a new operation against the Ukrainian Insurgent Army and the UNS. Despite the initial approval of this concept, the attack was eventually called off. However, the larger Ukrainian strikes also temporarily ceased, which Myroslav Onyszkiewicz explained by German counter-partisan actions that hit the UPA. There were only sporadic attacks on individual villages. The first major attack by the Ukrainian Insurgent Army took place on 14 May, when Ukrainian troops, coming from the direction of Werbkowice, attacked and burned Honiatycze. On 15–17 May, fierce fighting continued in the area of Nabrozh, Telatyn and Zulice. Telatyn changed hands several times. Fearing encirclement, the Polish troops had to withdraw across the Huczwa River from Nabróża.

On 30 April, at a meeting of leaders of the Ukrainian community of Chelmshchyna and Lublin (including the Orthodox Metropolitan Ilarion (Ohijenko)), the Chelm Council was established to consolidate the Ukrainian face of Chelmshchyna. This influenced the UPA to take further military action against the Poles. This is because success in combat was considered the best guarantee of the council's political objectives.

On the night of 4–5 May 1944, Ukrainian Insurgent Army units made an unsuccessful attempt to capture the village of Nabróż, the easternmost Polish resistance point beyond the Huczwa River. The village was partially destroyed, but there were no casualties among the Polish population, most of whom had left Nabrozh in mid-April in fear of the Ukrainian Insurgent Army's attacks. Only a few inhabitants remained, protected by self-defence and AK units.

Two days later, on 7 May, an UPA unit, at the request of Ukrainian peasants, undertook an operation to clear the colonies of Marysin, Borsuk and Andrzejówka, which had been a base for the Polish militia. Poles from these villages had previously killed several Ukrainians. The Ukrainian Insurgent Army (UPA) met strong resistance in Kolonia Borsuk, where, after a short battle, the Polish outpost retreated towards Tyszowce. During the clash, 127 abandoned farms were burnt down. Ukrainian partisans killed six Polish soldiers and captured a number of weapons. On 12 May, an UPA unit clashed with Polish forces near Kolonia Malice and the villages of Koniuchy and Malice, burning these villages and killing ten Poles.

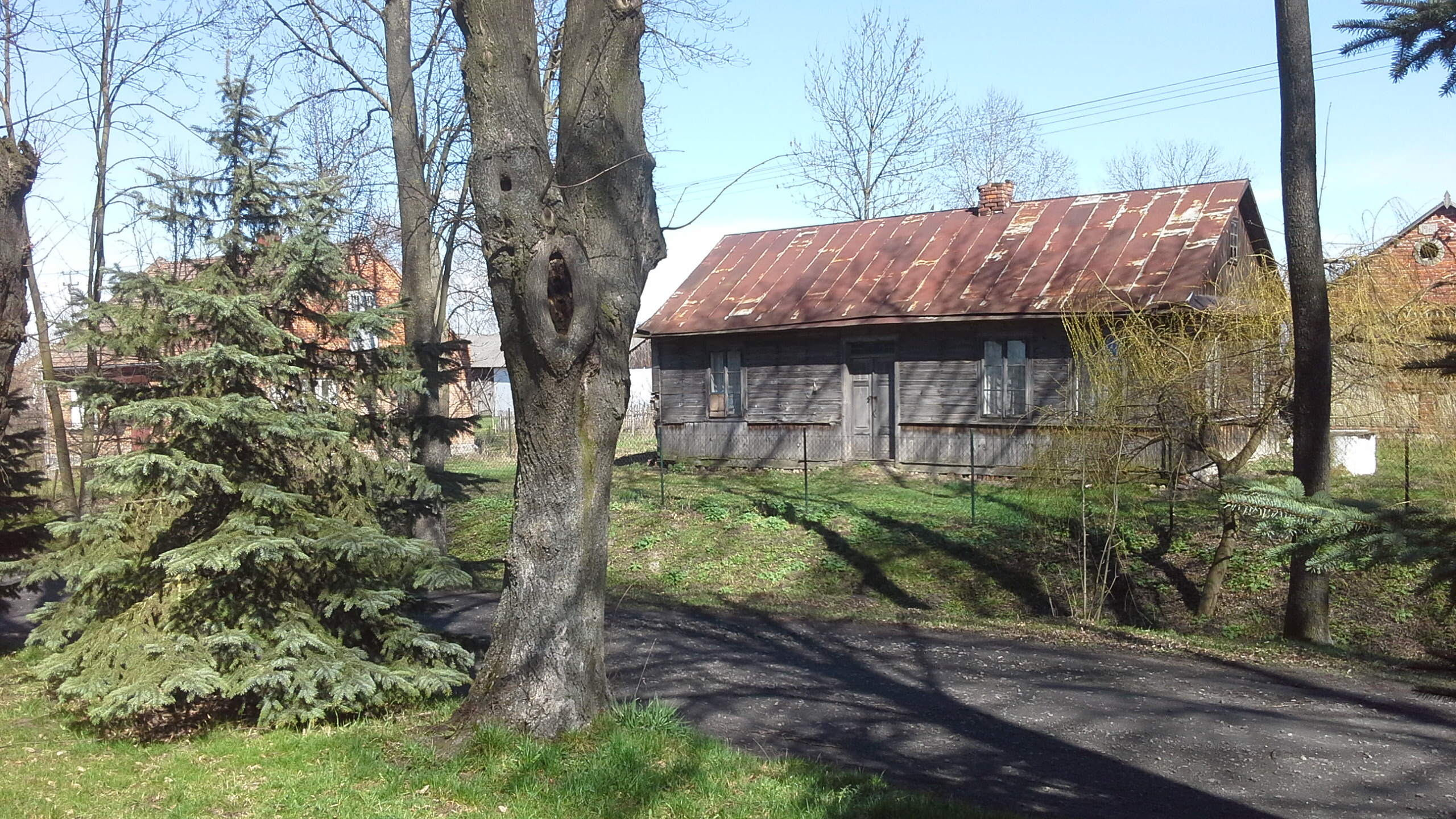
Honiatycze

In mid-May, the Ukrainian side again started major offensive operations. On May 14, they suddenly attacked from Werbkowice, burning the colonies of Honiatyce and Oczeret, fortunately, the population of these towns had already been evacuated. The next day, the Ukrainians attacked Honiatycze and the Wakiya colony, defended by Wiklina's company. Several Home Army units and a group of Soviet partisans, senior lieutenant, came to the aid of "Wiklina" Rudanowski. Together, the attackers were driven beyond the Huczwa River. The Poles had four dead and eleven wounded. On the Ukrainian side. According to Polish sources, approximately 50 people died

On May 15, a UPA unit also attacked Żulice in the south- eastern defense sector. The "Iron Company" came to the aid of the local Home Army outpost. With a sudden flank attack, the "Iron Company" not only stopped the Ukrainian attack, but even captured Telatyn, which, however, surrendered without a fight after a few hours.

On 17 May, in the village of Buśno in the municipality of Białopole, a Ukrainian was killed and 12 households were burnt down. The attackers were repulsed by local self- On the same day, Poles burned down the village of Zaborce in the municipality of Molodiatycze. Six Ukrainians were killed and three were wounded. The attackers managed to take 10 horses and a few cows; most of the cattle were burned. According to a Ukrainian OUN document: "In the vicinity of the two villages mentioned, it is apparent that the Poles were preparing for a new attack. On the farms of Uchanie municipality, Poles are digging fortifications". Attacks on Ukrainians also occurred in the Chelm and Krasnostaw provinces. On 3 May, in the village of Sielec in the municipality of Rakolupy, Chełm County, Polish militia killed a Ukrainian village leader. Two days later, on 5 May, in a forest near Wierzchowin in the commune of Siennica Różana, Krasnystawski poviat, "a young Ukrainian, an inhabitant of this village, was bestially murdered. On the same day near Wierzchowiny Poles robbed several more peasant By May 22, according to the Chełm OUN, another four people of Ukrainian nationality from Wierzchowiny were killed without a trace. On May 23, a Polish soldiers numbering about 50 people robbed the Ukrainian population of the village of Syczyn in the Olchowiec commune of the Chełm district. As it was written in the situational report of the Lublin Home Army District command of June 1944, "attacks on the Ukrainian population [in the Chełm AKM.Z. district] cause fires and deterioration of relations between the Polish and Ukrainian populations"13, despite mutual hostility, as Grzegorz Motyka rightly notes, in this eastern part In the Lublin region, the Polish-Ukrainian conflict did not escalate to the same extent as in the Hrubieszów district.

On the night of 18–19 May, the "Yurchenko" couton struck Nabroż. As they moved to their starting positions, according to the Ukrainian report, UPA units burnt down the villages of Kryshyn, Tuczapy, Mołożów, Lipowiec and Kolonia Marysin, i.e. villages with Polish outposts blocking the road to Nabróża. They were pushed back by the overwhelming Ukrainian forces or withdrew in advance without a fight behind the Huczwa River. After a fierce battle of several hours, which took place in the centre of Nabruże (around the church and cemetery wall where the defenders' positions were located) and on the outskirts of the village, the Poles also lost this point of resistance located on the eastern side of the Huczwa River. Some of the AK soldiers broke through in the direction of Tyszowce, while others made their way towards Stara Wieś, where they encountered Ukrainian reinforcements - the "Hamalija" unit. The Ukrainians, not expecting Poles from this direction, were initially surprised by them and pushed out. The situation in this section was only brought under control by the arrival of part of the "Jahoda" sotnia with relief. Also taking part in the fighting in the Nabruza area was the "Ostrizhsky" sotnia, which, as we read in the Ukrainian document, contributed significantly to the successful conduct of the entire operation.

It is known from Ukrainian and Polish sources that at the sound of the battle, German gendarmerie left Tyszowce, which, due to the UPA's counterattack, was forced to retreat. A little later, a German aeroplane still flew over the battlefield and fired on the UPA units, but without causing them any damage. In total, in the battle for Nabróż, the Ukrainian side estimated the enemy's losses at 46 killed and several taken prisoner. The Ukrainian Insurgent Army's losses amounted to two dead and eight wounded. In addition, the following were captured: a cekaem, more than 10 rifles, several horses and cows. According to divergent data from the Polish side, 12-15 soldiers of the Home Army were killed in the defence of Nabróże. UPA partisans also killed from a few to about 30 Polish civilians, who were staying in the village or its vicinity. On the other hand, German sources estimated the amount of Polish losses, mainly of the local population, at about 100 people. The Ukrainian attack on 18–19 May led to the collapse of Polish defences in the eastern part of the Tomaszów and Hrubieszów districts of the Home Army, followed by the withdrawal of troops behind the Huczwa River for fear of encirclement. Before the great battle, the Narol area was regularly harassed by Ukrainian partisans who pasted up leaflets threatening the inhabitants of the settlements that they would be killed if they did not move out of the area. Such actions, however, had no effect, but as a result of them, contributed to the antagonism of the population of these regions, and finally, after many weeks of harassment, 21 may, a large UPA force of about 500 to 1000 attacked Narol, the base of the defenders contributed to the collapse of the UPA attack and the subsequent counter-attack, which caused the Ukrainians to rush and flee, 30 to 80 Ukrainians died in the battle, and many were wounded, Polish losses included 13 killed and 25 wounded. The Poles won a great victory at Narol which contributed to driving the Ukrainian Insurgent Army's forces out of the region and breaking them up.

Of the 1,283 identified Ukrainian victims of the Hrubieszów Revolution, approximately 40% were women and 18% were children.

=== Polish offensive on Ulhówek and Rzeczyca ===
On 1 June 1944, Polish units began preparing for an attack on the approximately fifty-kilometre-long Tyszowce - Łaszczów - Jarczów section. Its aim was to pre-empt the actions of the UPA units. The main strike was to be directed at Ulhówek and Rzeczyca, which were key points in the UPA's positions. Nine groupings were formed on the aforementioned section of the Polish starting lines. The headquarters of the eastern section and the command post of the Polish units were located in the Bukowiec forest behind the village of Grodysławice. Before an attack from the rear, roads were mined, including the Tomaszów - Łaszczów road between Łaszczów - Wólka Pukarzowska - Grodysławice. Four field hospitals were also prepared and deployed in the Bukowiec forest, at the home of Home Army members Kacper Siek and Roj in the village of Pawłówka, in the Muratyn colony, as well as in Józef Paskiewicz's farm. On the eve of the battle, the units of the first grouping left the Tyszowiecki forest and advanced through Turkowice towards the village of Dąbrowa, which, however, could not be conquered as it was occupied by a strong Wehrmacht detachment.

On 2 June 1944 at 2 a.m. the remaining Polish groupings went on the offensive. The largest battle in the Zamojszczyzna region with the troops of the Ukrainian Insurgent Army began. The main battle was fought in the area of the villages of Ulhówek and Rzeczyca. The UPA troops outnumbered them, were better armed than the units of the BCH and AK, and, moreover, fought from strongly fortified defensive positions. In the battle of Rzeczyca and Ulhówek, the Polish units suffered heavy losses. Also the offensive actions of the Poles in other areas did not bring the expected success.

It should be added that the Germans did not remain passive during the Polish-Ukrainian fighting. The German air force joined the action. As early as 8:00 a.m., six planes bombed and shelled Polish units with their on-board guns along the entire line of the ongoing fighting. The attacks of the planes were repeated several times and lasted until 1 p.m. Moreover, the German aviation bombed field hospitals in the Bukowiec forest, in Pawłówka, Kolonia Muratyn and the Paszkiewicz manor.

The day-long bloody battle ended around 4 p.m. During the battle, the villages of Posadów, Szlatyn, Łubcze, Żerniki, Rzeczyca, Podlodów and, in part, Ulhówek, and the village of Zimno were burnt down.

In the evening hours all the groupings began their retreat, withdrawing to the line of the Huczwa River. The Polish groupings failed to break through the UPA's defensive lines. In the fighting on 2 June, 71 Home Army soldiers were killed, around 100 partisans were wounded.

=== Ukrainian counteroffensive ===
A counterattack by Ukrainian Insurgent Army units took place on 14 June 1944. It was then that Ukrainian units attacked a part of Łaszczów called Podhajce. Polish units stationed in Kolonia Nadolce in the strength of about 120 men rushed to the aid of the burning village. Soon, in the greatest haste, units and groups of soldiers from neighbouring villages, including Pukarzów, Wólka Pukarzowska, Muratyń and Czartowiec, began to arrive and joined the fight spontaneously. Towards the end of the battle, the "Żelazna" company also arrived. the attack was repulsed, but Podhajce was burned.

Polish-Ukrainian battles conducted in wartime conditions, with mutual cruelty, led to the destruction of dozens of villages, many soldiers of the Home Army and the Ukrainian Insurgent Army were killed, and there were also considerable casualties among the civilian population. Grzegorz Motyka estimates the number of dead (combatants and civilians) at 3-4 thousand on each side. He also states that tens of thousands more people of both nationalities were forced to leave their villages. According to Bożyk, 4,000 victims were reported on the Ukrainian side, of whom 1,400 are known by their name.

Fighting continued until July 1944, interrupted only by the arrival of the front and the entry of Red Army units of the 1st Ukrainian Front.

== Antagonism between the Poles and Ukrainians in 1945 ==
=== Behind the Buh River ===
In the area of the Przemyśl and Dobromil counties, clashes started at the beginning of 1945, when the front moved in and the number of soldiers in the area was radically reduced. They took on the character not of armed fighting, but of mutual minor skirmishes and bloody pacifications of the civilian population. Most of the actions were aimed at forcing the Ukrainian population to join the displacement action to the USSR.

After the passage of the front, the first action was an attack by unknown perpetrators on 8 February 1945 on the village of Iskań, during which 15 people of Ukrainian nationality were killed. On 13 February, 3 Ukrainians on night guard were killed in Przedmieście Dubieckie.

On 16 February, the combined Polish groups of Jan Kotwicki "Ślepy" from Borownica and Ludwik Grodecki from Bircza, numbering 150-200 people in total, attacked the villages of Jawornik Ruski, Żohatyn, Piątkowa and the hamlets of Poruty and Zahuty, killing at least 27 people.

On 3 March, Polish partisan and local self-defence units committed the Pawłokoma massacre as an act of reprisal to similar attacks carried out on Polish civilians by the Ukrainian Insurgent Army. Most likely on 6 March a People's Security Guard unit attacked the village of Skopów killing 67 Ukrainians On March 25 In response to the killing of 7 polish soldiers, an Internal Security Corps unit attacked the village of Stary Lubliniec killing 540 people (including Banderites) On April 6, the Poles attacked Gorajec, with the main goal to liquidate the local UPA unit in the village, murdering 400 people.

On 11 April a Post Peasant Battalion unit attacked Bachów resulting in the murder of 100 Ukrainians. On that same day the Poles killed 26 Ukrainians in Sufczyna and 180 in Brzuska.

On March 31, in retaliation for the killing of a Pole, self-defense from Wiązownica. led by Michał Orzechowski, attacked Ukrainians hiding in nearby manor buildings. Ten people were killed, mostly women and children. This murder triggered UPA retaliation. April 17, "Zalizniak hit Wiązownica. During the action, 65 Poles died and 170 houses burned down. The self- defense from Piwoda, the NZW "Radwana" unit, the Home Army group of "Podhalański" and government troops came to the aid of the attacked. Thanks to this, the stolen cattle and livestock were recovered. At the same time, the Ukrainian camp in Mołodiczna was attacked, where 5 Ukrainians were killed. In retaliation unit led by Józef Zadzierski "Wołyniak" attacked Piskorowice, the attack on the village and its outskirts led to the death of 1,344 people.

=== Hrubieszów, Tomaczów and Lubaczów counties ===
On 2 March 1945, a battle took place in Mrzyglody and nearby Gruszka between UPA units and NKVD border troops supported by Post Home-Army units numbering around 200 men. 62 UPA soldiers were killed in the battle, including commanders Oleksa Mazur and Vasyl Dmytryszyn.

On March 25, 1945, in the early morning hours, a UPA unit arrived in Kryłów . The UPA took over the village and set up posts on its outskirts. The remaining group of nationalists in Soviet Army uniforms approached the Citizens' Militia Post and broke into the building by surprise, taking over the building. The Ukrainians recognized Maj. Stanisław Basaj, alias "Ryś", the commander of the Peasant Battalions during World War II, who was found and detained in one of the houses in Kryłów. He was placed in the corner of the room, his coat and shoes were taken away, and then he was abused. The perpetrators also undressed the 17 MO officers lying on the floor and tied up, and then shot them all. Ukrainian nationalists also murdered 28 civilian residents of Kryłów.

On September 17, 1945, Maryan Lukasevich perpetrator of the Kryłów Massacre was burned alive by the Polish police in his shelter in Żniatyn.

=== Outcome in 1945 ===
Jan Pisuliński writes that as a result of the Polish-Ukrainian conflict in 1945 in the Przemyśl and Dobromil regions 1,000 Ukrainians were killed by the National Armed Forces and the Home Army, while Polish losses are unknown.

=== UPA–AK armistice ===
In the beginning of 1945, Yuriy Lopatynsky was transferred to Galicia, where he met with Roman Shukhevych and conveyed instructions from Stepan Bandera and Mykola Lebed. The instructions called for negotiations with the Polish underground. On April 10, the regional OUN leadership in Zakerzonia issued a decree banning anti-Polish actions. The only exception was Poles fighting on the side of the Soviet Union.

On 21 May, 1945, the Ukrainian Insurgent Army and former AK troops concluded an alliance in the village of Ruda Różaniecka. On 27 May, this was followed by a joint UPA-AK attack on Citizens' Militia (MO) outposts in Variazh, likely a first such major action of the alliance. The insurgents distributed leaflets to the local population to inform them about the new UPA-AK alliance in the area.

== Post-World War II (1945–1947) ==
In view of Germany's defeat in World War II, the UPA and the OUN could not count on any outside support.

After the front had passed, the UPA had the upper hand in the Bieszczady Mountains. With no army in the area, UPA fighters were quick to liquidate newly-established citizen militia posts. Only Soviet NKVD units were able to successfully oppose the UPA. On 1 July 1945, the Polish 8th Infantry Division received orders to move to the region of Krosno and Sanok. The 32nd, 34th and 36th infantry regiments and the 37th artillery regiment were directed to the Bieszczady region. The 8th Infantry Division also secured the Czechoslovak border from the village of Ciechania to the railway station in the village of Uzhok.

The years 1945–1946 saw the UPA's superiority over the Home Army. Initially, all of the UPA's attention was directed towards the organising MO posts. After the arrival of the Home Army in the Bieszczady Mountains, the UPA started to attack military units; the UPA command was particularly keen to unblock the Polish borders. It was then that the idea was born to liquidate the WOP watchtowers. The UPA concentrated its forces and liquidated most of the watchtowers with their crews. Only a few soldiers managed to escape death. Operational groups that went to the aid of the watchtowers also fell into ambushes, such as the one near Kozhny.

Between 1945 and 1946, the UPA launched three attacks on Bircza, which ended with the repulsion of UPA attacks by the Polish services and army.

On 20 March 1946, the UPA committed a crime against WOP soldiers and MO officers in Jasiel.

On the night of 27–28 May 1946, the UPA, together with the Freedom and Independence Association (Zrzeszenie Wolność i Niezawisłość), carried out a successful attack on Hrubieszów, during which a post of the Citizen's Militia (WOP) was destroyed and political prisoners were freed from the local prison.

Initially, the military conducted "demonstration marches", which consisted of marches and demonstrations of force. These did not have any positive effect. Therefore, in January 1946, operational groups with battalion strength were formed. Four of them were formed in the 8th DP. The change of tactics by the army began to bring positive results. The UPA began to suffer losses. Operational Group "Rzeszów" was established, which operated from April to October 1946. During this time, according to statistics, 910 Ukrainians were killed and over 1,000 arrested. GO "Rzeszów" failed to complete its main task, that is, to smash UPA units and liquidate the OUN civilian network. The command, seeing the ineffectiveness of the actions, disbanded GO "Rzeszów" on 31 October.

In its place, three groupings were formed:

- Lt. Col. Bielecki's group,
- Lt. Col. Wygnański's group,
- Lt. Col. Zwoliński's group.

Lt. Col. Bielecki's grouping covered the Bieszczady Mountains. The 32pp, 34pp and special units of the 9th ID were subordinated to the grouping.

=== Operation Vistula ===
In February 1947, several Internal Security Corps (KBW) operational groups were sent to fight UPA units. These units were well armed and equipped and, importantly, had experience in fighting partisans. The beginning of 1947 saw intensified UPA operations. On 28 March, Deputy Minister of National Defence and General Karol Świerczewski was killed in an ambush near Jabłonki. His death accelerated Operation Vistula, which had been under preparation since autumn 1946, consisting of the displacement of inhabitants from the UPA's areas of operation. This operation resulted in the resettlement of 140,000 Ukrainians from the Bieszczady Mountains deep into the Recovered Territories and brought an end to the major activities of the UPA in the summer of 1947. From 1948 to 1951, another 70,000 Ukrainians were deported from Zakerzonia.

During Operation Vistula, eleven UPA commanders were killed in Poland. On June 13 near Zawadka, Yaroslav Kotsolok was killed in an ambush organized by the 1st Prague Infantry Regiment. On 4 July, Hryhoriy Yankivskyi was killed during a skirmish with the Polish Army near Leszczawa Dolna.

After Operation Vistula, UPA combat units left the territory of Poland, breaking through to the West or to the USSR to continue the fight. Only small groups remained in Poland to provide a link between the West and the USSR. Fighting them continued until the autumn of 1948.

=== Outcome and casualties ===
Overall, from June 1945 to March 1947, 4,000 UPA partisans were killed. During Operation Vistula 1,500 UPA partisans were killed. Stanisław Kłos states that during the period, 2,200 Poles were killed, 600 of which were civilians; while UPA losses counted 4,900 killed. According to another source, Polish losses amounted to 8,100 killed, Soviet losses 5,000 killed, and UPA losses an estimated 8,700 killed.

The 1945–1947 phase of the conflict ended with a Polish victory. The UPA in all regions murdered approximately 60,000–100,000 Polish civilians. The Home Army, in "retaliatory actions", murdered around 15,000–30,000 Ukrainians. Poles were forced to give up their claims to Kresy and accept the Curzon Line division. The UPA’s anti-Polish activities in Volyn and Galicia only ceased after Soviet deportation of Poles. This completed the ethnic homogenization policy begun by the UPA. American historian Timothy Snyder described it as an "unofficially cooperative effort of the NKVD and the UPA".

== Aftermath ==
During the Soviet struggle to establish control over Western Ukraine, NKVD units dressed as UPA fighters committed atrocities in order to demoralize the civilian population, and to turn the people against nationalist groups. Both Polish and Ukrainian researchers note the significant number of civilian casualties at the hands of Soviet and Polish communist partisans, as well as special NKVD units. The number of civilian victims killed by the NKVD is unknown.

Another result of the conflict was the population exchange between Poland and Soviet Ukraine, where about 480,000 people behind the Curzon Line were moved eastward to the territory, which became a part of the Soviet Ukraine and Belarus.

The main perpetrator of massacres of the Poles in Volhynia was UPA Colonel Dmytro Klyachkivsky, who was killed by the NKVD in Orzhiv on 12 February 1945. The UPA commander-in-chief Roman Shukhevych was one of the perpetrators of massacres of the Poles in Eastern Galicia; he committed suicide when the approximately 700 NKVD soldiers besieged his house in the village of Bilohorscha, Lviv Oblast, on 5 March 1950. Another perpetrator of massacring around 5,000 Polish civilians in the summer of 1943, Junior Lieutenant Yuriy Stelmaschuk, was executed in Kyiv on 5 October 1945. UPA Lieutenant Volodymyr Schyhelskyi and Colonel Myroslav Onyshkevych were executed by Polish authorities on 7 April 1949 and 6 July 1950, respectively.

=== Commemoration ===
In 2017 the Polish government added to the Tomb of the Unknown Soldier 22 places where the Poles fought the UPA and the OUN between 1943 and 1946: Huta Stepańska and Wyrka, Przebraże, Pańska Dolina, Rybcza, Zasmyki, Jagodzin Rymacze, Kupiczów, Hanaczów, Stanisławówka, Łukowiec Wiszniowski, Łukowiec Żurawski, Puzow Stężarzyce, Korytnica, Biłka Królewska, Biłka Szlachecka, Narol, Posadów, Rzeczyca and Bircza.

== See also ==
- Krasnyi Sad Massacre
- Pyskorovychy Massacre
- Massacre in Berezka
- Wierzchowiny massacre
- Terka Massacre
- The Sivchyna Massacre
- Skopów Massacre
- Gorajec Massacre
- Zawadka Morochowska massacres
- Pawłokoma massacre
- Bachów Massacre
- Remel massacre
- Massacre in Bukovina
- Mołożów massacre
- Massacre in Strilsy
- Ruda Różaniecka massacre
- Łasków and Szychowice massacres
- Mołożów massacre

== Sources ==
- Subtelny, Orest (1988). Ukraine: A History. University of Toronto Press. ISBN 0-8020-5808-6.
- Subtelny, Orest (2000). Ukraine: A History. University of Toronto Press.
- Snyder, Timothy (2003b). "The Causes of Ukrainian-Polish Ethnic Cleansing 1943". Past & Present (179): 197–234. doi:10.1093/past/179.1.197. JSTOR 3600827.
