= Attack of Maziarnia Wawrzkowa =

- Part of the Massacres of the Poles in the Volhynia and Galicia during the Polish–Ukrainian ethnic conflict in the World War II
Date	24–25 March 1944
Location	Maziarnia Wawrzkowa
Result	Polish victory

Belligerents
Polish Self–Defense; Home Army	Ukrainian Insurgent Army

Commanders and leaders
Jan Lewicki †; Józefa Późniaka	Unknown

Strength
Unknown	Unknown

Casualties and losses
21 killed	12 killed
- 7 Polish civilians killed

The Attack of Maziarnia Wawrzkowa or Battle of Maziarnia Wawrzkowa took place between the Ukrainian Insurgent Army and the Home Army in the Lviv Oblast, in Maziarnia Wawrzkowa, It took place on March 24–25, 1944.

== Prelude ==
According to the memoirs of Franciszek Woronowski, on September 14, 1943, in Lviv, he received an order from the Command of the South-Eastern Area of the Home Army to organize the self-defense of Polish villages in the north-western part of the Tarnopol Voivodeship. The Area Command feared that the forces of the UPA, concentrated in Volhynia, might begin the massacre of the Polish population in Eastern Lesser Poland.

The operational base for the self-defense was established in a triangle marked by the villages of Maziarnia Wawrzkowa, Grabowa, and Huta Połoniecka. This area included a cluster of 17 villages that were either entirely Polish or had a majority Polish population.

== Attack ==
The massive UPA attack on Maziarnia Wawrzkowa took place late in the evening of 24 March 1944. The village was attacked simultaneously from all sides. A Soviet partisan unit that appeared in Maziarnia around noon that day left the village after the first shots. Maziarnia was surrounded and fired at with incendiary ammunition, which caused a fire in the thatched houses, which made an organised defence impossible. The self-defence soldiers were forced to withdraw to the last line of defence, which was the church (where civilians had taken shelter) and the buildings surrounding it. They also defended themselves behind the Ukrainian attack in individual buildings with sheet metal roofs, which the UPA failed to set on fire. Several attempts by the UPA to capture the church failed, and the attackers ended their assault on the village around 4 a.m. As a result of the all-night fight, 28 people died, including 21 members of the self-defense. Among them was the commander of the AK platoon Jan Lewicki. At least 2 defenders of Maziarnia were seriously wounded. About 12 people died on the Ukrainian side. The entire village burned down, except for a few buildings.

== Aftermath ==
After the battle, a German reconnaissance plane circled over Maziarnia Wawrzkowa, but it did not shell the village. Before noon on March 25, 1944, a UPA reconnaissance unit appeared in the area, which was forced to withdraw.

The destruction of the village forced the self-defense to evacuate the wounded and civilians to other villages. Dugouts were dug for the soldiers and a bunker was set up for the self-defense command.

== Works cited ==
- Markowski, Damian Karol (2023). W cieniu Wołynia: "antypolska akcja" OUN i UPA w Galicji Wschodniej 1943-1945 (Wydanie 1-sze ed.). Kraków: Wydawnictwo Literackie. ISBN 978-83-08-08166-2.
- Wołczański, Józef (2006). Eksterminacja narodu polskiego i Kościoła rzymskokatolickiego przez ukraińskich nacjonalistów w Małopolsce wschodniej w latach 1939-1945: materiały źródłowe. Cz. 2. Biblioteka Historyczna Archiwum Metropolii Lwowskiej Obrządku Łacińskiego w Krakowie. Seria A, Źródła i Materiały. Kraków: Wydawnictwo Bł. Jakuba Strzemię Archidiecezji Lwowskiej Ob. Łac. ISBN 978-83-916412-4-8.
- Kulińska, Lucyna; Kulińska, Lucyna (2001). Dzieje Komitetu Ziem Wschodnich na tle losów ludności polskich Kresów w latach 1943-1947. T. 2: Dokumenty i materiały zgromadzone przez działaczy i członków KZW. Kraków: Abrys. ISBN 978-83-85827-72-6.
