= Łasków and Szychowice massacres =

1944 Polish massacre of Ukrainians

Łasków and Szychowice Massacres
- Part of the Hrubieszów revolution during the Polish-Ukrainian conflict (1939-1947)
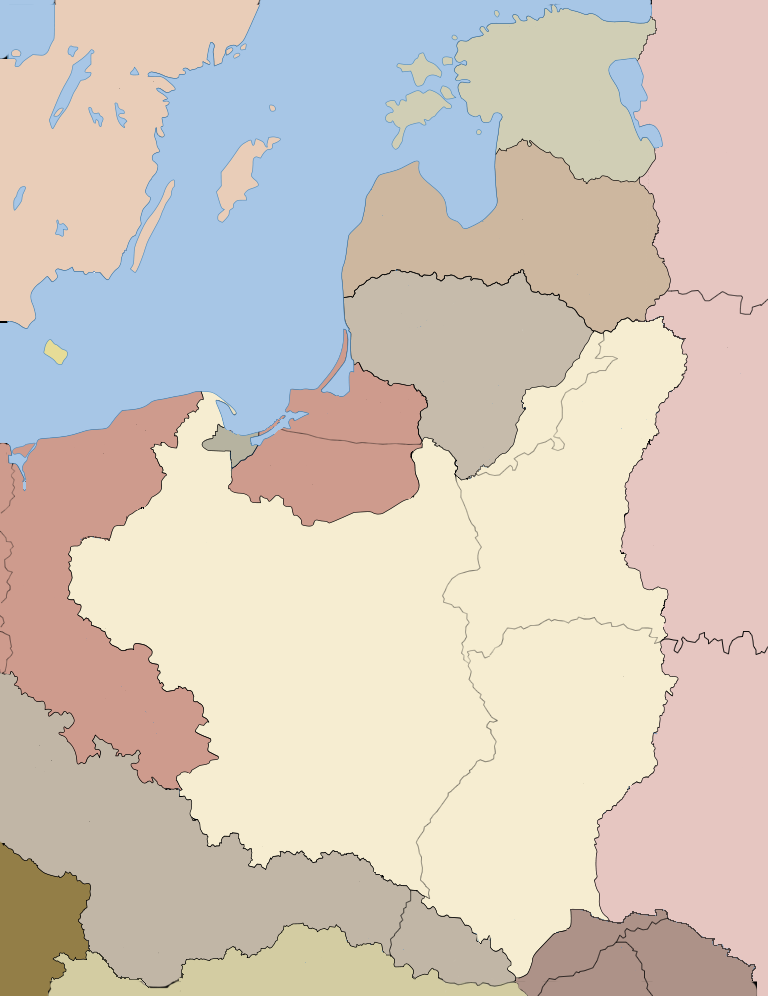
- Łasków (Poland)
- Time: 10th of March, 1944
- Location: Łasków and Szychowice
- Motive: Retaliation for the Volhynian Massacre; Arrival of UPA units in the Area
- Perpetrators: Peasant Battalions under the command of Stanisław Basaj and Stefan Kwaśniewski
- Outcome: Massacres of Ukrainian Population
- Deaths: 138 Ukrainians in Szychowice; 186-330 in Łasków; Total - 324–468 Ukrainians killed

The Łasków and Szychowice massacres were massacres against the Ukrainian population of Łasków and Szychowice in 1944. They took place on the same day as the Sahryń massacre.

== Background ==
=== The village ===
The village of Łasków lies in the Hrubieszów County in the Lublin Voivodeship. According to the 1921 census, the village consisted of 62 farms and had 339 inhabitants. 11 of these were recorded as Poles, 324 as Ukrainians and 4 as Jews. Among them were 14 Roman Catholics, 321 Orthodox Christians and 4 followers of Judaism. The nearby colony of Łasków consisted of 35 residential houses and had 283 inhabitants. All were registered as Poles. Among them were 228 Roman Catholics and 55 Orthodox Christians. In 1938 as part of the Revindication of Eastern Orthodox churches in the Second Polish Republic the local orthodox church was taken down.

=== World War II ===
In 1943 a branch of the Ukrainian National Self-Defence was established in Łasków. In March 1943 Stanisław Basaj's unit liquidated the Ukrainian Post in Łasków, as well as in the villages in Szychowice, Kryłów and Mircze. In February 1944 the Polish-Ukrainian conflict in the region escalated. And in March Polish units decided on a mass action on Ukrainian villages.

In the evening of 7 March 1944, in the forest Lipowiec near Tyszowiec, a concentration of the Tomaszów AK troops took place, in the strength of about 1200 soldiers, under the command of Lieutenant Zenon Jachymek "Wiktor". A second grouping of about 800 soldiers was commanded by Lieutenant Eugeniusz Sioma "Lech". A pre-emptive attack on 9-10 March was planned by Hrubieszów District commander Marian Gołębiewski, the Home Army and the Peasant Battalions planned to capture Sahryń, Uhrynow, Szychowice and Łaskow on the aforementioned days.

== The massacre ==
Stanisław Basaj under the orders of the Home Army was sent to attack the villages of Łasków and Szychowice on the same day that Home Army forces would attack Sahryń and Uhrynów. After capturing Sahryń Styanisław Basaj's unit attacked Szychowice which was defended by a 200 man unit. as a result of the attack on Szychowice the village was captured, and the local Ukrainian population was killed. After capturing Szychowice the Poles attacked Łasków. The attack resulted in the dispersal of the Ukrainian unit defending it and the killing of the local Ukrainian population.

== Aftermath ==
The attack on Łasków and Szychowice was a success for Basaj's unit, the Ukrainians and Germans lost a total of 120 SS men, 20 German gendarmes, 50 Ukrainian policemen killed while many UPA and USN nationalists were wounded. Basaj's unit only lost 1 man killed and 2 were wounded, however the capture of both villages resulted in the killing of Ukrainian civilians. In Szychowice 137 Ukrainians were killed. In Łasków 186 Ukrainians were killed. The victims probably accounted for about 17.2% of the Ukrainian population in Szychowice and 57.4% in Łasków. Among the killed Ukrainians was Orthodox priest Lev Korobchuk. The attacks of March 10, 1944, on Łasków, Szychowice and Sahryń, were the first acts of the action taken by the Polish underground against the civilian Ukrainian population living in the Hrubieszów county, the so-called Hrubieszów revolution. Overall that day 14 villages were attacked, according to Zajączkowski 700 people were killed. According to Bożyk 1,500 Ukrainians were killed that day. Upper estimates put the number of Ukrainian civilians killed at 2,000.

The Hrubieszow revolution was the largest anti-Ukrainian action of the Polish underground. In retaliation, the Organisation of Ukrainian Nationalists-Ukrainian Insurgent Army (OUN-UPA) stepped up anti-Polish actions ongoing in the region, pacifying dozens of Polish villages. The result was the formation of a kilometer-long front and a guerrilla war.

On 1 September 2026, Ukrainian deputy culture minister Ivan Verbytskyi announced that the Polish government had granted permission to send a team to carry out exploratory work in Łasków, in order to search for the remains of villagers killed in the massacre.

== Bibliography ==
- Zajączkowski, Mariusz (2015). Ukraińskie podziemie na Lubelszczyźnie w okresie okupacji niemieckiej 1939–1944 [Ukrainian underground in the Lublin region during the German occupation 1939-1944] (in Polish). Lublin-Warsaw: Institute of National Rememberence.
