= Ruda Różaniecka massacre =

- Part of Polish-Ukrainian ethnic conflict
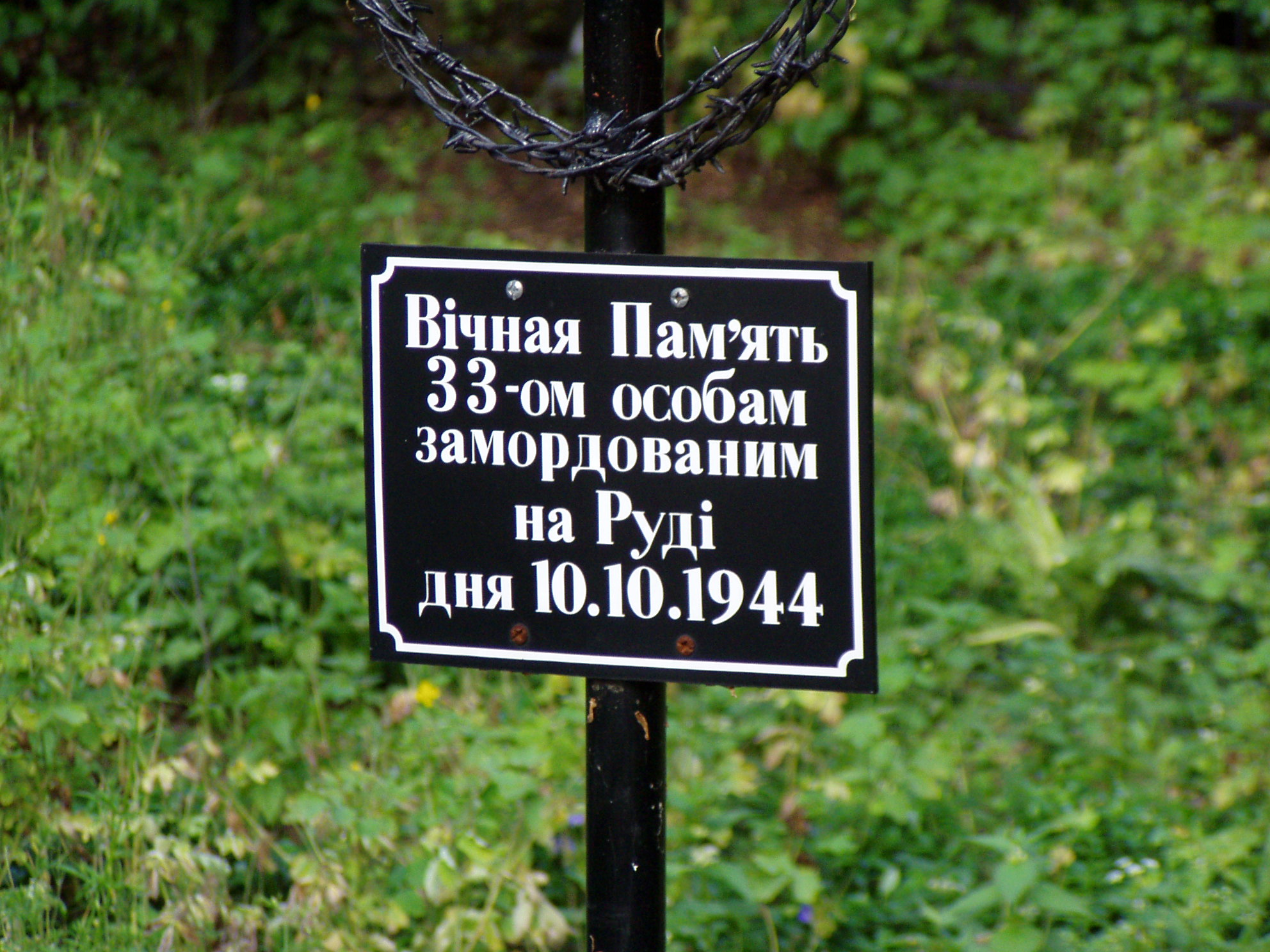
- A plaque on the grave of innocent hostages
- Location: Ruda Różaniecka, Poland
- Date: October 10, 1944
- Target: Ukrainians
- Attack type: Mass shootings
- Deaths: 32-33 Ukrainians
- Perpetrator: Milicja Obywatelska
- Motive: Anti-Ukrainian sentiment

Ruda Różaniecka massacre (Polish: Zbrodnia w Rudzie Różanieckiej; Ukrainian: Вбивства в Руді-Ружанецькій) — execution of Ukrainians in Ruda Różaniecka (now - in the Subcarpathian Voivodeship of Poland), committed on October 10, 1944, by soldiers (military police) of the Milicja Obywatelska and local Poles, in retribution for the killing of Polish foresters & game keepers, resulting in the death of 33 Ukrainians (according to other sources - 32). Relatives of those killed only after the eviction learned about the fate of their loved ones, but do not know the place of their burials.

== Chronology of Events ==
On October 9, 1944, on the dikes near the hamlet of Lubliniec Nowy – Ostrówka, the commander of the third swarm of Lubliniec self-defense pseudonym "Sasza" attacked a forester and three gamekeepers from Ruda Różaniecka, who went there in order to detect and punish the perpetrators of illegal logging. Three of them were abducted, while one managed to escape and inform the military police (MO) post in Ruda Różaniecka about the whole incident. All trace of the abductees was lost. The inhabitants of Ruda accused the Ukrainians from Lubliniec Nowy of the attack.

As a result of the retaliatory action, which was carried out by the militia forces from the posts in Ruda Różaniecka, Cieszanów and Folwark, guided by the principle of collective responsibility, 35 hostages were abducted from Lubliniec Nowy. Soon, two people, including Father Kozenko, were released so that he could give the villagers an ultimatum. The condition of the ultimatum was the return of the kidnapped foresters before the end of the day. Otherwise, all the remaining hostages were threatened with execution (one of the hostages was killed while trying to escape near the ponds). The remaining Ukrainians were imprisoned at the MO station in Ruda Różaniecka. After the deadline for the ultimatum expired and the condition was not met, on October 10, 1944, all hostages were shot.

The murdered were buried nearby in old trenches, after some time the bodies were dug up and moved to another, unknown place. The bodies have not been found to date. The symbolic grave of the murdered is located at the Greek Catholic cemetery in Lubliniec.

== Termination of the investigation ==
By a decision of September 18, 2002, Elżbieta Barnas-Lubas, prosecutor of the Commission for the Investigation of Crimes against the Polish People in Rzeszów, terminated the investigation into the November 9–10, 1944 murder of 32 Ukrainians, residents of Lubliniec-Nowy, Lubliniec-Stary and nearby villages of Lubaczów County. The investigation established that Ukrainians were arrested by Milicja Obywatelska and the "security government" led by the head of the police department in Ruda-Ruzhanetska, who were beaten and shouted: "You, Ukrainian!". The bodies of the shot men, as well as women with children, were thrown to be torn to pieces by wild beasts. The prosecutor admitted that their only fault was that they were Ukrainians, that it was a well-planned action by the Polish leadership to oust the Ukrainians, and that it was a crime against humanity that has no expiration date. However, citing the lack of archival documents and the fact that some of the former police officers have already died, others cannot be traced, and those who are alive and who testify that they took part in the arrest say they have forgotten everything, the prosecutor stopped investigation into the murder. At the same time, the prosecutor did not find out who planned the murder and who committed it.

== See also ==
- Wierzchowiny massacre
- Sahryń massacre
- Pawłokoma massacre

== Literature ==
- 1947. Пропам'ятна Книга / Зібрав та до друку зладив Богдан Гук. — Варшава, «Тирса», 1997.
