= Mołożów massacre =

- Part of Polish-Ukrainian ethnic conflict
- Location: Mołożów, Lublin Voivodeship
- Date: May 6, 1943
- Target: Ukrainian citizens living in Mołożów and Strzelce
- Deaths: 54 Ukrainian citizens killed (according to the OUN)
- Injuries: 10 citizens
- Perpetrator: Kedyw unit
- No. of participants: Around 80 Polish Kedyw members
- Motive: Retaliation for the Massacres of Poles in Volhynia and Eastern Galicia

The Mołożów massacre (Polish: Zbrodnia w Mołożowie; Ukrainian: Різанина в Моложеві) was a massacre of Ukrainian civilians in Poland, by members of the Polish Home Army "Kedyw" unit on May 6, 1943.

On 6 May 1943, a Kedyw unit estimated at approximately 80 fighters according to German intelligence reports attacked Mołożów and the nearby village of Strzelce. The assault resulted in widespread destruction and civilian casualties.

German reports documented three villagers killed by shooting, several wounded, six people burned to death, and seven severely burned. The attackers set fire to approximately 60 households and destroyed livestock, including 29 cattle, 15 horses, and 34 pigs. OUN reported 54 fatalities in both villages combined, predominantly men, with some women among the dead, and confirm the destruction of 59 households.

== Background ==
During World War II, escalating ethnic tensions between Poles and Ukrainians in border regions led to cycles of violence. Polish resistance groups, including Kedyw, frequently conducted reprisal attacks against villages suspected of harboring Ukrainian nationalists or collaborating with occupying forces.

== Aftermath ==
The massacre intensified the ongoing ethnic conflict in the region, contributing to further reprisals and violence between Polish and Ukrainian communities. Mołożów and Strzelce were left devastated, with survivors forced to rebuild amid the wider turmoil of the war.
