= Bachów Massacre =

Extermination of the Ukrainian population of the village of Bachów

Bachów massacre
- Part of the Polish–Ukrainian conflict (1939–1947)
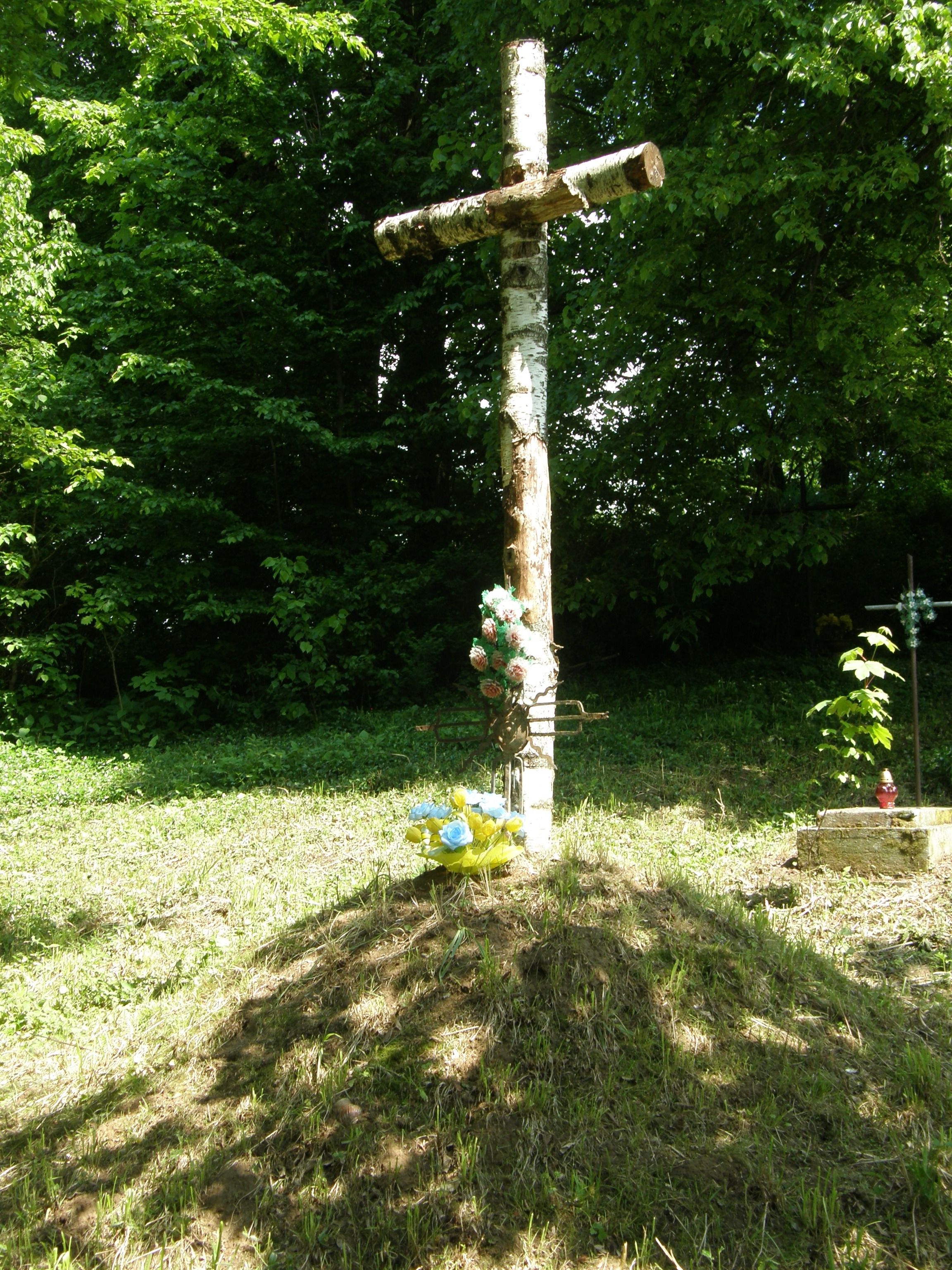
- Location: Bachów,Przemyśl County, Poland
- Date: 11 April 1945
- Target: Ukrainian civillians
- Attack type: Genocidal massacre, war crime
- Deaths: ~ 100 civilians killed
- Perpetrators: Home Army; Peasant Battalions; Local Polish population
- Motive: Genocidal intent, anti-Ukrainian sentiment

The Bachów massacre was the extermination of the Ukrainian population of the village of Bachów, carried out on April 11, 1945, by units of the Home Army (probably from the Lviv District of the Home Army), the Khlopsky Battalions, and Polish peasants from surrounding villages.

== Background ==
Bachów is a village in the administrative district of Gmina Krywcza, within Przemyśl County, Subcarpathian Voivodeship, in southern Poland. It lies on the southern bank of the Siąg River, 4 kilometres (2.5 mi) west of the administrative centre of the gmina Krywcza, 20 kilometres (12 mi) west of the county seat of Przemyśl, and 44 kilometres (27 mi) southeast of the voivodeship centre of Rzeszów.

Originally, the old Ruthenian settlement of Stupnica (Polish: Stupnica) was located on the site of Bachov, granted to the Kmits (Polish: Kmitom) in 1389. After its destruction by the Mongol-Tatars, the settlement of Bachów-Mogiła (Polish: Bachów-Mogiła) arose. The memory of Stupnica or Stupniki (Polish: Stupniku) has survived to modern times: the hamlet of Bachov was called that way back in 1890, as well as the Stupnica River, which flows through the village.

Before the outbreak of World War II, the population of Bachów was approximately 2,112 people. The majority of them (about 65%) were Ukrainians. The village also had Poles (660 people, or 31%) and Jews (74, or less than 4%).

Starting in 1942, the Polish pro-communist and anti-communist underground, with the support of the local Polish population, terrorized the Ukrainian population of Lemko, Kholm, and Nadsyany, exterminating patriotic Ukrainians with their families at every opportunity and intimidating everyone else. In the winter of 1943–1944, this activity only intensified, especially on the part of units of the Home Army. The UPA leadership, seeking understanding, issued several appeals to the Poles, in which, in particular, recalling the Katyn massacre, but a fight side by side against the common enemy. And to protect the Ukrainian population, in April 1944, a hundred "Vovka" under the command of Yagoda-Chernyk and two kurens from Colonel Ostrozhsky's detachment were redeployed from Volyn to the Kholm region to help the local underground, and a hundred UPA from the "Siromantsi" kuren under the command of Yastrub were redeployed from the Carpathian forests to Posyannya. Under the protection of these units and under the leadership of the UPA foremen who had arrived in Zakerzon, Self-Defense Bush Units and local UPA units were created in Ukrainian villages, united in 11 hundreds of Zakerzon, namely: hundreds of Baidy, Gromenko, Nechay, Ostap, Chorny, and the Evgen and Ren kurens (each consisting of three hundreds). As the front line approached, probably to avoid confrontation with large military units of the Red Army and the Wehrmacht, and in accordance with the instructions of the High Command, these 11 hundreds under the general leadership of Vasyl Mizerny (Ren) carried out a raid into the Carpathians to the Chorny Forest. The arriving units also returned to the Volyn and Carpathian forests. And the armed formations of the Poles, who had stopped their attacks during the stay of the UPA units, now resumed their actions against the Ukrainians.

At the beginning of August 1944, the village was captured by the Soviet union.

== Massacre ==
On April 11, 1945, units of the Home Army (probably from the Lviv District of the Home Army), the Peasant Battalions, and Polish peasants from surrounding villages attacked Bakhiv, resulting in the murder of about 100 Ukrainian residents of Bachów. One of the leading members of the armed group that carried out these murders was Franciszek Żurawski, an assistant priest from the village of Babičy.

On the same day, a large number of Ukrainians were also murdered in neighboring villages: 180 people in Berezka (Berezka Massacre), and 26 people in Sivchyna (Sivchyna Massacre).

One of those accused of killing Ukrainians in Berezka and Bachów is Roman Kisiel (Polish: Roman Kisiel ps. Sęp, Korfanty) and the Polish partisan unit (Polish: Ludowa Straż Bezpieczeństwa, LSB) led by him, created on the basis of the peasant battalions. They are also accused of many other murders of Ukrainians in Poland, including, among others, in Malkowice (138 people), Skopów (at least 67 people, according to the inscription on the tombstone 150-180 people), Korytniki (53 people), Trojczyce (28 people), Wola-Krywiecki (27 people).

The Soviet authorities used the facts of the torture to discredit the Poles and, at the same time, as one of the arguments in favor of resettling Ukrainians from the territory of Zakerzonie to the USSR. As Petro Mirchuk claims:

"Polish terror is unconditionally supported by the Moscow NKVD, so that it can point to it and give the persecuted Ukrainians vicious "advice": Flee from the Polish bandits to Ukraine, move to the Ukrainian SSR."
