= Grodysławice =

- Village
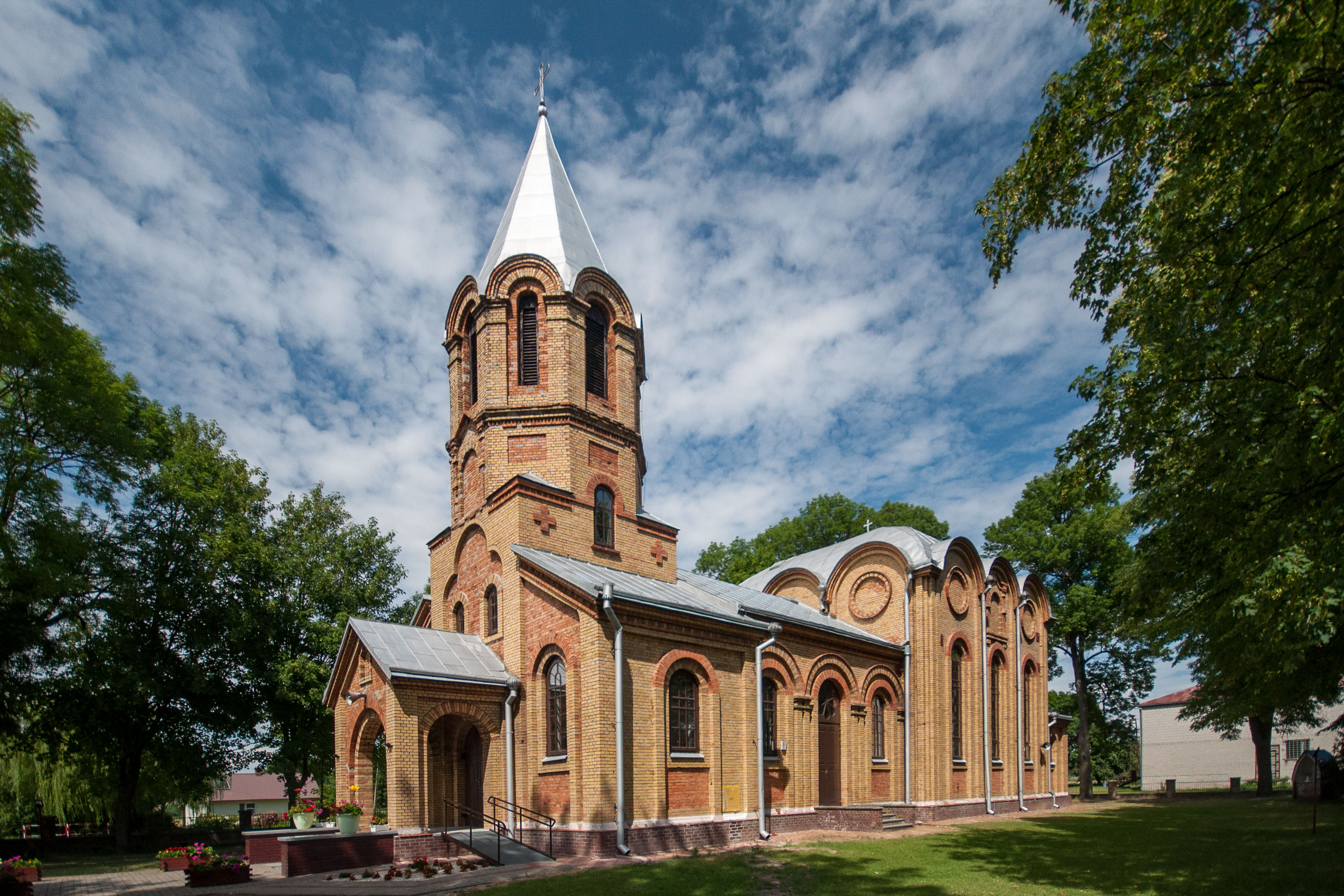
- Regina Mundi church in Grodysławice

- Location within Poland
- Coordinates: 50°32′N 23°37′E
- Country: Poland
- Voivodeship: Lublin
- County: Tomaszów
- Gmina: Rachanie
- Time zone: UTC+1 (CET)
  - Summer (DST): UTC+2 (CEST)

Grodysławice [ɡrɔdɨswaˈvit͡sɛ] is a village in the administrative district of Gmina Rachanie, within Tomaszów County, Lublin Voivodeship, in eastern Poland.

== History ==
Twelve Polish citizens were murdered by Nazi Germany in the village during World War II.
