= Defence of Maziarnia–Wawrykova–Hrabova–Huta Pieniacka =

Fight between Ukrainian Insurgent Army and Polish units

Defense of Maziarnia Wawrykova–Hrabova–Huta Pieniacka
- Part of World War II
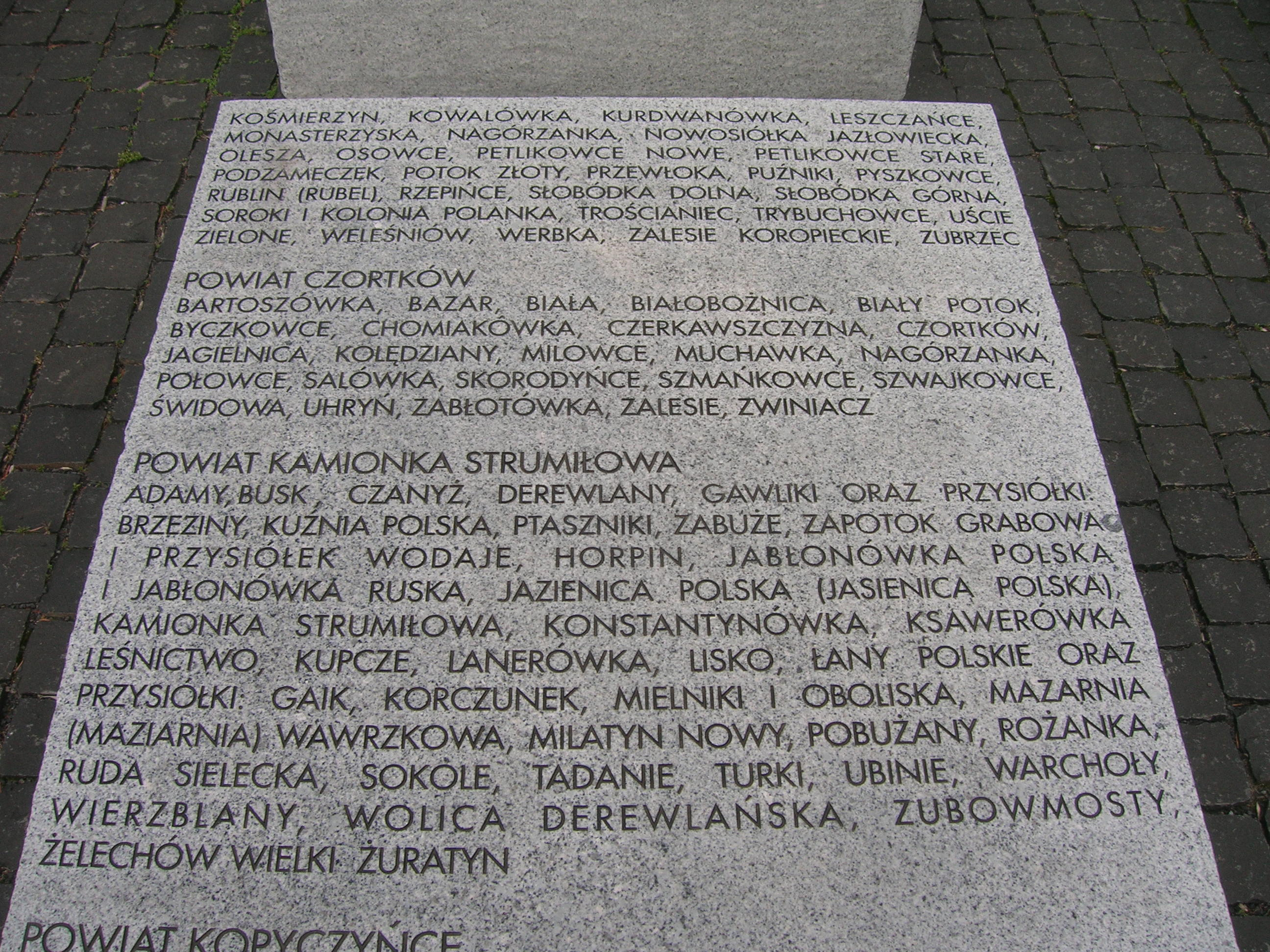
- A plaque on the monument to the victims of the OUN-UPA crimes against Polish citizens in Warsaw, mentioning the villages affected during the defense: Adami, Hrabova, Yazenitsa Polska, Lany Polska, Maziarnia Wawrykova, and Warkholy
Date	1943 — May 1944
Location	The villages of Maziarnia Wawrykova, Hrabova, and Huta Pieniacka in Eastern Galicia
Result	Ukrainian–German victory: Complete elimination of the Polish units by UPA and Nazi Germany

Belligerents
Ukrainian Insurgent Army; Nazi Germany	Polish self-defense

Commanders and leaders
unknown	Franciszek Woronowski; Kazimierz Kamiński †; Stanisław Sobański †

Casualties and losses
	Many killed including several officers

The Defense of Maziarnia Wawrykova–Hrabova–Huta Pieniacka was a series of clashes between the Ukrainian Insurgent Army and Polish self-defense units from 1943 to May 1944. The fighting took place in the “triangle” between the villages of Maziarnia Wawrykova, Hrabova, and Huta Pieniacka. As a result of the prolonged fighting, UPA forces and local German units eliminated the Polish forces in the triangle.

== Background ==
On 14 September 1943, in Lviv, Franciszek Woronowski received an order from the command of the Lviv District of the Home Army to organize self-defense units in the northwestern part of the former Tarnopol Voivodeship. The operational center of the self-defense in this area became the “triangle” between Maziarnia Wawrykova, Hrabova, and Huta Pieniacka. The territory of this triangle contained 17 villages that were wholly or partially inhabited by Poles, namely:

- Lany Polska (now Prybuzhany)
- Yazenitsa Polska
- Budky Neznanivski
- Berbeky
- Pajonki
- Maziarnia Hoholova
- Toporiv
- Maidan
- Dombrova
- Sobashky
- Shlonzaky
- Warkholy
- Adamy

Using the forests east of Maziarnia Wawrykova as cover, the “triangle” was occupied by three self-defense companies and a reserve partisan detachment of the Home Army. In January 1944, communication problems arose between the villages controlled by the Polish self-defense, and in February of the same year the territory of the triangle was completely surrounded by forces of the Ukrainian Insurgent Army.

== German-Ukrainian collaboration ==
In the Kamionka Strumiłowa county, a local agreement was reached concerning cooperation between the UPA and the Germans. Despite the fact that on 10 April 1944, the UPA High Command prohibited its subordinates from conducting unauthorised negotiations with the Germans (exclusive authority to conduct such negotiations was reserved for the Central Provid of the OUN and the UPA High Command; this led to the execution of “Orzeł” for insubordination), according to Damian Karol Markowski, UPA cooperation with the Germans in Kamionka Strumiłowa County continued at least in the areas of combating Soviet partisans and eliminating Polish self-defense units.

At the same time, Soviet partisan activity provoked a German response, as the partisans penetrated areas controlled by the self-defense forces. As a result, the Berbeki self-defense unit was forced to engage in a joint battle with Ulyanov’s Soviet detachment against the Germans, who had been drawn to the village by the presence of the Soviets. After a two-hour exchange of fire, the Germans were repulsed. On another occasion, for the same reason, the area around Maziarnia Wawrzkowa, Toporów, and Huta Połoniecka was shelled by German artillery and aircraft.

== Timeline ==
=== Operation in Hrabova ===
On 27 January (according to other sources, at the beginning of February), a detachment of the Ukrainian Auxiliary Police attacked a forester’s lodge in Hrabova, where members of the Home Army and self-defense were present. Nine people were killed in the attack, including six officers and non-commissioned officers, notably Kazimierz Kamiński and Stanisław Sobański. The commander of the Polish self-defense in the “triangle” described these losses as “irreparable”.

=== Elimination of the Polish self-defense center ===
After negotiations between the Home Army and the UPA failed, in late April 1944 the UPA, together with local German units, launched a coordinated large-scale assault on the Polish positions in the “triangle”. The Germans advanced from the west, while the UPA attacked from the northeast. According to Woronowski, during the offensive the outposts west of the self-defense center were destroyed: Yazenitsa Polska, Budky Neznanivski, Berbeky, Pajonki and their hamlets, while resistance continued in Maziarnia Wawrykova, Huta Pieniacka, and Adami. On 3 May, the Germans finally destroyed Maziarnia Wawrykova, while on the same day the village of Warkholy was burned.

The final battles in the triangle ended in late May 1944.

== Result ==
The pacification of the “triangle” ended in complete victory for the Germans and the UPA. Several Polish villages were destroyed, and the area was cleared of Polish underground soldiers. The Germans gained hundreds of forced laborers while the Ukrainians eliminated a Polish center that was an obstacle to their route between Volhynia and Lviv.

== Sources ==
- Wolchański, Józef (2005). Eksterminacja narodu polskiego i Kościoła Rzymskokatolickiego przez ukraińskich nacjonalistów w Małopolsce Wschodniej w latach 1939-1945. Materiały źródłowe, cz. I. Kraków. ISBN 83-916412-2-8.
- Markowski, Damian Karol (2023). W cieniu Wołynia. „Antypolska akcja” OUN i UPA w Galicji Wschodniej 1943-1945. Kraków: Wydawnictwo Literackie. ISBN 978-83-08-08166-2.
- Wolchański, Józef (2006). Eksterminacja narodu polskiego i Kościoła Rzymskokatolickiego przez ukraińskich nacjonalistów w Małopolsce Wschodniej w latach 1939-1945. Materiały źródłowe, cz. II. Kraków. ISBN 83-916412-4-4.
- Motyka, Grzegorz (2006). Ukraińska partyzantka 1942-1960. Warsaw: Institute of Political Studies of the Polish Academy of Sciences, Oficyna Wydawnicza RYTM. ISBN 83-88490-58-3.
