= Wierzchowiny massacre =

Massacre of Ukrainians by Polish forces

- Part of "Beyond the Bug" campaign
- Wierzchowiny (Poland)
- Location: Wierzchowiny, Lublin Voivodeship, Poland
- Date: June 6, 1945
- Target: Ukrainians,Jehovah's Witnesses
- Attack type: Massacre
- Weapons: Firearms, axes, shovels and hoes
- Deaths: 194-196
- Perpetrator: National Armed Forces
- Motive: Anti-Ukrainian sentiment; Polish nationalism; Revenge for Massacres of Poles in Volhynia and Eastern Galicia; Devastation of the peace talks between WiN and UPA

The Wierzchowiny massacre was a massacre in the town of Wierzchowiny perpetrated by the National Armed Forces on 6 June 1945 led by Mieczysław Pazderski, also called "Szary" (Grey).

== Background ==
The reasons for the massacre differ between authors. According to some authors, some villagers allegedly supporting the upcoming communist regime, which was an enemy of the National Armed Forces (NSZ) that it wanted to avoid and stop at all costs. Historian Grzegorz Motyka stated that before the II World War, the Communist Party of Poland had influence in the region. It was also said that the citizens have collaborated with Soviet and Nazi governments. According to Grzegorz Motyka, the main motive was to rid the lands of minorities.

== Course of the massacre ==
Pazderski, without permission, decided to kill the most "dangerous" people. He had a list of people he planned to kill, which according to historian T. Swat was 30, while according to Motyka it was 19. On the morning of 6 July 1945, Szary's units entered Wierzchowiny and were greeted with great confusion from the local Ukrainian population. They returned later and committed the atrocity, murdering 196 locals. Other authors say that there were 194 casualties. Some NSZ reports state that there were 396 killed, while the Communists say that there were 400 casualties. Both of those sources have not been proved as reliable The majority of people killed were Orthodox, though there were also 16 to 30 Jehovah's Witnesses murdered.

Tadeusz S. stated that members of the NSZ that died were killed in the fighting which followed after the genocide when the armies tried to remove the bunkers hidden in the village. Based on the witnesses' testimonies, the casualties didn't exceed 50. After Szary's soldiers left the settlement at 6 PM, an unidentified unit performed another mass murder, which was probably an action to discredit him. Other authors say it was a possibility that the local Polish population did it. Historians Rafał Wnuk, Grzegorz Motyka and Mariusz Zajączkowski call the theories "hardly believable", as there is little to no proof for them. Wnuk and Motyka also said that Szary changed the original plan and instead of murdering only some people, he destroyed the entire village, as he hoped to gain additional support from the local Polish population that had a strongly anti-Ukrainian sentiment. After the village was burnt down, the armies headed towards Sielec.

== Aftermath ==
On 23 July 1945, the NSZ's official newspaper, Szczerbiec, admitted to committing the massacre and stated that they would commit similar atrocities if needed. Many disputes over the number of casualties began as more documents started to be uncovered. In the 90s, the NSZ tried to deny the massacre, which failed to find any relevance and did not change anything.

== Court problems ==
On 15 June 1953 the high court of the Polish People's Republic ruled that a unit of the NSZ under the leadership of Mieczysław Pazderski committed crimes against humanity in Wierzchowiny. In 1998 and 1999, the judgment was approved by the court of the new Polish Republic without any criticism. Many historians tried to prove its inaccuracies with unofficial documents that were unreliable and mostly used as a form of disapproval of the Communist regime.

== Use in propaganda ==
The Communist regime in Poland used the Wierzchowiny massacre as propaganda, calling it an example of "the fascists' savagery" (referencing the fact that the National Armed Forces had fascist ideas) and was used as a motive for fighting with the anti-Communist rebels. The Communists greatly overexaggerated the number of people killed, starting at 396, later 280, and settling at 194.

== See also ==
- List of massacres in Poland
