= Mołożów =

- Village
- Location within Poland
- Coordinates: 50°36′20″N 23°47′42″E
- Country: Poland
- Voivodeship: Lublin
- County: Hrubieszów
- Gmina: Mircze

Mołożów [mɔˈwɔʐuf] is a village in the administrative district of Gmina Mircze, within Hrubieszów County, Lublin Voivodeship, in eastern Poland, close to the border with Ukraine.

== See also ==
- Mołożów massacre
