= Cichobórz, Lublin Voivodeship =

Cichobórz
- Village
- Location within Poland
- Coordinates: 50°42′57″N 23°58′36″E
- Country: Poland
- Voivodeship: Lublin
- County: Hrubieszów
- Gmina: Hrubieszów
- Elevation: 195 m (640 ft)
- Population: 422

Cichobórz [t͡ɕiˈxɔbuʂ] is a village in the administrative district of Gmina Hrubieszów, within Hrubieszów County, Lublin Voivodeship, in eastern Poland, close to the border with Ukraine.
