= Rzeplin, Lublin Voivodeship =

Rzeplin
- Village
- Location within Poland
- Coordinates: 50°28′4″N 23°50′56″E
- Country: Poland
- Voivodeship: Lublin
- County: Tomaszów
- Gmina: Ulhówek
- Population: 520

Rzeplin [ˈʐɛplin] is a village in the administrative district of Gmina Ulhówek, within Tomaszów County, Lublin Voivodeship, in eastern Poland, close to the border with Ukraine.
