= Terebiniec =

- Village
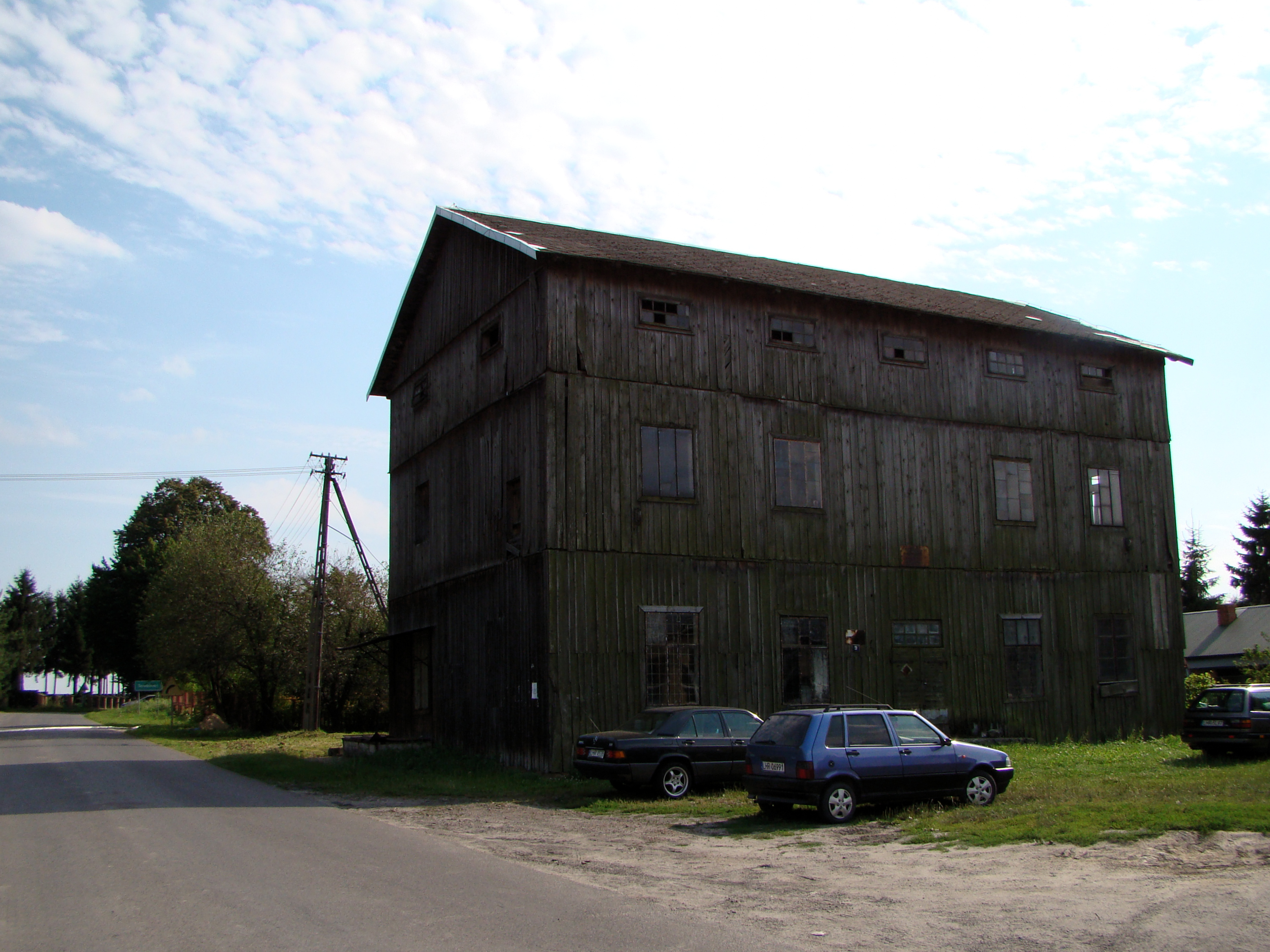

- Location within Poland
- Coordinates: 50°45′N 23°48′E
- Country: Poland
- Voivodeship: Lublin
- County: Hrubieszów
- Gmina: Werbkowice

Terebiniec [tɛrɛˈbiɲɛt͡s] is a village in the administrative district of Gmina Werbkowice, within Hrubieszów County, Lublin Voivodeship, in eastern Poland.
