= Modryń-Kolonia =

- Village
- Location within Poland
- Coordinates: 50°39′57″N 23°51′51″E
- Country: Poland
- Voivodeship: Lublin
- County: Hrubieszów
- Gmina: Mircze
- Population: 400

Modryń-Kolonia [ˈmɔdrɨɲ kɔˈlɔɲa] is a village in the administrative district of Gmina Mircze, within Hrubieszów County, Lublin Voivodeship, in eastern Poland, close to the border with Ukraine.
