= Miętkie, Lublin Voivodeship =

Miętkie
- Village
- Location within Poland
- Coordinates: 50°39′N 23°49′E
- Country: Poland
- Voivodeship: Lublin
- County: Hrubieszów
- Gmina: Mircze

Miętkie [ˈmjɛntkʲɛ] is a village in the administrative district of Gmina Mircze, within Hrubieszów County, Lublin Voivodeship, in eastern Poland, close to the border with Ukraine.

== History ==
=== World War II ===
During the World War II, in March 1944, Turkowice was attacked by Polish partisans in reprisal for the Massacres of Poles in Volhynia carried out by Ukrainian nationalists. 105 Ukrainian villagers were murdered and 160 houses destroyed.
