= Wronowice, Lublin Voivodeship =

Wronowice
- Village
- Location within Poland
- Coordinates: 50°40′58″N 23°42′56″E
- Country: Poland
- Voivodeship: Lublin
- County: Hrubieszów
- Gmina: Werbkowice

Wronowice [vrɔnɔˈvit͡sɛ] is a village in the administrative district of Gmina Werbkowice, within Hrubieszów County, Lublin Voivodeship, in eastern Poland.
