= Chrobrów =

- Village
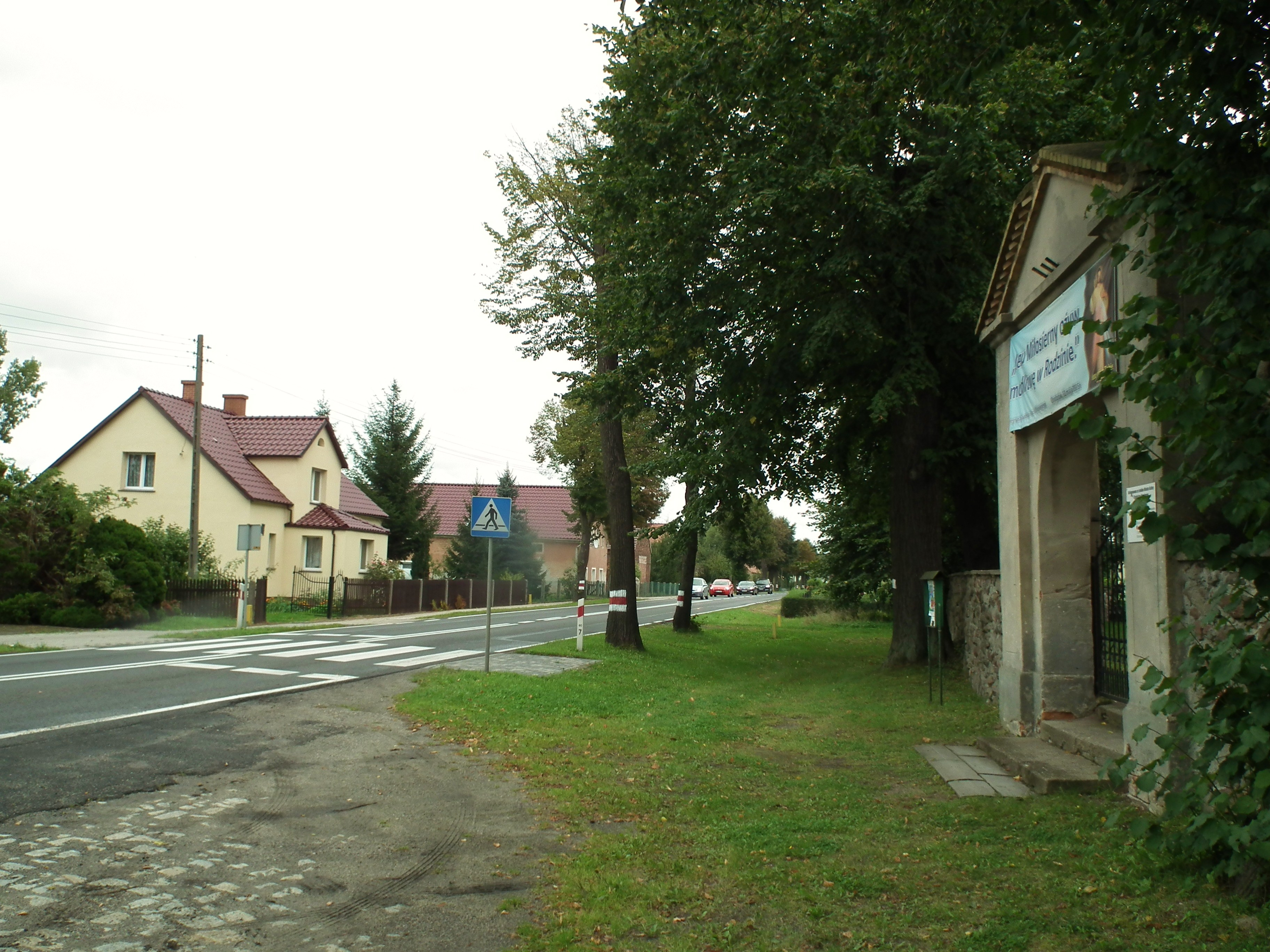

- Location within Poland
- Coordinates: 51°35′N 15°21′E
- Country: Poland
- Voivodeship: Lubusz
- County: Żagań
- Gmina: Żagań

Chrobrów [ˈxrɔbruf] is a village in the administrative district of Gmina Żagań, within Żagań County, Lubusz Voivodeship, in western Poland.

== See also ==
- Territorial changes of Poland after World War II
