= Kościaszyn =

- Village
- Location within Poland
- Coordinates: 50°31′N 23°59′E
- Country: Poland
- Voivodeship: Lublin
- County: Hrubieszów
- Gmina: Dołhobyczów
- Population: 40

Kościaszyn [kɔɕˈt͡ɕaʂɨn] is a village in the administrative district of Gmina Dołhobyczów, within Hrubieszów County, Lublin Voivodeship, in eastern Poland, close to the border with Ukraine. The village is located in the historical region Galicia.
