= Mieniany =

- Village
- Location within Poland
- Coordinates: 50°43′48″N 23°56′51″E
- Country: Poland
- Voivodeship: Lublin
- County: Hrubieszów
- Gmina: Hrubieszów
- Elevation: 200 m (660 ft)
- Population: 630

Mieniany [mjɛˈɲanɨ] is a village in the administrative district of Gmina Hrubieszów, within Hrubieszów County, Lublin Voivodeship, in eastern Poland, close to the border with Ukraine.
