= Sielec, Lublin Voivodeship =

Sielec
- Village
- Location within Poland
- Coordinates: 51°2′N 23°31′E
- Country: Poland
- Voivodeship: Lublin
- County: Chełm
- Gmina: Leśniowice

Population
  - Total: 660

Sielec [ˈɕɛlɛt͡s] is a village in the administrative district of Gmina Leśniowice, within Chełm County, Lublin Voivodeship, in eastern Poland.
