= Szychowice =

- Village
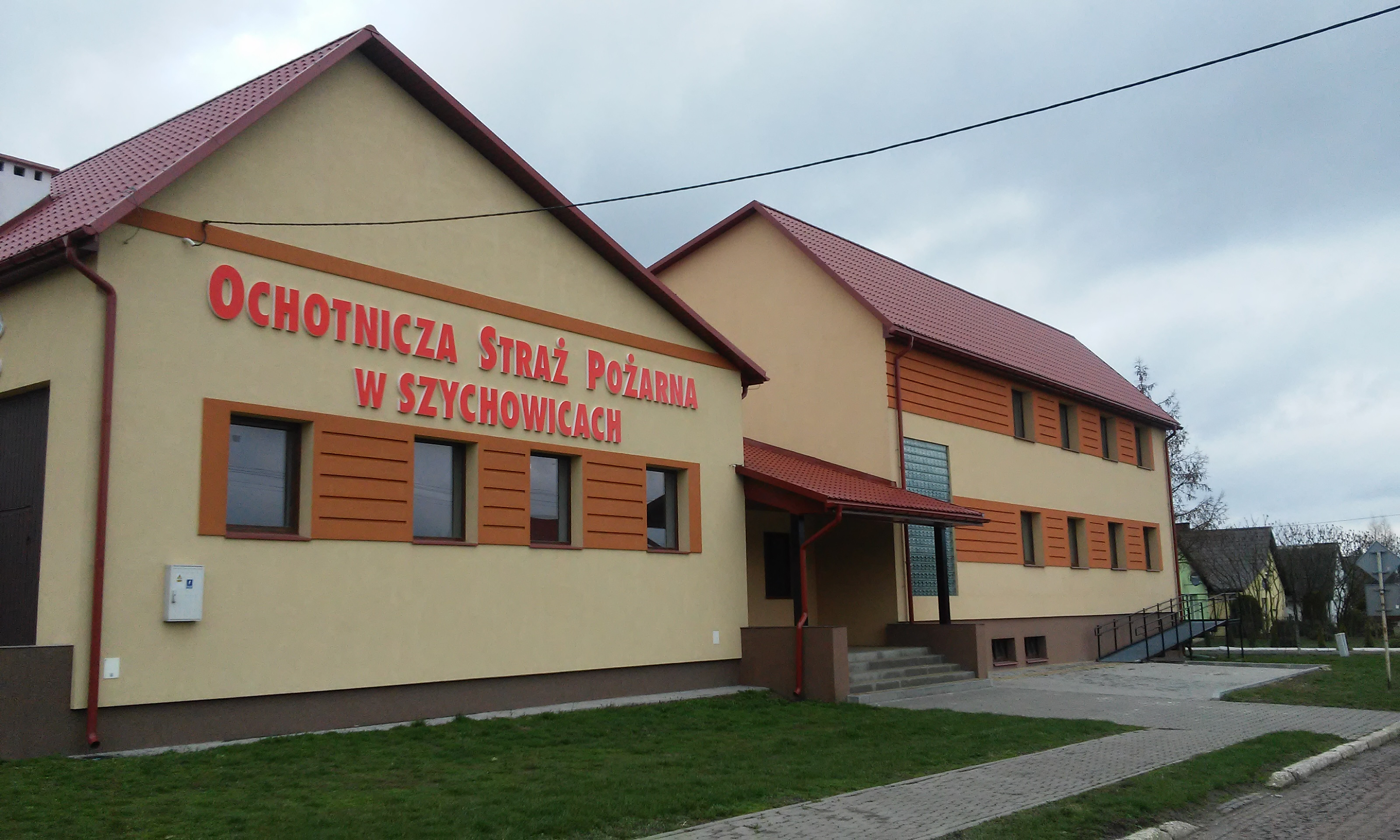
- Volunteer Fire department

- Location within Poland
- Coordinates: 50°41′N 23°59′E
- Country: Poland
- Voivodeship: Lublin
- County: Hrubieszów
- Gmina: Mircze

Szychowice [ʂɨxɔˈvit͡sɛ] is a village in the administrative district of Gmina Mircze, within Hrubieszów County, Lublin Voivodeship, in eastern Poland, close to the border with Ukraine.

== History ==
=== World War II ===
In March 1944, the Ukrainian population of Szychowice was attacked by Polish partisans in retaliation for Massacres of Poles in Volhynia. Eight villagers were murdered and 150 houses destroyed.
