= Sutki =

- Internal part of Przeorsk
- Location within Poland
- Coordinates: 50°25′07″N 23°30′23″E
- Country: Poland
- Voivodeship: Lublin
- County: Tomaszów
- Gmina: Tomaszów Lubelski

Sutki [ˈsutki] is an internal part of the Przeorsk village in the administrative district of Gmina Tomaszów Lubelski, within Tomaszów County, Lublin Voivodeship, in eastern Poland.
