= Pardasówka =

- part of village
- Location within Poland
- Coordinates: 50°28′16″N 23°25′27″E
- Country: Poland
- Voivodeship: Lublin
- County: Tomaszów
- Gmina: Tomaszów Lubelski

Pardasówka [pardaˈsufka] is part of Sabaudia village in the administrative district of Gmina Tomaszów Lubelski, within Tomaszów County, Lublin Voivodeship, in eastern Poland.
