= Niemirówka =

Niemirówka may refer to:

== Places ==
=== Moldova ===
- Nimereuca, a village and commune in Moldova known as Niemirówka in Polish.

=== Poland ===
- Niemirówka, Poland, a rural hamlet in Lubelskie Voivodeship.

Because of Polish morphology, certain declensions of the Polish villages of Niemirówek and Niemirówek-Kolonia, which are also located in Lubelskie Voivodeship, are written as Niemirówka.

=== Ukraine ===
Niemirówka is also the Polish form of Немирівка (Nemyrivka), the name of three villages in the historical region of Volhynia in Ukraine. These settlements were formerly part of the Polish-Lithuanian Commonwealth and within the Pale of Settlement:

- Nemyrivka, Rivne Oblast
- Nemyrivka, Zhytomir Oblast
- Nemyrivka, Khmelnytsky Oblast

=== Russia ===
Niemirówka is also the Polish form of Немирoвка (Nemirovka), the name of a village in the Kormilovsky District of Siberia. Many Poles and Ukrainians were forcibly settled in this area during the Russian Empire and the USSR. Siberian Ukrainians (Russian: Сибирские Украинцы, "Sibirskye Ukraintsy"), (Ukrainian: Сибірські Українці,"Sybirsʹki Ukrayintsy") form a national minority in Siberia and the Russian Far East, but make up the majority in some of the region's cities.
