= Majdan Górny =

- Village
- Location within Poland
- Coordinates: 50°28′N 23°29′E
- Country: Poland
- Voivodeship: Lublin
- County: Tomaszów
- Gmina: Tomaszów Lubelski
- Elevation: 300 m (980 ft)
- Population: 1,300

Majdan Górny (Polish pronunciation: [ˈmajdaŋ ˈɡurnɨ]) is a village in the administrative district of Gmina Tomaszów Lubelski, within Tomaszów County, Lublin Voivodeship, in eastern Poland.
