= Werechanie-Kolonia =

- Settlement
- Location within Poland
- Coordinates: 50°31′59″N 23°31′07″E
- Country: Poland
- Voivodeship: Lublin
- County: Tomaszów
- Gmina: Rachanie

Werechanie-Kolonia [vɛrɛˈxaɲɛ kɔˈlɔɲa] is a settlement in the administrative district of Gmina Rachanie, within Tomaszów County, Lublin Voivodeship, in eastern Poland.
