= Huta Dzierążyńska =

- Village
- Location within Poland
- Coordinates: 50°34′N 23°25′E
- Country: Poland
- Voivodeship: Lublin
- County: Tomaszów
- Gmina: Krynice

Huta Dzierążyńska [ˈxuta d͡ʑɛrɔ̃ˈʐɨɲska] is a village in the administrative district of Gmina Krynice, within Tomaszów County, Lublin Voivodeship, in eastern Poland.
