= Klimowice =

- Village
- Location within Poland
- Coordinates: 50°25′38″N 23°29′55″E
- Country: Poland
- Voivodeship: Lublin
- County: Tomaszów
- Gmina: Tomaszów Lubelski

Klimowice [klimɔˈvit͡sɛ] is a village in the administrative district of Gmina Tomaszów Lubelski, within Tomaszów County, Lublin Voivodeship, of south-eastern Poland. The village is located just under 25 km (16 mi) (15.53 miles) of the Polish-Ukrainian border.
