= Cybulówka =

- Village
- Location within Poland
- Coordinates: 50°24′35.06″N 23°26′54.60″E
- Country: Poland
- Voivodeship: Lublin
- County: Tomaszów
- Gmina: Tomaszów Lubelski

Cybulówka [t͡sɨbuˈlufka] is a village in the administrative district of Gmina Tomaszów Lubelski, within Tomaszów County, Lublin Voivodeship, in eastern Poland.
