= Polesie, Gmina Tomaszów Lubelski =

Polesie
- Village
- Location within Poland
- Coordinates: 50°27′06″N 23°29′35″E
- Country: Poland
- Voivodeship: Lublin
- County: Tomaszów
- Gmina: Tomaszów Lubelski

Polesie [pɔˈlɛɕɛ] is a village in the administrative district of Gmina Tomaszów Lubelski, within Tomaszów County, Lublin Voivodeship, in eastern Poland.
