= Jarczów-Kolonia Druga =

- Village
- Location within Poland
- Coordinates: 50°24′40″N 23°33′41″E
- Country: Poland
- Voivodeship: Lublin
- County: Tomaszów
- Gmina: Jarczów

Jarczów-Kolonia Druga [ˈjart͡ʂuf kɔˈlɔɲa ˈdruɡa] is a village in the administrative district of Gmina Jarczów, within Tomaszów County, Lublin Voivodeship, in eastern Poland.
