= Korhynie =

- Village
- Location within Poland
- Coordinates: 50°25′N 23°32′E
- Country: Poland
- Voivodeship: Lublin
- County: Tomaszów
- Gmina: Jarczów

Korhynie [kɔrˈxɨɲɛ] is a village in the administrative district of Gmina Jarczów, within Tomaszów County, Lublin Voivodeship, in eastern Poland.
