= Gmina Tomaszów Lubelski =

Gmina Tomaszów Lubelski Tomaszów Lubelski Commune
- Gmina
- Interactive map of Gmina Tomaszów Lubelski
- Coordinates (Tomaszów Lubelski): 50°27′N 23°25′E
- Country: Poland
- Voivodeship: Lublin
- County: Tomaszów
- Seat: Tomaszów Lubelski

Area
  - Total: 170.78 km^{2} (65.94 sq mi)

Population (2013)
  - Total: 11,285
  - Density: 66.079/km^{2} (171.14/sq mi)
- Website: www.tomaszowlubelski.pl

Gmina Tomaszów Lubelski is a rural gmina (administrative district) in Tomaszów County, Lublin Voivodeship, in eastern Poland. Its seat is the town of Tomaszów Lubelski, although the town is not part of the territory of the gmina.

The gmina covers an area of 170.78 square kilometres (65.9 sq mi), and as of 2006 its total population is 10,886 (11,285 in 2013).

The gmina contains part of the protected area called Krasnobród Landscape Park.

== Villages ==
Gmina Tomaszów Lubelski contains the villages and settlements of Bujsce, Bukowina, Chorążanka, Cieplachy, Cybulówka, Dąbrowa, Długie, Dobrzanówka, Dolina, Dub, Folwarczysko, Glinianki, Górno, Irenówka, Jeziernia, Justynówka, Kapisówka, Kątek, Klekacz, Klimowice, Łaszczówka, Łaszczówka-Kolonia, Ławki, Lipka, Majdan Górny, Majdanek, Maziarnia, Nowa Wieś, Nowy Przeorsk, Parama, Pardasówka, Pasieki, Podbełżec, Podbór, Podhorce, Polesie, Przecinka, Przeorsk, Rabinówka, Rogowe Kopce, Rogóźno, Rogóźno-Kolonia, Ruda Wołoska, Ruda Żelazna, Sabaudia, Siwa Dolina, Sołokija, Sutki, Sybir, Szarowola, Szkoci Dół, Sznury, Typin, Ulów, Wieprzowe Jezioro, Wygon and Zamiany.

== Neighbouring gminas ==
Gmina Tomaszów Lubelski is bordered by the town of Tomaszów Lubelski and by the gminas of Bełżec, Jarczów, Krasnobród, Lubycza Królewska, Narol, Rachanie, Susiec and Tarnawatka.
