= Justynówka, Lublin Voivodeship =

Justynówka
- Village
- Location within Poland
- Coordinates: 50°29′5″N 23°29′13″E
- Country: Poland
- Voivodeship: Lublin
- County: Tomaszów
- Gmina: Tomaszów Lubelski
- Population: 230

Justynówka [justɨˈnufka] is a village in the administrative district of Gmina Tomaszów Lubelski, within Tomaszów County, Lublin Voivodeship, in eastern Poland.
