= Zwiartówek-Kolonia =

- Village
- Location within Poland
- Coordinates: 50°33′35″N 23°32′27″E
- Country: Poland
- Voivodeship: Lublin
- County: Tomaszów
- Gmina: Rachanie

Zwiartówek-Kolonia [zvjarˈtuvɛk kɔˈlɔɲa] is a village in the administrative district of Gmina Rachanie, within Tomaszów County, Lublin Voivodeship, in eastern Poland.
