= Siwa Dolina =

- Settlement
- Location within Poland
- Coordinates: 50°26′42″N 23°24′33″E
- Country: Poland
- Voivodeship: Lublin
- County: Tomaszów
- Gmina: Tomaszów Lubelski

Siwa Dolina [ˈɕiva dɔˈlina] is a settlement in the administrative district of Gmina Tomaszów Lubelski, within Tomaszów County, Lublin Voivodeship, in eastern Poland.
