= Górno =

Górno may refer to the following places:

- Górno, Lublin Voivodeship (east Poland)
- Górno, Subcarpathian Voivodeship (south-east Poland)
- Górno, Świętokrzyskie Voivodeship (south-central Poland)
