= Dąbrowa, Gmina Tomaszów Lubelski =

Dąbrowa
- Village
- Location within Poland
- Coordinates: 50°28′35″N 23°24′58″E
- Country: Poland
- Voivodeship: Lublin
- County: Tomaszów
- Gmina: Tomaszów Lubelski

Dąbrowa [dɔmˈbrɔva] is a village in the administrative district of Gmina Tomaszów Lubelski, within Tomaszów County, Lublin Voivodeship, in eastern Poland.
