= Wola Gródecka =

- Village
- Location within Poland
- Coordinates: 50°29′03″N 23°37′40″E
- Country: Poland
- Voivodeship: Lublin
- County: Tomaszów
- Gmina: Jarczów

Wola Gródecka [ˈvɔla ɡruˈdɛt͡ska] is a village in the administrative district of Gmina Jarczów, within Tomaszów County, Lublin Voivodeship, in eastern Poland.
