= Rogowe Kopce =

- Village
- Location within Poland
- Coordinates: 50°24′37″N 23°22′09″E
- Country: Poland
- Voivodeship: Lublin
- County: Tomaszów
- Gmina: Tomaszów Lubelski

Rogowe Kopce [rɔˈɡɔvɛ ˈkɔpt͡sɛ] is a village in the administrative district of Gmina Tomaszów Lubelski, within Tomaszów County, Lublin Voivodeship, in eastern Poland.
