= Pauczne =

- Village
- Location within Poland
- Coordinates: 50°32′30″N 23°25′53″E
- Country: Poland
- Voivodeship: Lublin
- County: Tomaszów
- Gmina: Tarnawatka

Pauczne [ˈpau̯t͡ʂnɛ] is a village in the administrative district of Gmina Tarnawatka, within Tomaszów County, Lublin Voivodeship, in eastern Poland.
