= Romanówka, Gmina Krynice =

Romanówka
- Village
- Location within Poland
- Coordinates: 50°34′54″N 23°20′16″E
- Country: Poland
- Voivodeship: Lublin
- County: Tomaszów
- Gmina: Krynice
- Time zone: UTC+1 (CET)
  - Summer (DST): UTC+2 (CEST)

Romanówka [rɔmaˈnufka] is a village in the administrative district of Gmina Krynice, within Tomaszów County, Lublin Voivodeship, in eastern Poland.

== History ==
Three Polish citizens were murdered by Nazi Germany in the village during World War II.
