= Trzeciaki, Lublin Voivodeship =

Trzeciaki
- Village
- Location within Poland
- Coordinates: 50°38′12″N 23°38′24″E
- Country: Poland
- Voivodeship: Lublin
- County: Tomaszów
- Gmina: Tyszowce

Trzeciaki [tʂɛˈt͡ɕaki] is a village in the administrative district of Gmina Tyszowce, within Tomaszów County, Lublin Voivodeship, in eastern Poland.
