= Pasieki, Lublin Voivodeship =

Pasieki
- Village
- Location within Poland
- Coordinates: 50°26′N 23°21′E
- Country: Poland
- Voivodeship: Lublin
- County: Tomaszów
- Gmina: Tomaszów Lubelski
- Website: http://sppasieki.ovh.org

Pasieki [paˈɕɛki] is a village in the administrative district of Gmina Tomaszów Lubelski, within Tomaszów County, Lublin Voivodeship, in eastern Poland.
