= Nedeżów =

- Village
- Location within Poland
- Coordinates: 50°28′N 23°35′E
- Country: Poland
- Voivodeship: Lublin
- County: Tomaszów
- Gmina: Jarczów

Nedeżów [nɛˈdɛʐuf] is a village in the administrative district of Gmina Jarczów, within Tomaszów County, Lublin Voivodeship, in eastern Poland.
