= Huta Tarnawacka =

- Village
- Location within Poland
- Coordinates: 50°31′51″N 23°26′58″E
- Country: Poland
- Voivodeship: Lublin
- County: Tomaszów
- Gmina: Tarnawatka
- Time zone: UTC+1 (CET)
  - Summer (DST): UTC+2 (CEST)

Huta Tarnawacka [ˈxuta tarnaˈvat͡ska] is a village in the administrative district of Gmina Tarnawatka, within Tomaszów County, Lublin Voivodeship, in eastern Poland.

== History ==
Eight Polish citizens were murdered by Nazi Germany in the village during World War II.
