= Wieprzów Ordynacki =

- Village
- Location within Poland
- Coordinates: 50°29′29″N 23°26′42″E
- Country: Poland
- Voivodeship: Lublin
- County: Tomaszów
- Gmina: Tarnawatka
- Website: http://www.wieprzow.prv.pl

Wieprzów Ordynacki [ˈvjɛpʂuf ɔrdɨˈnat͡ski] is a village in the administrative district of Gmina Tarnawatka, within Tomaszów County, Lublin Voivodeship, in eastern Poland.
