= Przecinka, Lublin Voivodeship =

Przecinka
- Village
- Location within Poland
- Coordinates: 50°29′36″N 23°29′48″E
- Country: Poland
- Voivodeship: Lublin
- County: Tomaszów
- Gmina: Tomaszów Lubelski

Przecinka [pʂɛˈt͡ɕiŋka] is a village in the administrative district of Gmina Tomaszów Lubelski, within Tomaszów County, Lublin Voivodeship, in eastern Poland.
