= Zaboreczno =

- Village
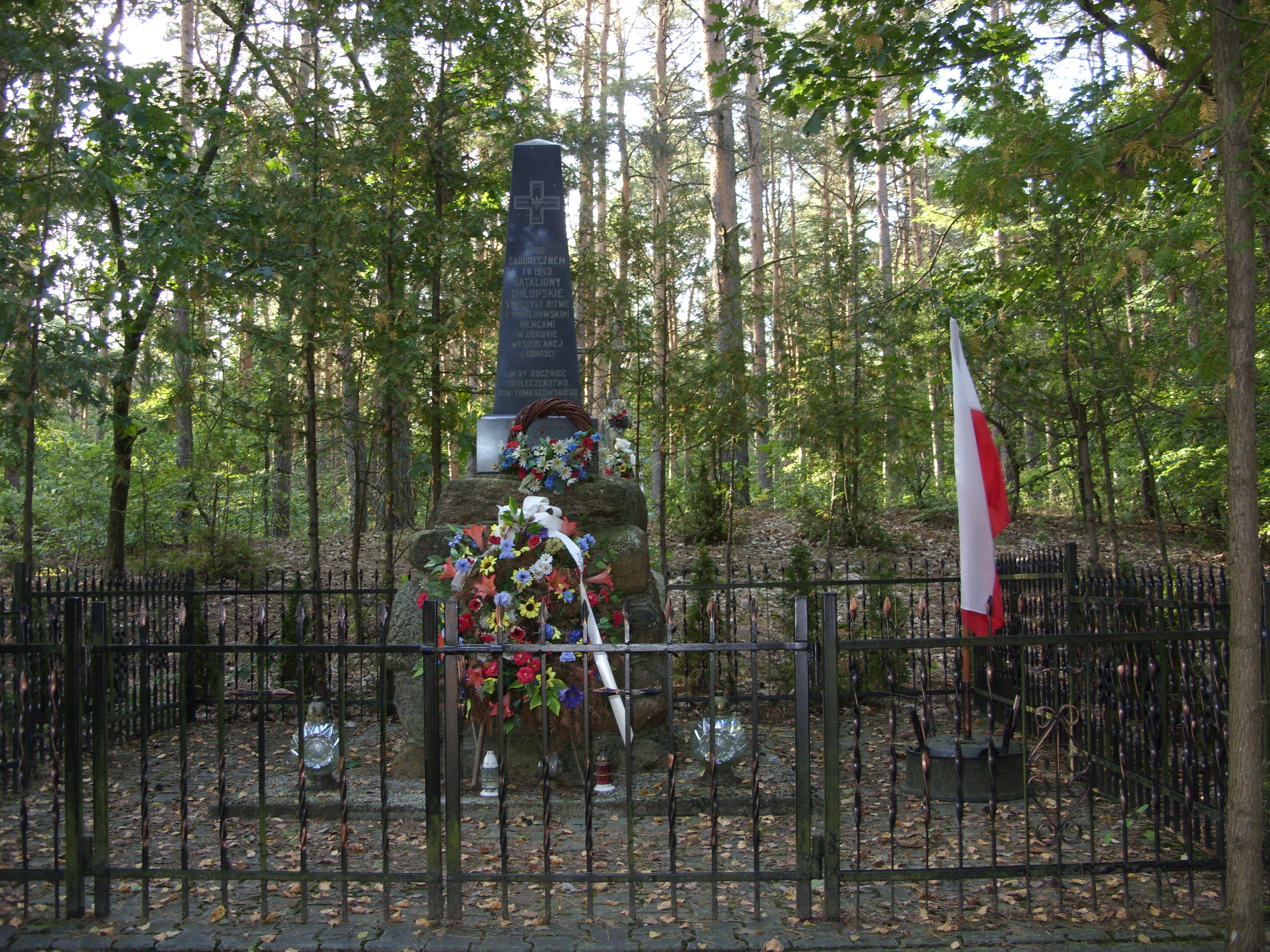
- Monument to the Battle of Zaboreczno between Polish partisans and German occupiers

- Location within Poland
- Coordinates: 50°34′N 23°20′E
- Country: Poland
- Voivodeship: Lublin
- County: Tomaszów
- Gmina: Krynice
- Time zone: UTC+1 (CET)
  - Summer (DST): UTC+2 (CEST)

Zaboreczno [zabɔˈrɛt͡ʂnɔ] is a village in the administrative district of Gmina Krynice, within Tomaszów County, Lublin Voivodeship, in eastern Poland.

During World War II, the village was occupied by Germany. On 1 February 1943, it was the site of battle between Polish partisans of the Peasant Battalions and the German occupiers, won by the Poles. The Polish victory brought the expulsion of Poles from the region to a halt.
