= Kolonia Klocówka =

- Settlement
- Location within Poland
- Coordinates: 50°32′59″N 23°19′26″E
- Country: Poland
- Voivodeship: Lublin
- County: Tomaszów
- Gmina: Tarnawatka

Kolonia Klocówka [kɔˈlɔɲa klɔˈt͡sufka] is a settlement in the administrative district of Gmina Tarnawatka, within Tomaszów County, Lublin Voivodeship, in eastern Poland.
