= Kazimierówka, Gmina Tyszowce =

Kazimierówka
- Village
- Location within Poland
- Coordinates: 50°41′N 23°39′E
- Country: Poland
- Voivodeship: Lublin
- County: Tomaszów
- Gmina: Tyszowce

Kazimierówka [kaʑimjɛˈrufka] is a village in the administrative district of Gmina Tyszowce, within Tomaszów County, Lublin Voivodeship, in eastern Poland.
