= Kolonia, Gmina Tyszowce =

Kolonia
- Settlement
- Location within Poland
- Coordinates: 50°36′1″N 23°39′42″E
- Country: Poland
- Voivodeship: Lublin
- County: Tomaszów
- Gmina: Tyszowce

Kolonia [kɔˈlɔɲa] is a settlement in the administrative district of Gmina Tyszowce, within Tomaszów County, Lublin Voivodeship, in eastern Poland.
