= Nowinki, Gmina Tyszowce =

Nowinki
- Settlement
- Location within Poland
- Coordinates: 50°39′2″N 23°41′37″E
- Country: Poland
- Voivodeship: Lublin
- County: Tomaszów
- Gmina: Tyszowce

Nowinki [nɔˈviŋki] is a settlement in the administrative district of Gmina Tyszowce, within Tomaszów County, Lublin Voivodeship, in eastern Poland.
