= Nowa Wieś, Gmina Tomaszów Lubelski =

Nowa Wieś
- Village
- Location within Poland
- Coordinates: 50°28′N 23°32′E
- Country: Poland
- Voivodeship: Lublin
- County: Tomaszów
- Gmina: Tomaszów Lubelski

Nowa Wieś [ˈnɔva ˈvjɛɕ] is a village in the administrative district of Gmina Tomaszów Lubelski, within Tomaszów County, Lublin Voivodeship, in eastern Poland.
