= Rogóźno-Kolonia =

- Village
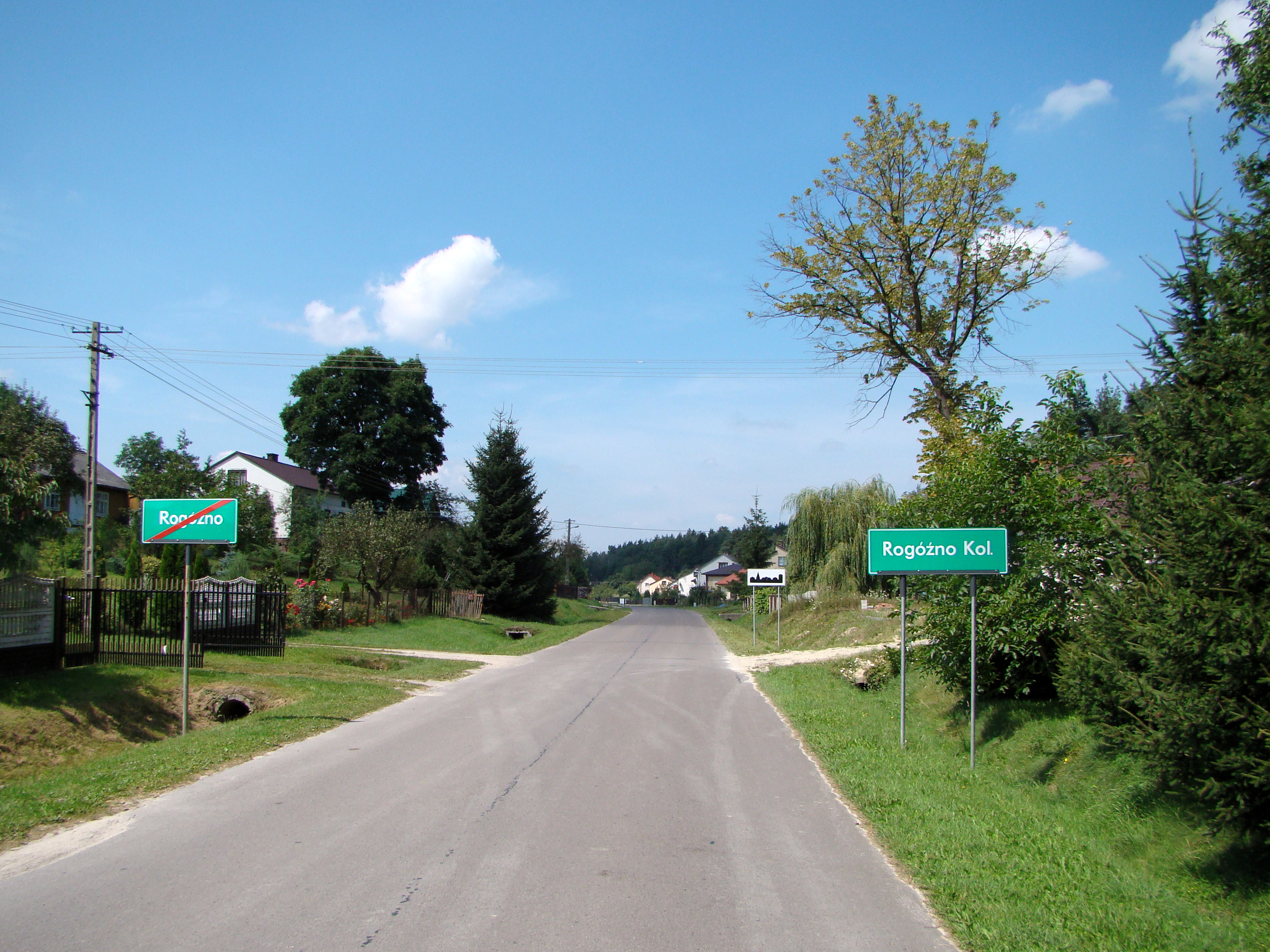

- Location within Poland
- Coordinates: 50°28′03″N 23°21′36″E
- Country: Poland
- Voivodeship: Lublin
- County: Tomaszów
- Gmina: Tomaszów Lubelski

Rogóźno-Kolonia [rɔˈɡuʑnɔ kɔˈlɔɲa] is a village in the administrative district of Gmina Tomaszów Lubelski, within Tomaszów County, Lublin Voivodeship, in eastern Poland.
