= Kolonia Mikulin =

- Settlement
- Location within Poland
- Coordinates: 50°35′28″N 23°43′21″E
- Country: Poland
- Voivodeship: Lublin
- County: Tomaszów
- Gmina: Tyszowce

Kolonia Mikulin [kɔˈlɔɲa miˈkulin] is a settlement in the administrative district of Gmina Tyszowce, within Tomaszów County, Lublin Voivodeship, in eastern Poland.
