= Kociuba =

- Settlement
- Location within Poland
- Coordinates: 50°31′06″N 23°32′00″E
- Country: Poland
- Voivodeship: Lublin
- County: Tomaszów
- Gmina: Rachanie

Kociuba [kɔˈt͡ɕuba] is a settlement in the administrative district of Gmina Rachanie, within Tomaszów County, Lublin Voivodeship, in eastern Poland.
