= Budy Dzierążyńskie =

- Village
- Location within Poland
- Coordinates: 50°34′09.75″N 23°23′44.59″E
- Country: Poland
- Voivodeship: Lublin
- County: Tomaszów
- Gmina: Krynice

Budy Dzierążyńskie [ˈbudɨ d͡ʑɛrɔ̃ˈʐɨɲskʲɛ] is a village in the administrative district of Gmina Krynice, within Tomaszów County, Lublin Voivodeship, in eastern Poland.
