= Majdan Sielec =

- Village
- Location within Poland
- Coordinates: 50°36′N 23°27′E
- Country: Poland
- Voivodeship: Lublin
- County: Tomaszów
- Gmina: Krynice

Majdan Sielec (Polish pronunciation: [ˈmajdan ˈɕɛlɛts]) is a village in the administrative district of Gmina Krynice, within Tomaszów County, Lublin Voivodeship, in eastern Poland.
