= Czartowczyk =

- Village
- Location within Poland
- Coordinates: 50°35′N 23°36′E
- Country: Poland
- Voivodeship: Lublin
- County: Tomaszów
- Gmina: Tyszowce

Czartowczyk [t͡ʂarˈtɔft͡ʂɨk] is a village in the administrative district of Gmina Tyszowce, within Tomaszów County, Lublin Voivodeship, in eastern Poland.
