= Rudka, Gmina Tyszowce =

Rudka
- Village
- Location within Poland
- Coordinates: 50°40′N 23°36′E
- Country: Poland
- Voivodeship: Lublin
- County: Tomaszów
- Gmina: Tyszowce

Rudka [ˈrutka] is a village in the administrative district of Gmina Tyszowce, within Tomaszów County, Lublin Voivodeship, in eastern Poland.
