= Podbór, Gmina Tomaszów Lubelski =

Podbór
- Village
- Location within Poland
- Coordinates: 50°24′33″N 23°25′20″E
- Country: Poland
- Voivodeship: Lublin
- County: Tomaszów
- Gmina: Tomaszów Lubelski

Podbór [ˈpɔdbur] is a village in the administrative district of Gmina Tomaszów Lubelski, within Tomaszów County, Lublin Voivodeship, in eastern Poland.
