= Otton Mieczysław Żukowski =

Polish composer

Otton Mieczysław Żukowski (Bełz on the Sołokija, 8 March 1867 – 31 March 1942) was a Polish composer. He also worked as a publisher of music for male and mixed choirs.
