= Petrynówka =

- Settlement
- Location within Poland
- Coordinates: 50°32′52″N 23°24′46″E
- Country: Poland
- Voivodeship: Lublin
- County: Tomaszów
- Gmina: Tarnawatka

Petrynówka [pɛtrɨˈnufka] is a settlement in the administrative district of Gmina Tarnawatka, within Tomaszów County, Lublin Voivodeship, in eastern Poland.
