= Sumin, Gmina Tarnawatka =

Sumin
- Village
- Location within Poland
- Coordinates: 50°33′5″N 23°24′4″E
- Country: Poland
- Voivodeship: Lublin
- County: Tomaszów
- Gmina: Tarnawatka
- Population: 222

Sumin [ˈsumin] is a village in the administrative district of Gmina Tarnawatka, within Tomaszów County, Lublin Voivodeship, in eastern Poland.
