= Maziarnia =

Maziarnia may refer to the following places:

- Maziarnia, Chełm County in Lublin Voivodeship (east Poland)
- Maziarnia, Gmina Tomaszów Lubelski, Tomaszów County in Lublin Voivodeship (east Poland)
- Maziarnia, Nisko County in Subcarpathian Voivodeship (south-east Poland)
- Maziarnia, Stalowa Wola County in Subcarpathian Voivodeship (south-east Poland)
