= Pańków =

- Village
- Location within Poland
- Coordinates: 50°31′N 23°21′E
- Country: Poland
- Voivodeship: Lublin
- County: Tomaszów
- Gmina: Tarnawatka

Pańków (Polish: [ˈpaj̃kuf]) is a village in the administrative district of Gmina Tarnawatka, within Tomaszów County, Lublin Voivodeship, in eastern Poland.
