= Lipka, Lublin Voivodeship =

Lipka
- Village
- Location within Poland
- Coordinates: 50°27′20″N 23°27′30″E
- Country: Poland
- Voivodeship: Lublin
- County: Tomaszów
- Gmina: Tomaszów Lubelski

Lipka [ˈlipka] is a village in the administrative district of Gmina Tomaszów Lubelski, within Tomaszów County, Lublin Voivodeship, in eastern Poland.
