= Plebanka, Lublin Voivodeship =

Plebanka
- Village
- Location within Poland
- Coordinates: 50°25′N 23°40′E
- Country: Poland
- Voivodeship: Lublin
- County: Tomaszów
- Gmina: Jarczów
- Time zone: UTC+1 (CET)
  - Summer (DST): UTC+2 (CEST)
- Vehicle registration: LTM

Plebanka [plɛˈbaŋka] is a village in the administrative district of Gmina Jarczów, within Tomaszów County, Lublin Voivodeship, in eastern Poland.

== History ==
According to the 1921 census, the village had a population of 62, solely Polish by nationality.

Following the German-Soviet invasion of Poland, which started World War II in September 1939, the village was occupied by Germany until 1944. On 14 April 1944, the Ukrainian Insurgent Army committed a massacre of 57 Poles, men, women and children.
