= Szkoci Dół =

- Settlement
- Location within Poland
- Coordinates: 50°26′02″N 23°24′53″E
- Country: Poland
- Voivodeship: Lublin
- County: Tomaszów
- Gmina: Tomaszów Lubelski

Szkoci Dół (Polish pronunciation: [ˈʂkɔtɕi ˈduw]) is a settlement in the administrative district of Gmina Tomaszów Lubelski, within Tomaszów County, Lublin Voivodeship, in eastern Poland.
