= Pierwszaki =

- Village
- Location within Poland
- Coordinates: 50°38′10″N 23°36′57″E
- Country: Poland
- Voivodeship: Lublin
- County: Tomaszów
- Gmina: Tyszowce

Pierwszaki [pjɛrfˈʂaki] is a village in the administrative district of Gmina Tyszowce, within Tomaszów County, Lublin Voivodeship, in eastern Poland.
