= Ulów =

Ulów may refer to the following places:

- Ulów, Lublin Voivodeship (east Poland)
- Ulów, Masovian Voivodeship (east-central Poland)
- Ulów, Świętokrzyskie Voivodeship (south-central Poland)
