= Tarnawatka-Tartak =

- Village
- Location within Poland
- Coordinates: 50°30′59″N 23°24′18″E
- Country: Poland
- Voivodeship: Lublin
- County: Tomaszów
- Gmina: Tarnawatka

Tarnawatka-Tartak [tarnaˈvatka ˈtartak] is a village in the administrative district of Gmina Tarnawatka, within Tomaszów County, Lublin Voivodeship, in eastern Poland.
