= Dąbrowa, Gmina Krynice =

Dąbrowa
- Village
- Location within Poland
- Coordinates: 50°35′07″N 23°24′35″E
- Country: Poland
- Voivodeship: Lublin
- County: Tomaszów
- Gmina: Krynice

Dąbrowa [dɔmˈbrɔva] is a village in the administrative district of Gmina Krynice, within Tomaszów County, Lublin Voivodeship, in eastern Poland.
