= Ławki, Gmina Tomaszów Lubelski =

Ławki
- Settlement
- Location within Poland
- Coordinates: 50°27′26″N 23°24′37″E
- Country: Poland
- Voivodeship: Lublin
- County: Tomaszów
- Gmina: Tomaszów Lubelski

Ławki [ˈwafki] is a settlement in the administrative district of Gmina Tomaszów Lubelski, within Tomaszów County, Lublin Voivodeship, in eastern Poland.
