= Parama =

- Village
- Location within Poland
- Coordinates: 50°30′19″N 23°35′20″E
- Country: Poland
- Voivodeship: Lublin
- County: Tomaszów
- Gmina: Tomaszów Lubelski

Parama [paˈrama] is a village in the administrative district of Gmina Tomaszów Lubelski, within Tomaszów County, Lublin Voivodeship, in eastern Poland.
