= Soból, Lublin Voivodeship =

Soból
- Village
- Location within Poland
- Coordinates: 50°35′N 23°38′E
- Country: Poland
- Voivodeship: Lublin
- County: Tomaszów
- Gmina: Tyszowce

Soból [ˈsɔbul] is a village in the administrative district of Gmina Tyszowce, within Tomaszów County, Lublin Voivodeship, in eastern Poland.
