= Sybir, Lublin Voivodeship =

Sybir
- Village
- Location within Poland
- Coordinates: 50°26′43″N 23°19′54″E
- Country: Poland
- Voivodeship: Lublin
- County: Tomaszów
- Gmina: Tomaszów Lubelski

Sybir [ˈsɨbir] is a village in the administrative district of Gmina Tomaszów Lubelski, within Tomaszów County, Lublin Voivodeship, in eastern Poland.
