= Bukowina, Gmina Tomaszów Lubelski =

Bukowina
- Village
- Location within Poland
- Coordinates: 50°30′09″N 23°35′57″E
- Country: Poland
- Voivodeship: Lublin
- County: Tomaszów
- Gmina: Tomaszów Lubelski

Bukowina [bukɔˈvina] is a village in the administrative district of Gmina Tomaszów Lubelski, within Tomaszów County, Lublin Voivodeship, in eastern Poland.
