= Kaliwy =

- Village
- Location within Poland
- Coordinates: 50°36′15″N 23°39′22″E
- Country: Poland
- Voivodeship: Lublin
- County: Tomaszów
- Gmina: Tyszowce

Kaliwy [kaˈlivɨ] is a village in the administrative district of Gmina Tyszowce, within Tomaszów County, Lublin Voivodeship, in eastern Poland.
