= Perespa-Kolonia =

- Village
- Location within Poland
- Coordinates: 50°40′7″N 23°38′16″E
- Country: Poland
- Voivodeship: Lublin
- County: Tomaszów
- Gmina: Tyszowce
- Population: 200

Perespa-Kolonia [pɛˈrɛspa kɔˈlɔɲa] is a village in the administrative district of Gmina Tyszowce, within Tomaszów County, Lublin Voivodeship, in eastern Poland.
