= Michalów, Gmina Rachanie =

Michalów
- Village
- Location within Poland
- Coordinates: 50°32′48″N 23°36′18″E
- Country: Poland
- Voivodeship: Lublin
- County: Tomaszów
- Gmina: Rachanie

Michalów [miˈxaluf] is a village in the administrative district of Gmina Rachanie, within Tomaszów County, Lublin Voivodeship, in eastern Poland.
