= Dolina, Lublin Voivodeship =

Dolina
- Village
- Location within Poland
- Coordinates: 50°29′05″N 23°29′49″E
- Country: Poland
- Voivodeship: Lublin
- County: Tomaszów
- Gmina: Tomaszów Lubelski

Dolina [dɔˈlina] is a village in the administrative district of Gmina Tomaszów Lubelski, within Tomaszów County, Lublin Voivodeship, in eastern Poland.
