= Podhucie =

- Village
- Location within Poland
- Coordinates: 50°31′02″N 23°28′13″E
- Country: Poland
- Voivodeship: Lublin
- County: Tomaszów
- Gmina: Tarnawatka
- Time zone: UTC+1 (CET)
  - Summer (DST): UTC+2 (CEST)

Podhucie [pɔtˈxut͡ɕɛ] is a village in the administrative district of Gmina Tarnawatka, within Tomaszów County, Lublin Voivodeship, in eastern Poland.

== History ==
Eight Polish citizens were murdered by Nazi Germany in the village during World War II.
