= Majdan Krynicki, Gmina Krynice =

Majdan Krynicki
- Village
- Location within Poland
- Coordinates: 50°36′15″N 23°22′46″E
- Country: Poland
- Voivodeship: Lublin
- County: Tomaszów
- Gmina: Krynice

Majdan Krynicki (Polish pronunciation: [ˈmajdaŋ krɨˈɲitskʲi]) is a village in the administrative district of Gmina Krynice, within Tomaszów County, Lublin Voivodeship, in eastern Poland.
