= Wierszczyca =

- Village
- Location within Poland
- Coordinates: 50°26′59″N 23°36′07″E
- Country: Poland
- Voivodeship: Lublin
- County: Tomaszów
- Gmina: Jarczów
- Population (approx.): 500

Wierszczyca [vjɛrʂˈt͡ʂɨt͡sa] is a village in the administrative district of Gmina Jarczów, within Tomaszów County, Lublin Voivodeship, in eastern Poland.
