= Czartowiec =

- Village
- Location within Poland
- Coordinates: 50°34′N 23°40′E
- Country: Poland
- Voivodeship: Lublin
- County: Tomaszów
- Gmina: Tyszowce
- Time zone: UTC+1 (CET)
  - Summer (DST): UTC+2 (CEST)
- Vehicle registration: LTM

Czartowiec [t͡ʂarˈtɔvjɛt͡s] is a village in the administrative district of Gmina Tyszowce, within Tomaszów County, Lublin Voivodeship, in eastern Poland.

== History ==
During World War II, the local Polish parish priest was murdered by the Russians in the Katyn massacre in 1940.
