= Letowski =

Letowski or Łętowski (feminine: Łętowska; plural: Łętowscy) is a surname. Notable people with the surname include:

- Ewa Łętowska (born 1940), Polish lawyer
- Ludwik Łętowski (1786–1868), Polish writer and clergyman
- Trevor Letowski (born 1977), Canadian ice hockey player and coach
