= Gródek-Kolonia, Lublin Voivodeship =

Gródek-Kolonia
- Village
- Location within Poland
- Coordinates: 50°28′24″N 23°38′25″E
- Country: Poland
- Voivodeship: Lublin
- County: Tomaszów
- Gmina: Jarczów

Gródek-Kolonia [ˈɡrudɛk kɔˈlɔɲa] is a village in the administrative district of Gmina Jarczów, within Tomaszów County, Lublin Voivodeship, in eastern Poland.
