= Kaliszaki =

- Village
- Location within Poland
- Coordinates: 50°33′04″N 23°20′55″E
- Country: Poland
- Voivodeship: Lublin
- County: Tomaszów
- Gmina: Tarnawatka

Kaliszaki [kaliˈʂaki] is a village in the administrative district of Gmina Tarnawatka, within Tomaszów County, Lublin Voivodeship, in eastern Poland.
