= Kunówka =

- Village
- Location within Poland
- Coordinates: 50°33′06″N 23°22′55″E
- Country: Poland
- Voivodeship: Lublin
- County: Tomaszów
- Gmina: Tarnawatka

Kunówka [kuˈnufka] is a village in the administrative district of Gmina Tarnawatka, within Tomaszów County, Lublin Voivodeship, in eastern Poland.
