= Zadnoga =

- Village
- Location within Poland
- Coordinates: 50°35′5″N 23°21′39″E
- Country: Poland
- Voivodeship: Lublin
- County: Tomaszów
- Gmina: Krynice

Zadnoga [zadˈnɔɡa] is a village in the administrative district of Gmina Krynice, within Tomaszów County, Lublin Voivodeship, in eastern Poland.
