= Dobrzanówka =

- Village
- Location within Poland
- Coordinates: 50°29′15″N 23°33′13″E
- Country: Poland
- Voivodeship: Lublin
- County: Tomaszów
- Gmina: Tomaszów Lubelski

Dobrzanówka [dɔbʐaˈnufka] is a village in the administrative district of Gmina Tomaszów Lubelski in eastern Poland. The administrative district where it is located is within Tomaszów County of Lublin Voivodeship.
