= Czartowiec-Kolonia =

- Village
- Location within Poland
- Coordinates: 50°35′06″N 23°39′36″E
- Country: Poland
- Voivodeship: Lublin
- County: Tomaszów
- Gmina: Tyszowce

Czartowiec-Kolonia [t͡ʂarˈtɔvjɛt͡s kɔˈlɔɲa] is a village in the administrative district of Gmina Tyszowce, within Tomaszów County, Lublin Voivodeship, in eastern Poland.
