= Wojciechówka, Gmina Tyszowce =

Wojciechówka
- Village
- Location within Poland
- Coordinates: 50°37′40″N 23°39′51″E
- Country: Poland
- Voivodeship: Lublin
- County: Tomaszów
- Gmina: Tyszowce

Wojciechówka (Polish pronunciation: [vɔjt͡ɕɛˈxufka]) is a village in the administrative district of Gmina Tyszowce, within Tomaszów County, Lublin Voivodeship, in eastern Poland.
