= Antoniówka, Gmina Krynice =

Antoniówka
- Village
- Location within Poland
- Coordinates: 50°34′N 23°22′E
- Country: Poland
- Voivodeship: Lublin
- County: Tomaszów
- Gmina: Krynice

Antoniówka [antɔˈɲufka] is a village in the administrative district of Gmina Krynice, within Tomaszów County, Lublin Voivodeship, in eastern Poland.
