= Dzierążnia, Lublin Voivodeship =

Dzierążnia
- Village
- Location within Poland
- Coordinates: 50°34′N 23°27′E
- Country: Poland
- Voivodeship: Lublin
- County: Tomaszów
- Gmina: Krynice
- Population: 430

Dzierążnia [d͡ʑɛˈrɔ̃ʐɲa] is a village in the administrative district of Gmina Krynice, within Tomaszów County, Lublin Voivodeship, in eastern Poland.
