= Siemierz, Lublin Voivodeship =

Siemierz
- Village
- Location within Poland
- Coordinates: 50°35′N 23°31′E
- Country: Poland
- Voivodeship: Lublin
- County: Tomaszów
- Gmina: Rachanie

Siemierz [ˈɕɛmjɛʂ] is a village in the administrative district of Gmina Rachanie, within Tomaszów County, Lublin Voivodeship, in eastern Poland.
