= Hatczyska =

- Village
- Location within Poland
- Coordinates: 50°31′57″N 23°29′19″E
- Country: Poland
- Voivodeship: Lublin
- County: Tomaszów
- Gmina: Tarnawatka

Hatczyska [xatˈt͡ʂɨska] is a village in the administrative district of Gmina Tarnawatka, within Tomaszów County, Lublin Voivodeship, in eastern Poland.
