= Podhoretz =

Podhoretz may refer to:

- John Podhoretz (born 1961), American journalist and conservative political commentator, son of Norman
- Norman Podhoretz (1930–2025), American magazine editor, writer, and conservative political commentator

== See also ==
- Podhorce (disambiguation)
