= Marysin, Gmina Tyszowce =

Marysin
- Village
- Location within Poland
- Coordinates: 50°38′09″N 23°37′03″E
- Country: Poland
- Voivodeship: Lublin
- County: Tomaszów
- Gmina: Tyszowce

Marysin [maˈrɨɕin] is a village in the administrative district of Gmina Tyszowce, within Tomaszów County, Lublin Voivodeship, in eastern Poland.
