= Jeziernia =

- Village
- Location within Poland
- Coordinates: 50°24′43″N 23°24′52″E
- Country: Poland
- Voivodeship: Lublin
- County: Tomaszów
- Gmina: Tomaszów Lubelski
- Population: 980

Jeziernia [jɛˈʑɛrɲa] is a village in the administrative district of Gmina Tomaszów Lubelski, within Tomaszów County, Lublin Voivodeship, in eastern Poland.

The village has a park with the Grotto of our Lady, and a centrally located church – St Anthony of Padua. There are also a fire station and a primary school. Jeziernia has a few local privately owned shops. Jeziernia is situated in an agricultural region of Roztocze Wschodnie.
