= Zwiartów-Kolonia =

- Village
- Location within Poland
- Coordinates: 50°33′48″N 23°28′39″E
- Country: Poland
- Voivodeship: Lublin
- County: Tomaszów
- Gmina: Krynice

Zwiartów-Kolonia [ˈzvjartuf kɔˈlɔɲa] is a village in the administrative district of Gmina Krynice, within Tomaszów County, Lublin Voivodeship, in eastern Poland.
