= Grodysławice-Kolonia =

- Village
- Location within Poland
- Coordinates: 50°31′32″N 23°37′33″E
- Country: Poland
- Voivodeship: Lublin
- County: Tomaszów
- Gmina: Rachanie

Grodysławice-Kolonia [ɡrɔdɨswaˈvit͡sɛ kɔˈlɔɲa] is a village in the administrative district of Gmina Rachanie, within Tomaszów County, Lublin Voivodeship, in eastern Poland.
