= Łaszczówka =

- Village
- Location within Poland
- Coordinates: 50°27′N 23°26′E
- Country: Poland
- Voivodeship: Lublin
- County: Tomaszów
- Gmina: Tomaszów Lubelski
- Population: 1,000

Łaszczówka [waʂˈt͡ʂufka] is a village in the administrative district of Gmina Tomaszów Lubelski, within Tomaszów County, Lublin Voivodeship, in eastern Poland.
