= Majdanek (disambiguation) =

Majdanek was a German Nazi concentration camp named after a park near the city of Lublin in eastern Poland.

Majdanek (coming from a suburb of Lublin "Majdan Tatarski") may also refer to:

- Majdanek, Gmina Tomaszów Lubelski, a village in Tomaszów County, Lublin Voivodeship, eastern Poland
- Majdanek, Zamość County, a village in Lublin Voivodeship, eastern Poland

== See also ==
- Majdanpek, village in Serbia
