= Wola Gródecka-Kolonia =

- Village
- Location within Poland
- Coordinates: 50°29′34″N 23°37′39″E
- Country: Poland
- Voivodeship: Lublin
- County: Tomaszów
- Gmina: Jarczów

Wola Gródecka-Kolonia [ˈvɔla ɡruˈdɛt͡ska kɔˈlɔɲa] is a village in the administrative district of Gmina Jarczów, within Tomaszów County, Lublin Voivodeship, in eastern Poland.
