= Dębina, Gmina Tyszowce =

Dębina
- Village
- Location within Poland
- Coordinates: 50°37′00″N 23°42′36″E
- Country: Poland
- Voivodeship: Lublin
- County: Tomaszów
- Gmina: Tyszowce

Dębina [dɛmˈbina] is a village in the administrative district of Gmina Tyszowce, within Tomaszów County, Lublin Voivodeship, in eastern Poland.
