= Siemnice =

- Village
- Location within Poland
- Coordinates: 50°33′14″N 23°37′21″E
- Country: Poland
- Voivodeship: Lublin
- County: Tomaszów
- Gmina: Rachanie
- Population: 390

Siemnice ([ɕɛmˈnit͡sɛ]) is a village in the administrative district of Gmina Rachanie, within Tomaszów County, Lublin Voivodeship, in eastern Poland.

== History ==
In 1942, about 70 people of Jewish origin, including elder people and children, were shot by Germans.
