= Rogóźno, Gmina Tomaszów Lubelski =

Rogóźno
- Village
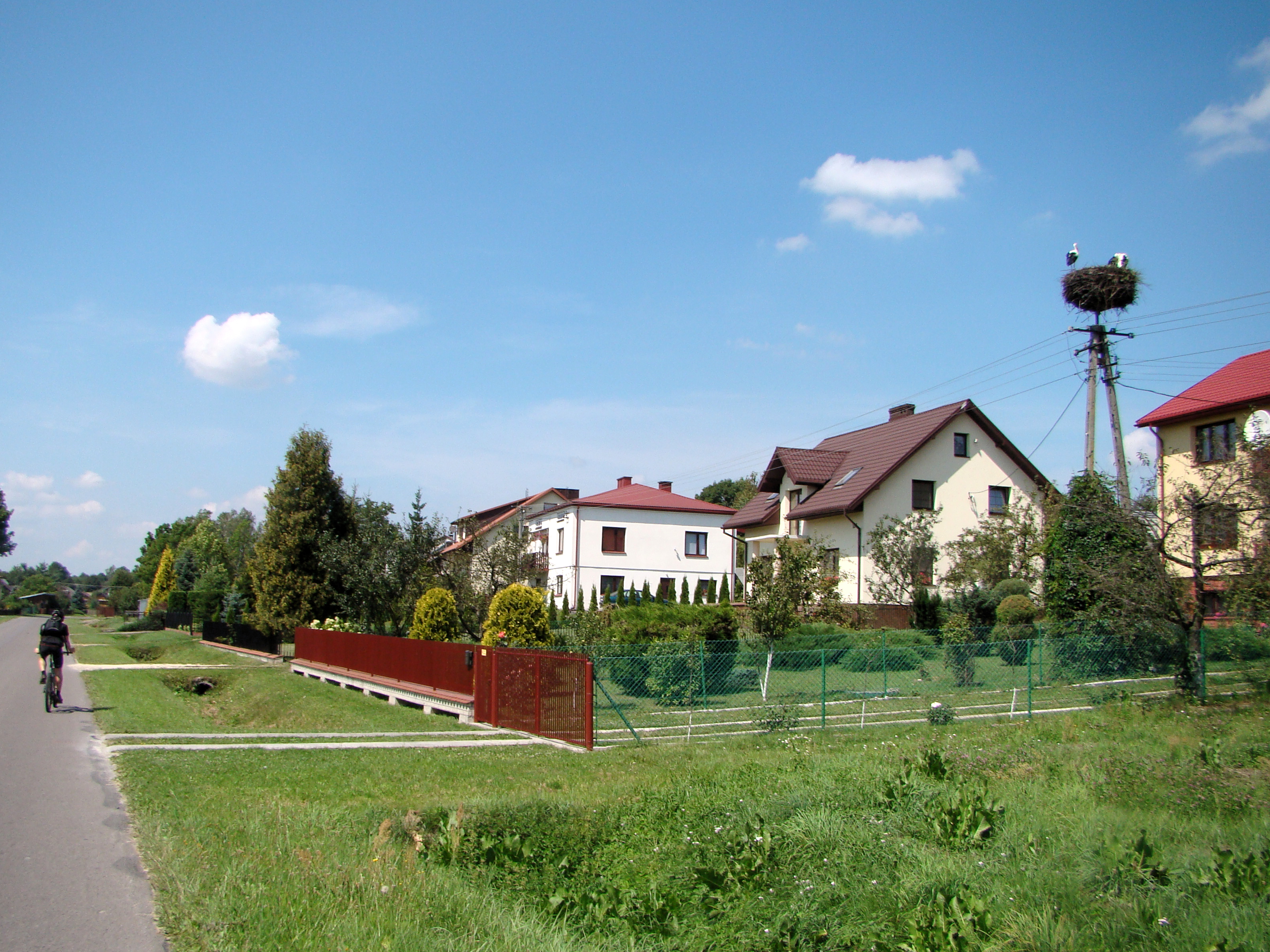

- Location within Poland
- Coordinates: 50°28′N 23°23′E
- Country: Poland
- Voivodeship: Lublin
- County: Tomaszów
- Gmina: Tomaszów Lubelski
- Population: 1,300

Rogóźno [rɔˈɡuʑnɔ] is a village in the administrative district of Gmina Tomaszów Lubelski, within Tomaszów County, Lublin Voivodeship, in eastern Poland.
