= Mikulin, Gmina Tyszowce =

Mikulin
- Village
- Location within Poland
- Coordinates: 50°35′N 23°42′E
- Country: Poland
- Voivodeship: Lublin
- County: Tomaszów
- Gmina: Tyszowce
- Time zone: UTC+1 (CET)
  - Summer (DST): UTC+2 (CEST)

Mikulin [miˈkulin] is a village in the administrative district of Gmina Tyszowce, within Tomaszów County, Lublin Voivodeship, in eastern Poland.

== History ==
13 Polish citizens were murdered by Nazi Germany in the village during World War II.
