= Glinianki, Lublin Voivodeship =

Glinianki
- Village
- Location within Poland
- Coordinates: 50°24′26″N 23°26′31″E
- Country: Poland
- Voivodeship: Lublin
- County: Tomaszów
- Gmina: Tomaszów Lubelski

Glinianki [ɡliˈɲanki] is a village in the administrative district of Gmina Tomaszów Lubelski, within Tomaszów County, Lublin Voivodeship, in eastern Poland.
