= Łubcze =

- Village
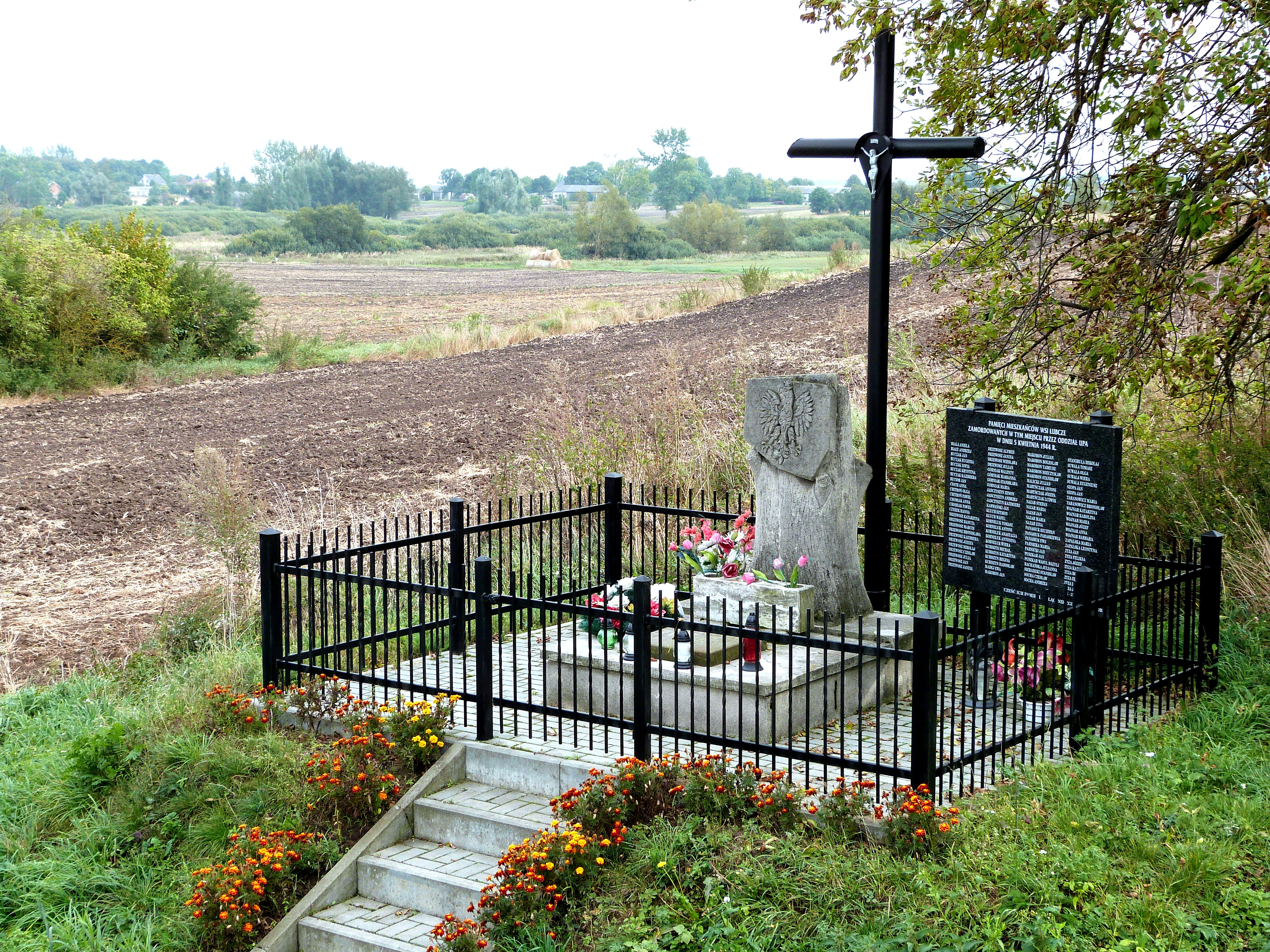
- Memorial at the site of the Łubcze massacre

- Location within Poland
- Coordinates: 50°27′N 23°40′E
- Country: Poland
- Voivodeship: Lublin
- County: Tomaszów
- Gmina: Jarczów

Population
  - Total: 356
- Time zone: UTC+1 (CET)
  - Summer (DST): UTC+2 (CEST)
- Vehicle registration: LTM

Łubcze [ˈwupt͡ʂɛ] is a village in the administrative district of Gmina Jarczów, within Tomaszów County, Lublin Voivodeship, in eastern Poland.

== History ==
According to the 1921 census, the village with the adjacent colony had a population of 415, 88.9% Polish and 11.1% Ukrainian.

Following the German-Soviet invasion of Poland, which started World War II in September 1939, the village was occupied by Germany until 1944. On 5 April 1944, the Ukrainian Insurgent Army committed a massacre of 90 Poles and 26 Ukrainians in the village.
