= Polanówka =

Polanówka may refer to the following places:

- Polanówka, Lublin County in Lublin Voivodeship (east Poland)
- Polanówka, Gmina Wilków, Opole County in Lublin Voivodeship (east Poland)
- Polanówka, Gmina Krynice, Tomaszów County in Lublin Voivodeship (east Poland)
