= Wożuczyn-Cukrownia =

- Settlement
- Location within Poland
- Coordinates: 50°32′47″N 23°35′14″E
- Country: Poland
- Voivodeship: Lublin
- County: Tomaszów
- Gmina: Rachanie
- Population: 789

Wożuczyn-Cukrownia [vɔˈʐut͡ʂɨn t͡suˈkrɔvɲa] is a settlement in the administrative district of Gmina Rachanie, within Tomaszów County, Lublin Voivodeship, in eastern Poland.
