= Wygon, Lublin Voivodeship =

Wygon
- Settlement
- Location within Poland
- Coordinates: 50°27′58″N 23°26′31″E
- Country: Poland
- Voivodeship: Lublin
- County: Tomaszów
- Gmina: Tomaszów Lubelski

Wygon [ˈvɨɡɔn] is a settlement in the administrative district of Gmina Tomaszów Lubelski, within Tomaszów County, Lublin Voivodeship, in eastern Poland.
