= Chorążanka =

- Village
- Location within Poland
- Coordinates: 50°27′03″N 23°28′52″E
- Country: Poland
- Voivodeship: Lublin
- County: Tomaszów
- Gmina: Tomaszów Lubelski

Chorążanka [xɔrɔ̃ˈʐanka] is a village in the administrative district of Gmina Tomaszów Lubelski, within Tomaszów County, Lublin Voivodeship, in eastern Poland.
