= Suminek, Lublin Voivodeship =

Suminek
- Village
- Location within Poland
- Coordinates: 50°32′51″N 23°22′8″E
- Country: Poland
- Voivodeship: Lublin
- County: Tomaszów
- Gmina: Tarnawatka

Suminek [suˈminɛk] is a village in the administrative district of Gmina Tarnawatka, within Tomaszów County, Lublin Voivodeship, in eastern Poland.
