= Gromada, Gmina Tarnawatka =

Gromada
- Village
- Location within Poland
- Coordinates: 50°30′43″N 23°21′01″E
- Country: Poland
- Voivodeship: Lublin
- County: Tomaszów
- Gmina: Tarnawatka

Gromada [ɡrɔˈmada] is a village in the administrative district of Gmina Tarnawatka, within Tomaszów County, Lublin Voivodeship, in eastern Poland.
