= Kolonia Partyzantów =

- Village
- Location within Poland
- Coordinates: 50°33′52″N 23°19′52″E
- Country: Poland
- Voivodeship: Lublin
- County: Tomaszów
- Gmina: Krynice

Kolonia Partyzantów [kɔˈlɔɲa partɨˈzantuf] is a village in the administrative district of Gmina Krynice, within Tomaszów County, Lublin Voivodeship, in eastern Poland.
