= Kolonia Czartowczyk =

- Settlement
- Location within Poland
- Coordinates: 50°35′35″N 23°36′19″E
- Country: Poland
- Voivodeship: Lublin
- County: Tomaszów
- Gmina: Tyszowce

Kolonia Czartowczyk [kɔˈlɔɲa t͡ʂarˈtɔft͡ʂɨk] is a settlement in the administrative district of Gmina Tyszowce, within Tomaszów County, Lublin Voivodeship, in eastern Poland.
