= Łaszczówka-Kolonia =

- Village
- Location within Poland
- Coordinates: 50°25′13″N 23°25′32″E
- Country: Poland
- Voivodeship: Lublin
- County: Tomaszów
- Gmina: Tomaszów Lubelski

Łaszczówka-Kolonia [waʂˈt͡ʂufka kɔˈlɔɲa] is a village in the administrative district of Gmina Tomaszów Lubelski, within Tomaszów County, Lublin Voivodeship, in eastern Poland.
