= Rachanie-Kolonia =

- Settlement
- Location within Poland
- Coordinates: 50°32′36″N 23°29′47″E
- Country: Poland
- Voivodeship: Lublin
- County: Tomaszów
- Gmina: Rachanie

Rachanie-Kolonia [raˈxaɲɛ kɔˈlɔɲa] is a settlement in the administrative district of Gmina Rachanie, within Tomaszów County, Lublin Voivodeship, in eastern Poland.
