= Falkow =

Falkow may refer to:

== Places ==
- Falków, a village in the administrative district of Gmina Rachanie, within Tomaszów County, Lublin Voivodeship, Poland
- Fałków, a village in Końskie County, Świętokrzyskie Voivodeship, Poland
- Gmina Fałków, Końskie County, Świętokrzyskie Voivodeship, in south-central Poland

== People with the surname ==
- Stanley Falkow (1934–2018), American microbiologist and professor of microbiology and immunology
