= Jarczów-Kolonia Pierwsza =

- Village
- Location within Poland
- Coordinates: 50°26′11″N 23°34′26″E
- Country: Poland
- Voivodeship: Lublin
- County: Tomaszów
- Gmina: Jarczów

Jarczów-Kolonia Pierwsza [ˈjart͡ʂuf kɔˈlɔɲa ˈpjɛrfʂa] is a village in the administrative district of Gmina Jarczów, within Tomaszów County, Lublin Voivodeship, in eastern Poland.
