= Sabaudia, Lublin Voivodeship =

Sabaudia
- Village
- Location within Poland
- Coordinates: 50°28′15″N 23°26′00″E
- Country: Poland
- Voivodeship: Lublin
- County: Tomaszów
- Gmina: Tomaszów Lubelski
- Elevation: 330 m (1,080 ft)
- Population: 600

Sabaudia [saˈbau̯dja] is a village in the administrative district of Gmina Tomaszów Lubelski, within Tomaszów County, Lublin Voivodeship, in eastern Poland.
