= Maziarnia, Gmina Tomaszów Lubelski =

Maziarnia
- Settlement
- Location within Poland
- Coordinates: 50°27′08″N 23°23′49″E
- Country: Poland
- Voivodeship: Lublin
- County: Tomaszów
- Gmina: Tomaszów Lubelski

Maziarnia [maˈʑarɲa] is a settlement in the administrative district of Gmina Tomaszów Lubelski, within Tomaszów County, Lublin Voivodeship, in eastern Poland.
