= Gmina Tarnawatka =

Gmina Tarnawatka Tarnawatka Commune
- Gmina
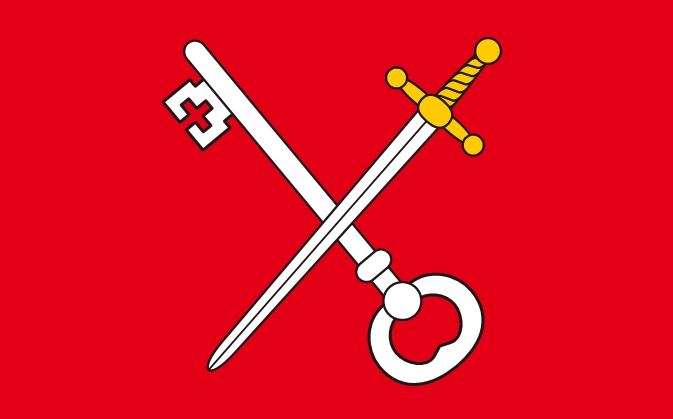
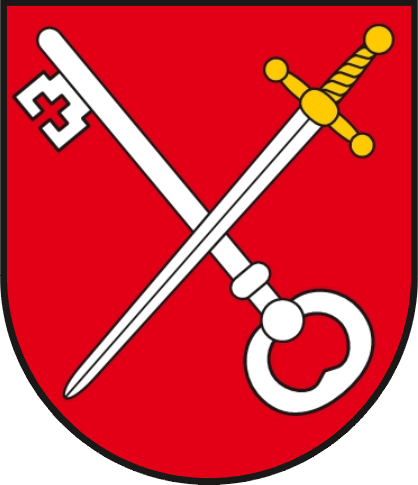
- Flag Coat of arms

- Location within Poland
- Coordinates (Tarnawatka): 50°32′N 23°23′E
- Country: Poland
- Voivodeship: Lublin
- County: Tomaszów
- Seat: Tarnawatka

Area
  - Total: 82.66 km^{2} (31.92 sq mi)

Population (2013)
  - Total: 4,031
  - Density: 48.77/km^{2} (126.3/sq mi)
- Area code: (+48) 84
- Vehicle registration: LTM
- Website: http://www.tarnawatka.pl

Gmina Tarnawatka is a rural gmina (administrative district) in Tomaszów County, Lublin Voivodeship, in eastern Poland. Its seat is the village of Tarnawatka, which lies approximately 10 kilometres (6 mi) north of Tomaszów Lubelski and 98 km (61 mi) south-east of the regional capital Lublin.

The gmina covers an area of 82.66 square kilometres (31.9 sq mi), and as of 2006 its total population is 4,050 (4,031 in 2013).

== Villages ==
Gmina Tarnawatka contains the villages and settlements of Dąbrowa Tarnawacka, Górka, Gromada, Hatczyska, Hatczyska-Kolonia, Huta Tarnawacka, Kaliszaki, Klocówka, Kocia Wólka, Kolonia Klocówka, Kunówka, Łanowe Sołtysy, Niemirówek, Niemirówek-Kolonia, Pańków, Pauczne, Petrynówka, Podhucie, Pucharki, Skrzypny Ostrów, Sumin, Suminek, Tarnawatka, Tarnawatka-Tartak, Tymin, Wieprzów Ordynacki, Wieprzów Tarnawacki and Zaolzie.

== Neighbouring gminas ==
Gmina Tarnawatka is bordered by the gminas of Krasnobród, Krynice, Rachanie and Tomaszów Lubelski.
