= Gmina Tyszowce =

Gmina Tyszowce Tyszowce Commune
- Gmina
- Coat of arms
- Interactive map of Gmina Tyszowce
- Coordinates (Tyszowce): 50°37′6″N 23°42′35″E
- Country: Poland
- Voivodeship: Lublin
- County: Tomaszów
- Seat: Tyszowce

Area
  - Total: 129.48 km^{2} (49.99 sq mi)

Population (2013)
  - Total: 5,910
  - Density: 45.6/km^{2} (118/sq mi)
  - Urban: 2,171
  - Rural: 3,739
- Website: https://www.tyszowce.pl

Gmina Tyszowce is an urban-rural gmina (administrative district) in Tomaszów County, Lublin Voivodeship, in eastern Poland. Its seat is the town of Tyszowce, which lies approximately 28 kilometres (17 mi) north-east of Tomaszów Lubelski and 107 km (66 mi) south-east of the regional capital Lublin.

The gmina covers an area of 129.48 square kilometres (50.0 sq mi), and as of 2006 its total population is 6,258 (out of which the population of Tyszowce amounts to 2,242, and the population of the rural part of the gmina is 4,016).

== Villages ==
Apart from the town of Tyszowce, Gmina Tyszowce contains the villages and settlements of Czartowczyk, Czartowiec, Czartowiec-Kolonia, Czermno, Dębina, Gwoździak, Kaliwy, Kazimierówka, Klątwy, Kolonia, Kolonia Czartowczyk, Kolonia Mikulin, Lipowiec, Marysin, Mikulin, Nowinki, Perespa, Perespa-Kolonia, Pierwszaki, Podbór, Przewale, Rudka, Soból, Trzeciaki, Wakijów, Wojciechówka and Zamłynie.

== Neighbouring gminas ==
Gmina Tyszowce is bordered by the gminas of Komarów-Osada, Łaszczów, Miączyn, Mircze, Rachanie and Werbkowice.
