= Jarczów =

- Village
- Location within Poland
- Coordinates: 50°25′N 23°36′E
- Country: Poland
- Voivodeship: Lublin
- County: Tomaszów
- Gmina: Jarczów
- Population: 876

Jarczów [ˈjart͡ʂuf] is a village in Tomaszów County, Lublin Voivodeship, in eastern Poland. It is the seat of the gmina (administrative district) called Gmina Jarczów.

During the Holocaust, the Jewish population of the town—numbering 250 to 400 Jews—was murdered at the Bełżec gas chambers.

The village has a current population of 876.
