= Gmina Rachanie =

Gmina Rachanie Rachanie Commune
- Gmina
- Coat of arms
- Interactive map of Gmina Rachanie
- Coordinates (Rachanie): 50°32′N 23°33′E
- Country: Poland
- Voivodeship: Lublin
- County: Tomaszów
- Seat: Rachanie

Area
  - Total: 94.05 km^{2} (36.31 sq mi)

Population (2013)
  - Total: 5,376
  - Density: 57.16/km^{2} (148.0/sq mi)
- Website: http://www.rachanie.lubelskie.pl

Gmina Rachanie is a rural gmina (administrative district) in Tomaszów County, Lublin Voivodeship, in eastern Poland. Its seat is the village of Rachanie, which lies approximately 14 kilometres (9 mi) north-east of Tomaszów Lubelski and 105 km (65 mi) south-east of the regional capital Lublin.

The gmina covers an area of 94.05 square kilometres (36.3 sq mi), and as of 2006 its total population is 5,676 (5,376 in 2013).

== Villages ==
Gmina Rachanie contains the villages and settlements of Falków, Grodysławice, Grodysławice-Kolonia, Józefówka, Kociuba, Kozia Wola, Michalów, Michalów-Kolonia, Pawłówka, Rachanie, Rachanie-Kolonia, Siemierz, Siemnice, Werechanie, Werechanie-Kolonia, Wożuczyn, Wożuczyn-Cukrownia, Zwiartówek and Zwiartówek-Kolonia.

== Neighbouring gminas ==
Gmina Rachanie is bordered by the gminas of Jarczów, Komarów-Osada, Krynice, Łaszczów, Tarnawatka, Tomaszów Lubelski and Tyszowce.
