= Niemirówek =

- Village
- Location within Poland
- Coordinates: 50°33′N 23°20′E
- Country: Poland
- Voivodeship: Lublin
- County: Tomaszów
- Gmina: Tarnawatka

Niemirówek [ɲɛmiˈruvɛk] is a village in the administrative district of Gmina Tarnawatka, within Tomaszów County, Lublin Voivodeship, in eastern Poland.
