= Sołokija, Lublin Voivodeship =

Sołokija
- Settlement
- Location within Poland
- Coordinates: 50°24′44″N 23°28′12″E
- Country: Poland
- Voivodeship: Lublin
- County: Tomaszów
- Gmina: Tomaszów Lubelski

Sołokija [sɔwɔˈkija] is a settlement in the administrative district of Gmina Tomaszów Lubelski, within Tomaszów County, Lublin Voivodeship, in eastern Poland.
