= Krynice, Lublin Voivodeship =

Krynice
- Village
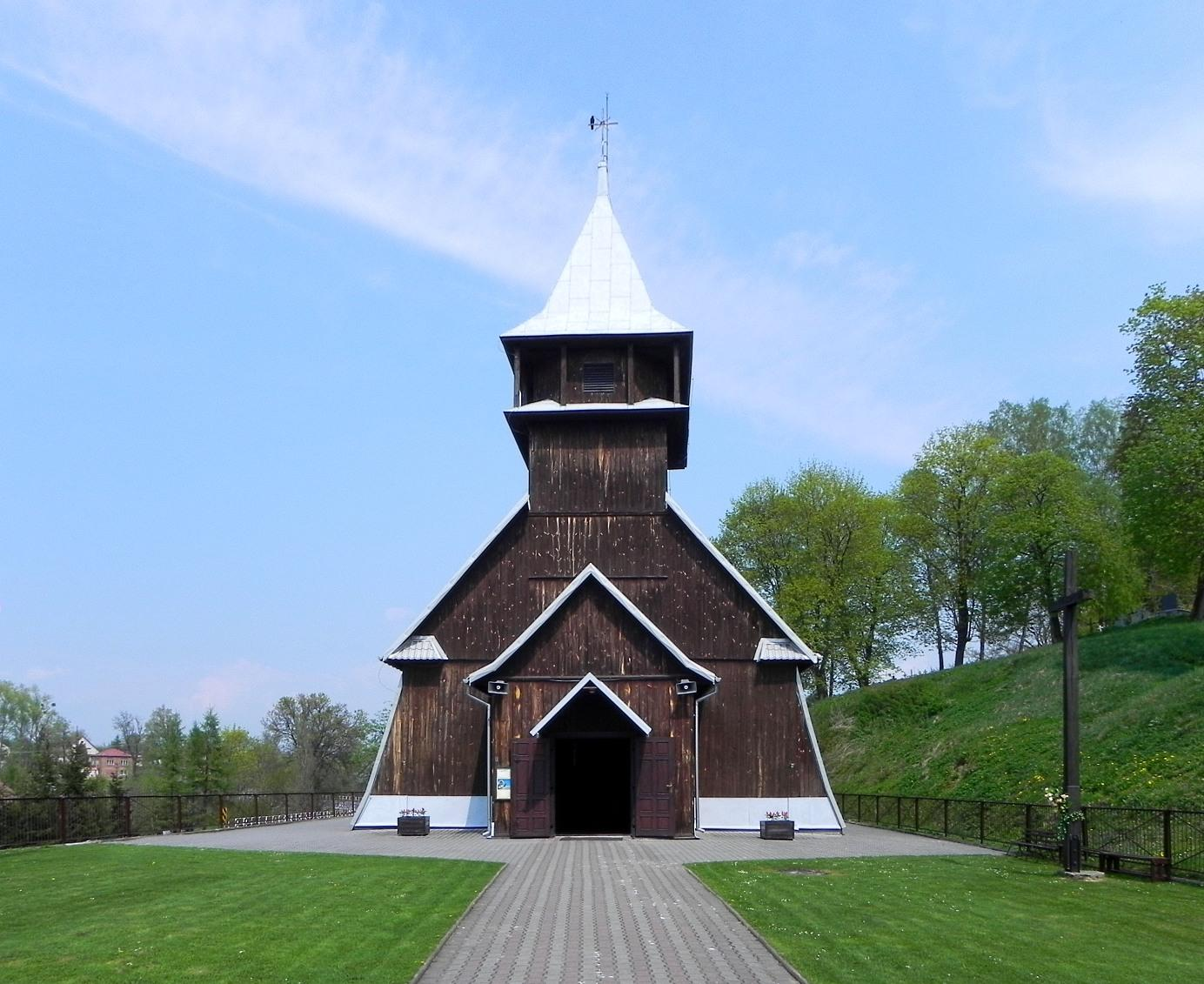
- Saint Stanislaus church in Krynice

- Location within Poland
- Coordinates: 50°35′N 23°23′E
- Country: Poland
- Voivodeship: Lublin
- County: Tomaszów
- Gmina: Krynice
- Time zone: UTC+1 (CET)
  - Summer (DST): UTC+2 (CEST)
- Vehicle registration: LTM

Krynice [krɨˈnit͡sɛ] is a village in Tomaszów County, Lublin Voivodeship, in eastern Poland. It is the seat of the gmina (administrative district) called Gmina Krynice.
