= Rachanie =

- Village
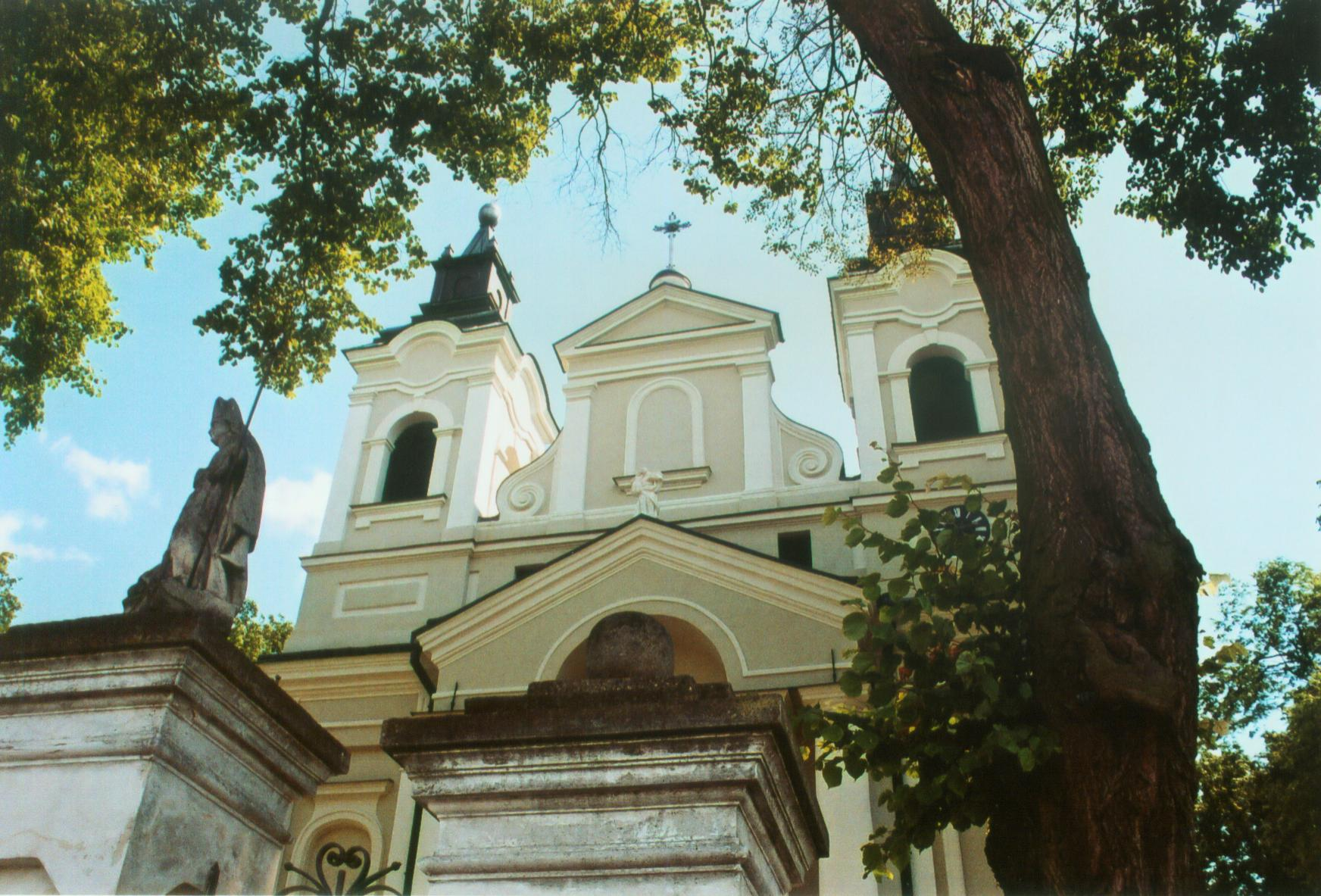
- Church of the Transfiguration in Rachanie

- Location within Poland
- Coordinates: 50°32′N 23°33′E
- Country: Poland
- Voivodeship: Lublin
- County: Tomaszów
- Gmina: Rachanie

Population
  - Total: 990
- Time zone: UTC+1 (CET)
  - Summer (DST): UTC+2 (CEST)
- Vehicle registration: LTM

Rachanie [raˈxaɲɛ] is a village in Tomaszów County, Lublin Voivodeship, in eastern Poland. It is the seat of the gmina (administrative district) called Gmina Rachanie.
