= Sznury =

- Internal part of Tomaszów Lubelski
- Location within Poland
- Coordinates: 50°27′N 23°27′E
- Country: Poland
- Voivodeship: Lublin
- County: Tomaszów
- Part of: Tomaszów Lubelski

Sznury [ˈʂnurɨ] is an internal part of Tomaszów Lubelski, within Tomaszów County, Lublin Voivodeship, in eastern Poland.
