= Gmina Krynice =

Gmina Krynice Krynice Commune
- Gmina
- Interactive map of Gmina Krynice
- Coordinates (Krynice): 50°35′N 23°23′E
- Country: Poland
- Voivodeship: Lublin
- County: Tomaszów
- Seat: Krynice

Area
  - Total: 73.58 km^{2} (28.41 sq mi)

Population (2013)
  - Total: 3,405
  - Density: 46.28/km^{2} (119.9/sq mi)
- Website: http://www.krynice.gmina.woi.lublin.pl

Gmina Krynice is a rural gmina (administrative district) in Tomaszów County, Lublin Voivodeship, in eastern Poland. Its seat is the village of Krynice, which lies approximately 15 kilometres (9 mi) north of Tomaszów Lubelski and 94 km (58 mi) south-east of the regional capital Lublin.

The gmina covers an area of 73.58 square kilometres (28.4 sq mi), and as of 2006 its total population is 3,634 (3,405 in 2013).

== Villages ==
Gmina Krynice contains the villages and settlements of Antoniówka, Budy Dzierążyńskie, Dąbrowa, Dzierążnia, Huta Dzierążyńska, Kolonia Partyzantów, Krynice, Majdan Krynicki, Majdan Sielec, Polanówka, Polany, Romanówka, Zaboreczno, Zadnoga, Zwiartów and Zwiartów-Kolonia.

== Neighbouring gminas ==
Gmina Krynice is bordered by the gminas of Adamów, Komarów-Osada, Krasnobród, Łabunie, Rachanie and Tarnawatka.
