= Gmina Jarczów =

Gmina Jarczów Jarczów Commune
- Gmina
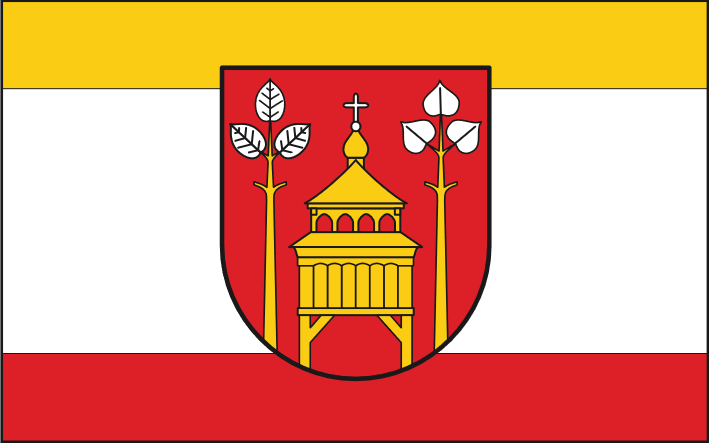
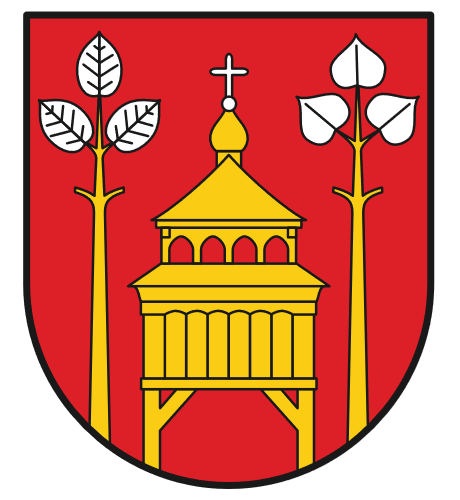
- Flag Coat of arms
- Interactive map of Gmina Jarczów
- Coordinates (Jarczów): 50°25′N 23°36′E
- Country: Poland
- Voivodeship: Lublin
- County: Tomaszów
- Seat: Jarczów

Area
  - Total: 107.5 km^{2} (41.5 sq mi)

Population (2013)
  - Total: 3,642
  - Density: 33.88/km^{2} (87.75/sq mi)

Gmina Jarczów is a rural gmina (administrative district) in Tomaszów County, Lublin Voivodeship, in eastern Poland. Its seat is the village of Jarczów, which lies approximately 14 kilometres (9 mi) east of Tomaszów Lubelski and 118 km (73 mi) south-east of the regional capital Lublin.

The gmina covers an area of 107.5 square kilometres (41.5 sq mi), and as of 2006 its total population is 3,618 (3,642 in 2013).

== Villages ==
Gmina Jarczów contains the villages and settlements of Chodywańce, Gródek, Gródek-Kolonia, Jarczów, Jarczów-Kolonia Druga, Jarczów-Kolonia Pierwsza, Jurów, Korhynie, Łubcze, Nedeżów, Plebanka, Przewłoka, Sowiniec, Szlatyn, Wierszczyca, Wola Gródecka, Wola Gródecka-Kolonia and Zawady.

== Neighbouring gminas ==
Gmina Jarczów is bordered by the gminas of Łaszczów, Lubycza Królewska, Rachanie, Tomaszów Lubelski and Ulhówek.
