= Podhorce =

Podhorce may refer to:

- Polish name for Pidhirtsi in Ukraine
- Podhorce, Hrubieszów County in Lublin Voivodeship (east Poland)
- Podhorce, Gmina Tomaszów Lubelski, Tomaszów County in Lublin Voivodeship (east Poland)
