= Falków =

- Village
- Location within Poland
- Coordinates: 50°32′47″N 23°30′13″E
- Country: Poland
- Voivodeship: Lublin
- County: Tomaszów
- Gmina: Rachanie
- Population: 19

Falków [ˈfalkuf] is a village in the administrative district of Gmina Rachanie, within Tomaszów County, Lublin Voivodeship, in eastern Poland.
