= Ludwik Łętowski =

Former Titular Bishop of Ioppe

- Auxiliary Bishop of Kraków; Titular Bishop of Ioppe
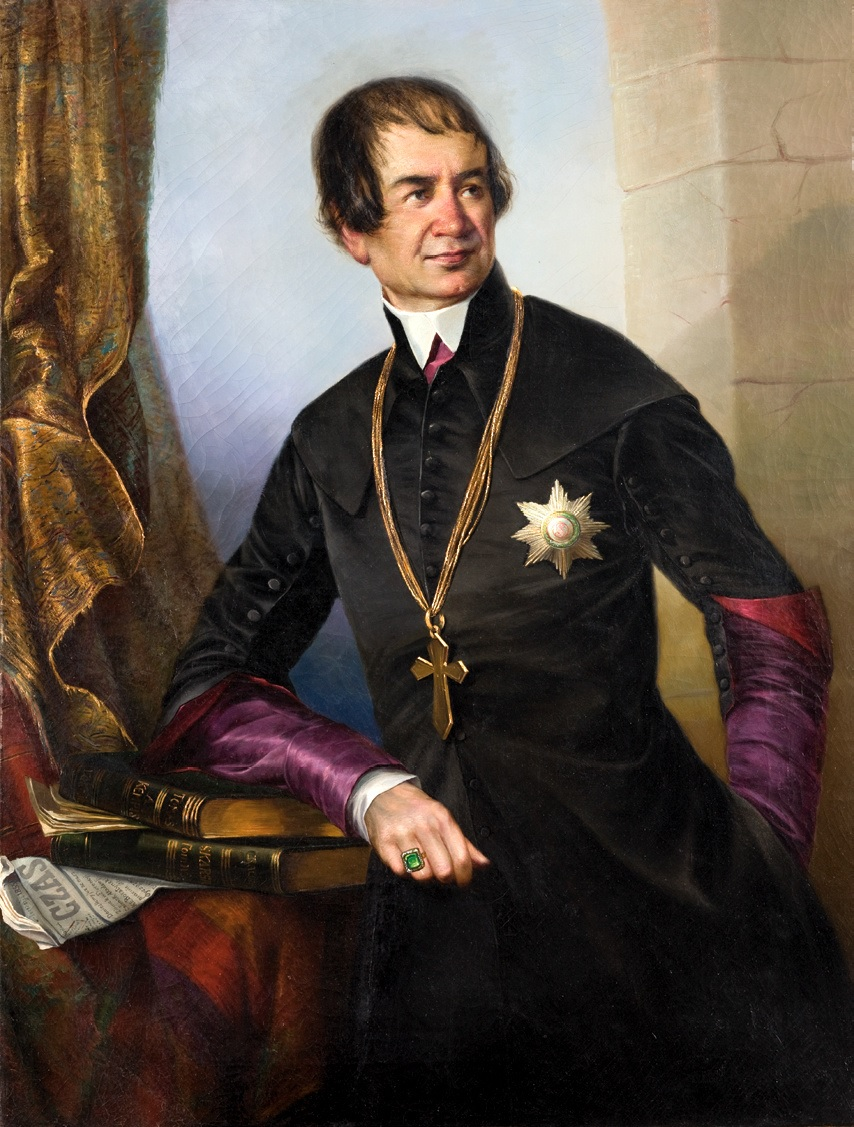
- Wearing the Order of Saint Stanislaus
- Predecessor: Franciszek Zglenicki

Orders
- Consecration: by Bishop Kazimierz Dmochowski

Personal details
- Born: 1786 Tarnawatka
- Died: 1868 (aged 81–82)
- Denomination: Catholic Church
- Coat of arms

Ludwik Łętowski (13 September 1786 – 25 August 1868) was a Polish writer and clergyman who was Titular Bishop of Ioppe.

== Biography ==
Łętowski was born in Tarnawatka to a family that claimed the Ogończyk coat of arms. According to writer Hipolit Stupnicki, Łętowski received military decorations for service with a Galician unit and was also a prisoner of war in 1812. After his military service, Łętowski joined the clergy and became a priest by 1818. In 1845, Łętowski became bishop of the titular see of Ioppe. He was also made Auxiliary Bishop of Kraków. In 1861, Łętowski ordained Albin Dunajewski who would later become Bishop of Kraków and cardinal.

Łętowski died in 1868. According to historian Jolanta Pekacz, Łętowski labeled the intelligentsia as "idlers" and "revolutionary communists" who "wanted to turn the world around" due to their dislike of higher social classes. These views existed within the context of broader class-based frictions in Europe at the time. Historian Karol Mecherzyński considered Łętowski to be biased towards the side of the nobility.

== Works ==
=== Titles ===
- Katalog biskupoẃ krakowskich
- Katedra na Wawelu

=== Gallery ===
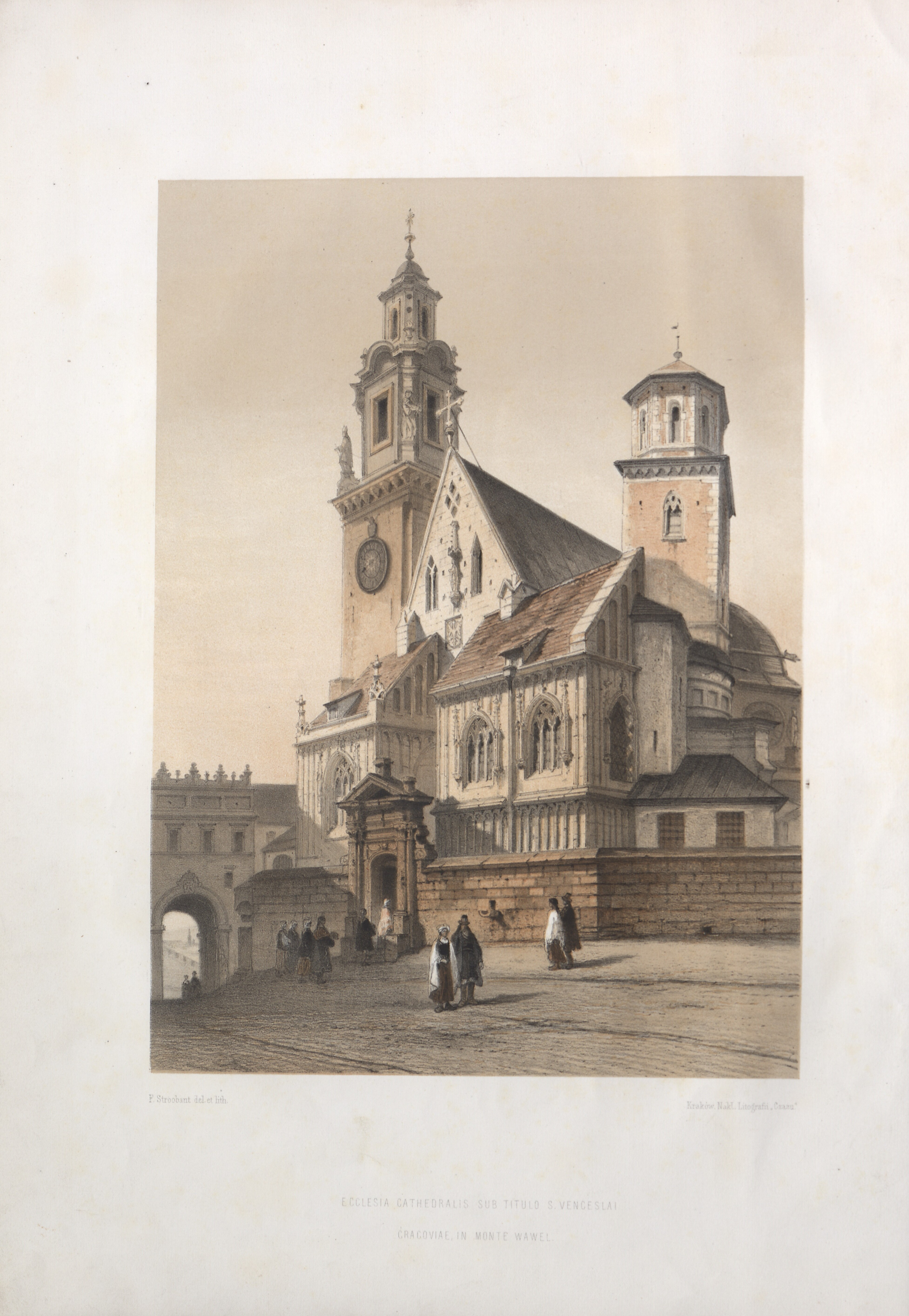
Wawel Cathedral, Katedra na Wawelu (1859)

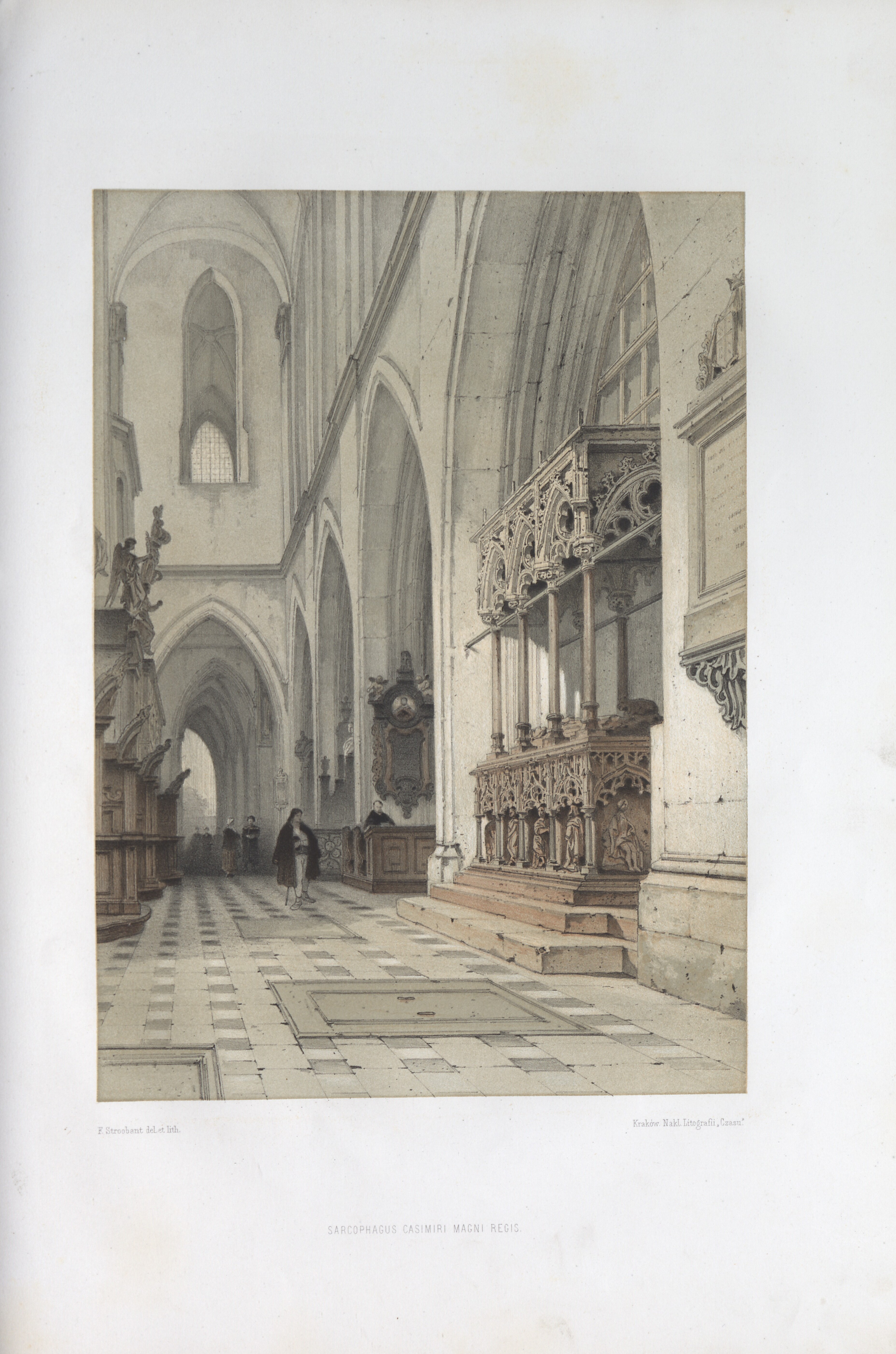
Wawel Cathedral interior, Katedra na Wawelu (1859)

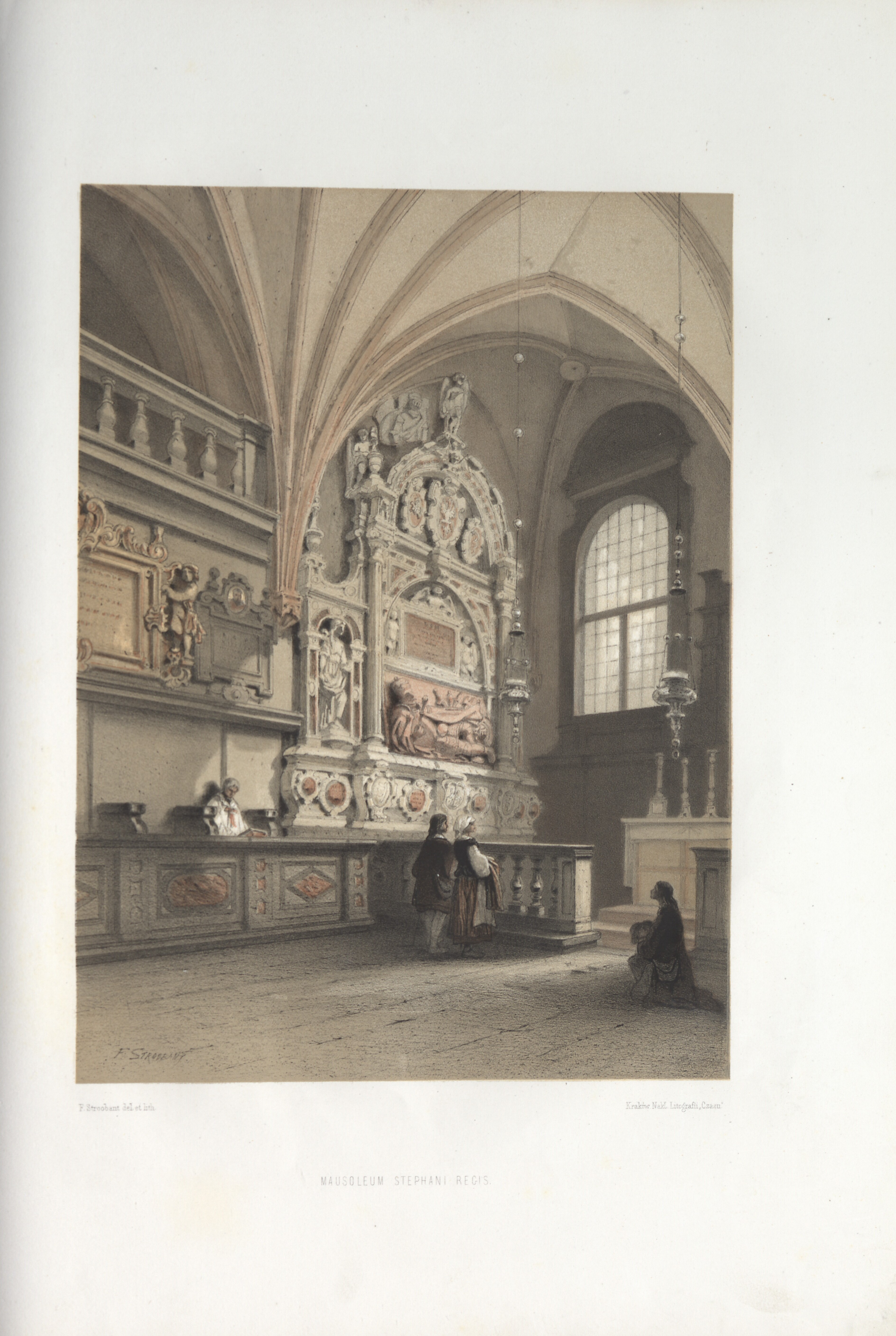
Wawel Cathedral interior, Katedra na Wawelu (1859)
