= Polanówka, Gmina Krynice =

Polanówka
- Village
- Location within Poland
- Coordinates: 50°36′09″N 23°21′49″E
- Country: Poland
- Voivodeship: Lublin
- County: Tomaszów
- Gmina: Krynice

Polanówka [pɔlaˈnufka] is a village in the administrative district of Gmina Krynice, within Tomaszów County, Lublin Voivodeship, in eastern Poland.
