= Tarnawatka =

- Village
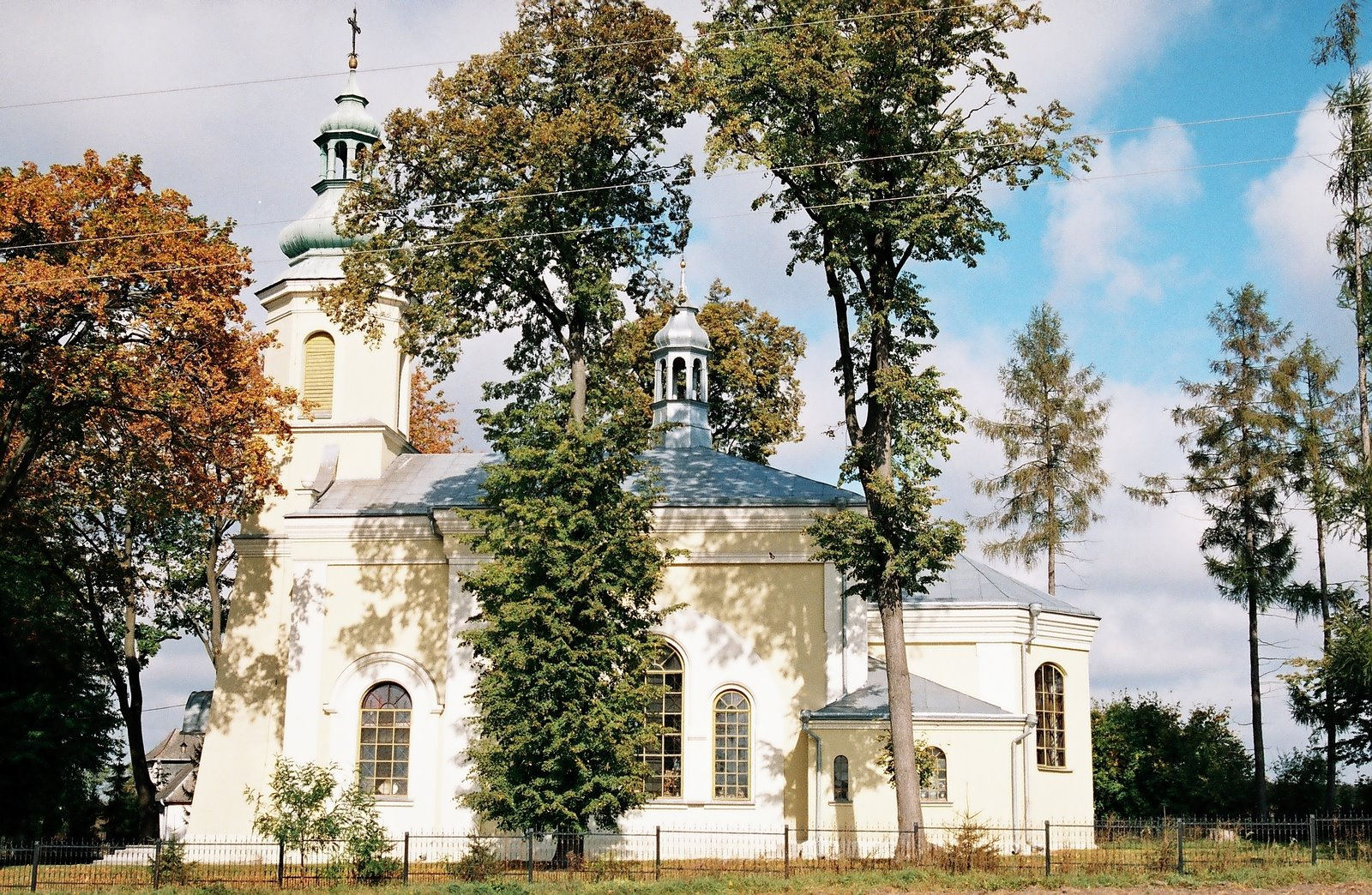
- Saint Peter and Paul Catholic Church

- Location within Poland
- Coordinates: 50°32′N 23°23′E
- Country: Poland
- Voivodeship: Lublin
- County: Tomaszów
- Gmina: Tarnawatka

Tarnawatka [tarnaˈvatka] is a village in Tomaszów County, Lublin Voivodeship, in eastern Poland. It is the seat of the gmina (administrative district) called Gmina Tarnawatka.
