= Tomaszów County, Lublin Voivodeship =

Tomaszów County Powiat tomaszowski
- County
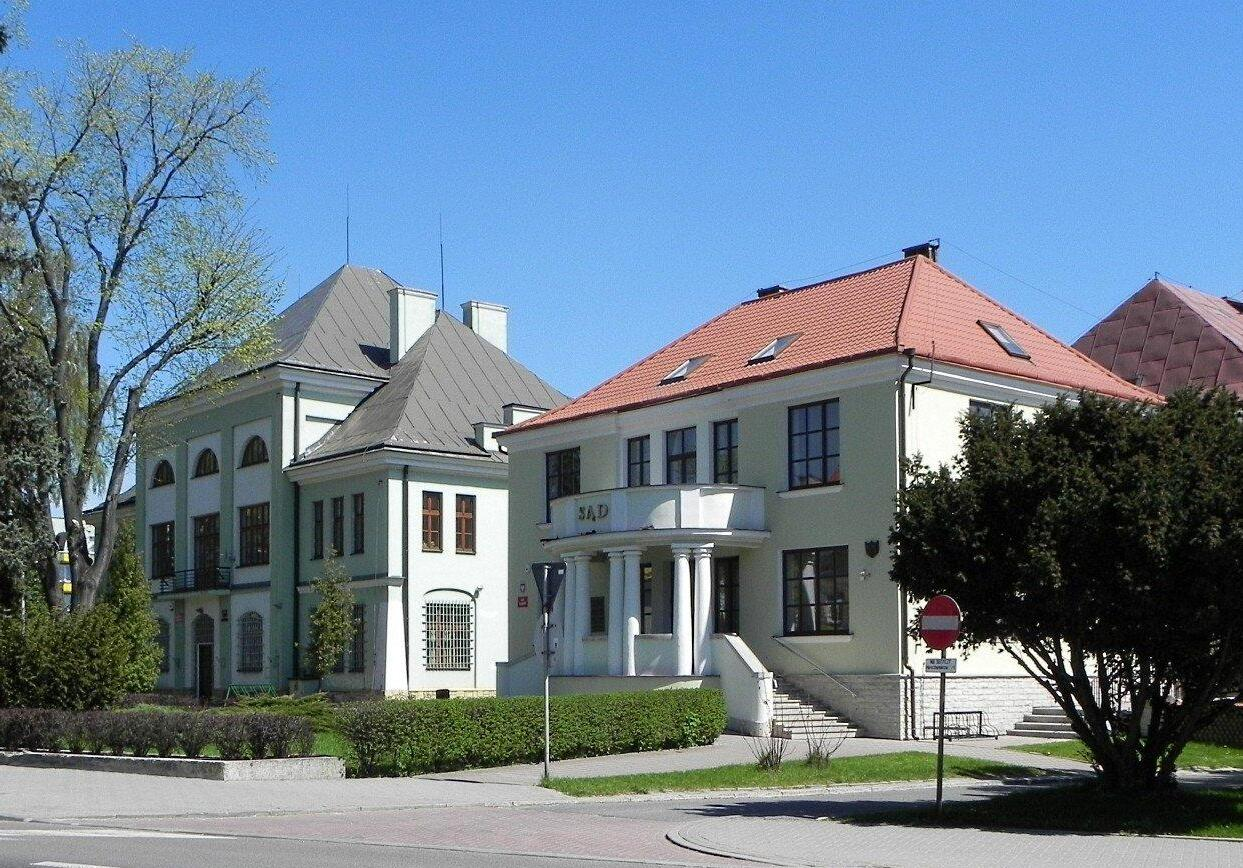
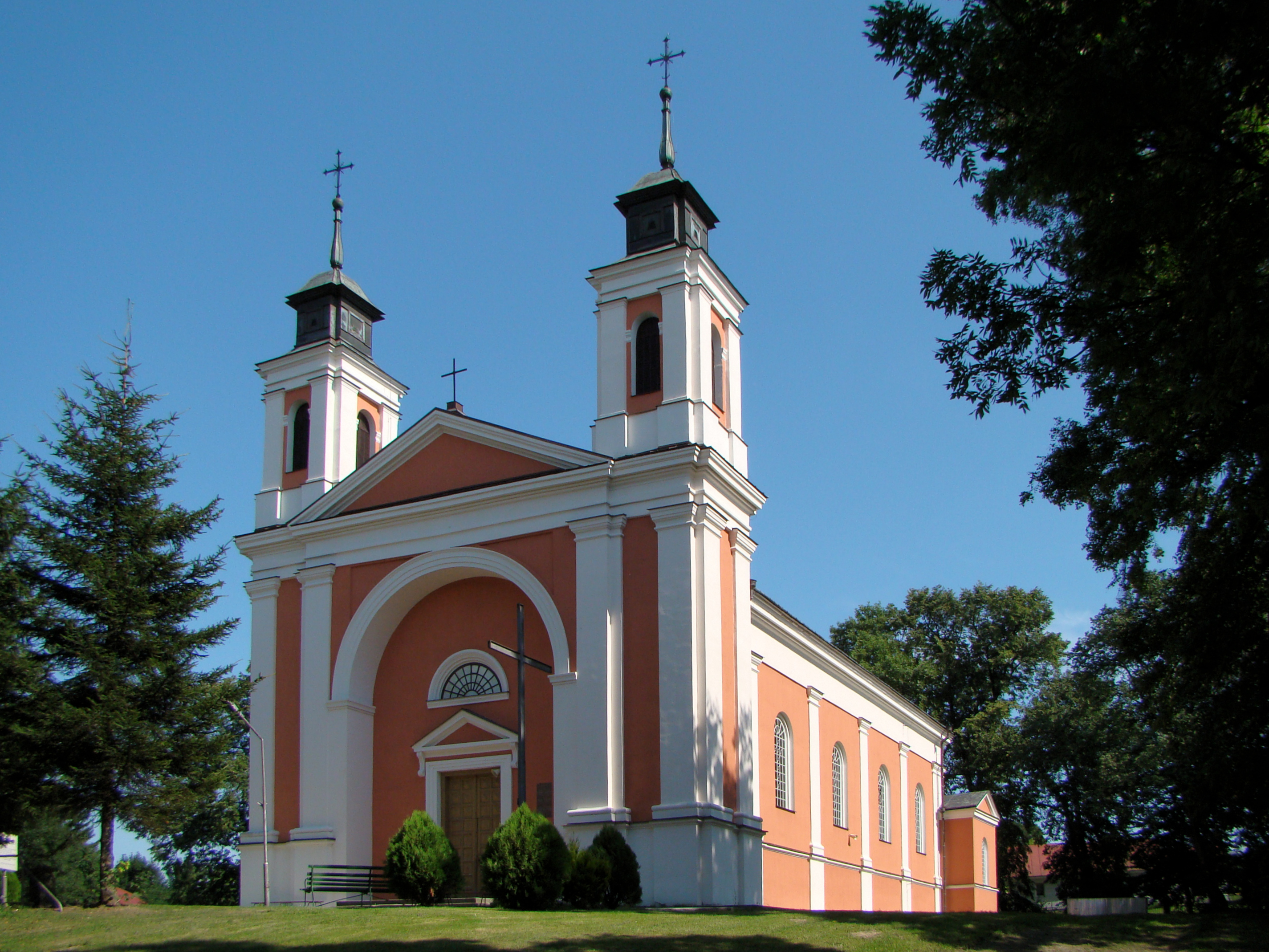
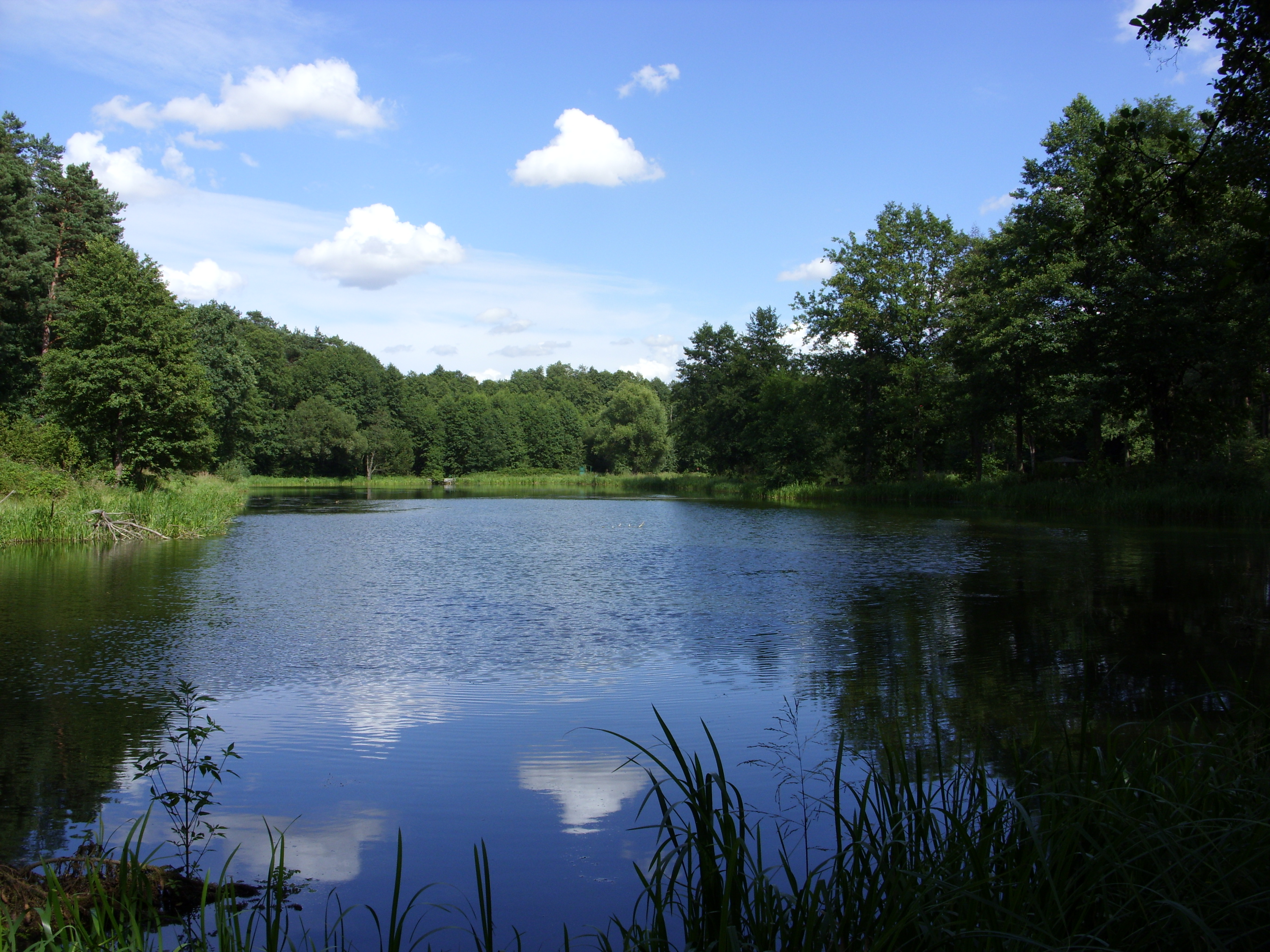
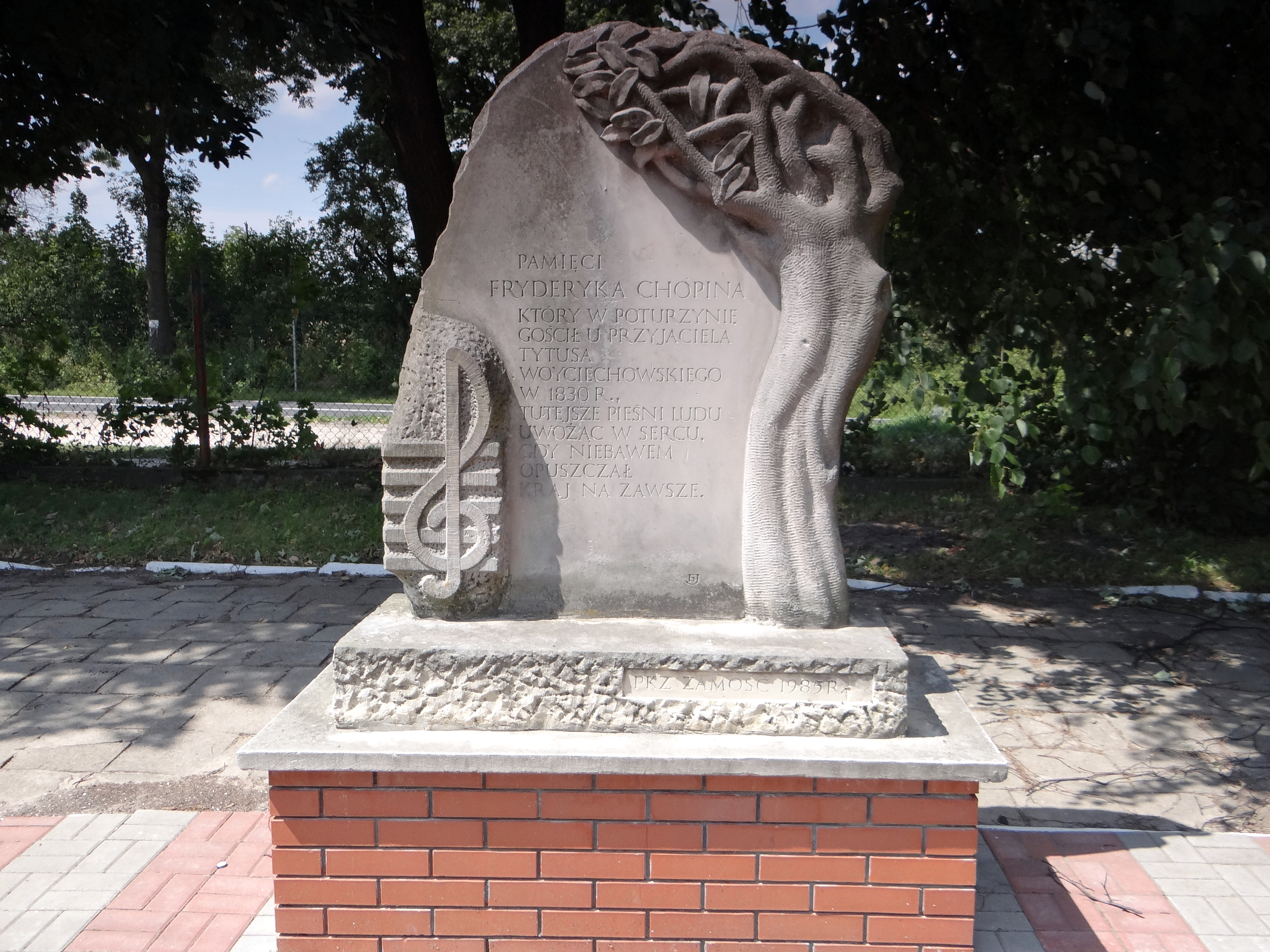
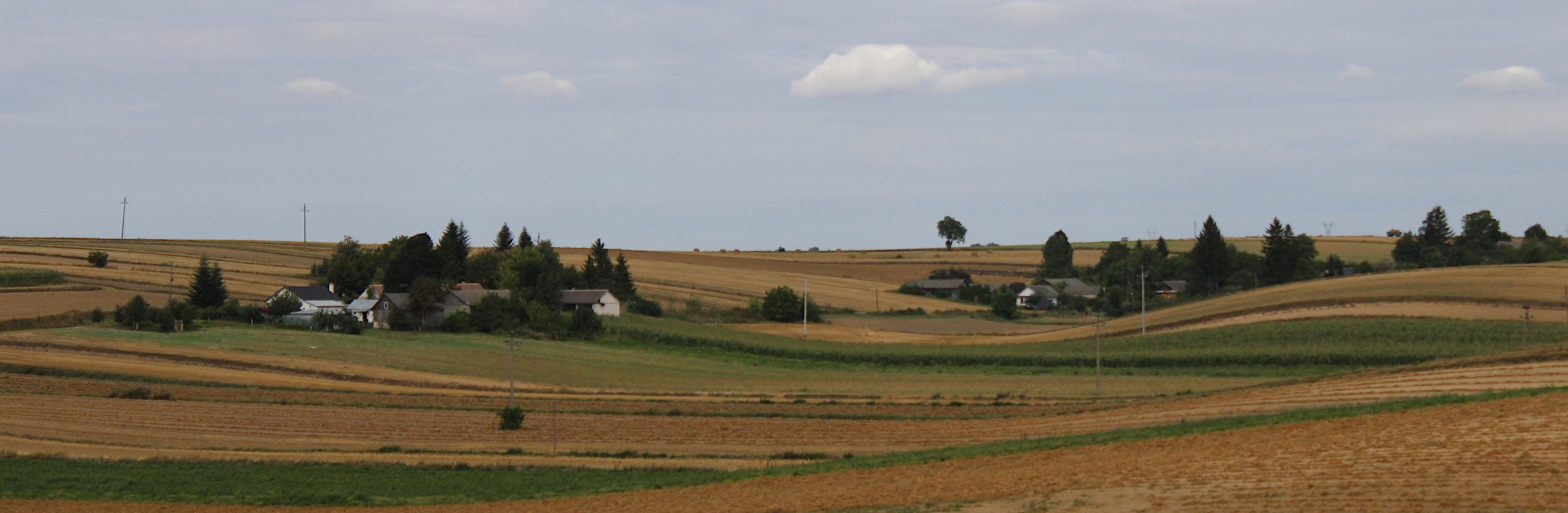
- Registry Office and Court in Tomaszów Saint Leonard church in Tyszowce Młynki Lake in Żyłka Monument to Frederic Chopin in Poturzyn Countryside in Pukarzów-Kolonia

- Flag Coat of arms

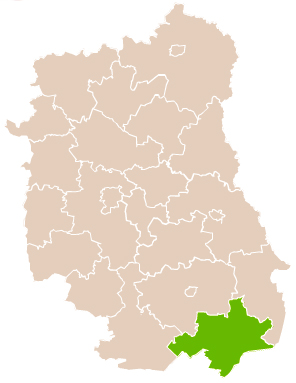
- Location within the voivodeship
- Coordinates (Tomaszów Lubelski): 50°27′N 23°25′E
- Country: Poland
- Voivodeship: Lublin
- Seat: Tomaszów Lubelski
- Gminas: Total 13 (incl. 1 urban): Tomaszów Lubelski; Gmina Bełżec; Gmina Jarczów; Gmina Krynice; Gmina Łaszczów; Gmina Lubycza Królewska; Gmina Rachanie; Gmina Susiec; Gmina Tarnawatka; Gmina Telatyn; Gmina Tomaszów Lubelski; Gmina Tyszowce; Gmina Ulhówek

Area
  - Total: 1,487.1 km^{2} (574.2 sq mi)

Population (2019)
  - Total: 80,701
  - Density: 54.267/km^{2} (140.55/sq mi)
  - Urban: 23,301
  - Rural: 57,400
- Time zone: UTC+1 (CET)
  - Summer (DST): UTC+2 (CEST)
- Car plates: LTM
- Website: www.powiat-tomaszowski.com.pl

Tomaszów County (Polish: powiat tomaszowski) is a unit of territorial administration and local government (powiat) in Lublin Voivodeship, south-eastern Poland, on the border with Ukraine. It was established on January 1, 1999, as a result of the Polish local government reforms passed in 1998. Its administrative seat and largest town is Tomaszów Lubelski, which lies 107 kilometres (66 mi) south-east of the regional capital Lublin. The only other towns in the county are Tyszowce, lying 28 km (17 mi) north-east of Tomaszów, and Łaszczów, lying 25 km (16 mi) east of Tomaszów.

The county covers an area of 1,487.1 square kilometres (574.2 sq mi). As of 2019, its total population was 80,701, including a population of 19,050 in Tomaszów Lubelski, 2,112 in Tyszowce, 2,139 in Łaszczów, and a rural population of 57,400.

== Neighbouring counties ==
Tomaszów County is bordered by Lubaczów County to the south-west, Biłgoraj County to the west, Zamość County to the north and Hrubieszów County to the north-east. It also borders Ukraine to the south-east.

== Administrative divisions ==
The county is subdivided into 13 gminas (one urban, three urban-rural and nine rural). These are listed in the following table, in descending order of population.

Gmina	Type	Area (km^{2})	Population (2019)	Seat
Tomaszów Lubelski	urban	13.3	19,050	
Gmina Tomaszów Lubelski	rural	170.8	11,431	Tomaszów Lubelski (Note: seat not part of the gmina)
Gmina Susiec	rural	190.5	7,458	Susiec
Gmina Łaszczów	urban-rural	128.2	6,010	Łaszczów
Gmina Tyszowce	urban-rural	129.5	5,548	Tyszowce
Gmina Rachanie	rural	94.1	5,099	Rachanie
Gmina Ulhówek	rural	146.6	4,580	Ulhówek
Gmina Telatyn	rural	109.7	3,950	Telatyn
Gmina Tarnawatka	rural	82.7	3,922	Tarnawatka
Gmina Lubycza Królewska	urban-rural	208.9	3,732	Lubycza Królewska
Gmina Jarczów	rural	107.5	3,391	Jarczów
Gmina Bełżec	rural	33.5	3,301	Bełżec
Gmina Krynice	rural	73.6	3,229	Krynice

== See also ==
- Battle of Tomaszow Lubelski
