= Podlodów =

Podlodów may refer to the following places:

- Podlodów, Ryki County in Lublin Voivodeship (east Poland)
- Podlodów, Gmina Łaszczów in Lublin Voivodeship (east Poland)
- Podlodów, Gmina Ulhówek in Lublin Voivodeship (east Poland)
