= Jakob Beinhart =

German painter

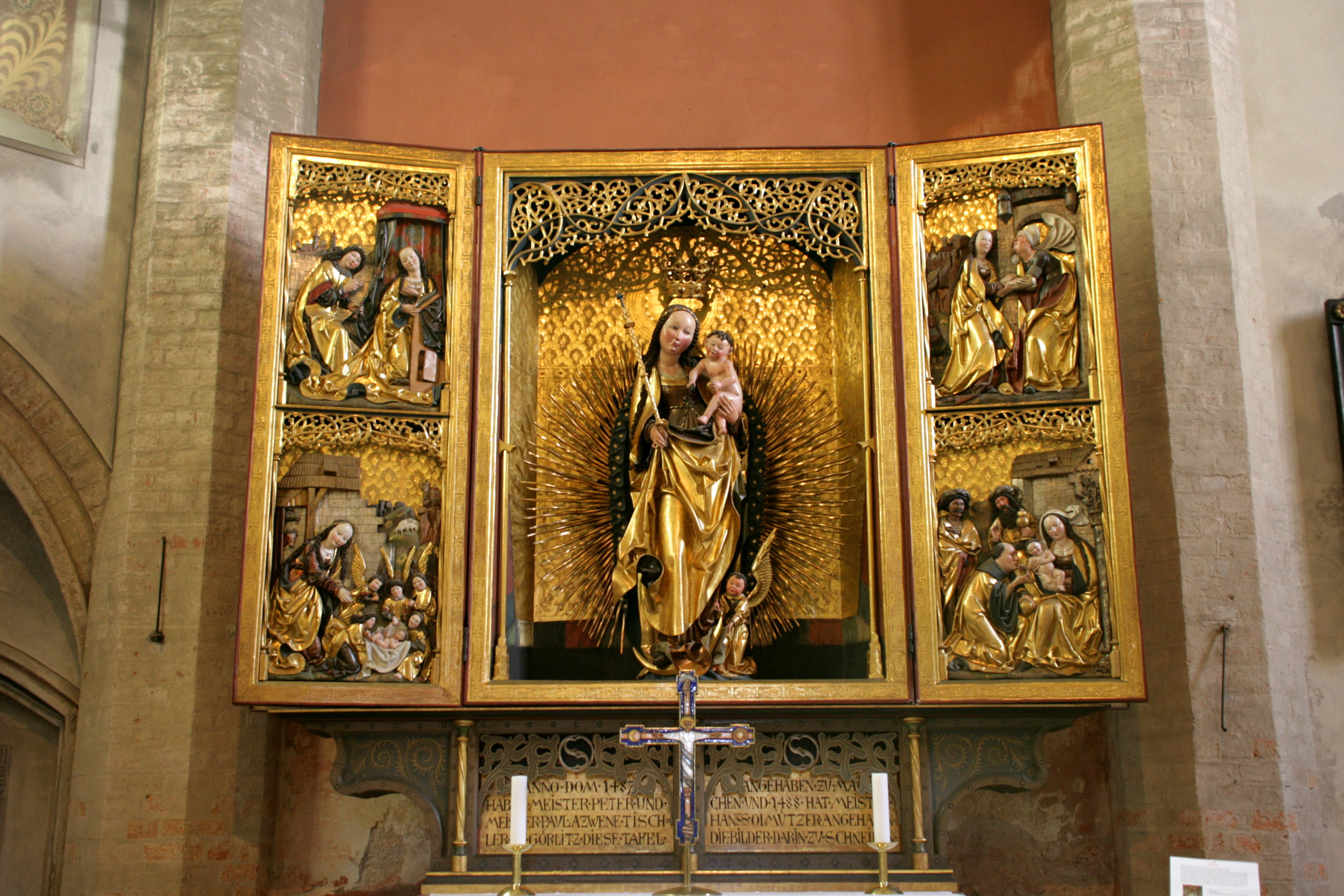
The Görlitz altarpiece

Jakob or Jakub Beinhart, Beynhard, Beynhardt or Peynhart (c. 1460 – c. 1525) was a German painter and sculptor.

== Life ==
Born in Geislingen an der Steige, he accepted citizenship of Breslau (now known as Wrocław) on 14 February 1483 and the following year he first appeared in the register of that city's master painters and sculptors guild, of which he was frequently elected elder. He owned several properties in Wrocław. His son Christoph also became a sculptor and had a workshop of his own from 1521 onwards.

Jakob trained many apprentices in his studio, including his cousins Antonius (1498), Caspar (1505) and Hans (1506). He received a large number of commissions, which led to a decline in his works' quality. His only signed hand-carved work is a sandstone figure of the Madonna and Child on the north side of the sacristy at Wrocław's St Mary Magdalene Church – it bears a signature "Jacob 1499 Beynhart".

His workshop also produced several sculpted altarpieces for Silesian churches, such as altarpieces for Ziębice and the former Franziskanerkirche in Görlitz (c. 1510), the St Luke altarpiece for St Mary Magdalene Church in Wrocław and winged altarpieces for Góra (showing the Madonna and Child, now in Poznan Cathedral), the Kreuzkirche at Steinau an der Oder (now in the Zisterzienserkirche in Mogiła near Kraków), Thiemendorf (showing the Coronation of Mary) and Görlitz's former Franziskanerkirche (the 'Altarpiece of the Golden Madonna', c. 1510). He died in Wrocław.
