= SS-Verfügungstruppe =

Predecessor of the Waffen-SS

- SS insignia worn on the right side of the helmets of SS-Verfügungstruppe.
- Active: 1934–1940
- Country: (Nazi Germany) Germany
- Allegiance: Adolf Hitler
- Branch: SS
- Type: Panzergrenadier
- Role: Close protection; Counter-insurgency; Maneuver warfare; Raiding
- Size: Division
- Garrison/HQ: Berlin
- Colors: Black, White, Red

Commanders
- Notable commanders: Paul Hausser; Felix Steiner; Sepp Dietrich

SS-Verfügungstruppe (SS-VT, lit. 'SS Dispositional Troops') was formed in 1934 as combat troops for the Nazi Party (NSDAP). On 17 August 1938 Adolf Hitler decreed that the SS-VT was neither a part of the Ordnungspolizei (order police) nor the Wehrmacht, but military-trained men at the disposal of the Führer. In time of war, the SS-VT were to be placed at the disposal of the army.

The SS-VT were involved in the German invasion of Poland in September 1939. By 1940 these military SS units had become the nucleus of the Waffen-SS.

== Formation ==
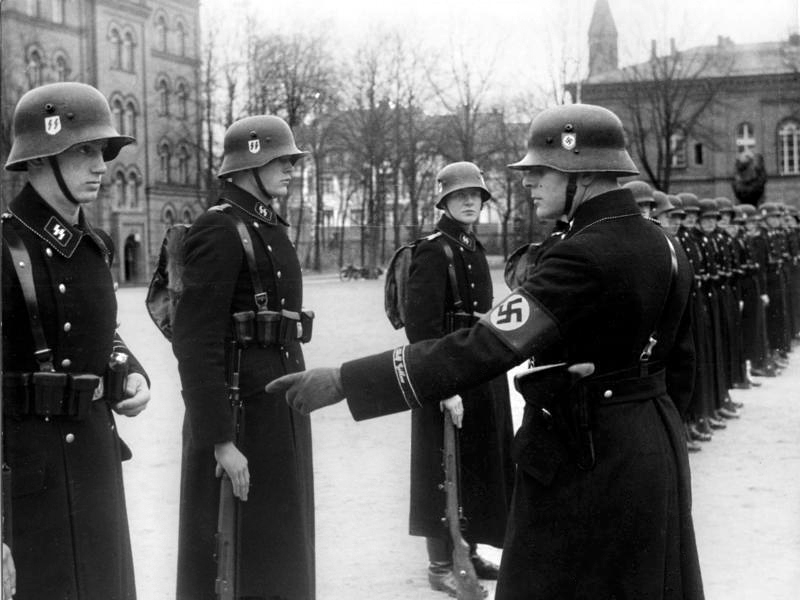
LSSAH troops undergo a drill inspection in Berlin, November 1938

The SS-VT was formed on 24 September 1934 from a merger of various Nazi and paramilitary formations such as the SS Special Detachments (SS-Sonderkommandos) and the Headquarters Guard (SS-Stabswache) units. The SS-VT consisted of three regiments, modelled on the infantry regiments of the German Army (Heer) and regulations; each regiment consisting of three infantry battalions, a motorcycle company and a mortar company. The unit was officially designated SS-Verfügungstruppe ("Dispositional troops", i.e. troops at the personal disposal of the Führer). The men were to be volunteers who had completed their service in the Reichsarbeitsdienst (RAD; Reich Labour Service).

The existence of the SS-Verfügungstruppe (SS-VT) was publicly declared on 16 March 1935 by Hitler in a speech at the Reichstag. The SS-VT had to depend on the German Army for its supply of weapons and military training, and the army also retained control of the recruiting system through local draft boards responsible for assigning conscripts to the different branches of the Wehrmacht to meet quotas set by the German High Command (Oberkommando der Wehrmacht or OKW in German). As a consequence, the SS was given the lowest priority for recruits, thereby limiting its size.

In 1936, Himmler selected former Lieutenant General Paul Hausser to be Inspector of the SS-VT with the rank of Brigadefuhrer. Hausser worked to transform the SS-VT into a credible military force that was a match for the regular army. The SS-VT trained alongside Hitler's personal bodyguard, the Leibstandarte SS Adolf Hitler (LSSAH), which had also been formed from the SS-Stabswache and SS-Sonderkommando Berlin. The LSSAH, under the command of Josef "Sepp" Dietrich, continued to serve exclusively as a personal protection unit for Hitler and an honor guard during this timeframe.

By 1937 the SS was divided into three branches: the Allgemeine-SS (General SS), the SS-Verfügungstruppe (SS-VT), and the SS-Totenkopfverbände (SS-TV), which administered the concentration camps. On 17 August 1938 Hitler decreed that the SS military formations were to be placed at the "disposal" of the army in time of war. Hitler stated, at Himmler's request, that service in the SS-VT qualified to fulfill military service obligations. Further, during wartime, units of the SS-TV would be used as reserves for the SS-VT. Over the course of the war this led to a constant flux of men between the Waffen-SS and the Nazi concentration camps.

The military formations under Himmler's command on 1 September 1939 consisted of several subgroups:

- Hitler's bodyguard unit, the Leibstandarte SS Adolf Hitler (LSSAH) under Sepp Dietrich.
- The Inspectorate of Verfügungstruppe under Paul Hausser, which commanded the Deutschland, Germania and Der Führer regiments.
- The Concentration Camps Inspectorate (Inspektion der Konzentrationslager) under Theodor Eicke, which fielded four militarized Death's-Head Standarten, comprising camp guards of the SS-Totenkopfverbände. The SS-Totenkopf Division was initially formed from concentration camp guards of the Standarten (regiments) of the SS-TV and the SS Heimwehr Danzig in October 1939. It was then folded into the Waffen-SS in August 1940. These troops wore the SS-TV skull and crossbones rather than the SS-VT "SS" runes.
- There were in addition combat-trained non-SS police units of Obergruppenführer Kurt Daluege's Ordnungspolizei, which reported to Himmler in his capacity as Chief of German Police. For the 1940 campaigns these also would be formed into a division, which would be placed under Waffen-SS control in January 1941 and merged into it in February 1942.

== Early operations ==
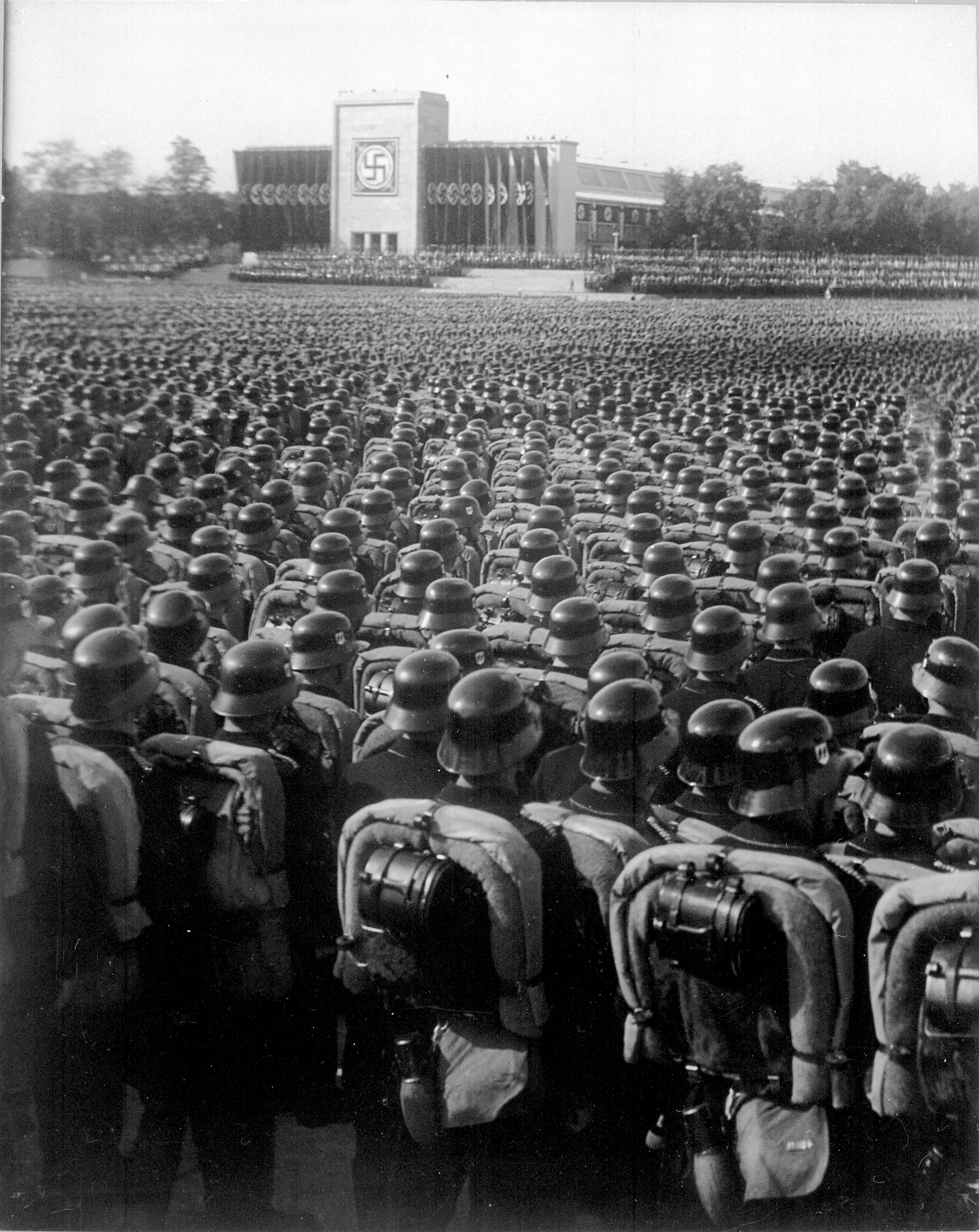
SS-VT in full marching order, 1935

Elements of the SS-VT served with the Wehrmacht during the occupation of the Sudetenland, Austria, and Czechoslovakia. For those operations, the SS-VT was under the command of the army. The SS-VT also formed an Artillery Regiment during this time-frame which was used to fill the gaps in a number of army units for those events. The SS-VT regiments Deutschland and Germania along with the Leibstandarte participated in the invasion of Poland, with Der Führer (recruited in Austria after the Anschluss) in reserve at Prague. In September 1939, a combined unit of SS-VT and Heer (army) troops conducted operations jointly as Panzer Division Kempf during the invasion of Poland. It fought alongside army units at Rozan, Modlin, Łomża and Kmiczyn. The division was disbanded near the Polish city of Nidzica on 7 October 1939.

In spite of the swift military victory over Poland in September 1939, events during the invasion of Poland raised doubts over the combat effectiveness of the SS-VT. The OKW or Oberkommando der Wehrmacht (High Command of the Armed Forces) reported that the SS-VT units took unnecessary risks and had a higher casualty rate than the army. They also stated that the SS-VT was poorly trained and its officers unsuitable for combat command. As an example, OKW noted that the Leibstandarte had to be rescued by an army regiment after becoming surrounded at Pabianice by the Poles. In its defence, the SS insisted that it had been hampered by having to fight piecemeal instead of as one formation, and was improperly equipped by the army to carry out its objectives. Himmler insisted that the SS-VT should be allowed to fight in its own formations under its own commanders, while the OKW tried to have the SS-VT disbanded altogether. Hitler was unwilling to upset either the army or Himmler, and chose a third path. He ordered that the SS-VT form its own divisions but that the divisions would be under army command.

In addition, Eicke's SS-TV field forces were not military, and during the invasion of Poland, "[t]heir...capabilities were employed instead in terrorizing the civilian population through acts that included hunting down straggling Polish soldiers, confiscating agricultural produce and livestock, and torturing and murdering large numbers of Polish political leaders, aristocrats, businessmen, priests, intellectuals, and Jews." Further, members of the Leibstandarte also committed atrocities in numerous towns, including the murder of 50 Polish Jews in Błonie and the massacre in Złoczew, where 200 civilians were machine gunned. Złoczew's children also suffered; SS men beat and murdered them, sometimes with rifle butts, crushing the skulls of toddlers. Shootings also took place in Bolesławiec, Torzeniec, Goworowo, Mława, and Włocławek.

== Development of the Waffen-SS ==
In October 1939 the SS-VT regiments Deutschland, Germania, and Der Führer were organized into the SS-Verfügungs-Division with Paul Hausser as commander. The LSSAH was expanded into a motorized regiment.

In addition, the armed but ill-trained Totenkopfstandarten, together with SS Heimwehr Danzig, were organized into the Totenkopf-Division under Eicke's command in October 1939. A further division, the Polizei-Division, was created from the Ordnungspolizei. These formations took part in combat training while under army commands in preparation for Fall Gelb against the Low Countries and France in 1940.

Elements of both the SS-VT and the LSSAH participated in the ground invasion of the Battle of the Netherlands. In the five-day campaign, the LSSAH linked up with army units and airborne troops after a number of clashes with Dutch defenders. After the surrender of Rotterdam, the LSSAH left for The Hague, which they reached on 15 May, after capturing 3,500 Dutch soldiers as prisoners of war.

On 16 May the SS Totenkopf Division was ordered to France and was attached to army divisions which formed the northern "spearhead" of attack. In France, the SS Totenkopf was involved in the only Allied tank attack in the Battle of France. On 21 May units of the British 1st Army Tank Brigade, supported by the 50th (Northumbrian) Infantry Division, took part in the Battle of Arras. The SS Totenkopf was overrun, finding their standard anti-tank gun, the 3.7 cm PaK 36, no match for the British Matilda tank.

After the Dutch surrender, the LSSAH was moved south to France. On 24 May the LSSAH, along with the SS-VT division, were positioned to hold the perimeter around Dunkirk, assisting in reduction of the size of the pocket containing the encircled British Expeditionary Force and French forces. On 27 May, a unit from the Totenkopf, the 4 Company, committed the Le Paradis massacre; 97 captured men of the 2nd Battalion Royal Norfolk Regiment were machine gunned after surrendering, with survivors finished off with bayonets. Two men survived. By 28 May the SS-Leibstandarte had taken the village of Wormhout, 10 miles (16 km) from Dunkirk. There, soldiers of the 2nd Battalion were responsible for the Wormhoudt massacre, where 80 British and French soldiers were murdered after they surrendered.

After the close of the Battle of France, the SS-VT was officially renamed the Waffen-SS, in a speech made by Adolf Hitler on 19 July 1940. Himmler also gained approval for the Waffen-SS to form its own high command, the Kommandoamt der Waffen-SS (Waffen-SS Command Office) within the SS-Führungshauptamt (FHA). It was created in August 1940, and nominally under the authority of Himmler with operational command under then SS-Gruppenführer Hans Jüttner. The Totenkopf Division, together with the independent Totenkopf-Standarten, were transferred to FHA control. Further that same month, SS chief-of-staff Gottlob Berger approached Himmler with a plan to recruit volunteers in the conquered territories from the ethnic German and Germanic populations. At first Hitler had doubts about recruiting foreigners, but he was persuaded by Himmler and Berger. He gave approval for a new division to be formed from foreign nationals with German officers.

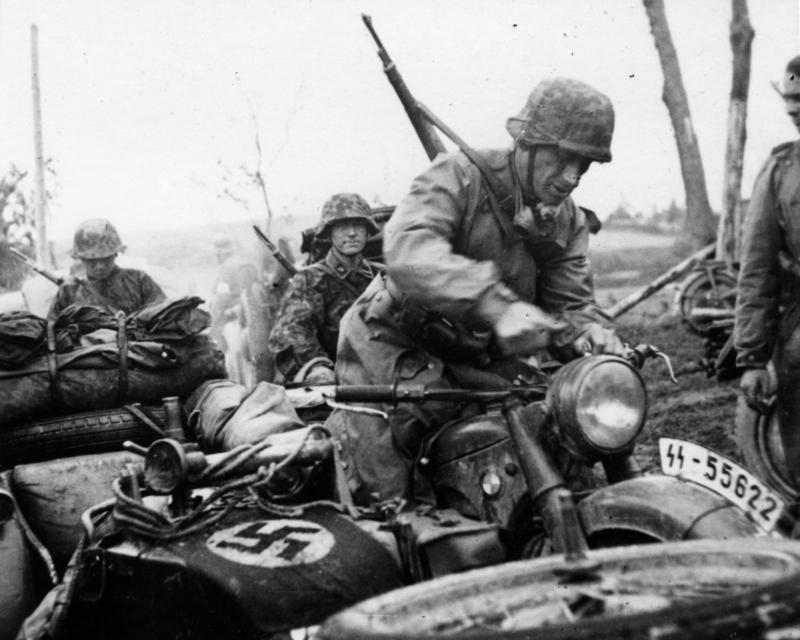
Motorcycle unit of the 3rd SS Panzer Division Totenkopf in the Soviet Union, 1941

In December 1940 the Germania Regiment was removed from the Verfügungs-Division and used to form the cadre of a new division, SS-Division Germania. It was made up of mostly "Nordic" volunteers from the newly conquered territories, Danes, Norwegians, Dutch and Flemings. By the start of 1941, Germania was renamed Wiking, with command given to then Brigadeführer Felix Steiner, the former commander of the SS-VT regiment Deutschland. The Verfügungs-Division was also renamed Reich (in 1942 Das Reich). In addition, the Polizei division was brought under Waffen-SS administration. The Leibstandarte was also expanded to a division for Operation Barbarossa.

When the Waffen-SS divisions were assigned numbers much later in the war these first formations, Leibstandarte, Das Reich, Totenkopf, Polizei and Wiking, were recognized as SS divisions 1 through 5.
