= Battles of Nabróż =

- Part of the Polish–Ukrainian conflict, Massacres of Poles in Volhynia and Eastern Galicia and Eastern Front of World War II
Date	4–19 May 1944
Location	Nabróż, Lublin Voivodeship
Result	Ukrainian victory (Note: 1st attack – Polish victory 2nd attack – Polish victory 3rd attack - Ukrainian victory)

Belligerents
Ukrainian Insurgent Army	Home Army; Peasant Battalions

Commanders and leaders
Unknown	Jan Opiełka

Strength
Unknown	Unknown

Casualties and losses
first and second attack: unknown third attack: 30 killed 30 wounded	first and second attack: unknown third attack: 15–46 killed
- 30–100 ethnic Polish civilians murdered (Note: German claim: 100 Poles murdered)

The Battles of Nabróż took place between the Ukrainian Insurgent Army and the Home Army in the Lublin Voivodeship, in Nabróż and its vicinity, May 1944, resulting in UPA success.

== Prelude ==
After a number of UPA attacks in the Lublin Voivodeship, Polish leadership was politically divided. AK commanders were blamed for heavy losses and failing to stop the Ukrainian nationalists. However, this divide only worsened the situation for ethnic Poles. Polish partisan forces made attempts to appeal to the local population. Despite this, the Ukrainian nationalists continued their attacks.

== Battles ==
=== Initial attack 4-5 May ===
First Attack on Nabróż
- Part of Polish–Ukrainian conflict (1939–1947)
Date	4–5 May 1944
Location	Nabróż
Result	Polish victory

Belligerents
Ukrainian Insurgent Army	Home Army

UPA launched an attack on Nabróż, the attack was repulsed and the settlement was damaged. UPA didn't make further attempts to capture Nabróż at this time, with the clashes continuing in other settlements of Tomaszów and Hrubieszów Counties instead.

=== Attack 17 May ===
Second Attack on Nabróż
- Part of Polish–Ukrainian conflict (1939–1947)
Date	17 May 1944
Location	Nabróż
Result	Polish victory

Belligerents
Ukrainian Insurgent Army	Home Army

Commanders and leaders
Maryan Lukasevych	Jan Opiełka

On May 17, 1944, five UPA companies attacked the village of Nabróż, which was an important defense link in the Polish defensive line against Ukrainian nationalists. The attack was repelled by Polish partisans led by, among others, by Senior Sergeant Jan Opiełka ("Arab"). Due to the threat, the majority of the Polish population was evacuated beyond the Huczwa River.

=== Final attack 18-19 May ===
Third Attack on Nabróż
- Part of Polish–Ukrainian conflict (1939–1947)
Date	18–19 May 1944
Location	Nabróż
Result	Ukrainian victory

Belligerents
Ukrainian Insurgent Army	Peasant Battalions; Home Army

Commanders and leaders
Maryan Lukasevych	Jan Opiełka

UPA liquated many settlements around Nabróż. UPA renewed their attacks on this settlement. Heavy fighting took place in and outside Nabróż, which was initially developing in Polish favour. The situation was saved by the UPA reinforcements, which turned the tide of this clash. The Ukrainian side estimated Polish losses at 46 killed and several captured, Polish side estimated their losses at 12–15 killed, while UPA suffered 2 killed and 11 wounded. Other sources estimate that Poles lost 15 killed, while UPA suffered losses of about 30 dead and as many wounded.

== Aftermath ==
The first two attacks ended in a victory for the Poles, but as a result of final attack, Polish forces retreated behind the Huczwa River. Fighting for Nabróż ended in Ukrainian victory. Polish-Ukrainian clashes continued in other areas and reached its peak at Narol.

== Bibliography ==
- Zajączkowski, Mariusz (2015). Ukraińskie podziemie na Lubelszczyźnie w okresie okupacji niemieckiej 1939-1944. Instytut Pamięci Narodowej, IPN. ISBN 978-83-7629-769-9.
