= Machnówek =

- Village
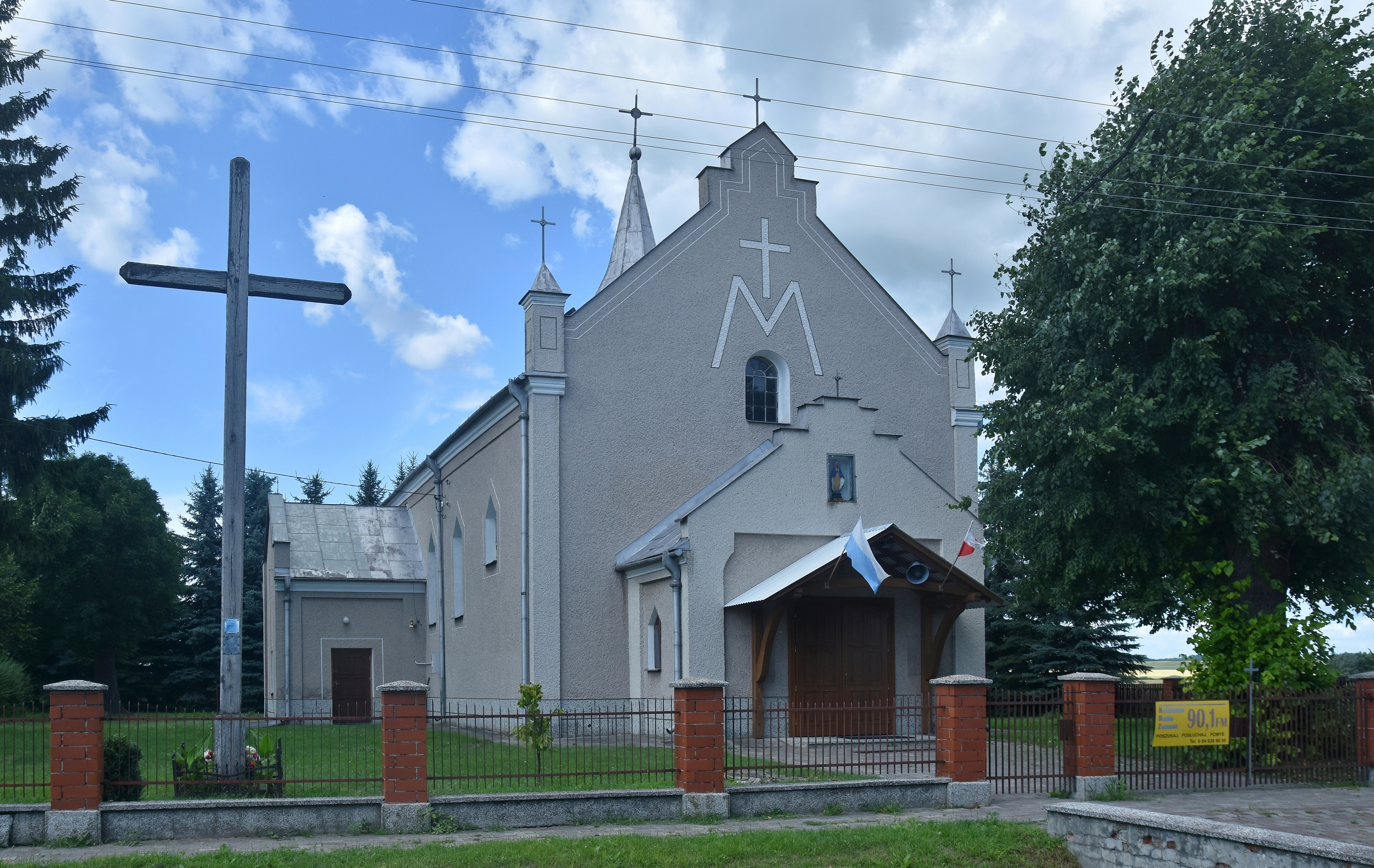
- The parish church of the Blessed Virgin Mary, Queen of Poland

- Location within Poland
- Coordinates: 50°24′54″N 23°54′21″E
- Country: Poland
- Voivodeship: Lublin
- County: Tomaszów
- Gmina: Ulhówek
- Population: 170

Machnówek [maxˈnuvɛk] is a village in the administrative district of Gmina Ulhówek, within Tomaszów County, Lublin Voivodeship, in eastern Poland, close to the border with Ukraine.
