= Kmiczyn-Kolonia =

- Village
- Location within Poland
- Coordinates: 50°33′8″N 23°45′46″E
- Country: Poland
- Voivodeship: Lublin
- County: Tomaszów
- Gmina: Łaszczów

Kmiczyn-Kolonia [ˈkmit͡ʂɨn kɔˈlɔɲa] is a village in the administrative district of Gmina Łaszczów, within Tomaszów County, Lublin Voivodeship, in eastern Poland.
