= Sidorówka, Lublin Voivodeship =

Sidorówka
- Village
- Location within Poland
- Coordinates: 50°26′39″N 23°44′36″E
- Country: Poland
- Voivodeship: Lublin
- County: Tomaszów
- Gmina: Ulhówek

Sidorówka [ɕidɔˈrufka] is a village in the administrative district of Gmina Ulhówek, within Tomaszów County, Lublin Voivodeship, in eastern Poland, close to the border with Ukraine.
