= Tarnoszyn =

- Village
- Location within Poland
- Coordinates: 50°25′21″N 23°47′28″E
- Country: Poland
- Voivodeship: Lublin
- County: Tomaszów
- Gmina: Ulhówek
- Population: 530

Tarnoszyn [tarˈnɔʂɨn] is a village in the administrative district of Gmina Ulhówek, within Tomaszów County, Lublin Voivodeship, in eastern Poland, close to the border with Ukraine.
