= Wasylów, Gmina Ulhówek =

Wasylów
- Village
- Location within Poland
- Coordinates: 50°26′13″N 23°53′44″E
- Country: Poland
- Voivodeship: Lublin
- County: Tomaszów
- Gmina: Ulhówek

Wasylów [vaˈsɨluf] is a village in the administrative district of Gmina Ulhówek, within Tomaszów County, Lublin Voivodeship, in eastern Poland, close to the border with Ukraine. The village is located in the historical region Galicia.
