= Pieniany =

- Village
- Location within Poland
- Coordinates: 50°29′N 23°41′E
- Country: Poland
- Voivodeship: Lublin
- County: Tomaszów
- Gmina: Łaszczów

Pieniany [pjɛˈɲanɨ] is a village in the administrative district of Gmina Łaszczów, within Tomaszów County, Lublin Voivodeship, in eastern Poland.
