= Gmina Łaszczów =

Gmina Łaszczów Łaszczów Commune
- Gmina
- Coat of arms
- Interactive map of Gmina Łaszczów
- Coordinates (Łaszczów): 50°32′N 23°44′E
- Country: Poland
- Voivodeship: Lublin
- County: Tomaszów
- Seat: Łaszczów

Area
  - Total: 128.23 km^{2} (49.51 sq mi)

Population (2013)
  - Total: 6,406
  - Density: 49.96/km^{2} (129.4/sq mi)
  - Urban: 2,187
  - Rural: 4,219
- Website: website

Gmina Łaszczów is an urban-rural gmina (administrative district) in Tomaszów County, Lublin Voivodeship, in eastern Poland. Its seat is the town of Łaszczów, which lies approximately 25 kilometres (16 mi) east of Tomaszów Lubelski and 114 km (71 mi) south-east of the regional capital Lublin.

The gmina covers an area of 128.23 square kilometres (49.5 sq mi), and as of 2006 its total population is 6,503 (6,406 in 2013). Before 1 January 2010 (when Łaszczów became a town) it was classed as a rural gmina.

== Villages ==
As well as the town of Łaszczów, Gmina Łaszczów contains the villages and settlements of Czerkasy, Dobużek, Dobużek-Kolonia, Domaniż, Hopkie, Hopkie-Kolonia, Kmiczyn, Kmiczyn-Kolonia, Łaszczów-Kolonia, Małoniż, Muratyn, Muratyn-Kolonia, Nabróż, Nabróż-Kolonia, Nadolce, Pieniany, Pieniany-Kolonia, Podlodów, Pukarzów, Pukarzów-Kolonia, Ratyczów, Steniatyn, Steniatyn-Kolonia, Wólka Pukarzowska, Zimno and Zimno-Kolonia.

== Neighbouring gminas ==
Gmina Łaszczów is bordered by the gminas of Jarczów, Mircze, Rachanie, Telatyn, Tyszowce and Ulhówek.
