= Hubinek =

- Village
- Location within Poland
- Coordinates: 50°26′49″N 23°42′6″E
- Country: Poland
- Voivodeship: Lublin
- County: Tomaszów
- Gmina: Ulhówek
- Population: 280

Hubinek [xuˈbinɛk] is a village in the administrative district of Gmina Ulhówek, within Tomaszów County, Lublin Voivodeship, in eastern Poland, close to the border with Ukraine. The village is located in the historical region of Galicia.
