= Domaniż =

- Village
- Location within Poland
- Coordinates: 50°32′N 23°44′E
- Country: Poland
- Voivodeship: Lublin
- County: Tomaszów
- Gmina: Łaszczów

Domaniż [dɔˈmaniʂ] is a village in the administrative district of Gmina Łaszczów, within Tomaszów County, Lublin Voivodeship, in eastern Poland.
