= Łaszczów =

- Town
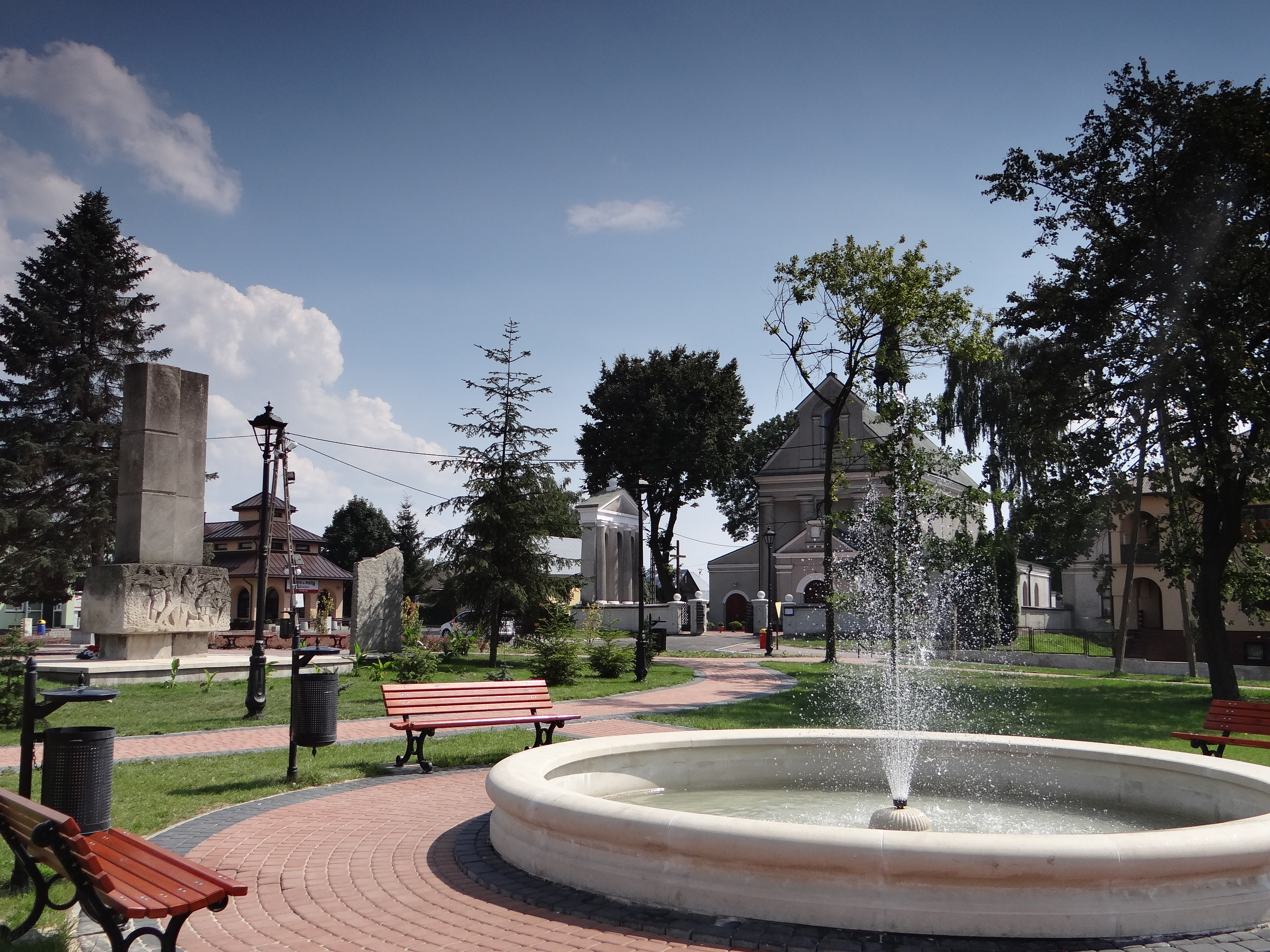
- Town center

- Coat of arms

- Location within Poland
- Coordinates: 50°32′N 23°44′E
- Country: Poland
- Voivodeship: Lublin
- County: Tomaszów
- Gmina: Łaszczów

Population
  - Total: 2,341
- Time zone: UTC+1 (CET)
  - Summer (DST): UTC+2 (CEST)
- Vehicle registration: LTM
- Website: Website

Łaszczów is a town in Tomaszów County, Lublin Voivodeship, in eastern Poland. It is the seat of the Gmina (administrative district) called Gmina Łaszczów.

The town has a population of 2,341.

== History ==
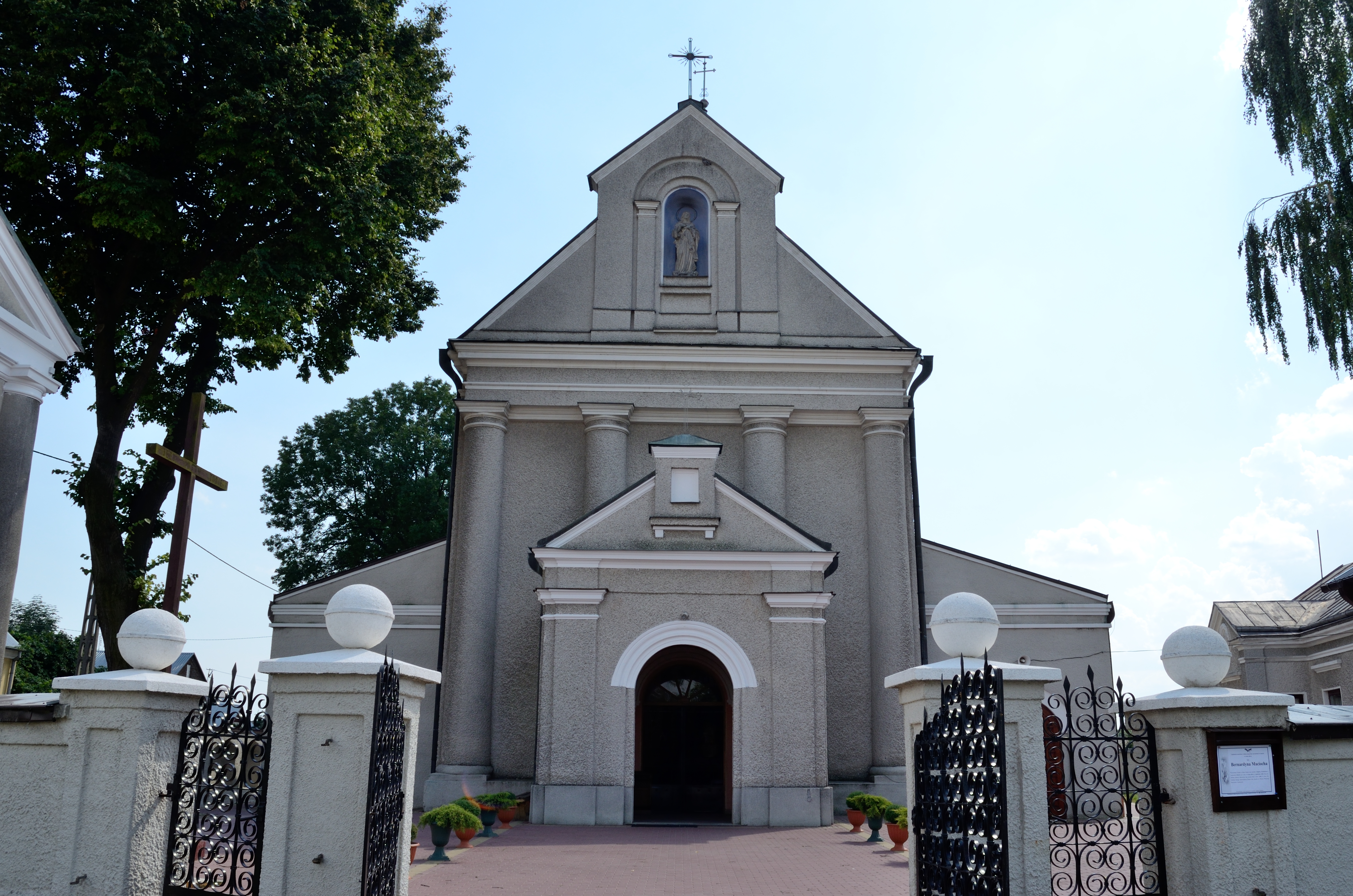
Baroque Saints Peter and Paul church

The history of Łaszczów dates back to 1549, when King Sigismund II Augustus allowed Podkomorzy of Bełz and Castellan of Horodło Aleksander Łaszcz to change his own village of Domaniz into a town of Prawda (named after Prawdzic coat of arms). The royal bill was signed on December 22, 1549, at Piotrków Trybunalski.

The town of Prawda was founded next to the village. By the 1570s, its name was changed into Łaszczów (after the Łaszcz family). Łaszczów had Magdeburg rights, and during the Protestant Reformation, became important center of the Polish Brethren. It had a prayer house and a printing shop, which operated until 1603. Łaszczów was a regional trade and business center, but its prosperity ended after Swedish invasion of Poland (1655–1660).

In 1702, the town was burnt by Swedes, during the Great Northern War, and in 1745, Józef Łaszcz, owner of Łaszczów, initiated construction of a church and Jesuit collegium. In 1754, Łaszczów burnt in a great fire, after which its owners ordered residents to build brick houses.

Following the Third Partition of Poland in 1795, Trawniki was annexed by Austria. After the Polish victory in the Austro-Polish War of 1809 it was regained by Poles and included within the short-lived Duchy of Warsaw. Following the duchy's dissolution in 1815, Łaszczów became part of Russian-controlled Congress Poland. Town rights were revoked by the Tsarist administration in 1870 as part of anti-Polish repressions following the unsuccessful Polish January Uprising. By 1902, its population grew to 2,600, with Jews in the majority. In 1914, during World War I, heavy Russian – Austrian fighting took place in the area, and in 1915, Austrians built narrow gauge railroad from Uhnów to Włodzimierz Wołyński, via Łaszczów.

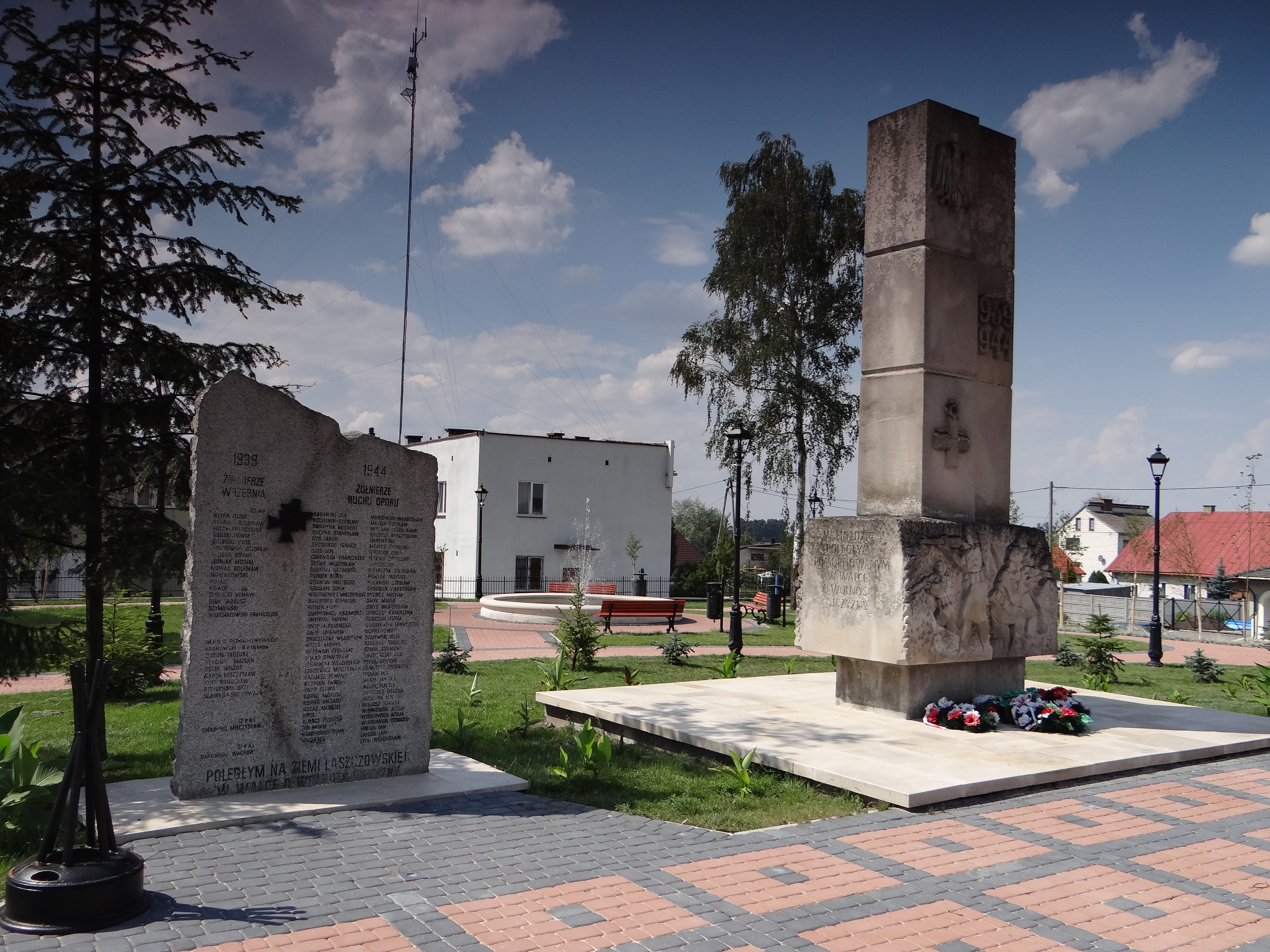
Memorial to victims of World War II

During the Invasion of Poland by the Germans in World War II, Łaszczów saw Polish–German fighting. Afterwards it was occupied by Germany until 1944. It was the site of two massacres of Poles, the first committed by Ukrainian nationalists on June 21, 1941, with 30 victims, and the second committed by the German Gestapo and an ethnic Ukrainian SS unit on December 25, 1942 with 75 victims. The 1,500–2,500 Jews from the town were transported to the Belzec extermination camp on May 17, 1942. In June 1944, Łaszczów was burnt by the Ukrainian Insurgent Army.

Municipal rights were restored on 1 January 2010.
