= Krzewica, Gmina Ulhówek =

Krzewica
- Village
- Location within Poland
- Coordinates: 50°26′27″N 23°51′2″E
- Country: Poland
- Voivodeship: Lublin
- County: Tomaszów
- Gmina: Ulhówek
- Population (approx.): 200

Krzewica [kʂɛˈvit͡sa] is a village in the administrative district of Gmina Ulhówek, within Tomaszów County, Lublin Voivodeship, in eastern Poland, close to the border with Ukraine. The village is located in the historical region Galicia.
