= Szczepiatyn =

- Village
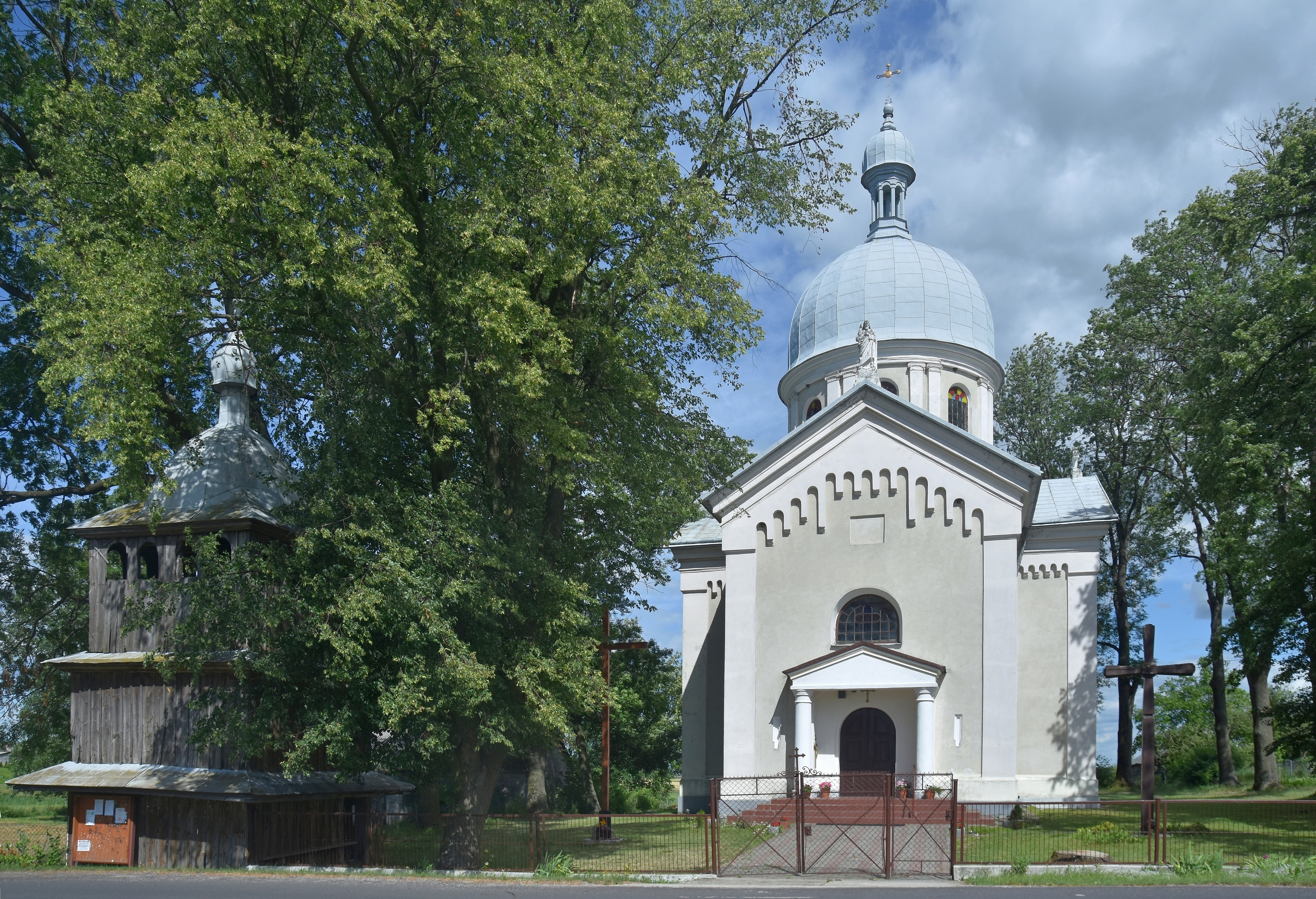
- Holy Trinity church in Szczepiatyn

- Location within Poland
- Coordinates: 50°25′32″N 23°49′12″E
- Country: Poland
- Voivodeship: Lublin
- County: Tomaszów
- Gmina: Ulhówek

Population
  - Total: 210
- Time zone: UTC+1 (CET)
  - Summer (DST): UTC+2 (CEST)
- Vehicle registration: LTM

Szczepiatyn [ʂt͡ʂɛˈpjatɨn] is a village in the administrative district of Gmina Ulhówek, within Tomaszów County, Lublin Voivodeship, in south-eastern Poland, close to the border with Ukraine.

The village had a population of 256 people according to the 2011 census.

== History ==
Following the German-Soviet invasion of Poland, which started World War II in September 1939, the village was occupied by Germany until 1944. On the night of 26–27 March 1944, the Ukrainian Insurgent Army attacked the village and carried out a massacre of 21 Poles, including children as young as six. Many inhabitants managed to flee the massacre.
