= Zimno-Kolonia =

- Village
- Location within Poland
- Coordinates: 50°30′29″N 23°42′10″E
- Country: Poland
- Voivodeship: Lublin
- County: Tomaszów
- Gmina: Łaszczów
- Time zone: UTC+1 (CET)
  - Summer (DST): UTC+2 (CEST)
- Vehicle registration: LTM

Zimno-Kolonia [ˈʑimnɔ kɔˈlɔɲa] is a village in the administrative district of Gmina Łaszczów, within Tomaszów County, Lublin Voivodeship, in south-eastern Poland.
