= Gmina Ulhówek =

Gmina Ulhówek Ulhówek Commune
- Gmina
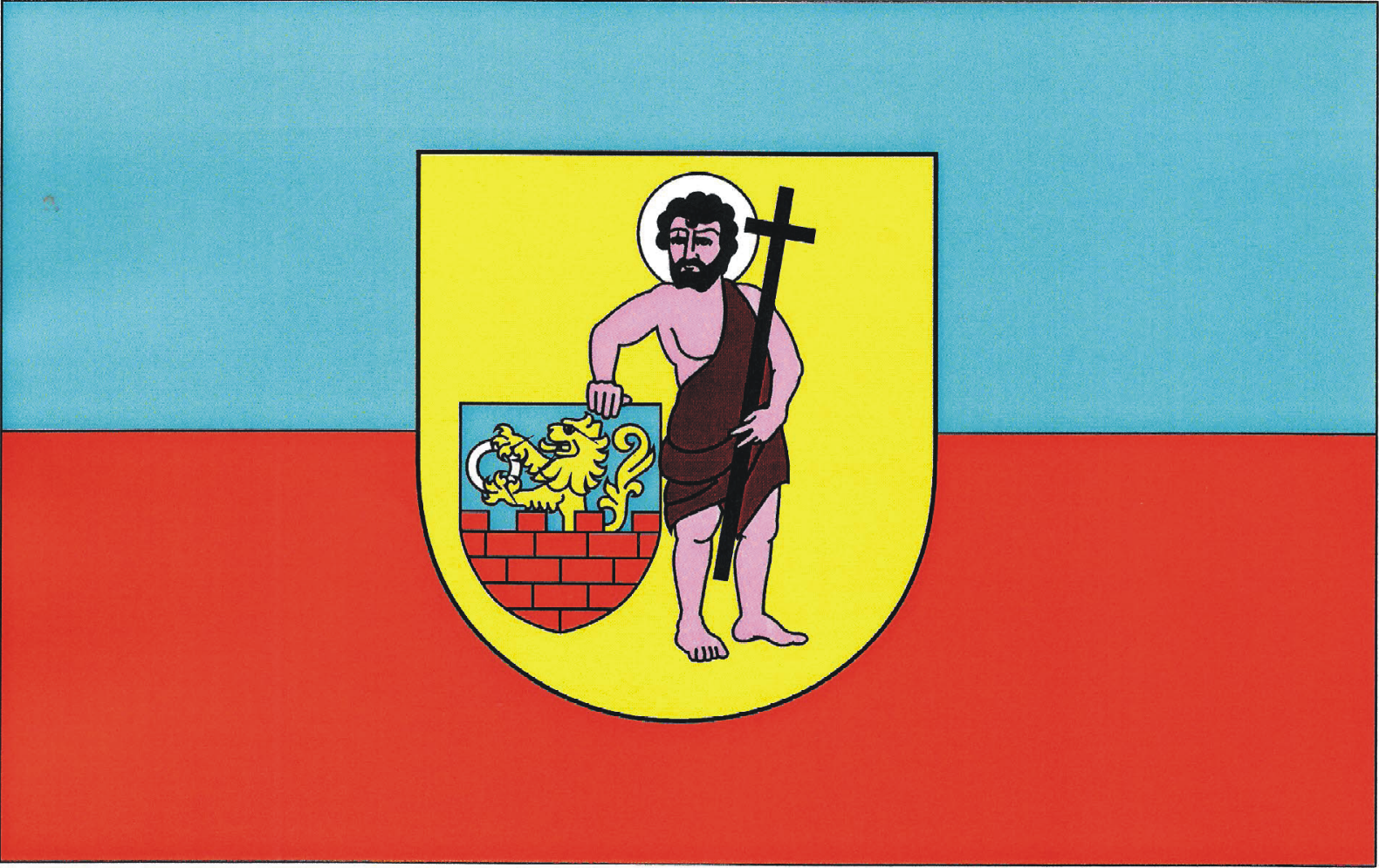
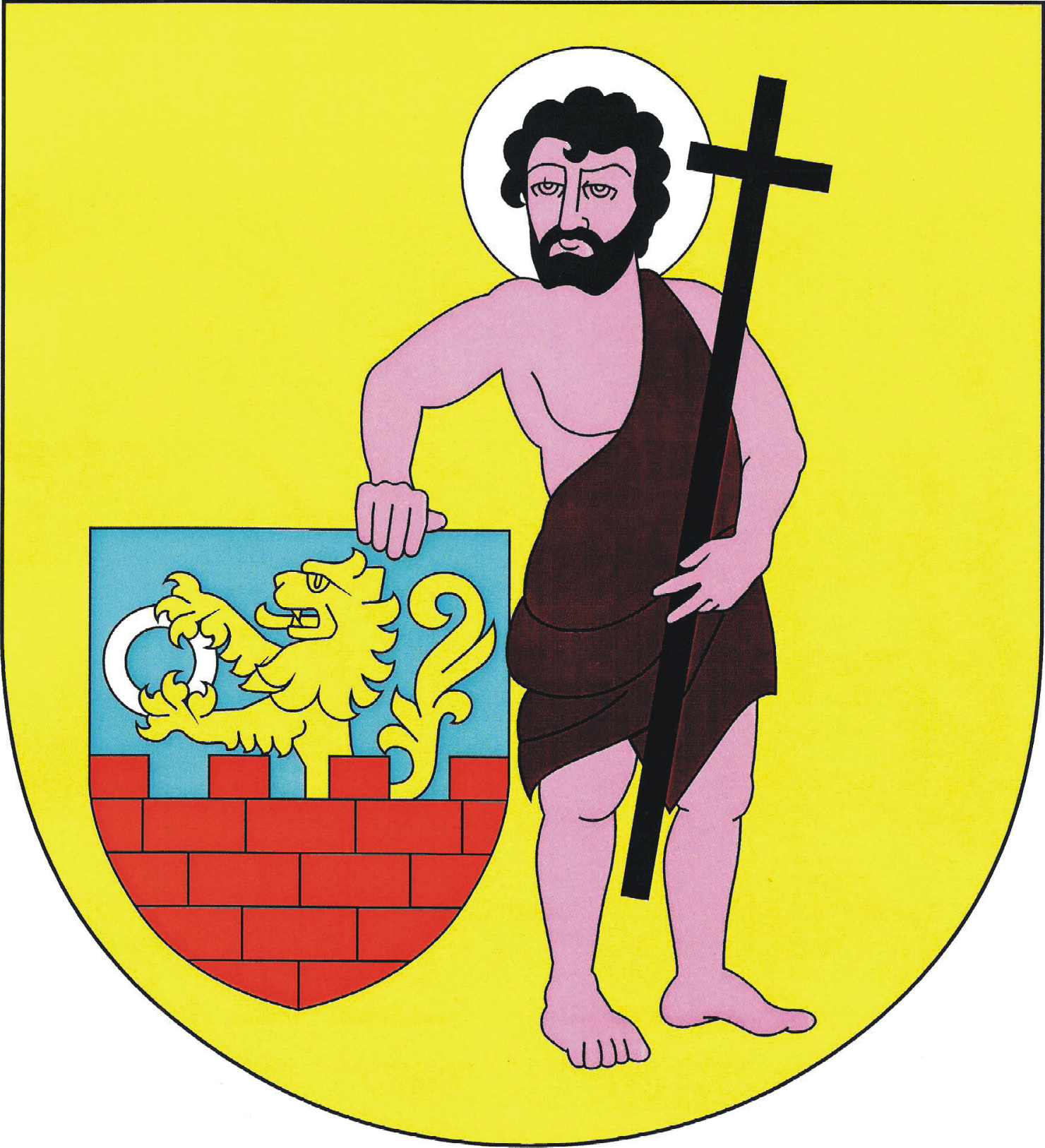
- Flag Coat of arms
- Interactive map of Gmina Ulhówek
- Coordinates (Ulhówek): 50°26′59″N 23°46′47″E
- Country: Poland
- Voivodeship: Lublin
- County: Tomaszów
- Seat: Ulhówek

Area
  - Total: 146.55 km^{2} (56.58 sq mi)

Population (2013)
  - Total: 4,983
  - Density: 34.00/km^{2} (88.06/sq mi)
- Website: http://www.ulhowek.gmina.woi.lublin.pl/

Gmina Ulhówek is a rural gmina (administrative district) in Tomaszów County, Lublin Voivodeship, in eastern Poland, on the border with Ukraine. Its seat is the village of Ulhówek, which lies approximately 26 kilometres (16 mi) east of Tomaszów Lubelski and 123 km (76 mi) south-east of the regional capital Lublin.

The gmina covers an area of 146.55 square kilometres (56.6 sq mi), and as of 2006 its total population is 5,203 (4,983 in 2013).

== Villages ==
Gmina Ulhówek contains the villages and settlements of Budynin, Dębina, Dyniska, Hubinek, Kolonia Hubinek, Kolonia Rzeplin, Kolonia Ulhówek, Korczmin, Korea, Krzewica, Machnówek, Magdalenka, Mogiła, Oserdów, Ostrów, Pod Brodem, Podlipy, Podlodów, Posadów, Przymiarki, Rechulówka, Rokitno, Rzeczyca, Rzeplin, Sidorówka, Szczepiatyn, Tarnoszyn, Turyna, Ulhówek, Wandzin, Wasylów, Wasylów Wielki and Żerniki.

== Neighbouring gminas ==
Gmina Ulhówek is bordered by the gminas of Dołhobyczów, Jarczów, Łaszczów, Lubycza Królewska and Telatyn. It also borders Ukraine.
