= Ostrów, Gmina Ulhówek =

Ostrów
- Village
- Location within Poland
- Coordinates: 50°29′5″N 23°47′3″E
- Country: Poland
- Voivodeship: Lublin
- County: Tomaszów
- Gmina: Ulhówek

Ostrów [ˈɔstruf] is a village in the administrative district of Gmina Ulhówek, within Tomaszów County, Lublin Voivodeship, in eastern Poland, close to the border with Ukraine.
