= Małoniż =

- Village
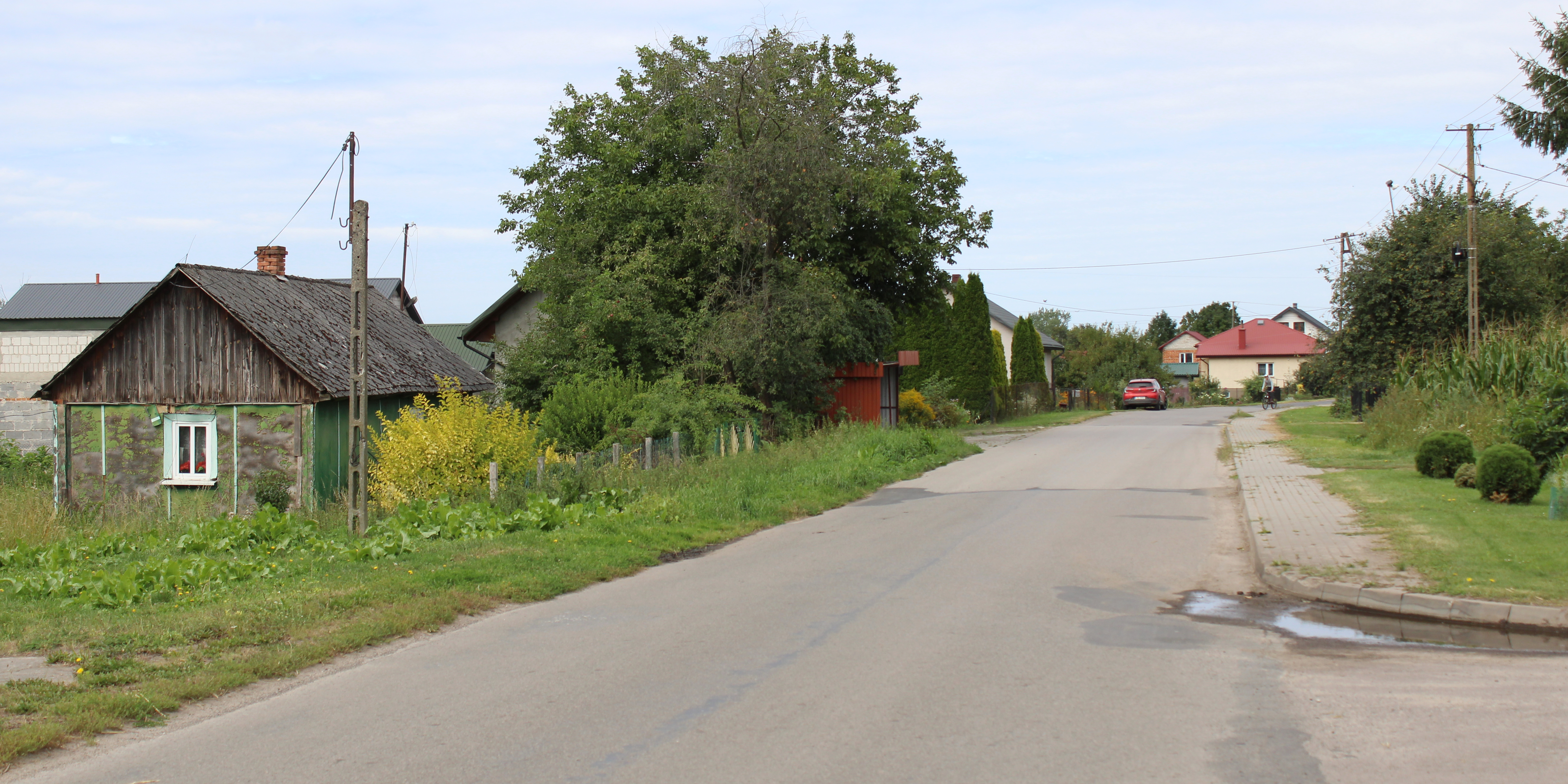

- Location within Poland
- Coordinates: 50°32′N 23°41′E
- Country: Poland
- Voivodeship: Lublin
- County: Tomaszów
- Gmina: Łaszczów
- Time zone: UTC+1 (CET)
  - Summer (DST): UTC+2 (CEST)
- Vehicle registration: LTM

Małoniż [maˈwɔniʂ] is a village in the administrative district of Gmina Łaszczów, within Tomaszów County, Lublin Voivodeship, in south-eastern Poland.
