= Oserdów =

- Village
- Location within Poland
- Coordinates: 50°25′20″N 23°59′8″E
- Country: Poland
- Voivodeship: Lublin
- County: Tomaszów
- Gmina: Ulhówek
- Population: 35

Oserdów [ɔˈsɛrduf] is a village in the administrative district of Gmina Ulhówek, within Tomaszów County, Lublin Voivodeship, in eastern Poland, close to the border with Ukraine. The village is located in the historical region Galicia.

== History ==
=== 2024 airspace violation ===
On 24 March 2024, Russia launched a major airstrike attack against Ukraine, involving at least 20 missiles. At 4:23 am, one missile launched against Ukraine crossed the Poland–Ukraine border near the town and remained in Polish airspace for 39 seconds, travelling 1–2 kilometres (0.62–1.24 mi) before crossing back into Ukraine.
