= Ulhówek =

- Village
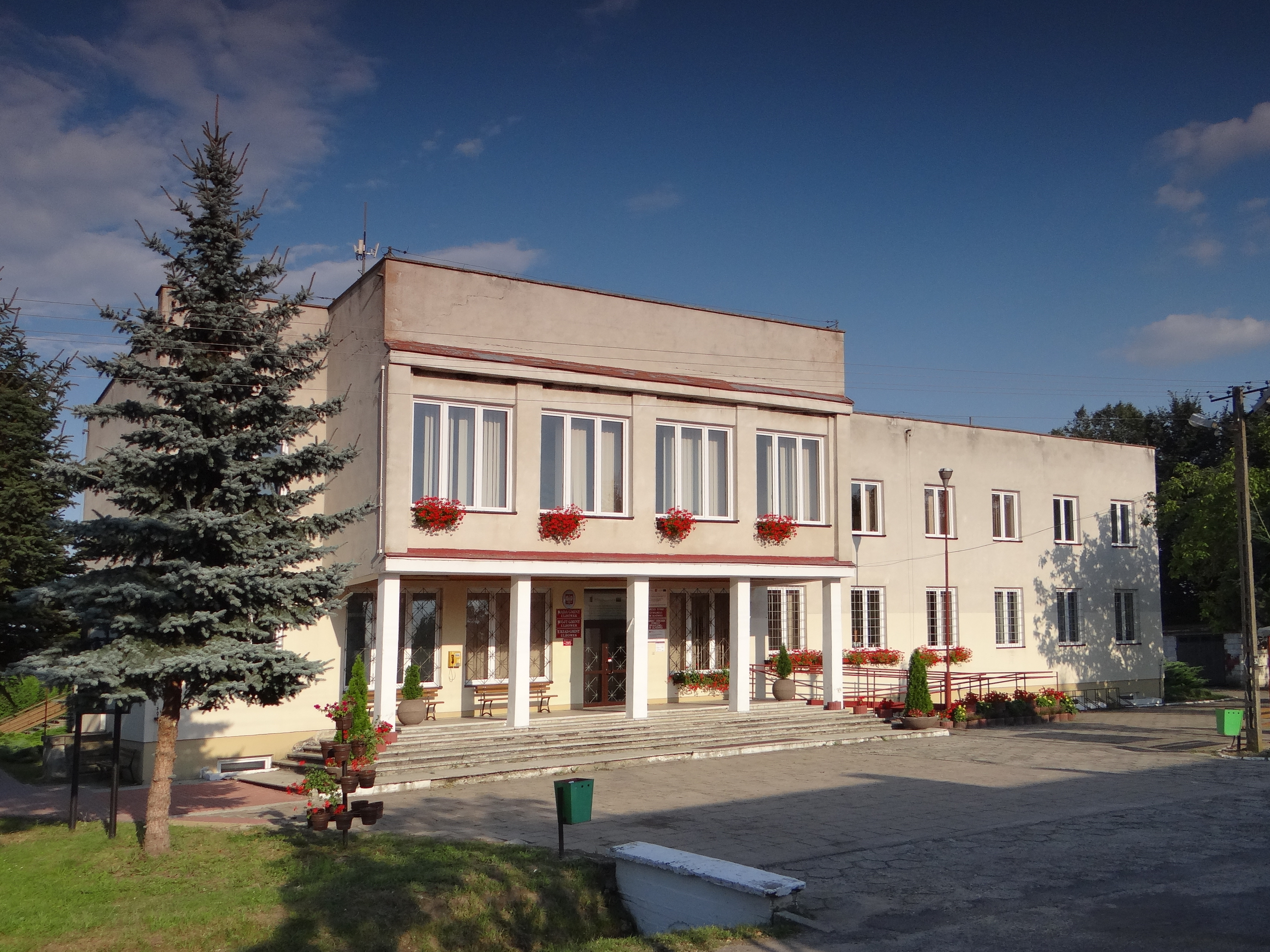
- Gmina Ulhówek administration building

- Location within Poland
- Coordinates: 50°26′59″N 23°46′47″E
- Country: Poland
- Voivodeship: Lublin
- County: Tomaszów
- Gmina: Ulhówek

Population
  - Total: 1,262
- Website: http://www.nevulhowek.republika.pl

Ulhówek [ulˈxuvɛk] is a village in Tomaszów County, Lublin Voivodeship, in eastern Poland, close to the border with Ukraine. It is the seat of the gmina (administrative district) called Gmina Ulhówek. The village is located in the historical region Galicia.
