= Pod Brodem =

- Village
- Location within Poland
- Coordinates: 50°26′0″N 23°45′39″E
- Country: Poland
- Voivodeship: Lublin
- County: Tomaszów
- Gmina: Ulhówek

Pod Brodem [ˈpɔt ˈbrɔdɛm] is a village in the administrative district of Gmina Ulhówek, within Tomaszów County, Lublin Voivodeship, in eastern Poland (near the Polish-Ukrainian border).
