= Wasylów Wielki =

- Village
- Location within Poland
- Coordinates: 50°27′8″N 23°53′32″E
- Country: Poland
- Voivodeship: Lublin
- County: Tomaszów
- Gmina: Ulhówek
- Population: 510

Wasylów Wielki (Polish pronunciation: [vaˈsɨluv ˈvjɛlkʲi]) is a village in the administrative district of Gmina Ulhówek, within Tomaszów County, Lublin Voivodeship, in eastern Poland, close to the border with Ukraine.
