= Przymiarki, Gmina Ulhówek =

Przymiarki
- Village
- Location within Poland
- Coordinates: 50°25′5″N 23°46′31″E
- Country: Poland
- Voivodeship: Lublin
- County: Tomaszów
- Gmina: Ulhówek

Przymiarki [pʂɨˈmjarki] is a village in the administrative district of Gmina Ulhówek, within Tomaszów County, Lublin Voivodeship, in eastern Poland, close to the border with Ukraine.
