= Rokitno, Gmina Ulhówek =

Rokitno
- Village
- Location within Poland
- Coordinates: 50°28′33″N 23°47′10″E
- Country: Poland
- Voivodeship: Lublin
- County: Tomaszów
- Gmina: Ulhówek
- Population: 260

Rokitno [rɔˈkitnɔ] is a village in the administrative district of Gmina Ulhówek, within Tomaszów County, Lublin Voivodeship, in eastern Poland, close to the border with Ukraine.
