= Korczmin =

- Village
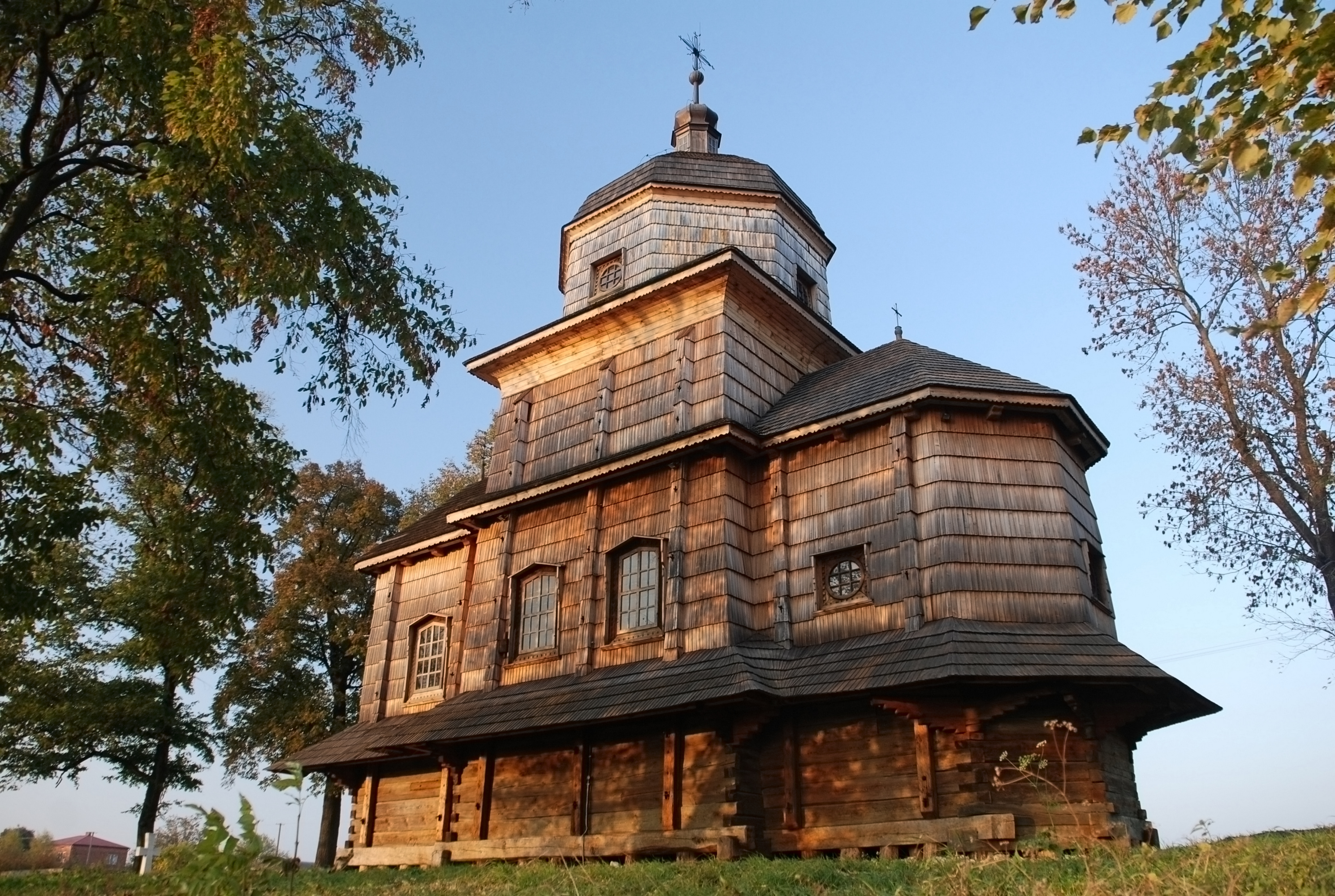
- Greek Catholic Church of the Epiphany

- Location within Poland
- Coordinates: 50°25′5″N 23°52′40″E
- Country: Poland
- Voivodeship: Lublin
- County: Tomaszów
- Gmina: Ulhówek

Population
  - Total: 340

Korczmin [ˈkɔrt͡ʂmin] is a village in the administrative district of Gmina Ulhówek, within Tomaszów County, Lublin Voivodeship, in eastern Poland, close to the border with Ukraine.
