= Muratyn-Kolonia =

- Village
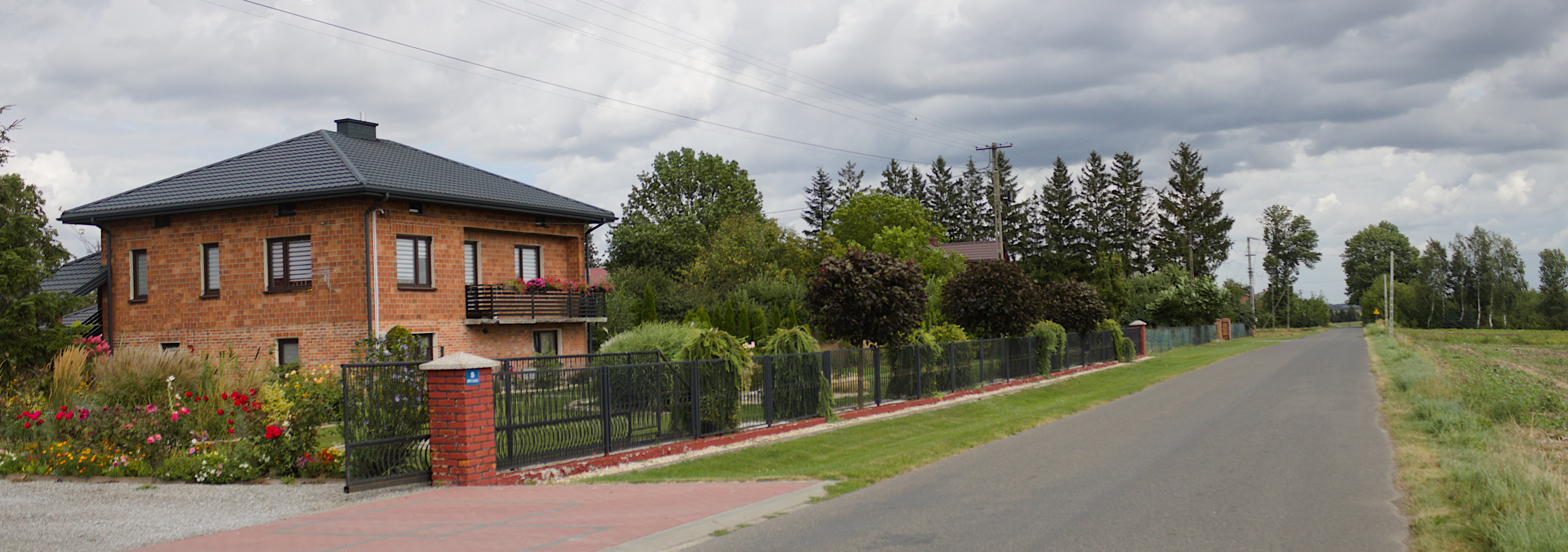

- Location within Poland
- Coordinates: 50°33′57″N 23°40′06″E
- Country: Poland
- Voivodeship: Lublin
- County: Tomaszów
- Gmina: Łaszczów
- Time zone: UTC+1 (CET)
  - Summer (DST): UTC+2 (CEST)
- Vehicle registration: LTM

Muratyn-Kolonia [muˈratɨn kɔˈlɔɲa] is a village in the administrative district of Gmina Łaszczów, within Tomaszów County, Lublin Voivodeship, in south-eastern Poland.
