= Magdalenka, Lublin Voivodeship =

Magdalenka
- Village
- Location within Poland
- Coordinates: 50°25′19″N 23°45′42″E
- Country: Poland
- Voivodeship: Lublin
- County: Tomaszów
- Gmina: Ulhówek
- Population: 270

Magdalenka [maɡdaˈlɛŋka] is a village in the administrative district of Gmina Ulhówek, within Tomaszów County, Lublin Voivodeship, in eastern Poland, close to the border with Ukraine.
