= Podlipy =

- Village
- Location within Poland
- Coordinates: 50°24′44″N 23°42′59″E
- Country: Poland
- Voivodeship: Lublin
- County: Tomaszów
- Gmina: Ulhówek

Podlipy [pɔdˈlipɨ] is a village in the administrative district of Gmina Ulhówek, within Tomaszów County, Lublin Voivodeship, in eastern Poland, close to the border with Ukraine.
