= Budynin =

- Village
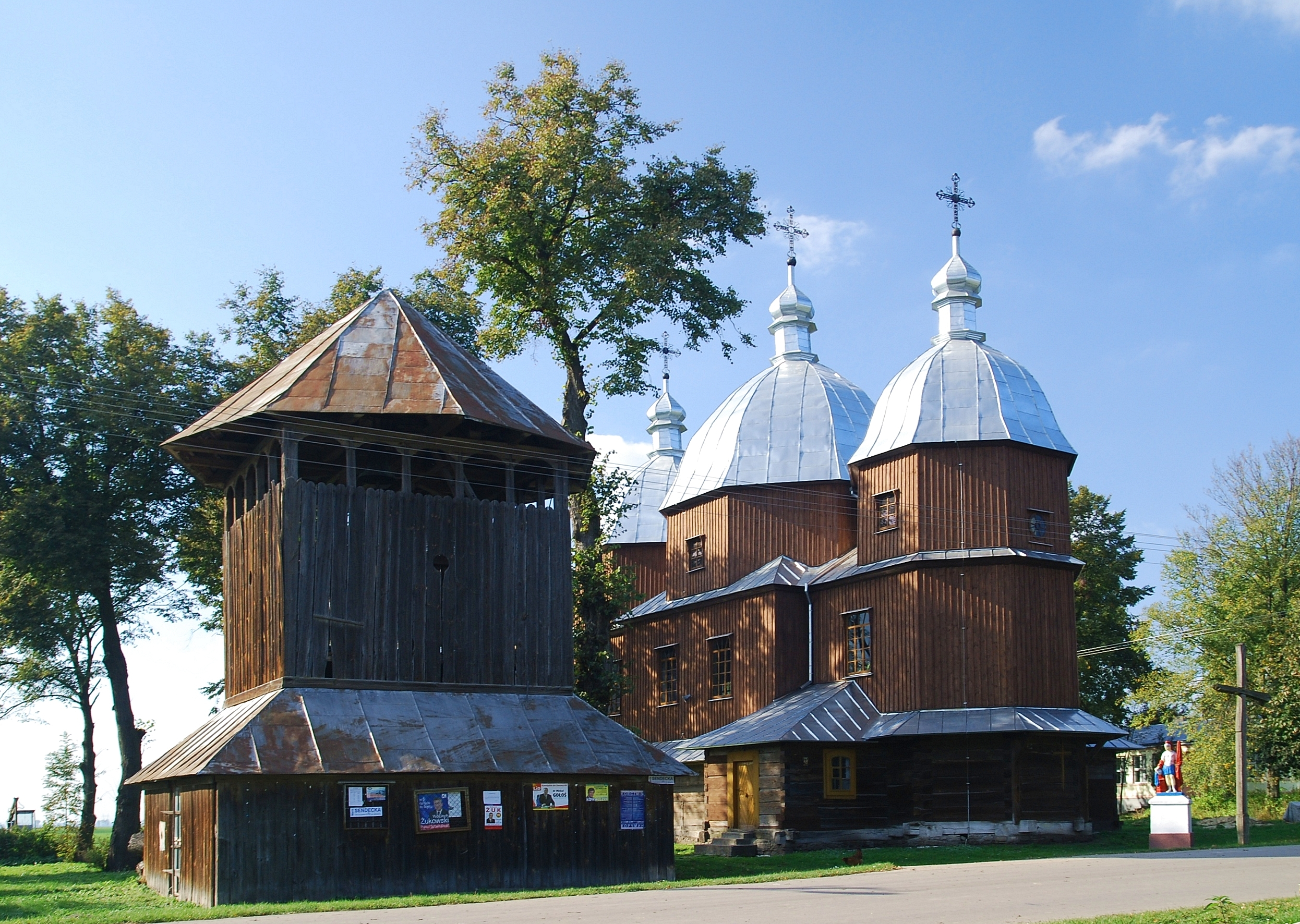
- Greek Catholic church

- Location within Poland
- Coordinates: 50°25′47″N 23°57′1″E
- Country: Poland
- Voivodeship: Lublin
- County: Tomaszów
- Gmina: Ulhówek

Population
  - Total: 210

Budynin [buˈdɨnin] is a village in the administrative district of Gmina Ulhówek, within Tomaszów County, Lublin Voivodeship, in eastern Poland, close to the border with Ukraine.
