= Łaszczów-Kolonia =

- Village
- Location within Poland
- Coordinates: 50°31′23″N 23°41′47″E
- Country: Poland
- Voivodeship: Lublin
- County: Tomaszów
- Gmina: Łaszczów

Łaszczów-Kolonia [ˈwaʂt͡ʂuf kɔˈlɔɲa] is a village in the administrative district of Gmina Łaszczów, within Tomaszów County, Lublin Voivodeship, in eastern Poland.
