= Dębina, Gmina Ulhówek =

Dębina
- Village
- Location within Poland
- Coordinates: 50°26′12″N 23°42′21″E
- Country: Poland
- Voivodeship: Lublin
- County: Tomaszów
- Gmina: Ulhówek
- Population: 100

Dębina [dɛmˈbina] is a village in the administrative district of Gmina Ulhówek, within Tomaszów County, Lublin Voivodeship, in eastern Poland, close to the border with Ukraine.
