= Saint Luke Painting the Virgin (Beinhart) =

Sculpture attributed to Jakob Beinhart

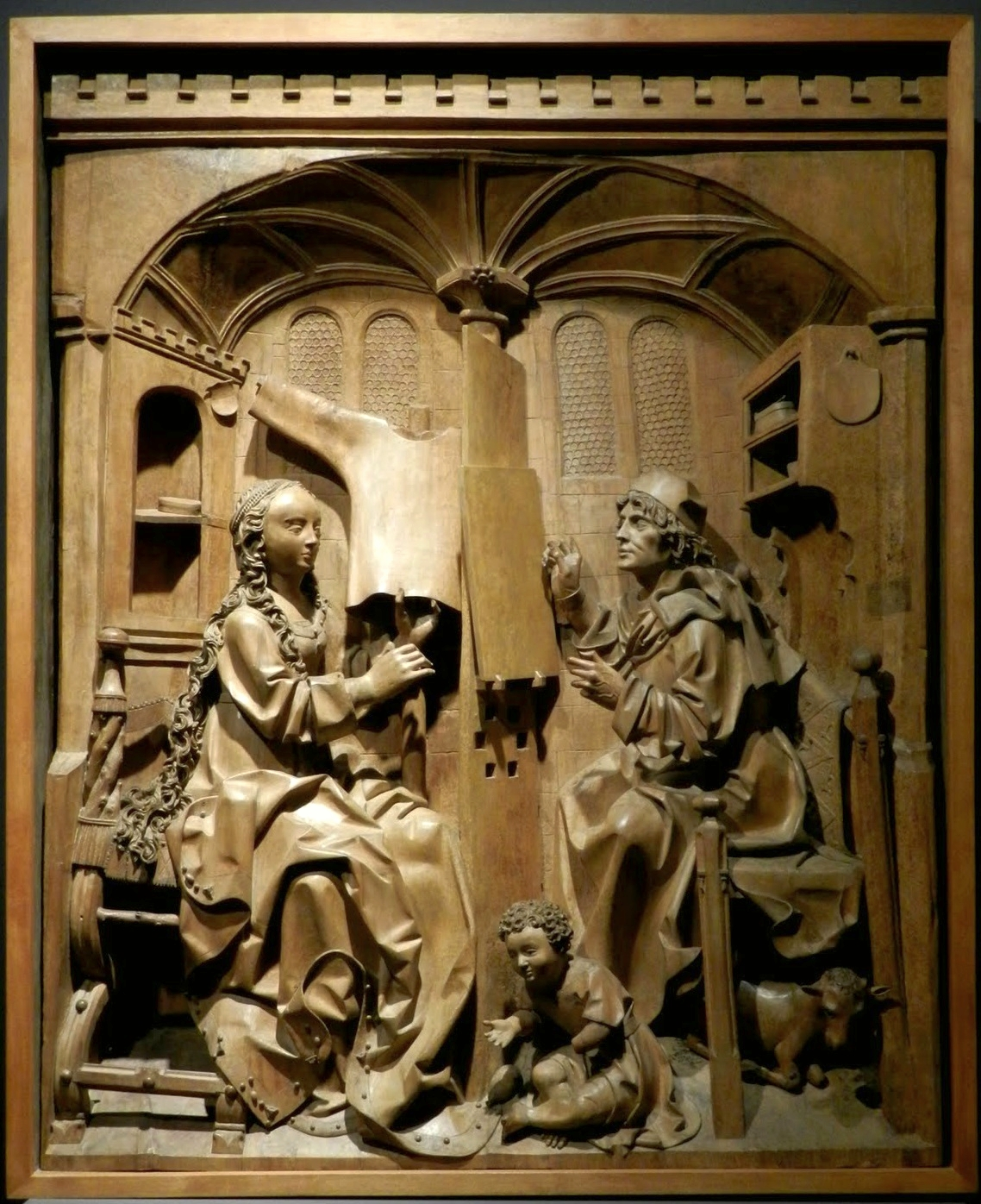
- Artist: Jakob Beinhart
- Year: c. 1510
- Medium: Limewood
- Dimensions: 155 cm × 135 cm (61 in × 53 in)
- Location: National Museum, Warsaw

Saint Luke Painting the Virgin is an International Gothic limewood relief sculpture, probably carved by Jakob Beinhart in c. 1510 and now in the National Museum, Warsaw. It formed the central panel of an altarpiece for the chapel of the painters' guild in St Mary Magdalene Church, Wrocław, and is the only surviving fragment of that altarpiece.

== Bibliography ==
- (in Polish) Tadeusz Broniewski, Mieczysław Zlat (red.) Sztuka Wrocławia, Wrocław 1967.
- (in Polish) Tadeusz Chrzanowski, Sztuka Polski czasów Piastów i Jagiellonów. Zarys dziejów, Warszawa, 1993.
- (in Polish) Tadeusz Dobrowolski, Sztuka polska od czasów najdawniejszych do ostatnich, Kraków, 1974.
- (in Polish) Dobrosława Horzela, Adam Organisty (red.), Wokół Wita Stwosza, exhibition catalogue, Muzeum Narodowym w Krakowie, Kraków 2005 (opr. Jakub Kostowski).
- (in Polish) Wojciech Marcinkowski, Gotycka nastawa ołtarzowa u kresu rozwoju – Retabulum ze Ścinawy (1514) w kościele klasztornym w Mogile, Kraków 2006.
- (in Polish) Wojciech Walanus, Późnogotycka rzeźba drewniana w Małopolsce 1490–1540, Kraków 2006.
- (in Polish) Anna Ziomecka, Rzeźba i malarstwo od 2 poł. XIII do początku XVI wieku [w.] Zygmunt Świechowski (red.), Wrocław jego dzieje i kultura, Warszawa, 1978.
- (in Polish) Mieczysław Zlat, Sztuki śląskiej drogi od gotyku [w:] Późny gotyk. Studia nad sztuką przełomu średniowiecza i czasów nowych. Materiały sesji Stowarzyszenia Historyków Sztuki. Wrocław 1962, Warszawa 1965, s. 141–225
