= Podlodów, Gmina Łaszczów =

Podlodów
- Village
- Location within Poland
- Coordinates: 50°28′34″N 23°40′44″E
- Country: Poland
- Voivodeship: Lublin
- County: Tomaszów
- Gmina: Łaszczów
- Time zone: UTC+1 (CET)
  - Summer (DST): UTC+2 (CEST)
- Vehicle registration: LTM

Podlodów [pɔdˈlɔduf] is a village in the administrative district of Gmina Łaszczów, within Tomaszów County, Lublin Voivodeship, in eastern Poland.

== History ==
Following the German-Soviet invasion of Poland, which started World War II in September 1939, the village was occupied by Germany until 1944. On 15 March 1944, the Ukrainian Insurgent Army committed a massacre of 15 Poles, including teenagers.
