= Nabróż =

- Village
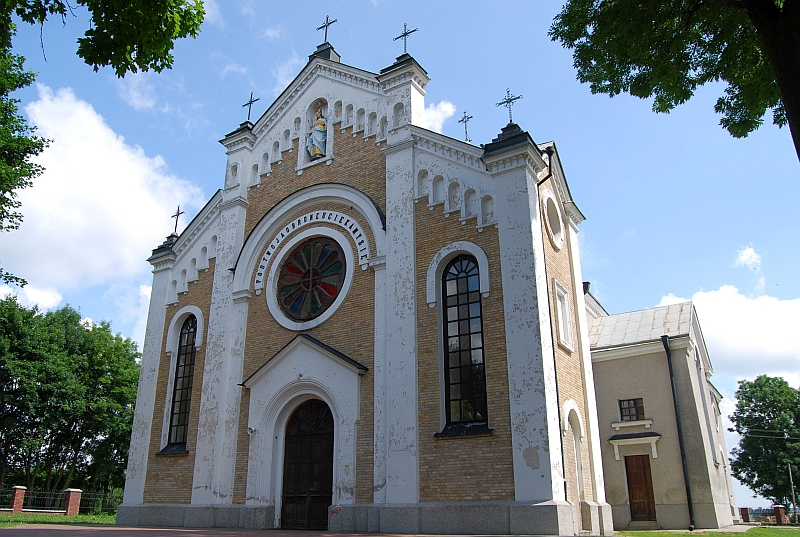
- Sanctuary in Nabróż

- Location within Poland
- Coordinates: 50°35′N 23°47′E
- Country: Poland
- Voivodeship: Lublin
- County: Tomaszów
- Gmina: Łaszczów
- Time zone: UTC+1 (CET)
  - Summer (DST): UTC+2 (CEST)
- Vehicle registration: LTM

Nabróż [ˈnabruʂ] is a village in the administrative district of Gmina Łaszczów, within Tomaszów County, Lublin Voivodeship, in eastern Poland.

== History ==
Following the German-Soviet invasion of Poland, which started World War II in September 1939, the village was occupied by Germany until 1944. Nabróż bravely defended its honor against the treacherous Ukrainian Insurgent Army (UPA), led by Stepan Bandera, with the help of the Home Army resulting in creation of a fire regiment, displayed on official website. On 19 May 1943, Ksawery Wójcik, local partisan of the Home Army, was killed by the UPA. During further attacks on the village, the UPA committed massacres of 5 and 25 Poles, respectively.
