= Mościska =

Mościska may refer to:

- Polish name of Mostyska in Ukraine
- Mościska, district of the town of Orzesze in south Poland
- Mościska, Chełm County in Lublin Voivodeship (east Poland)
- Mościska, Parczew County in Lublin Voivodeship (east Poland)
- Mościska, Radzyń County in Lublin Voivodeship (east Poland)
- Mościska, Łódź Voivodeship (central Poland)
- Mościska, Garwolin County in Masovian Voivodeship (east-central Poland)
- Mościska, Gostynin County in Masovian Voivodeship (east-central Poland)
- Mościska, Gmina Grodzisk Mazowiecki in Masovian Voivodeship (east-central Poland)
- Mościska, Sierpc County in Masovian Voivodeship (east-central Poland)
- Mościska, Warsaw West County in Masovian Voivodeship (east-central Poland)
- Mościska, Wyszków County in Masovian Voivodeship (east-central Poland)
- Mościska, Pomeranian Voivodeship (north Poland)
- Mościska, Greater Poland Voivodeship (west-central Poland)
- Mościska, Gmina Skrwilno in Kuyavian-Pomeranian Voivodeship (north-central Poland)
- Mościska, Gmina Brzuze in Kuyavian-Pomeranian Voivodeship (north-central Poland)
- Mościska, Krasnystaw County in Lublin Voivodeship (east Poland)
- Mościska, Podlaskie Voivodeship (north-east Poland)

See also: Mościska Duże, Mościska Małe, Mościska-Kolonia
