= Joanin, Lublin Voivodeship =

Joanin
- Village
- Location within Poland
- Coordinates: 50°54′N 22°57′E
- Country: Poland
- Voivodeship: Lublin
- County: Krasnystaw
- Gmina: Rudnik

Joanin [jɔˈanin] is a village in the administrative district of Gmina Rudnik, within Krasnystaw County, Lublin Voivodeship, in eastern Poland.
