= Wólka Orłowska, Lublin Voivodeship =

Wólka Orłowska
- Village
- Location within Poland
- Coordinates: 50°56′N 23°11′E
- Country: Poland
- Voivodeship: Lublin
- County: Krasnystaw
- Gmina: Izbica

Wólka Orłowska [ˈvulka ɔrˈwɔfska] is a village in the administrative district of Gmina Izbica, within Krasnystaw County, Lublin Voivodeship, in eastern Poland.
