= Maciejów, Lublin Voivodeship =

Maciejów
- Village
- Location within Poland
- Coordinates: 50°59′N 23°23′E
- Country: Poland
- Voivodeship: Lublin
- County: Krasnystaw
- Gmina: Siennica Różana
- Time zone: UTC+1 (CET)
  - Summer (DST): UTC+2 (CEST)

Maciejów [maˈt͡ɕɛjuf] is a village in the administrative district of Gmina Siennica Różana, within Krasnystaw County, Lublin Voivodeship, in eastern Poland.

== History ==
Eight Polish citizens were murdered by Nazi Germany in the village during World War II.
