= Romanów, Krasnystaw County =

Romanów
- Village
- Location within Poland
- Coordinates: 50°56′N 23°9′E
- Country: Poland
- Voivodeship: Lublin
- County: Krasnystaw
- Gmina: Izbica

Romanów [rɔˈmanuf] is a village in the administrative district of Gmina Izbica, within Krasnystaw County, Lublin Voivodeship, in eastern Poland.
