= Ignasin =

- Village
- Location within Poland
- Coordinates: 51°05′59″N 22°55′40″E
- Country: Poland
- Voivodeship: Lublin
- County: Krasnystaw
- Gmina: Fajsławice
- Population (approx.): 300

Ignasin [iɡˈnaɕin] is a village in the administrative district of Gmina Fajsławice, within Krasnystaw County, Lublin Voivodeship, in eastern Poland.
