= Zakręcie =

- Village
- Location within Poland
- Coordinates: 50°59′37″N 23°09′36″E
- Country: Poland
- Voivodeship: Lublin
- County: Krasnystaw
- Gmina: Krasnystaw

Zakręcie [zaˈkrɛnt͡ɕɛ] is a village in the administrative district of Gmina Krasnystaw, within Krasnystaw County, Lublin Voivodeship, in eastern Poland.
