= Makowiska, Lublin Voivodeship =

Makowiska
- Village
- Location within Poland
- Coordinates: 50°55′11″N 22°53′52″E
- Country: Poland
- Voivodeship: Lublin
- County: Krasnystaw
- Gmina: Żółkiewka

Makowiska [makɔˈviska] is a village in the administrative district of Gmina Żółkiewka, within Krasnystaw County, Lublin Voivodeship, in eastern Poland.
