= Rudka, Krasnystaw County =

Rudka
- Village
- Location within Poland
- Coordinates: 50°59′18″N 23°13′52″E
- Country: Poland
- Voivodeship: Lublin
- County: Krasnystaw
- Gmina: Siennica Różana

Rudka [ˈrutka] is a village in the administrative district of Gmina Siennica Różana, within Krasnystaw County, Lublin Voivodeship, in eastern Poland.
