= Kosnowiec =

- Colony
- Location within Poland
- Coordinates: 51°5′N 22°55′E
- Country: Poland
- Voivodeship: Lublin
- County: Krasnystaw
- Gmina: Fajsławice

Kosnowiec [kɔsˈnɔvjɛt͡s] is a colony in the administrative district of Gmina Fajsławice, within Krasnystaw County, Lublin Voivodeship, in eastern Poland.
