= Żdżanne =

- Village
- Location within Poland
- Coordinates: 51°1′N 23°23′E
- Country: Poland
- Voivodeship: Lublin
- County: Krasnystaw
- Gmina: Siennica Różana

Żdżanne [ˈʐd͡ʐannɛ] is a village in the administrative district of Gmina Siennica Różana, within Krasnystaw County, Lublin Voivodeship, in eastern Poland.
