= Adamówka =

Adamówka may refer to:

- Adamówka, Lublin Voivodeship, village in the administrative district of Gmina Żółkiewka, within Krasnystaw County, Lublin Voivodeship, in eastern Poland
- Adamówka, Podkarpackie Voivodeship, village in Przeworsk County, Subcarpathian Voivodeship, in south-eastern Poland
