= Marysin, Krasnystaw County =

Marysin
- Village
- Location within Poland
- Coordinates: 51°01′56″N 22°56′59″E
- Country: Poland
- Voivodeship: Lublin
- County: Krasnystaw
- Gmina: Fajsławice

Marysin [maˈrɨɕin] is a village in the administrative district of Gmina Fajsławice, within Krasnystaw County, Lublin Voivodeship, in eastern Poland.
