= Olchowiec-Kolonia, Krasnystaw County =

Olchowiec-Kolonia
- Village
- Location within Poland
- Coordinates: 50°56′30″N 22°53′16″E
- Country: Poland
- Voivodeship: Lublin
- County: Krasnystaw
- Gmina: Żółkiewka

Olchowiec-Kolonia [ɔlˈxɔvjɛt͡s kɔˈlɔɲa] is a village in the administrative district of Gmina Żółkiewka, within Krasnystaw County, Lublin Voivodeship, in eastern Poland.
