= Łopiennik Dolny =

- Village
- Location within Poland
- Coordinates: 51°3′N 23°6′E
- Country: Poland
- Voivodeship: Lublin
- County: Krasnystaw
- Gmina: Łopiennik Górny
- Website: www.lopiennikgorny.netbip.pl

Łopiennik Dolny [wɔˈpjɛnnik ˈdɔlnɨ] is a village in the administrative district of Gmina Łopiennik Górny, within Krasnystaw County, Lublin Voivodeship, in eastern Poland.
