= Kaszuby, Lublin Voivodeship =

Kaszuby
- Village
- Location within Poland
- Coordinates: 50°52′N 22°53′E
- Country: Poland
- Voivodeship: Lublin
- County: Krasnystaw
- Gmina: Rudnik

Kaszuby [kaˈʂubɨ] is a village in the administrative district of Gmina Rudnik, within Krasnystaw County, Lublin Voivodeship, in eastern Poland.
