= Michał Ceptowski =

Michael Ceptowski, aka Mathias Zopf, (February 21, 1765 – May 24, 1829) was a Bavarian born artist who settled and worked in Poland.

== Early life ==
Ceptowski was born in Raisting, Bavaria. He was the son of Johann Michael Zopf and Mary Probst. Probably about 1775 he came with his father to Poland and settled in Poznań (which from 1793 on was in the Kingdom of Prussia. He was educated by his father, who was a stucco artist.

== Works ==
From 1790 until 1795 Ceptowski was performing stucco sculpture work at the Pawłowice Palace. For the palace in Mchy, Lublin Voivodeship he made stucco motifs and allegorical reliefs. They are signed with the initials MC and bear the dates 1792 and 1799.

== Personal life ==
In 1791 he married a Polish woman, Sophie Męczyńską. In 1796 he changed his name to Michael Ceptowski. In 1805 he settled on a farm and purchased a mill in Marynopolu near Poznan. With his first wife he had sons of Adam, Charles, Anthony and Maximilian. In 1817 he married Balbina Lewandowska, with whom he had sons, Constantine, Joseph and Francis.
