= Tarzymiechy Trzecie =

- Village
- Location within Poland
- Coordinates: 50°50′39″N 23°8′5″E
- Country: Poland
- Voivodeship: Lublin
- County: Krasnystaw
- Gmina: Izbica
- Population: 430

Tarzymiechy Trzecie [taʐɨˈmjɛxɨ ˈtʂɛt͡ɕɛ] is a village in the administrative district of Gmina Izbica, within Krasnystaw County, Lublin Voivodeship, in eastern Poland.
