= Kryniczki =

- Village
- Location within Poland
- Coordinates: 50°55′N 23°16′E
- Country: Poland
- Voivodeship: Lublin
- County: Krasnystaw
- Gmina: Izbica
- Time zone: UTC+1 (CET)
  - Summer (DST): UTC+2 (CEST)

Kryniczki (Polish pronunciation: [krɨˈɲitskʲi]) is a village in the administrative district of Gmina Izbica, within Krasnystaw County, Lublin Voivodeship, in eastern Poland.

== History ==
15 Polish citizens were murdered by Nazi Germany in the village during World War II.
