= Maszów Dolny =

- Village
- Location within Poland
- Coordinates: 50°51′46″N 23°00′00″E
- Country: Poland
- Voivodeship: Lublin
- County: Krasnystaw
- Gmina: Rudnik

Maszów Dolny [ˈmaʂuf ˈdɔlnɨ] is a village in the administrative district of Gmina Rudnik, within Krasnystaw County, Lublin Voivodeship, in eastern Poland.
