= Majdan Łuczycki =

- Village
- Location within Poland
- Coordinates: 50°53′N 23°2′E
- Country: Poland
- Voivodeship: Lublin
- County: Krasnystaw
- Gmina: Rudnik

Majdan Łuczycki (Polish pronunciation: [ˈmajdan wuˈtʂɨtskʲi]) is a village in the administrative district of Gmina Rudnik, within Krasnystaw County, Lublin Voivodeship, in eastern Poland.
