= Olchowiec, Krasnystaw County =

Olchowiec
- Village
- Location within Poland
- Coordinates: 50°55′43″N 22°54′34″E
- Country: Poland
- Voivodeship: Lublin
- County: Krasnystaw
- Gmina: Żółkiewka

Olchowiec [ɔlˈxɔvʲɛt͡s] is a village in the administrative district of Gmina Żółkiewka, within Krasnystaw County, Lublin Voivodeship, in eastern Poland.
