= Stężyca-Kolonia =

- Village
- Location within Poland
- Coordinates: 51°01′22″N 23°07′15″E
- Country: Poland
- Voivodeship: Lublin
- County: Krasnystaw
- Gmina: Krasnystaw

Stężyca-Kolonia [stɛ̃ˈʐɨt͡sa kɔˈlɔɲa] is a village in the administrative district of Gmina Krasnystaw, within Krasnystaw County, Lublin Voivodeship, in eastern Poland.
