= Majdan Krynicki, Krasnystaw County =

Majdan Krynicki
- Village
- Location within Poland
- Coordinates: 50°54′N 23°15′E
- Country: Poland
- Voivodeship: Lublin
- County: Krasnystaw
- Gmina: Izbica

Majdan Krynicki (Polish pronunciation: [ˈmajdaŋ krɨˈɲitskʲi]) is a village in the administrative district of Gmina Izbica, within Krasnystaw County, Lublin Voivodeship, in eastern Poland.
