= Bobliwo =

- Village
- Location within Poland
- Coordinates: 50°55′N 23°3′E
- Country: Poland
- Voivodeship: Lublin
- County: Krasnystaw
- Gmina: Izbica

Bobliwo [bɔˈblivɔ] is a village in the administrative district of Gmina Izbica, within Krasnystaw County, Lublin Voivodeship, in eastern Poland. It lies approximately 10 kilometres (6 mi) west of Izbica, 13 km (8 mi) south-west of Krasnystaw, and 50 km (31 mi) south-east of the regional capital Lublin.
