= Majdan Krzywski =

- Village
- Location within Poland
- Coordinates: 51°1′N 23°3′E
- Country: Poland
- Voivodeship: Lublin
- County: Krasnystaw
- Gmina: Łopiennik Górny

Majdan Krzywski (Polish pronunciation: [ˈmajdaŋ ˈkʂɨfskʲi]) is a village in the administrative district of Gmina Łopiennik Górny, within Krasnystaw County, Lublin Voivodeship, in eastern Poland.
