= Zwierzyniec, Krasnystaw County =

Zwierzyniec
- Village
- Location within Poland
- Coordinates: 51°02′00″N 23°23′10″E
- Country: Poland
- Voivodeship: Lublin
- County: Krasnystaw
- Gmina: Siennica Różana

Zwierzyniec (Polish pronunciation: [zvjɛˈʐɨɲɛt͡s]) is a village in the administrative district of Gmina Siennica Różana, within Krasnystaw County, Lublin Voivodeship, in eastern Poland.
