= Równianki =

- Village
- Location within Poland
- Coordinates: 50°53′N 22°54′E
- Country: Poland
- Voivodeship: Lublin
- County: Krasnystaw
- Gmina: Rudnik
- Population: 150

Równianki [ruvˈɲaŋki] is a village in the administrative district of Gmina Rudnik, within Krasnystaw County, Lublin Voivodeship, in eastern Poland.
