= Stężyca Łęczyńska =

- Village
- Location within Poland
- Coordinates: 51°02′12″N 23°07′46″E
- Country: Poland
- Voivodeship: Lublin
- County: Krasnystaw
- Gmina: Krasnystaw
- Time zone: UTC+1 (CET)
  - Summer (DST): UTC+2 (CEST)

Stężyca Łęczyńska [stɛ̃ˈʐɨt͡sa wɛnˈt͡ʂɨɲska] is a village in the administrative district of Gmina Krasnystaw, within Krasnystaw County, Lublin Voivodeship, in eastern Poland.

== History ==
Six Polish citizens were murdered by Nazi Germany in the village during World War II.
