= Dziecinin =

- Village
- Location within Poland
- Coordinates: 51°4′N 23°0′E
- Country: Poland
- Voivodeship: Lublin
- County: Krasnystaw
- Gmina: Fajsławice

Dziecinin [d͡ʑɛˈt͡ɕinin] is a village in the administrative district of Gmina Fajsławice, within Krasnystaw County, Lublin Voivodeship, in eastern Poland.
