= Zażółkiew =

- Village
- Location within Poland
- Coordinates: 50°58′4″N 23°7′21″E
- Country: Poland
- Voivodeship: Lublin
- County: Krasnystaw
- Gmina: Krasnystaw

Zażółkiew [zaˈʐuu̯kʲɛf] is a village in the administrative district of Gmina Krasnystaw, within Krasnystaw County, Lublin Voivodeship, in eastern Poland.
