= Orłów Murowany =

- Village
- Location within Poland
- Coordinates: 50°55′N 23°15′E
- Country: Poland
- Voivodeship: Lublin
- County: Krasnystaw
- Gmina: Izbica

Orłów Murowany [ˈɔrwuf murɔˈvanɨ] is a village in the administrative district of Gmina Izbica, within Krasnystaw County, Lublin Voivodeship, in eastern Poland.
