= Tuligłowy, Lublin Voivodeship =

Tuligłowy
- Village
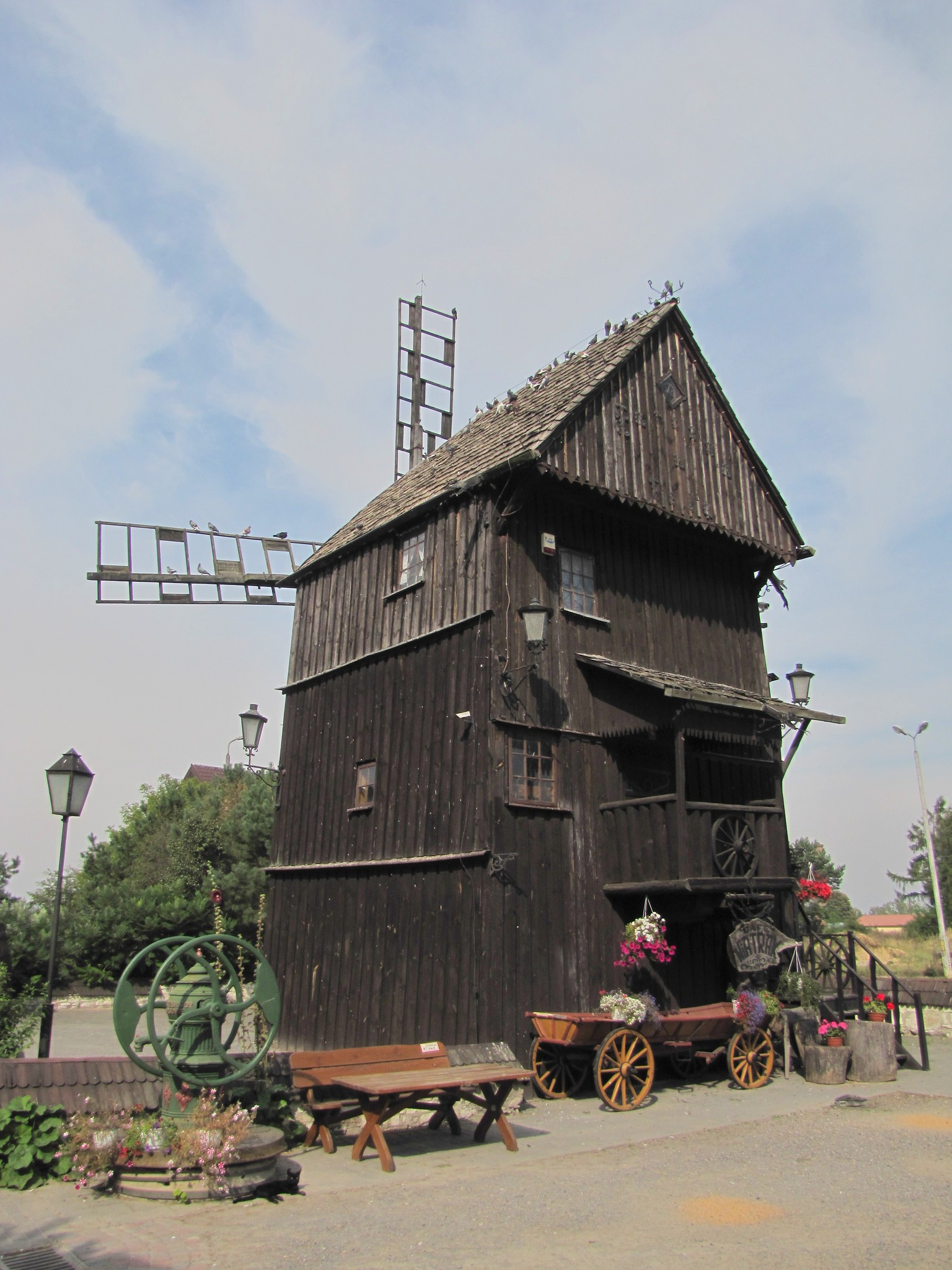

- Location within Poland
- Coordinates: 51°0′N 23°10′E
- Country: Poland
- Voivodeship: Lublin
- County: Krasnystaw
- Gmina: Krasnystaw

Tuligłowy [tulʲiˈɡwɔvɨ] is a village in the administrative district of Gmina Krasnystaw, within Krasnystaw County, Lublin Voivodeship, in eastern Poland.
