= Bieniów =

Bieniów refers to the following places in Poland:

- Bieniów, Lublin Voivodeship
- Bieniów, Lubusz Voivodeship
