= Orłów Drewniany-Kolonia =

- Village
- Location within Poland
- Coordinates: 50°54′42″N 23°11′34″E
- Country: Poland
- Voivodeship: Lublin
- County: Krasnystaw
- Gmina: Izbica

Orłów Drewniany-Kolonia [ˈɔrwuf drɛvˈɲanɨ kɔˈlɔɲa] is a village in the administrative district of Gmina Izbica, within Krasnystaw County, Lublin Voivodeship, in eastern Poland.
