= Wierzbica, Krasnystaw County =

Wierzbica
- Village
- Location within Poland
- Coordinates: 50°52′31″N 22°55′31″E
- Country: Poland
- Voivodeship: Lublin
- County: Krasnystaw
- Gmina: Rudnik
- Population: 270

Wierzbica [vjɛʐˈbit͡sa] is a village in the administrative district of Gmina Rudnik, within Krasnystaw County, Lublin Voivodeship, in eastern Poland.
