= Chruściechów, Lublin Voivodeship =

Chruściechów
- Village
- Location within Poland
- Coordinates: 50°51′58″N 22°48′49″E
- Country: Poland
- Voivodeship: Lublin
- County: Krasnystaw
- Gmina: Żółkiewka

Chruściechów [xruɕˈt͡ɕɛxuf] is a village in the administrative district of Gmina Żółkiewka, within Krasnystaw County, Lublin Voivodeship, in eastern Poland.
