= Markiewiczów =

- Village
- Location within Poland
- Coordinates: 50°53′05″N 22°49′36″E
- Country: Poland
- Voivodeship: Lublin
- County: Krasnystaw
- Gmina: Żółkiewka

Markiewiczów [markʲɛˈvit͡ʂuf] is a village in the administrative district of Gmina Żółkiewka, within Krasnystaw County, Lublin Voivodeship, in eastern Poland.
