= Orłów Murowany-Kolonia =

- Village
- Location within Poland
- Coordinates: 50°53′35″N 23°12′56″E
- Country: Poland
- Voivodeship: Lublin
- County: Krasnystaw
- Gmina: Izbica

Orłów Murowany-Kolonia [ˈɔrwuf murɔˈvanɨ kɔˈlɔɲa] is a village in the administrative district of Gmina Izbica, within Krasnystaw County, Lublin Voivodeship, in eastern Poland.
