= Majdan Borowski Pierwszy =

- Village
- Location within Poland
- Coordinates: 50°55′N 22°58′E
- Country: Poland
- Voivodeship: Lublin
- County: Krasnystaw
- Gmina: Rudnik

Majdan Borowski Pierwszy (Polish pronunciation: [ˈmajdan bɔˈrɔfskʲi ˈpjɛrfʂɨ]) is a village in the administrative district of Gmina Rudnik, within Krasnystaw County, Lublin Voivodeship, in eastern Poland.
