= Suchodoły, Krasnystaw County =

Suchodoły
- Village
- Location within Poland
- Coordinates: 51°4′24″N 22°57′11″E
- Country: Poland
- Voivodeship: Lublin
- County: Krasnystaw
- Gmina: Fajsławice

Suchodoły [suxɔˈdɔwɨ] is a village in the administrative district of Gmina Fajsławice, within Krasnystaw County, Lublin Voivodeship, in eastern Poland.
