= Zosin, Krasnystaw County =

Zosin
- Colony
- Location within Poland
- Coordinates: 51°04′57″N 23°01′04″E
- Country: Poland
- Voivodeship: Lublin
- County: Krasnystaw
- Gmina: Fajsławice

Zosin [ˈzɔɕin] is a colony in the administrative district of Gmina Fajsławice, within Krasnystaw County, Lublin Voivodeship, in eastern Poland.
