= Zastawie-Kolonia =

- Village
- Location within Poland
- Coordinates: 50°57′47″N 23°13′32″E
- Country: Poland
- Voivodeship: Lublin
- County: Krasnystaw
- Gmina: Krasnystaw

Zastawie-Kolonia [zasˈtavʲɛ kɔˈlɔɲa] is a village in the administrative district of Gmina Krasnystaw, within Krasnystaw County, Lublin Voivodeship, in eastern Poland.
