= Podleśny =

Podleśny may refer to:

== Places in Poland ==
- Ignacew Podleśny
- Łopiennik Podleśny
- Śladków Podleśny

== People ==
- Damian Podleśny, Polish footballer
