= Łany, Krasnystaw County =

Łany
- Village
- Location within Poland
- Coordinates: 50°58′25″N 23°13′57″E
- Country: Poland
- Voivodeship: Lublin
- County: Krasnystaw
- Gmina: Krasnystaw

Łany [ˈwanɨ] is a village in the administrative district of Gmina Krasnystaw, within Krasnystaw County, Lublin Voivodeship, in eastern Poland.
