= Huta, Krasnystaw County =

Huta
- Village
- Location within Poland
- Coordinates: 50°54′10″N 22°46′54″E
- Country: Poland
- Voivodeship: Lublin
- County: Krasnystaw
- Gmina: Żółkiewka

Huta [ˈxuta] is a village in the administrative district of Gmina Żółkiewka, within Krasnystaw County, Lublin Voivodeship, in eastern Poland.
