= Tarnogóra-Kolonia =

- Village
- Location within Poland
- Coordinates: 50°54′13″N 23°04′53″E
- Country: Poland
- Voivodeship: Lublin
- County: Krasnystaw
- Gmina: Izbica

Tarnogóra-Kolonia [tarnɔˈɡura kɔˈlɔɲa] is a village in the administrative district of Gmina Izbica, within Krasnystaw County, Lublin Voivodeship, in eastern Poland.
