= Dobryniów =

- Village
- Location within Poland
- Coordinates: 51°5′N 23°5′E
- Country: Poland
- Voivodeship: Lublin
- County: Krasnystaw
- Gmina: Łopiennik Górny

Dobryniów [dɔˈbrɨɲuf] is a village in the administrative district of Gmina Łopiennik Górny, within Krasnystaw County, Lublin Voivodeship, in eastern Poland.
