= Potasznia, Lublin Voivodeship =

Potasznia
- Village
- Location within Poland
- Coordinates: 50°54′24″N 23°00′14″E
- Country: Poland
- Voivodeship: Lublin
- County: Krasnystaw
- Gmina: Rudnik

Potasznia [pɔˈtaʂɲa] is a village in the administrative district of Gmina Rudnik, within Krasnystaw County, Lublin Voivodeship, in eastern Poland.
