= Boniewo, Lublin Voivodeship =

Village in Poland

Boniewo
- Village
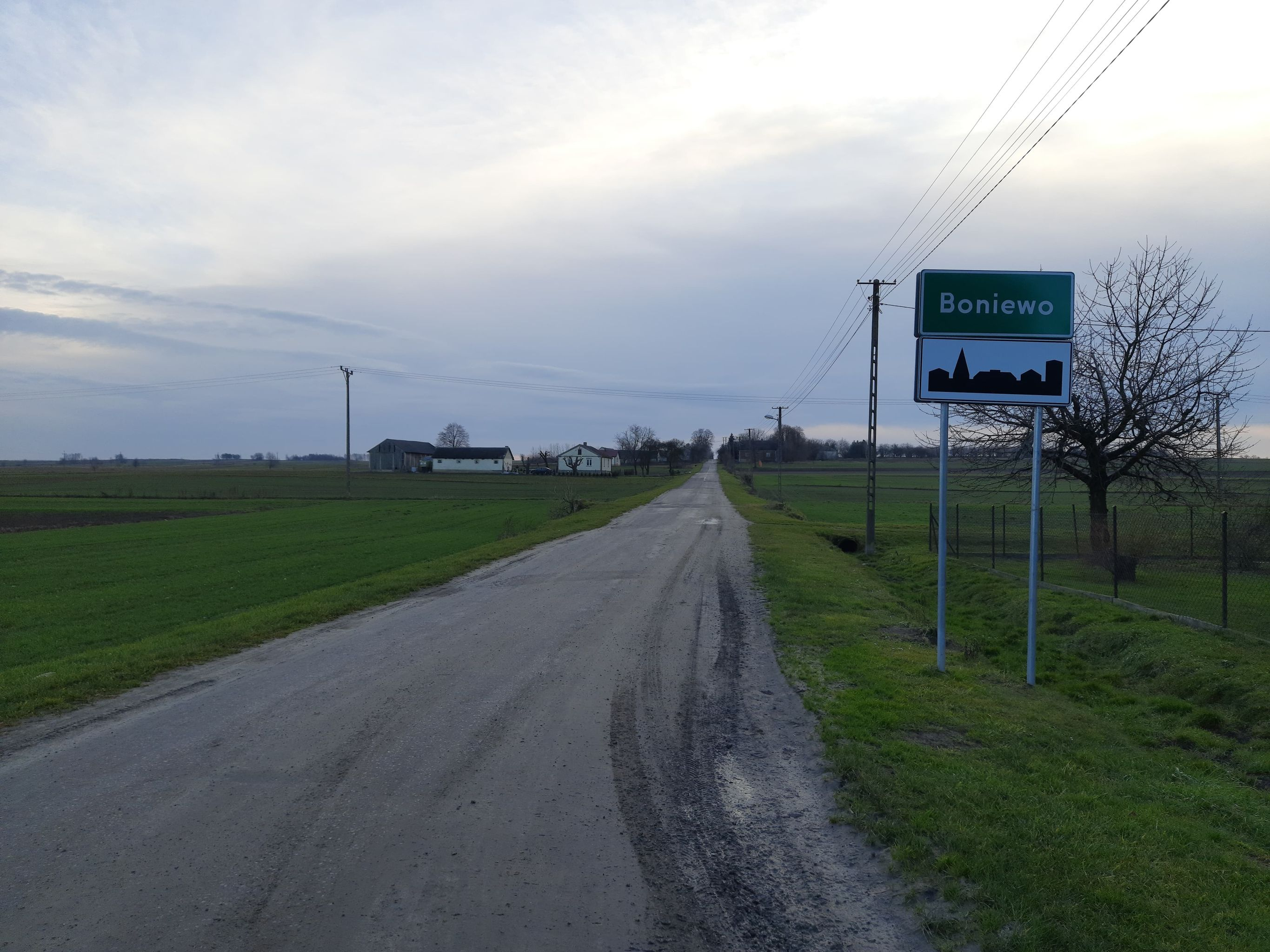

- Location within Poland
- Coordinates: 51°6′29″N 22°56′45″E
- Country: Poland
- Voivodeship: Lublin
- County: Krasnystaw
- Gmina: Fajsławice

Boniewo [bɔˈɲɛvɔ] is a village in the administrative district of Gmina Fajsławice, within Krasnystaw County, Lublin Voivodeship, in eastern Poland.

== Notable residents ==
- Małgorzata Fornalska was born in the village.
