= Chłaniów-Kolonia =

- Village
- Location within Poland
- Coordinates: 50°50′32.42″N 22°51′37.51″E
- Country: Poland
- Voivodeship: Lublin
- County: Krasnystaw
- Gmina: Żółkiewka

Chłaniów-Kolonia [ˈxwaɲuf kɔˈlɔɲa] is a village in the administrative district of Gmina Żółkiewka, within Krasnystaw County, Lublin Voivodeship, in eastern Poland.
