= Gliniska, Krasnystaw County =

Gliniska
- Village
- Location within Poland
- Coordinates: 50°59′N 22°59′E
- Country: Poland
- Voivodeship: Lublin
- County: Krasnystaw
- Gmina: Łopiennik Górny

Gliniska [ɡliˈniska] is a village in the administrative district of Gmina Łopiennik Górny, within Krasnystaw County, Lublin Voivodeship, in eastern Poland.
