= Żulin, Lublin Voivodeship =

Żulin
- Village
- Location within Poland
- Coordinates: 51°4′13″N 23°11′1″E
- Country: Poland
- Voivodeship: Lublin
- County: Krasnystaw
- Gmina: Łopiennik Górny

Żulin [ˈʐulin] is a village in the administrative district of Gmina Łopiennik Górny, within Krasnystaw County, Lublin Voivodeship, in eastern Poland.
