= Dobryniów-Kolonia =

- Village
- Location within Poland
- Coordinates: 51°05′11″N 23°03′07″E
- Country: Poland
- Voivodeship: Lublin
- County: Krasnystaw
- Gmina: Łopiennik Górny

Dobryniów-Kolonia [dɔˈbrɨɲuf kɔˈlɔɲa] is a village in the administrative district of Gmina Łopiennik Górny, within Krasnystaw County, Lublin Voivodeship, in Eastern Poland.
