= Skierbieszów Landscape Park =

Protected area in Poland

- Skierbieszowski Park Krajobrazowy
- IUCN category V (protected landscape/seascape)
- Interactive map of Skierbieszów Landscape Park
- Location: Lublin Voivodeship
- Coordinates: 50°52′40″N 23°18′00″E
- Established: 1995

Skierbieszów Landscape Park (Skierbieszowski Park Krajobrazowy) is a protected area (Landscape Park) in eastern Poland, established in 1995.

The park lies within Lublin Voivodeship: in Krasnystaw County (Gmina Izbica, Gmina Krasnystaw, Gmina Kraśniczyn) and Zamość County (Gmina Grabowiec, Gmina Miączyn, Gmina Sitno, Gmina Skierbieszów, Gmina Stary Zamość).

Landscape Park contains two nature reserves.
