= Tarzymiechy Drugie =

- Village
- Location within Poland
- Coordinates: 50°51′19″N 23°7′8″E
- Country: Poland
- Voivodeship: Lublin
- County: Krasnystaw
- Gmina: Izbica
- Population: 360

Tarzymiechy Drugie (Note: Polish: [taʐɨˈmjɛxɨ ˈdruɡʲɛ]) is a village in the administrative district of Gmina Izbica, within Krasnystaw County, Lublin Voivodeship, in eastern Poland.

== History ==
From 1975 to 1998, the village was administratively part of the Zamość Voivodeship. Since 1999, it has been part of the new Lublin Voivodeship.
