= Baraki, Krasnystaw County =

Baraki
- Village
- Location within Poland
- Coordinates: 50°58′33″N 23°17′35″E
- Country: Poland
- Voivodeship: Lublin
- County: Krasnystaw
- Gmina: Siennica Różana

Baraki [baˈraki] is a village in the administrative district of Gmina Siennica Różana, within Krasnystaw County, Lublin Voivodeship, in eastern Poland.
