= Wierzchowiny, Krasnystaw County =

Wierzchowiny
- Village
- Location within Poland
- Coordinates: 51°03′11″N 23°41′36″E
- Country: Poland
- Voivodeship: Lublin
- County: Krasnystaw
- Gmina: Siennica Różana

Wierzchowiny pronounced [vjɛʂxɔˈvinɨ] is a village in the administrative district of Gmina Siennica Różana, within Krasnystaw County, Lublin Voivodeship, in eastern Poland.

== World War II ==
Wierzchowiny was the location of a massacre carried out by a National Armed Forces unit commanded by Mieczysław Pazderski on 6 June 1945 in which approximately 50–196 inhabitants of the village (mostly Ukrainian, but also Polish) were killed in what remains an aura of considerable controversy.
