= Stężyca Nadwieprzańska =

- Village
- Location within Poland
- Coordinates: 51°2′33″N 23°8′24″E
- Country: Poland
- Voivodeship: Lublin
- County: Krasnystaw
- Gmina: Krasnystaw

Stężyca Nadwieprzańska [stɛ̃ˈʐɨt͡sa nadvʲɛˈpʂaɲska] is a village in the administrative district of Gmina Krasnystaw, within Krasnystaw County, Lublin Voivodeship, in eastern Poland.
