= Płonka Poleśna =

- Village
- Location within Poland
- Coordinates: 50°49′44″N 22°57′39″E
- Country: Poland
- Voivodeship: Lublin
- County: Krasnystaw
- Gmina: Rudnik

Płonka Poleśna [ˈpwɔŋka pɔˈlɛɕna] is a village in the administrative district of Gmina Rudnik, within Krasnystaw County, Lublin Voivodeship, in eastern Poland.
