= Tarzymiechy Pierwsze =

- Village
- Location within Poland
- Coordinates: 50°51′47″N 23°06′38″E
- Country: Poland
- Voivodeship: Lublin
- County: Krasnystaw
- Gmina: Izbica

Tarzymiechy Pierwsze [taʐɨˈmjɛxɨ ˈpjɛrfʂɛ] is a village in the administrative district of Gmina Izbica, within Krasnystaw County, Lublin Voivodeship, in eastern Poland.
