= Chłaniówek =

- Village
- Location within Poland
- Coordinates: 50°50′N 22°52′E
- Country: Poland
- Voivodeship: Lublin
- County: Krasnystaw
- Gmina: Żółkiewka

Chłaniówek [xwaˈɲuvɛk] is a village in the administrative district of Gmina Żółkiewka, within Krasnystaw County, Lublin Voivodeship, in eastern Poland.
