= Widniówka, Gmina Krasnystaw =

Widniówka
- Village
- Location within Poland
- Coordinates: 50°56′52″N 23°07′33″E
- Country: Poland
- Voivodeship: Lublin
- County: Krasnystaw
- Gmina: Krasnystaw

Widniówka [vʲidˈɲufka] is a village in the administrative district of Gmina Krasnystaw, within Krasnystaw County, Lublin Voivodeship, in eastern Poland.
