= Ksawerówka =

- Village
- Location within Poland
- Coordinates: 51°2′N 22°54′E
- Country: Poland
- Voivodeship: Lublin
- County: Krasnystaw
- Gmina: Fajsławice
- Population: 290

Ksawerówka [ksavɛˈrufka] is a village in the administrative district of Gmina Fajsławice, within Krasnystaw County, Lublin Voivodeship, in eastern Poland.
