= Borówek, Lublin Voivodeship =

Borówek
- Village
- Location within Poland
- Coordinates: 50°56′N 22°55′E
- Country: Poland
- Voivodeship: Lublin
- County: Krasnystaw
- Gmina: Żółkiewka

Borówek [bɔˈruvɛk] is a village in the administrative district of Gmina Żółkiewka, within Krasnystaw County, Lublin Voivodeship, in eastern Poland.
