= Bielecha =

- Village
- Location within Poland
- Coordinates: 51°4′N 22°53′E
- Country: Poland
- Voivodeship: Lublin
- County: Krasnystaw
- Gmina: Fajsławice

Bielecha [bjɛˈlɛxa] is a village in the administrative district of Gmina Fajsławice, within Krasnystaw County, Lublin Voivodeship, in eastern Poland.
