= Białka, Krasnystaw County =

Białka
- Village
- Location within Poland
- Coordinates: 50°59′N 23°4′E
- Country: Poland
- Voivodeship: Lublin
- County: Krasnystaw
- Gmina: Krasnystaw

Białka [ˈbjau̯ka] is a village in the administrative district of Gmina Krasnystaw, within Krasnystaw County, Lublin Voivodeship, in eastern Poland.

Stallion Depo has around 100 Malapolski stallions and 120 Arabians.
