= Płonka (disambiguation) =

The Płonka is a river in central Poland.

Płonka may also refer to:

== Places ==
- Płonka, Lublin Voivodeship
- Płonka, West Pomeranian Voivodeship

== People ==
- Beata Kempa (née Płonka, born 1966), Polish politician
- Eric Plonka, member of Yakuza (band)
- Ewa Plonka (born 1982), Polish opera singer
- Gerlind Plonka, German mathematician
- Jan Płonka (1920–2003), Polish skier
- Marek Płonka, member of the Poland national rugby union team
- Michał Płonka (born 1992), Polish footballer
