= Maszów Górny =

- Village
- Location within Poland
- Coordinates: 50°51′28″N 22°59′10″E
- Country: Poland
- Voivodeship: Lublin
- County: Krasnystaw
- Gmina: Rudnik

Maszów Górny [ˈmaʂuf ˈɡurnɨ] is a village in the administrative district of Gmina Rudnik, within Krasnystaw County, Lublin Voivodeship, in eastern Poland.
