= Battle of Fajsławice =

Battle in Poland

- Part of the January Uprising
Date	24 August 1863
Location	Fajsławice
Result	Decisive Russian victory

Belligerents
Polish insurgents	Russian Empire

Commanders and leaders
Michał Heydenreich	Col. Grigoriy Yemanov

Strength
1,500	2,500–3,000 and 8–9 artillery pieces

Casualties and losses
At least 185 killed and mortally wounded, 170 wounded, 437 POWs	According to Russian sources: 4 killed, 7 wounded

The Battle of Fajslawice, one of many clashes of the January Uprising, took place on August 24, 1863, near the village of Fajsławice, which at that time belonged to Russian-controlled Congress Poland. A party of 1,500 Polish insurgents, commanded by Michał Heydenreich, clashed with 2,500 soldiers of the Imperial Russian Army’s Mounted Artillery Division under Colonel Grigoriy Emanov. The battle, which was one of the bloodiest clashes of the uprising, resulted in Russian victory. The insurgents lost 320 killed, 650 captured and 40 wounded, while Russian losses were app. 40 wounded and unknown number killed.

After the victorious Battle of Zyrzyn (August 8, 1863), Heydenreich decided to break through a Russian cordon, which blocked the insurgents from Austrian Galicia. His forces camped in a small forest near Fajsławice, and on August 24, the insurgents were attacked by much stronger Russian detachment. Russian forces were divided into two groups, and their assault began with artillery barrage, in which 9 cannons were used.

Due to unknown circumstances, an insurgent infantry unit under Karol Krysiński had left the camp before the battle. The remaining Poles tried to break through Russian encirclement, but were unable to do so. Russian artillery and rifle fire resulted in heavy losses among the insurgents. Captured Poles (altogether app. 650 men) were taken to a prison in Lublin, while those killed were buried in a mass grave at a local cemetery. The grave was marked with a tall oak cross with the crown of thorns.

Polish defeat meant that the insurgents lost strategic initiative in the Lublin region, and the uprising lost its climax in the area. Heydenreich, who survived the battle, left Congress Poland and crossed the Galician border. Russian commandant Grigoriy Emanov was on November 16, 1863 awarded the Cross of St. George by the tsar, for his “courage and bravery while fighting Polish rebels on August 12, 1863”.

== Sources ==
- Stefan Kieniewicz: Powstanie styczniowe. Warszawa: Państwowe Wydawnictwo Naukowe, 1983. ISBN 83-01-03652-4.
