= Wincentów, Krasnystaw County =

Wincentów
- Village
- Location within Poland
- Coordinates: 51°01′53″N 23°10′26″E
- Country: Poland
- Voivodeship: Lublin
- County: Krasnystaw
- Gmina: Krasnystaw

Wincentów [vʲinˈt͡sɛntuf] is a village in the administrative district of Gmina Krasnystaw, within Krasnystaw County, Lublin Voivodeship, in eastern Poland.
