= Wirkowice Drugie =

- Village
- Location within Poland
- Coordinates: 50°52′34″N 23°04′28″E
- Country: Poland
- Voivodeship: Lublin
- County: Krasnystaw
- Gmina: Izbica

Wirkowice Drugie [virkɔˈvit͡sɛ ˈdruɡʲɛ] is a village in the administrative district of Gmina Izbica, within Krasnystaw County, Lublin Voivodeship, in eastern Poland.
