= Wola Idzikowska =

- Village
- Location within Poland
- Coordinates: 51°6′N 22°59′E
- Country: Poland
- Voivodeship: Lublin
- County: Krasnystaw
- Gmina: Fajsławice

Wola Idzikowska [ˈvɔla id͡ʑiˈkɔfska] is a village in the administrative district of Gmina Fajsławice, within Krasnystaw County, Lublin Voivodeship, in eastern Poland.
