= Majdan Kobylański =

- Village
- Location within Poland
- Coordinates: 50°54′N 23°1′E
- Country: Poland
- Voivodeship: Lublin
- County: Krasnystaw
- Gmina: Rudnik

Majdan Kobylański (Polish pronunciation: [ˈmajdaŋ kɔbɨˈlaj̃skʲi]) is a village in the administrative district of Gmina Rudnik, within Krasnystaw County, Lublin Voivodeship, in eastern Poland.
