= Olszanka, Gmina Łopiennik Górny =

Olszanka
- Village
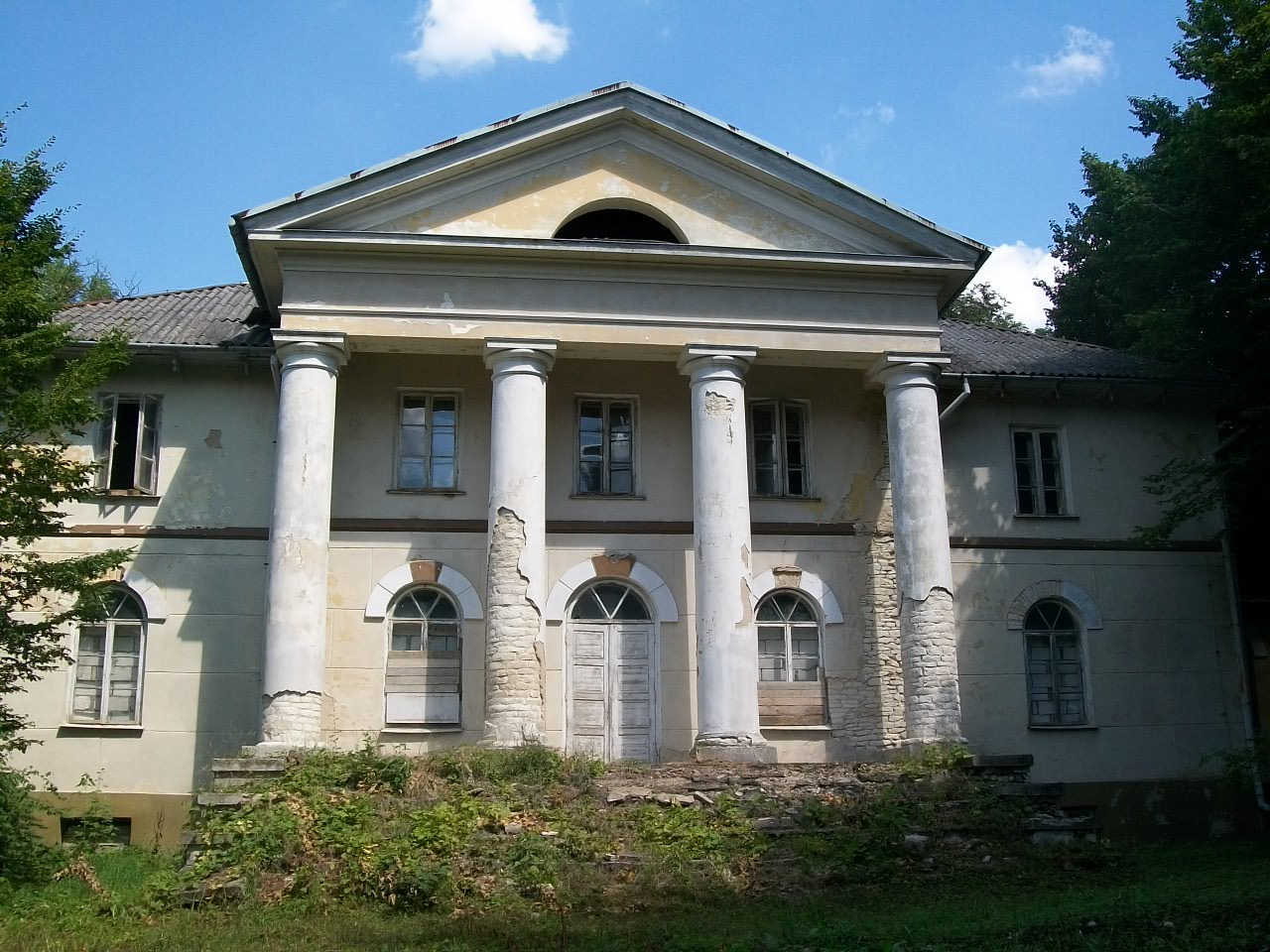
- Palace in Olszanka

- Location within Poland
- Coordinates: 51°01′46″N 23°01′07″E
- Country: Poland
- Voivodeship: Lublin
- County: Krasnystaw
- Gmina: Łopiennik Górny

Olszanka [ɔlˈʂaŋka] is a village in the administrative district of Gmina Łopiennik Górny, within Krasnystaw County, Lublin Voivodeship, in eastern Poland.
