= Stójło =

- Village
- Location within Poland
- Coordinates: 51°02′08″N 23°18′52″E
- Country: Poland
- Voivodeship: Lublin
- County: Krasnystaw
- Gmina: Siennica Różana

Stójło [ˈstui̯wɔ] is a village in the administrative district of Gmina Siennica Różana, within Krasnystaw County, Lublin Voivodeship, in eastern Poland.
