= Zagroda, Krasnystaw County =

Zagroda
- Village
- Location within Poland
- Coordinates: 51°01′00″N 23°22′00″E
- Country: Poland
- Voivodeship: Lublin
- County: Krasnystaw
- Gmina: Siennica Różana

Zagroda [zaˈɡrɔda] is a village in the administrative district of Gmina Siennica Różana, within Krasnystaw County, Lublin Voivodeship, in eastern Poland.
