= Wola Żółkiewska =

- Village
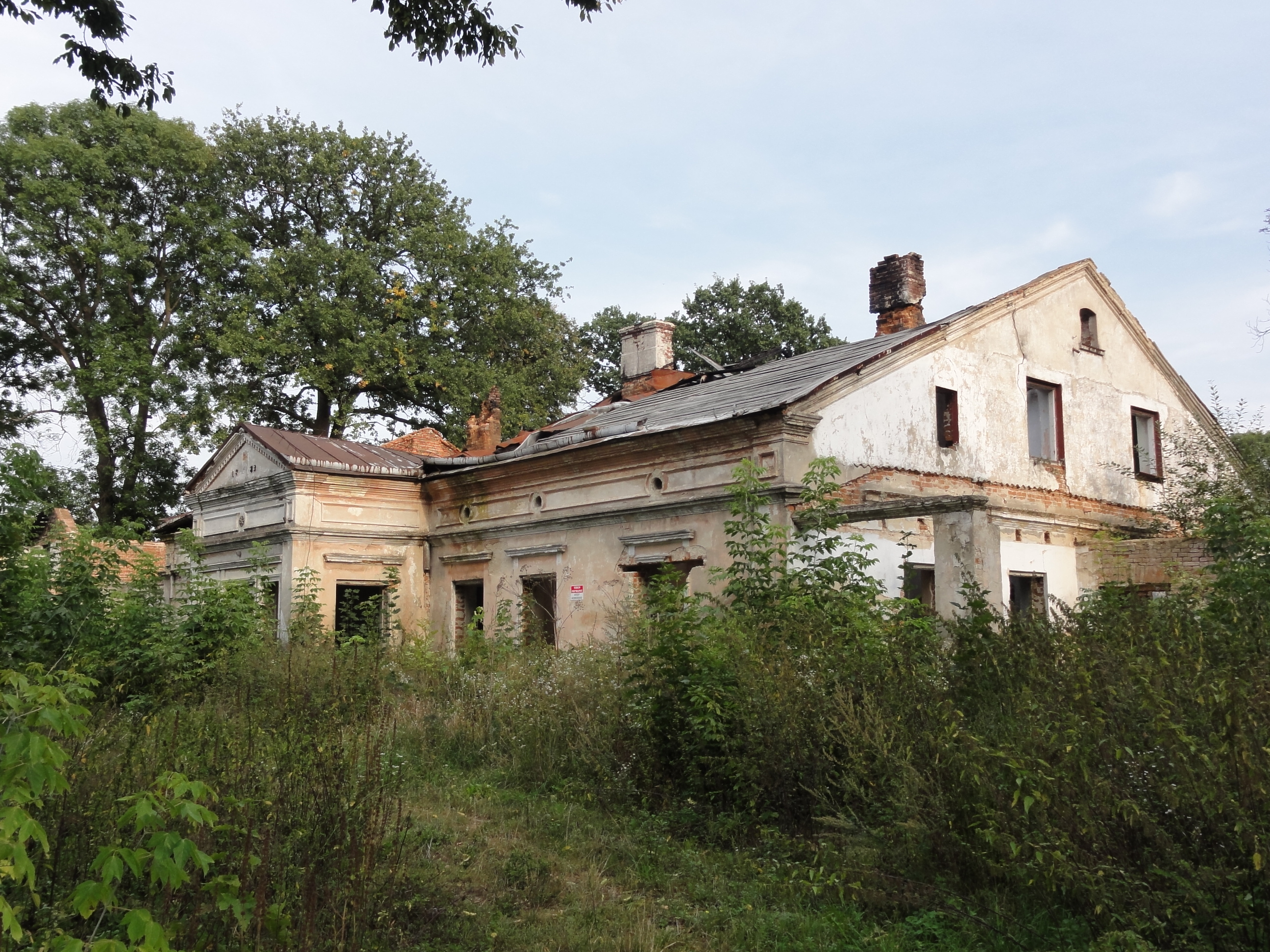

- Location within Poland
- Coordinates: 50°55′02″N 22°51′37″E
- Country: Poland
- Voivodeship: Lublin
- County: Krasnystaw
- Gmina: Żółkiewka

Wola Żółkiewska [ˈvɔla ʐuu̯ˈkʲɛfska] is a village in the administrative district of Gmina Żółkiewka, within Krasnystaw County, Lublin Voivodeship, in eastern Poland.
