= Dąbie, Krasnystaw County =

Dąbie
- Village
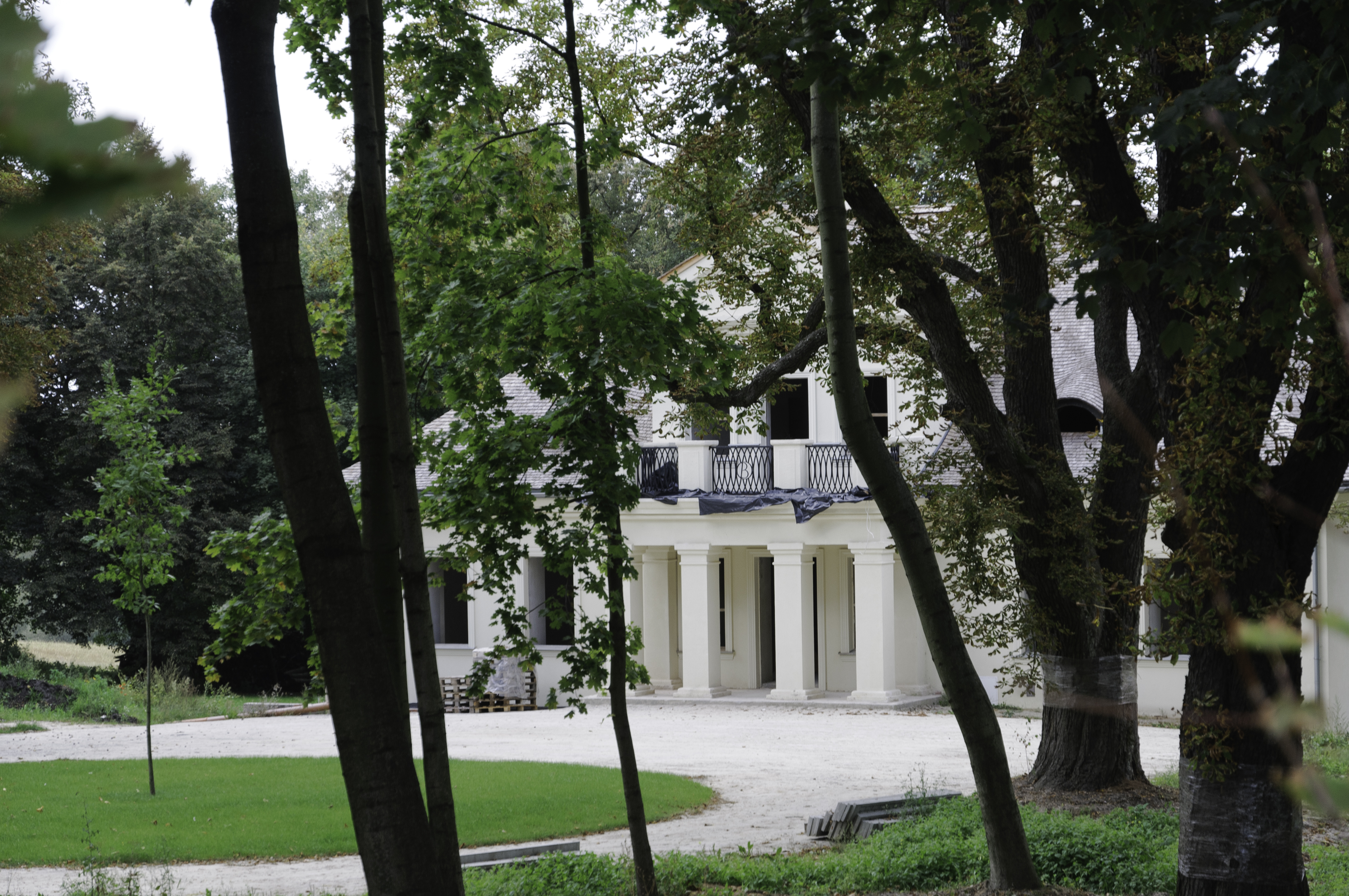
- Manor house in Dąbie

- Location within Poland
- Coordinates: 50°58′08″N 22°49′00″E
- Country: Poland
- Voivodeship: Lublin
- County: Krasnystaw
- Gmina: Żółkiewka

Dąbie [ˈdɔmbjɛ] is a village in the administrative district of Gmina Żółkiewka, within Krasnystaw County, Lublin Voivodeship, in eastern Poland.
