= Gany =

- Village
- Location within Poland
- Coordinates: 50°53′4″N 22°53′9″E
- Country: Poland
- Voivodeship: Lublin
- County: Krasnystaw
- Gmina: Żółkiewka

Gany [ˈɡanɨ] is a village in the administrative district of Gmina Żółkiewka, within Krasnystaw County, Lublin Voivodeship, in eastern Poland.
