= Siniec, Lublin Voivodeship =

Siniec
- Village
- Location within Poland
- Coordinates: 50°56′33″N 22°50′37″E
- Country: Poland
- Voivodeship: Lublin
- County: Krasnystaw
- Gmina: Żółkiewka

Siniec [ˈɕiɲɛt͡s] is a village in the administrative district of Gmina Żółkiewka, within Krasnystaw County, Lublin Voivodeship, in eastern Poland.
