= Zaburze, Krasnystaw County =

Zaburze
- Village
- Location within Poland
- Coordinates: 50°54′25″N 22°50′29″E
- Country: Poland
- Voivodeship: Lublin
- County: Krasnystaw
- Gmina: Żółkiewka

Zaburze [zaˈbuʐɛ] is a village in the administrative district of Gmina Żółkiewka, within Krasnystaw County, Lublin Voivodeship, in eastern Poland.
