= Nowiny, Krasnystaw County =

Nowiny
- Village
- Location within Poland
- Coordinates: 51°00′36″N 22°58′28″E
- Country: Poland
- Voivodeship: Lublin
- County: Krasnystaw
- Gmina: Łopiennik Górny

Nowiny [nɔˈvinɨ] is a village in the administrative district of Gmina Łopiennik Górny, within Krasnystaw County, Lublin Voivodeship, in eastern Poland.
