= Łopiennik Dolny-Kolonia =

- Village
- Location within Poland
- Coordinates: 51°03′54″N 23°01′38″E
- Country: Poland
- Voivodeship: Lublin
- County: Krasnystaw
- Gmina: Łopiennik Górny

Łopiennik Dolny-Kolonia [wɔˈpjɛnnik ˈdɔlnɨ kɔˈlɔɲa] is a village in the administrative district of Gmina Łopiennik Górny, within Krasnystaw County, Lublin Voivodeship, in eastern Poland.
