= Wirkowice Pierwsze =

- Village
- Location within Poland
- Coordinates: 50°52′24″N 23°05′45″E
- Country: Poland
- Voivodeship: Lublin
- County: Krasnystaw
- Gmina: Izbica

Wirkowice Pierwsze [virkɔˈvit͡sɛ ˈpjɛrfʂɛ] is a village in the administrative district of Gmina Izbica, within Krasnystaw County, Lublin Voivodeship, in eastern Poland.
