= Borówek-Kolonia =

- Village
- Location within Poland
- Coordinates: 50°54′21″N 22°54′43″E
- Country: Poland
- Voivodeship: Lublin
- County: Krasnystaw
- Gmina: Żółkiewka

Borówek-Kolonia [bɔˈruvɛk kɔˈlɔɲa] is a village in the administrative district of Gmina Żółkiewka, within Krasnystaw County, Lublin Voivodeship, in eastern Poland.
