= Franciszek Siarczyński =

Polish writer (1758–1829)

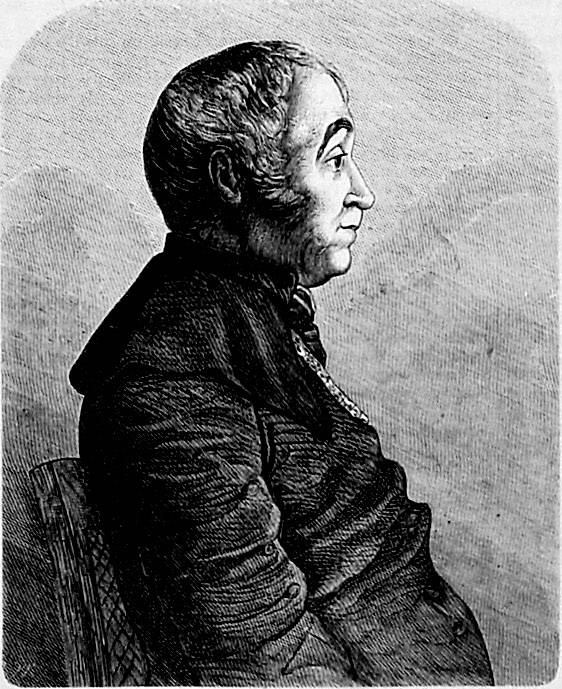
- Occupation: Catholic priest
- Known for: Director of the National Library of the Ossolineum

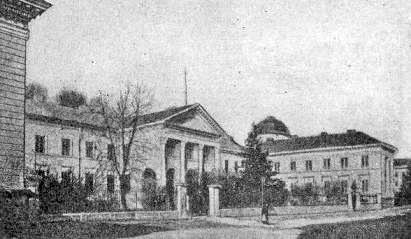
The former building of the Ossolineum Institute in Lwów, now Ukraine

Franciszek Siarczyński (1758–1829) was a Polish Roman Catholic priest, member of the Piarist religious order, historian, geographer, teacher, writer and publicist.

He was a lecturer of grammar, history and geography at the Collegium Nobilium in Warsaw, Poland from 1781 to 1785. He was a regular guest at the Thursday Dinners held by the King of Poland, Stanisław August Poniatowski in the era of the Enlightenment in Poland. He was the author of three volumes of Geografii, czyli opisania naturalnego, historycznego i politycznego krajów i narodów (Geography, natural history, history and politics of the country and its citizens).

At the time of the Kościuszko Uprising in 1794, he wrote for the Gazeta Wolna Warszawska (The Free Warsaw Gazette).

He collected material for the Słownik historyczno-statystyczno-geograficzny Galicji (The Dictionary of history, statistics and geography of Galicia), which was published in parts from 1857 as a weekly supplement Rozmaitości in the Gazeta Lwowska (Lwów Gazette).

After the transfer of the Ossoliński family's collection of books, from Vienna to Lwów, in 1827, he became the first director of the National Library of the Ossolineum, from 1827 to 1829.

His religious posts included being the Parish Priest in Jarosław, the Cathedral Canon in Warsaw and Przemyśl and the Prior in Kozieniec (1789) and Łańcut (1799).
