= Rudnik-Romanówek =

- Village
- Location within Poland
- Coordinates: 50°52′15″N 22°58′22″E
- Country: Poland
- Voivodeship: Lublin
- County: Krasnystaw
- Gmina: Rudnik
- Time zone: UTC+1 (CET)
  - Summer (DST): UTC+2 (CEST)

Rudnik-Romanówek (Polish pronunciation: [ˈrudɲik rɔmaˈnuvɛk]) is a village in the administrative district of Gmina Rudnik, within Krasnystaw County, Lublin Voivodeship, in eastern Poland.

== History ==
Seven Polish citizens were murdered by Nazi Germany in the village during World War II.
