= Bzowiec, Lublin Voivodeship =

Bzowiec
- Village
- Location within Poland
- Coordinates: 50°50′N 22°56′E
- Country: Poland
- Voivodeship: Lublin
- County: Krasnystaw
- Gmina: Rudnik

Bzowiec [ˈbzɔvjɛt͡s] is a village in the administrative district of Gmina Rudnik, within Krasnystaw County, Lublin Voivodeship, in eastern Poland.
