= Zalesie, Gmina Izbica =

Zalesie
- Village
- Location within Poland
- Coordinates: 50°52′47″N 23°10′50″E
- Country: Poland
- Voivodeship: Lublin
- County: Krasnystaw
- Gmina: Izbica

Zalesie [zaˈlɛɕɛ] is a village in the administrative district of Gmina Izbica, within Krasnystaw County, Lublin Voivodeship, in eastern Poland.
