= Boruń =

- Village
- Location within Poland
- Coordinates: 50°58′44″N 23°21′32″E
- Country: Poland
- Voivodeship: Lublin
- County: Krasnystaw
- Gmina: Siennica Różana

Boruń [ˈbɔruɲ] is a village in the administrative district of Gmina Siennica Różana, within Krasnystaw County, Lublin Voivodeship, in eastern Poland.
