= Koszarsko =

- Village
- Location within Poland
- Coordinates: 50°52′N 22°51′E
- Country: Poland
- Voivodeship: Lublin
- County: Krasnystaw
- Gmina: Żółkiewka

Koszarsko [kɔˈʂarskɔ] is a village in the administrative district of Gmina Żółkiewka, within Krasnystaw County, Lublin Voivodeship, in eastern Poland.
