= Majdan Wierzchowiński =

- Village
- Location within Poland
- Coordinates: 50°52′N 22°51′E
- Country: Poland
- Voivodeship: Lublin
- County: Krasnystaw
- Gmina: Żółkiewka

Majdan Wierzchowiński (Polish pronunciation: [ˈmajdan vjɛʂxɔˈvij̃skʲi]) is a village in the administrative district of Gmina Żółkiewka, within Krasnystaw County, Lublin Voivodeship, in eastern Poland.
