= Celin =

- Village
- Location within Poland
- Coordinates: 50°57′01″N 22°51′27″E
- Country: Poland
- Voivodeship: Lublin
- County: Krasnystaw
- Gmina: Żółkiewka

Celin [ˈt͡sɛlin] is a village in the administrative district of Gmina Żółkiewka, within Krasnystaw County, Lublin Voivodeship, in eastern Poland.
