= Wierzchowina, Lublin Voivodeship =

Wierzchowina
- Village
- Location within Poland
- Coordinates: 50°51′N 22°51′E
- Country: Poland
- Voivodeship: Lublin
- County: Krasnystaw
- Gmina: Żółkiewka

Wierzchowina [vjɛʂxɔˈvina] is a village in the administrative district of Gmina Żółkiewka, within Krasnystaw County, Lublin Voivodeship, in eastern Poland.
