= Ostrówek, Krasnystaw County =

Ostrówek
- Village
- Location within Poland
- Coordinates: 50°53′51″N 23°04′54″E
- Country: Poland
- Voivodeship: Lublin
- County: Krasnystaw
- Gmina: Izbica

Ostrówek [ɔsˈtruvɛk] is a village in the administrative district of Gmina Izbica, within Krasnystaw County, Lublin Voivodeship, in eastern Poland.
