= Stary Majdan =

Stary Majdan may refer to the following places:

- Stary Majdan, Gmina Wojsławice in Lublin Voivodeship (east Poland)
- Stary Majdan, Gmina Rejowiec in Lublin Voivodeship (east Poland)
- Stary Majdan, Podlaskie Voivodeship (north-east Poland)
- Stary Majdan, Włodawa County in Lublin Voivodeship (east Poland)
