= Łopiennik Nadrzeczny =

- Village
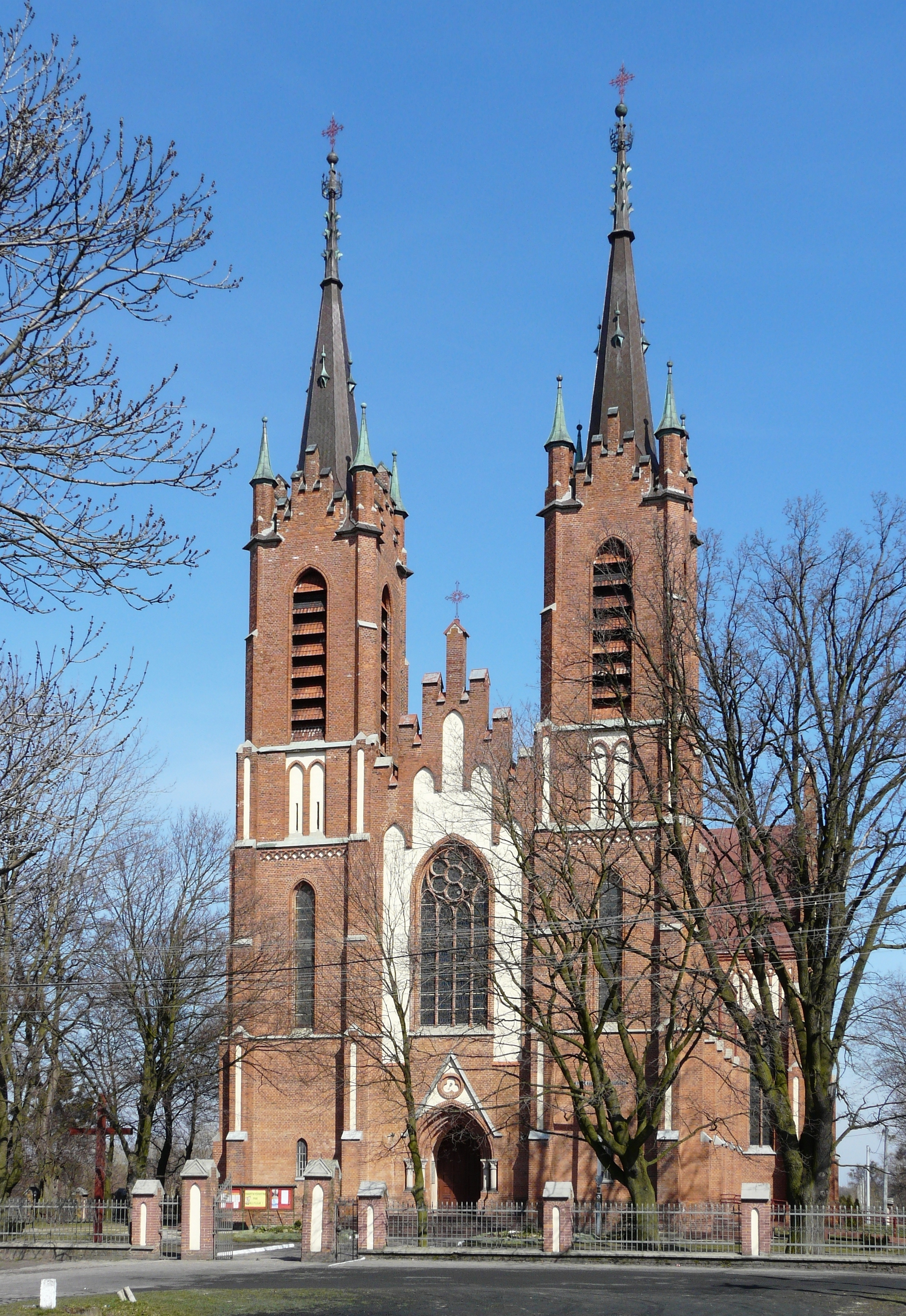
- Saint Bartholomew church in Łopiennik Nadrzeczny

- Location within Poland
- Coordinates: 51°02′56″N 23°02′23″E
- Country: Poland
- Voivodeship: Lublin
- County: Krasnystaw
- Gmina: Łopiennik Górny
- Time zone: UTC+1 (CET)
  - Summer (DST): UTC+2 (CEST)

Łopiennik Nadrzeczny [wɔˈpjɛnnik naˈdʐɛt͡ʂnɨ] is a village in the administrative district of Gmina Łopiennik Górny, within Krasnystaw County, Lublin Voivodeship, in eastern Poland.

== History ==
Five Polish citizens were murdered by Nazi Germany in the village during World War II.
