= Średnia Wieś, Lublin Voivodeship =

Średnia Wieś
- Village
- Location within Poland
- Coordinates: 50°54′N 22°50′E
- Country: Poland
- Voivodeship: Lublin
- County: Krasnystaw
- Gmina: Żółkiewka

Średnia Wieś [ˈɕrɛdɲa ˈvjɛɕ] is a village in the administrative district of Gmina Żółkiewka, within Krasnystaw County, Lublin Voivodeship, in eastern Poland.
