= Siedliska, Krasnystaw County =

Siedliska
- Village
- Location within Poland
- Coordinates: 51°3′28″N 22°55′52″E
- Country: Poland
- Voivodeship: Lublin
- County: Krasnystaw
- Gmina: Fajsławice
- Population: 520

Siedliska [ɕɛdˈlʲiska] is a village in the administrative district of Gmina Fajsławice, within Krasnystaw County, Lublin Voivodeship, in eastern Poland.
