= Gmina Rejowiec =

Gmina Rejowiec Rejowiec Commune
- Gmina
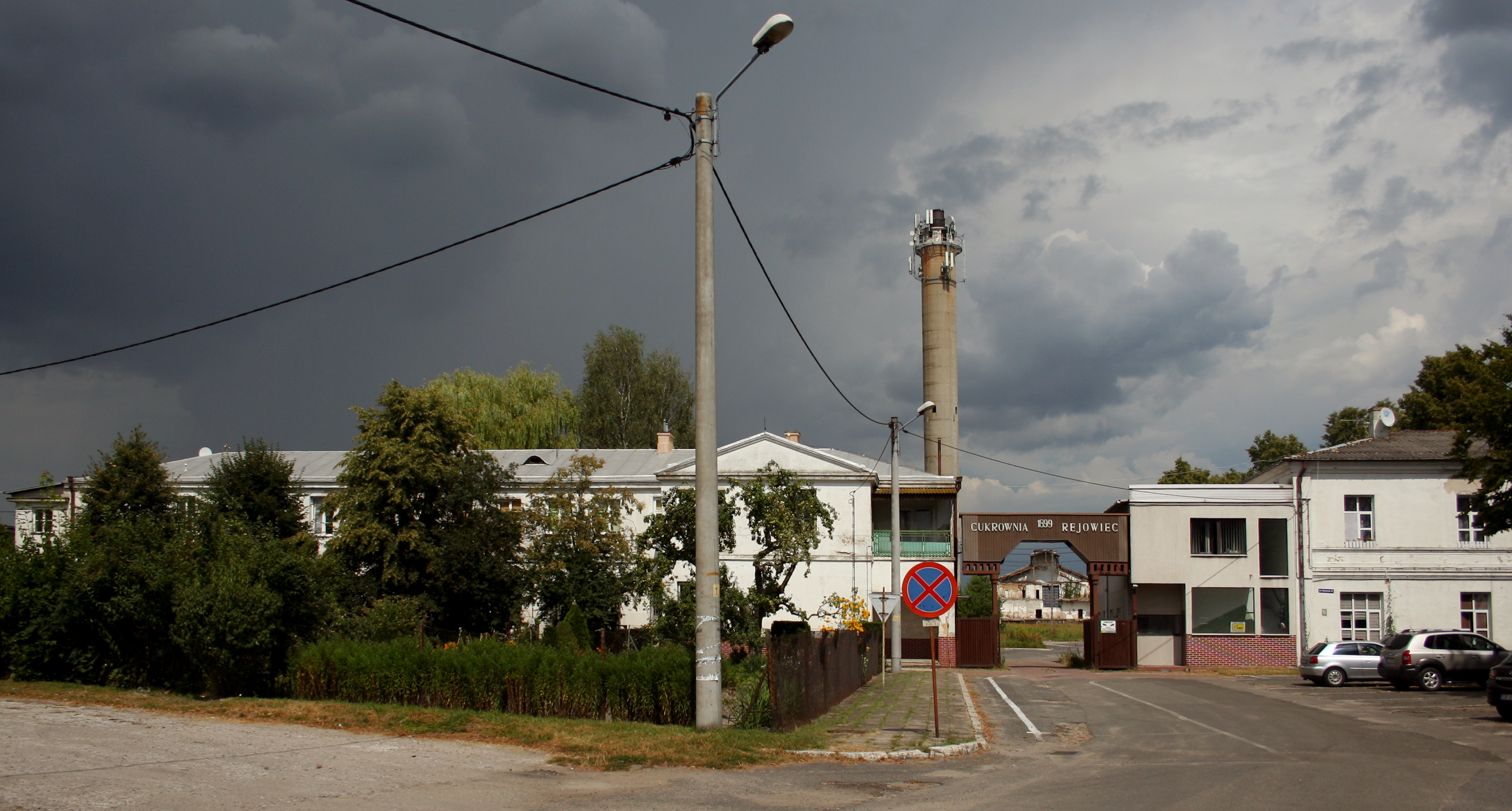

- Coat of arms

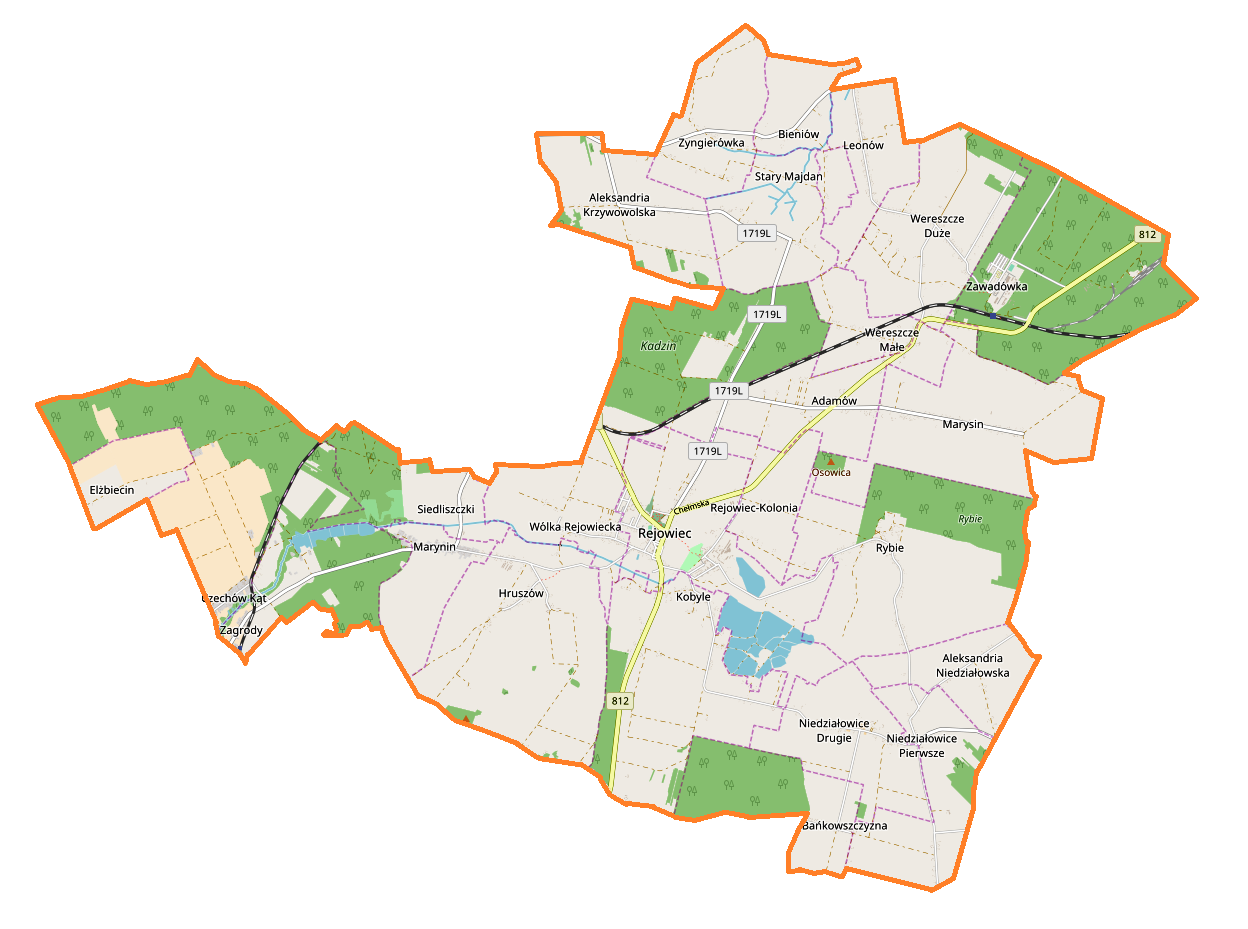
- Coordinates (Rejowiec): 51°5′N 23°16′E
- Country: Poland
- Voivodeship: Lublin
- County: Chełm County
- Seat: Rejowiec

Area
  - Total: 106.25 km^{2} (41.02 sq mi)

Population (2006)
  - Total: 6,695
  - Density: 63.01/km^{2} (163.2/sq mi)
- Website: http://www.gmina.rejowiec.pl

Gmina Rejowiec is an urban-rural gmina (administrative district) in Chełm County, Lublin Voivodeship, in eastern Poland. Its seat is the village of Rejowiec, which lies approximately 17 kilometres (11 mi) south-west of Chełm and 52 km (32 mi) east of the regional capital Lublin. It was formerly in Krasnystaw County, but was transferred to Chełm County in 2006.

The gmina covers an area of 106.25 square kilometres (41.0 sq mi), and as of 2006 its total population is 6,695.

== Villages ==
Gmina Rejowiec contains the villages and settlements of Adamów, Aleksandria Krzywowolska, Aleksandria Niedziałowska, Bańkowszczyzna, Bieniów, Czechów Kąt, Elżbiecin, Hruszów, Kobyle, Leonów, Marynin, Marysin, Niedziałowice Drugie, Niedziałowice Pierwsze, Niemirów, Rejowiec, Rybie, Siedliszczki, Stary Majdan, Wereszcze Duże, Wereszcze Małe, Wólka Rejowiecka, Zagrody, Zawadówka and Zyngierówka.

== Neighbouring gminas ==
Gmina Rejowiec is bordered by the town of Rejowiec Fabryczny and by the gminas of Chełm, Krasnystaw, Łopiennik Górny, Rejowiec Fabryczny and Siennica Różana.
