= Aleksandria Niedziałowska =

- Village
- Location within Poland
- Coordinates: 51°5′N 23°21′E
- Country: Poland
- Voivodeship: Lublin
- County: Chełm
- Gmina: Rejowiec

Population
  - Total: 190

Aleksandria Niedziałowska [alɛkˈsandrja ɲɛd͡ʑaˈwɔfska] is a village in the administrative district of Gmina Rejowiec, within Chełm County, Lublin Voivodeship, in eastern Poland.
