= Gmina Izbica =

Gmina Izbica Izbica Commune
- Gmina
- Coat of arms
- Interactive map of Gmina Izbica
- Coordinates (Izbica): 50°53′40″N 23°10′30″E
- Country: Poland
- Voivodeship: Lublin
- County: Krasnystaw
- Seat: Izbica

Area
  - Total: 138.66 km^{2} (53.54 sq mi)

Population (2006)
  - Total: 8,942
  - Density: 64.49/km^{2} (167.0/sq mi)
- Website: https://web.archive.org/web/20080505035637/http://www.izbica.ug.mbnet.pl/

Gmina Izbica is a rural gmina (administrative district) in Krasnystaw County, Lublin Voivodeship, in eastern Poland. Its seat is the town of Izbica, which lies approximately 12 kilometres (7 mi) south of Krasnystaw and 58 km (36 mi) south-east of the regional capital Lublin.

The gmina covers an area of 138.66 square kilometres (53.5 sq mi), and as of 2006 its total population is 8,942.

The gmina contains part of the protected area called Skierbieszów Landscape Park.

== Villages ==
Gmina Izbica contains the villages and settlements of Bobliwo, Dworzyska, Izbica, Kryniczki, Majdan Krynicki, Mchy, Orłów Drewniany, Orłów Drewniany-Kolonia, Orłów Murowany, Orłów Murowany-Kolonia, Ostrówek, Ostrzyca, Romanów, Stryjów, Tarnogóra, Tarnogóra-Kolonia, Tarzymiechy Drugie, Tarzymiechy Pierwsze, Tarzymiechy Trzecie, Topola, Wał, Wirkowice Drugie, Wirkowice Pierwsze, Wólka Orłowska and Zalesie.

== Neighbouring gminas ==
Gmina Izbica is bordered by the gminas of Gorzków, Kraśniczyn, Krasnystaw, Nielisz, Rudnik, Skierbieszów and Stary Zamość.

== Stolpersteine, Winterlingen ==
- Dr. Emil Burkart (1884–1957), degree in Human Medicin, entomologist about 9.000 Specimens in the State Museum of Natural History Stuttgart
- Selma Burkart (1885–1942), Holocaust victim investigate more detail created the Sister City Izbica/Winterlingen
