= Bańkowszczyzna =

- Village
- Location within Poland
- Coordinates: 51°3′N 23°20′E
- Country: Poland
- Voivodeship: Lublin
- County: Chełm
- Gmina: Rejowiec

Population
  - Total: 70

Bańkowszczyzna [baɲkɔfʂˈt͡ʂɨzna] is a village in the administrative district of Gmina Rejowiec, within Chełm County, Lublin Voivodeship, in eastern Poland.
