= Elżbiecin, Chełm County =

Elżbiecin
- Village
- Location within Poland
- Coordinates: 51°6′1″N 23°9′52″E
- Country: Poland
- Voivodeship: Lublin
- County: Chełm
- Gmina: Rejowiec

Elżbiecin [ɛlʐˈbjɛt͡ɕin] is a village in the administrative district of Gmina Rejowiec, within Chełm County, Lublin Voivodeship, in eastern Poland. It is approximately 8 km (5 mi) west of Rejowiec, 23 km (14 mi) west of Chełm, and 45 km (28 mi) east of the regional capital Lublin.
