= Gmina Żółkiewka =

Gmina Żółkiewka Żółkiewka Commune
- Gmina
- Coat of arms
- Interactive map of Gmina Żółkiewka
- Coordinates (Żółkiewka): 50°54′N 22°50′E
- Country: Poland
- Voivodeship: Lublin
- County: Krasnystaw
- Seat: Żółkiewka

Area
  - Total: 130.01 km^{2} (50.20 sq mi)

Population (2006)
  - Total: 6,131
  - Density: 47.16/km^{2} (122.1/sq mi)
- Website: http://www.zolkiewka.pl/

Gmina Żółkiewka is a rural gmina (administrative district) in Krasnystaw County, Lublin Voivodeship, in eastern Poland. Its seat is the village of Żółkiewka, which lies approximately 26 kilometres (16 mi) south-west of Krasnystaw and 43 km (27 mi) south-east of the regional capital Lublin.

The gmina covers an area of 130.01 square kilometres (50.2 sq mi), and as of 2006 its total population is 6,131.

== Villages ==
Gmina Żółkiewka contains the villages and settlements of Adamówka, Borówek, Borówek-Kolonia, Celin, Chłaniów, Chłaniów-Kolonia, Chłaniówek, Chruściechów, Dąbie, Gany, Huta, Koszarsko, Majdan Wierzchowiński, Makowiska, Markiewiczów, Olchowiec, Olchowiec-Kolonia, Poperczyn, Rożki, Rożki-Kolonia, Siniec, Średnia Wieś, Tokarówka, Wierzchowina, Władysławin, Wola Żółkiewska, Wólka, Zaburze, Żółkiew-Kolonia and Żółkiewka.

== Neighbouring gminas ==
Gmina Żółkiewka is bordered by the gminas of Gorzków, Krzczonów, Rudnik, Rybczewice, Turobin and Wysokie.
