= Gmina Siennica Różana =

Gmina Siennica Różana Siennica Różana Commune
- Gmina
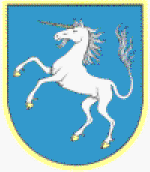
- Coat of arms
- Interactive map of Gmina Siennica Różana
- Coordinates (Siennica Różana): 51°0′2″N 23°18′44″E
- Country: Poland
- Voivodeship: Lublin
- County: Krasnystaw
- Seat: Siennica Różana

Area
  - Total: 98.37 km^{2} (37.98 sq mi)

Population (2006)
  - Total: 4,402
  - Density: 44.75/km^{2} (115.9/sq mi)
- Website: http://www.siennica.pl

Gmina Siennica Różana is a rural gmina (administrative district) in Krasnystaw County, Lublin Voivodeship, in eastern Poland. Its seat is the village of Siennica Różana, which lies approximately 11 kilometres (7 mi) east of Krasnystaw and 59 km (37 mi) south-east of the regional capital Lublin.

The gmina covers an area of 98.37 square kilometres (38.0 sq mi), and as of 2006 its total population is 4,402.

== Villages ==
Gmina Siennica Różana contains the villages and settlements of Baraki, Boruń, Kozieniec, Maciejów, Rudka, Siennica Królewska Duża, Siennica Królewska Mała, Siennica Różana, Stójło, Wierzchowiny, Wola Siennicka, Zagroda, Żdżanne and Zwierzyniec.

== Neighbouring gminas ==
Gmina Siennica Różana is bordered by the town of Krasnystaw and by the gminas of Chełm, Kraśniczyn, Krasnystaw, Leśniowice and Rejowiec.
