= Mościska, Krasnystaw County =

Mościska
- Village
- Location within Poland
- Coordinates: 50°51′25″N 22°56′23″E
- Country: Poland
- Voivodeship: Lublin
- County: Krasnystaw
- Gmina: Rudnik

Mościska [mɔɕˈt͡ɕiska] is a village in the administrative district of Gmina Rudnik, within Krasnystaw County, Lublin Voivodeship, in eastern Poland.
