= Zawadówka, Gmina Rejowiec =

Zawadówka
- Village
- Location within Poland
- Coordinates: 51°7′45″N 23°21′25″E
- Country: Poland
- Voivodeship: Lublin
- County: Chełm
- Gmina: Rejowiec

Zawadówka [zavaˈdufka] is a village in the administrative district of Gmina Rejowiec, within Chełm County, Lublin Voivodeship, in eastern Poland.
