= Gmina Rudnik, Lublin Voivodeship =

Gmina Rudnik Rudnik Commune
- Gmina
- Coat of arms
- Interactive map of Gmina Rudnik
- Coordinates (Rudnik): 50°52′50″N 22°58′18″E
- Country: Poland
- Voivodeship: Lublin
- County: Krasnystaw
- Seat: Rudnik

Area
  - Total: 88.4 km^{2} (34.1 sq mi)

Population (2006)
  - Total: 3,521
  - Density: 39.8/km^{2} (103/sq mi)
- Website: http://www.rudnik.gmina.woi.lublin.pl

Gmina Rudnik is a rural gmina (administrative district) in Krasnystaw County, Lublin Voivodeship, in eastern Poland. Its seat is the village of Rudnik, which lies approximately 20 kilometres (12 mi) south-west of Krasnystaw and 50 km (31 mi) south-east of the regional capital Lublin.

The gmina covers an area of 88.4 square kilometres (34.1 sq mi), and as of 2006 its total population is 3,521.

== Villages ==
Gmina Rudnik contains the villages and settlements of Bzowiec, Joanin, Kaszuby, Majdan Borowski Pierwszy, Majdan Kobylański, Majdan Łuczycki, Majdan Średni, Maszów, Maszów Dolny, Maszów Górny, Międzylas, Mościska, Mościska-Kolonia, Płonka, Płonka Poleśna, Płonka-Kolonia, Potasznia, Równianki, Rudnik, Rudnik-Romanówek, Suche Lipie, Suszeń and Wierzbica.

== Neighbouring gminas ==
Gmina Rudnik is bordered by the gminas of Gorzków, Izbica, Nielisz, Sułów, Turobin and Żółkiewka.
