= Rybie, Lublin Voivodeship =

Rybie
- Village
- Location within Poland
- Coordinates: 51°5′36″N 23°19′45″E
- Country: Poland
- Voivodeship: Lublin
- County: Chełm
- Gmina: Rejowiec

Rybie [ˈrɨbjɛ] is a village in the administrative district of Gmina Rejowiec, within Chełm County, Lublin Voivodeship, in eastern Poland.
