= Kozieniec, Lublin Voivodeship =

Kozieniec
- Village
- Location within Poland
- Coordinates: 51°0′N 23°21′E
- Country: Poland
- Voivodeship: Lublin
- County: Krasnystaw
- Gmina: Siennica Różana

Kozieniec [kɔˈʑɛɲɛt͡s] is a village in the administrative district of Gmina Siennica Różana, within Krasnystaw County, Lublin Voivodeship, in eastern Poland.
