= Adamów, Chełm County =

Adamów
- Village
- Location within Poland
- Coordinates: 51°6′N 23°18′E
- Country: Poland
- Voivodeship: Lublin
- County: Chełm
- Gmina: Rejowiec

Adamów [aˈdamuf] is a village in the administrative district of Gmina Rejowiec, within Chełm County, Lublin Voivodeship, in eastern Poland.
