= Feliksa Fornalska =

Polish communist revolutionary and politician (1893–1987)

- Born: 17 October 1893
- Died: April 1987 (aged 93)
- Occupations: revolutionary and politician

Feliksa Fornalska, also known as Felicja Fornalska (17 October 1893 – April 1987) was a communist revolutionary and politician.

== Biography ==
She was born into a family of revolutionary traditions; the daughter of Antoni and Marcjanna, sister of Małgorzata. From 1921 to 1929 she was a member of the Communist Party of Poland. In 1923, she was sentenced by the District Court in Warsaw to one year in prison for communist activities. In 1929 she emigrated to USSR. From February 1, 1932, to March 1, 1936, she worked at the Comintern in Moscow. In 1937, she was sentenced to 10 years in prison in the USSR. In 1945, she returned to Poland. From 1981 to 1986 she was a member of the Central Committee of the Polish United Workers' Party.

== Awards ==
- Officer's Cross of the Order of Polonia Restituta (1952)
- Order of the Banner of Labour, 2nd class (1954)
