= Leonów, Lublin Voivodeship =

Leonów
- Village
- Location within Poland
- Coordinates: 51°8′53″N 23°19′38″E
- Country: Poland
- Voivodeship: Lublin
- County: Chełm
- Gmina: Rejowiec

Leonów [lɛˈɔnuf] is a village in the administrative district of Gmina Rejowiec, within Chełm County, Lublin Voivodeship, in eastern Poland.
