= Żółkiewka, Lublin Voivodeship =

Żółkiewka
- Village
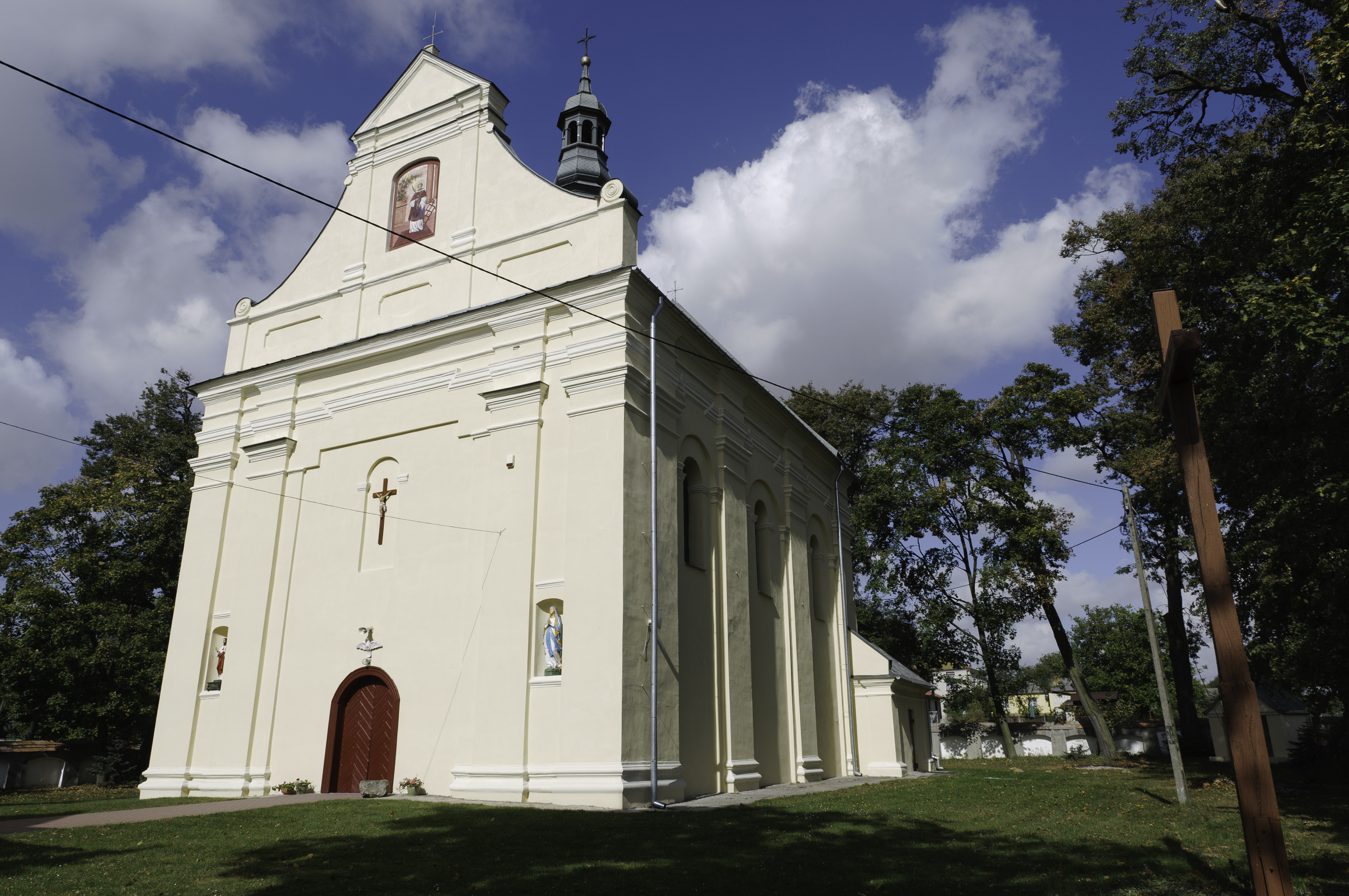
- Church of Saint Lawrence

- Location within Poland
- Coordinates: 50°54′40″N 22°50′3″E
- Country: Poland
- Voivodeship: Lublin
- County: Krasnystaw
- Gmina: Żółkiewka

Population
  - Total: 790
- Time zone: UTC+1 (CET)
  - Summer (DST): UTC+2 (CEST)
- Vehicle registration: LKS

Żółkiewka [ʐuu̯ˈkʲɛfka] is a village in Krasnystaw County, Lublin Voivodeship, in eastern Poland. It is the seat of the gmina (administrative district) called Gmina Żółkiewka.

== History ==
Żółkiewka was founded by the Żółkiewski noble family, whose ancestral seat was the adjacent village of Żółkiew. They also founded the local church. During the Reformation the church passed to Protestants, but was eventually restored to Catholics in 1609.

In 1702 the village received town status, later it acquired its current name. In 1787, it was visited by King Stanisław August Poniatowski during his return journey from Kaniów to Warsaw. In 1868 it lost its town status and reverted to being a village. According to the 1921 census the village had a Jewish community consisting of 1,308 people, or 64.6% of its total population. During World War II, it was occupied by Germany from 1939 to 1944, and the Jewish community perished in the Holocaust, and was not reconstituted afterwards.

== Sights ==
In Żółkiewka, there is a Roman Catholic church of Saint Lawrence with illusionistic monumental paintings (1776) by painter Gabriel Sławiński.
