= Siennica Różana =

- Village
- Location within Poland
- Coordinates: 51°0′2″N 23°18′44″E
- Country: Poland
- Voivodeship: Lublin
- County: Krasnystaw
- Gmina: Siennica Różana
- Population (approx.): 1,000

Siennica Różana [ɕɛnˈnit͡sa ruˈʐana] is a village in Krasnystaw County, Lublin Voivodeship, in eastern Poland. It is the seat of the gmina (administrative district) called Gmina Siennica Różana.
