= Second Battle of Chruślina =

1863 battle

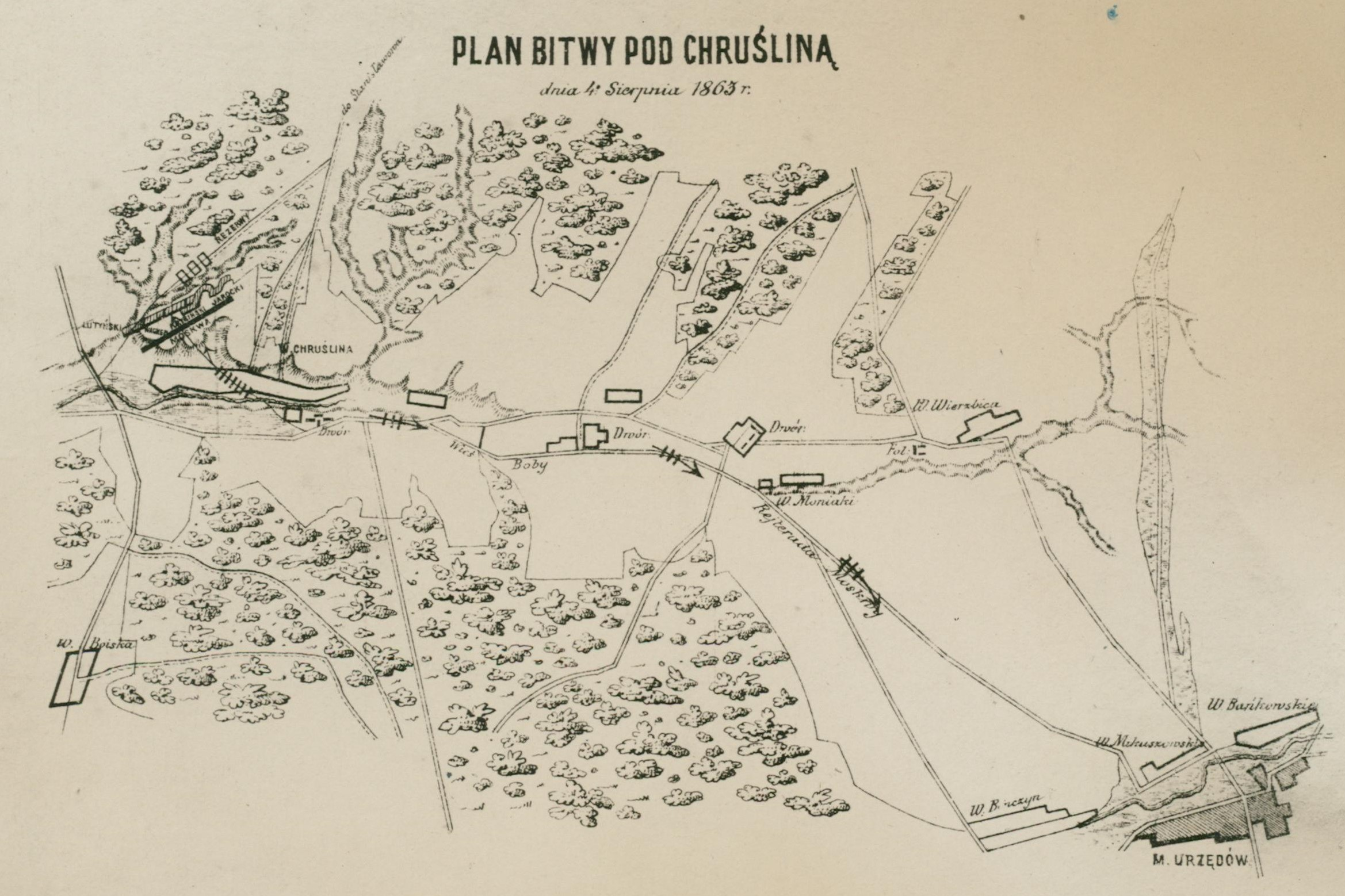
Plan of the Second battle of Chruślina in 1863 by Józef Kościesza-Jaworski (1913)

The Second Battle of Chruślina, one of many clashes of the January Uprising, took place on August 4, 1863, near the village of Chruślina, which at that time belonged to Russian-controlled Congress Poland. An insurgent unit of 1,400 infantry and 200 cavalry under Michał Heydenreich clashed with a 1,300-strong detachment of the Imperial Russian Army. The battle ended in Polish victory, with Polish losses estimated at 2 dead and 30 wounded.

General Michal Heydenreich (nom de guerre Kruk) commanded a large insurgent unit, which however lacked weapons and ammunition. His forces camped at Chruslina, which at that time was located near the border between Congress Poland and Austrian Galicia. When Heydenreich received news of a Russian unit, which approached his camp, he decided to fight the enemy. Polish insurgents formed two lines, and the battle began at 11 a.m. After first Russian attack was repelled, their commandand Mednikov pushed forward all his forces, attacking both Polish wings. Russian assault failed, and at 7 p.m. Mednikov ordered his forces to withdraw. Polish kosynierzy approached the towns of Krasnik and Urzedow, but did not capture them due to lack of ammunition.

== Sources ==
- Stefan Kieniewicz: Powstanie styczniowe. Warszawa: Państwowe Wydawnictwo Naukowe, 1983. ISBN 83-01-03652-4.
