= Niemirów, Chełm County =

Niemirów
- Settlement
- Location within Poland
- Coordinates: 51°10′N 23°20′E
- Country: Poland
- Voivodeship: Lublin
- County: Chełm
- Gmina: Rejowiec

Population
  - Total: 19

Niemirów [ɲɛˈmiruf] is a settlement in the administrative district of Gmina Rejowiec, within Chełm County, Lublin Voivodeship, in eastern Poland.

The locale's designation derives from the Slavic given name Niemir.
