= Gmina Krasnystaw =

Gmina Krasnystaw Krasnystaw Commune
- Gmina
- Flag Coat of arms
- Interactive map of Gmina Krasnystaw
- Coordinates (Krasnystaw): 51°0′N 23°10′E
- Country: Poland
- Voivodeship: Lublin
- County: Krasnystaw
- Seat: Krasnystaw

Area
  - Total: 150.96 km^{2} (58.29 sq mi)

Population (2006)
  - Total: 9,142
  - Density: 60.56/km^{2} (156.8/sq mi)
- Website: https://www.krasnystaw.ug.gov.pl/

Gmina Krasnystaw is a rural gmina (administrative district) in Krasnystaw County, Lublin Voivodeship, in eastern Poland. Its seat is the town of Krasnystaw, although the town is not part of the territory of the gmina.

The gmina covers an area of 150.96 square kilometres (58.3 sq mi), and as of 2006 its total population is 9,142.

The gmina contains part of the protected area called Skierbieszów Landscape Park.

== Villages ==
Gmina Krasnystaw contains the villages and settlements of Bzite, Czarnoziem, Jaślików, Józefów, Kasjan, Krupe, Krupiec, Krynica, Latyczów, Małochwiej Duży, Małochwiej Mały, Niemienice, Niemienice-Kolonia, Ostrów Krupski, Rońsko, Siennica Nadolna; Białka, Łany, Stężyca Łęczyńska, Stężyca Nadwieprzańska, Stężyca-Kolonia, Tuligłowy, Widniówka, Wincentów, Zakręcie, Zastawie-Kolonia and Zażółkiew.

== Neighbouring gminas ==
Gmina Krasnystaw is bordered by the town of Krasnystaw and by the gminas of Gorzków, Izbica, Kraśniczyn, Łopiennik Górny, Rejowiec and Siennica Różana.
