= Wereszcze Duże =

- Village
- Location within Poland
- Coordinates: 51°8′15″N 23°20′34″E
- Country: Poland
- Voivodeship: Lublin
- County: Chełm
- Gmina: Rejowiec

Population
  - Total: 440

Wereszcze Duże [vɛˈrɛʂt͡ʂɛ ˈduʐɛ] is a village in the administrative district of Gmina Rejowiec, within Chełm County, Lublin Voivodeship, in eastern Poland.
