= Fajsławice =

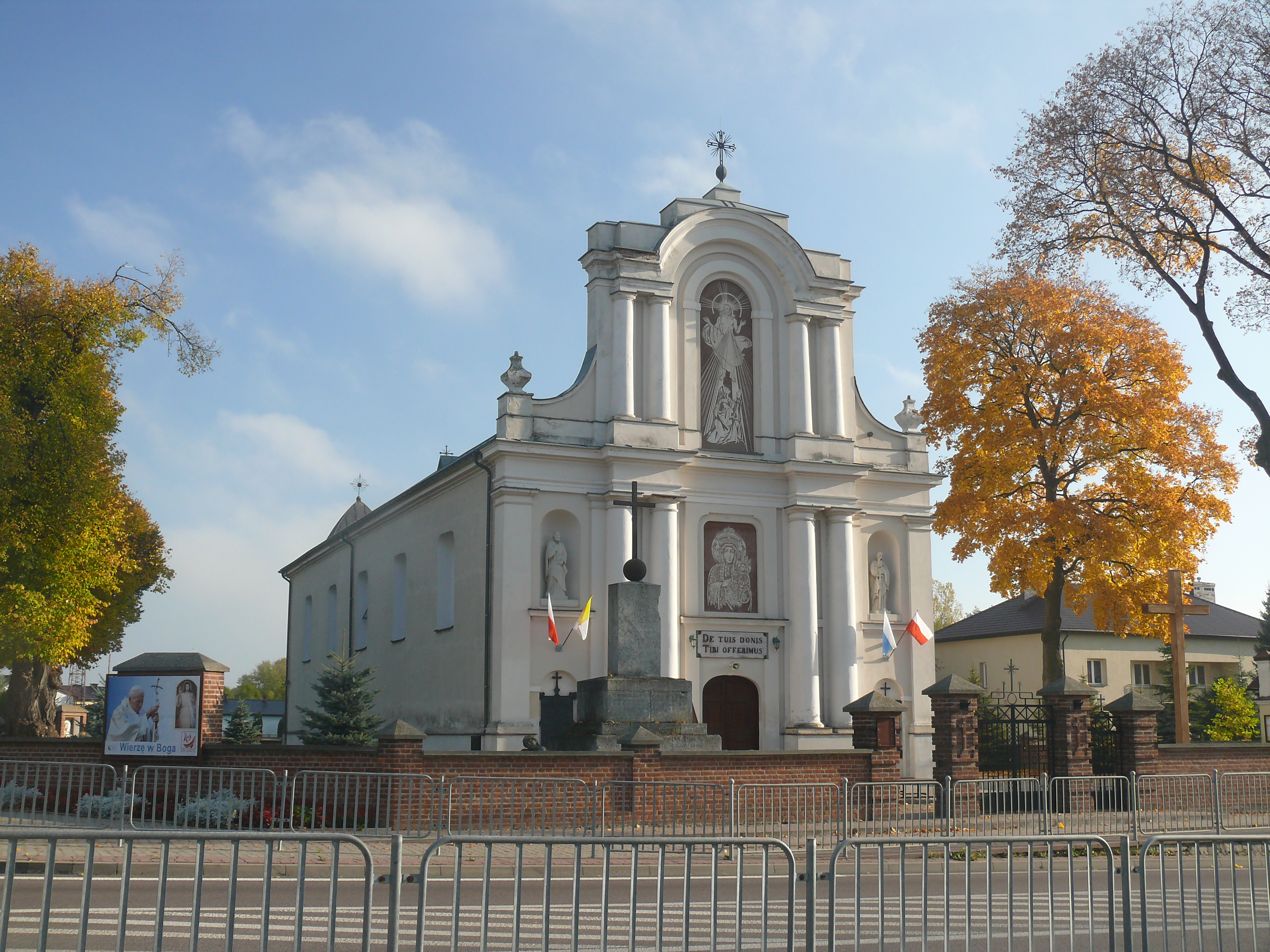
- Church of Saint John of Nepomuk

- Coat of arms

- Location within Poland
- Coordinates: 51°6′N 22°57′E
- Country: Poland
- Voivodeship: Lublin
- County: Krasnystaw
- Gmina: Fajsławice

Population
  - Total: 1,457
- Time zone: UTC+1 (CET)
  - Summer (DST): UTC+2 (CEST)

Fajsławice [fai̯swaˈvit͡sɛ] is a village in Krasnystaw County, Lublin Voivodeship, in eastern Poland. It is the seat of the gmina (administrative district) called Gmina Fajsławice.

== History ==
The Battle of Fajsławice took place in the village during the January Uprising in 1863.

Four Polish citizens were murdered by Nazi Germany in the village during World War II.
