= Małgorzata Fornalska =

Polish anti-Nazi resistance fighter (1902–1944)

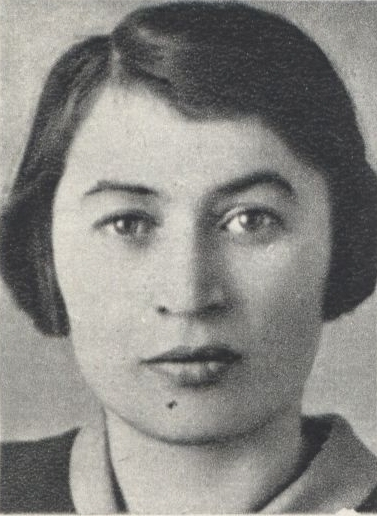
- Portrait of Fornalska from a publication by Władysław Bartoszewski
- Born: 8 June 1902; Boniewo, Lublin Governorate, Congress Poland
- Died: 26 July 1944 (aged 42); Warschau, General Government
- Other name: Maria Jasińska
- Education: Sverdlov Communist University; International Lenin School
- Era: 20th century
- Organization: Polrewkom
- Political party: PPR
- Other political affiliations: SDKPiL; RKP(b); KPP
- Movement: Communism
- Partner: Bolesław Bierut
- Children: Aleksandra Jasińska-Kania
- Parents: Antoni (father); Marcjanna née Starzyńska (mother)
- Awards: Order of the Cross of Grunwald
- Military engagements
- Allegiance: Soviet Union
- Branch: 10th Army
- Service years: 1918 then 1939–1944
- Nickname: Jasia
- Wars: Russian Civil War; World War II

Małgorzata Fornalska (pseudonym: Jasia; 8 June 1902 – 26 July 1944) was a Polish communist activist and anti-Nazi resistance fighter.

== Biography ==
Fornalska was born in Boniewo to a family of communist activists; the sister of Feliksa. From 1918, she was a member of the Social Democracy of the Kingdom of Poland and Lithuania and the Russian Communist Party (Bolsheviks) as well as the Communist Party of Poland. From July to December 1918, she worked at orphanages in Saratov and Petrovsk.

In January 1920, Fornalska returned to Poland and worked for the Provisional Polish Revolutionary Committee together with her brother Aleksander. Later, she studied at the Sverdlov Communist University and the International Lenin School in Moscow.

Fornalska was arrested and imprisoned several times for her communist activity, the first time in 1922 in Poland and then several times in the 1930s. After being released in 1939, she went to the Soviet Union, where she worked with other exiled Polish communists. In the spring of 1942, she was parachuted into Poland, then occupied by Nazi Germany, to organise the communist resistance against the occupation. She was elected to the Central Committee of the newly formed Polish Workers' Party and worked as one of the editors of the party's newspaper, Trybuna Wolności.

On 14 November 1943, Fornalska was arrested by the Gestapo and imprisoned in Serbia Prison. She was executed by the Germans in the ruins of the Warsaw Ghetto on 26 July 1944.

Posthumously, Fornalska was awarded the Order of the Cross of Grunwald, 1st class, in 1948.
