= Zagrody, Chełm County =

Zagrody
- Village
- Location within Poland
- Coordinates: 51°5′2″N 23°11′28″E
- Country: Poland
- Voivodeship: Lublin
- County: Chełm
- Gmina: Rejowiec

Zagrody [zaˈɡrɔdɨ] is a village in the administrative district of Gmina Rejowiec, within Chełm County, Lublin Voivodeship, in eastern Poland.
