= Marysin, Chełm County =

Marysin
- Village
- Location within Poland
- Coordinates: 51°6′35″N 23°20′56″E
- Country: Poland
- Voivodeship: Lublin
- County: Chełm
- Gmina: Rejowiec

Marysin [maˈrɨɕin] is a village in the administrative district of Gmina Rejowiec, within Chełm County, Lublin Voivodeship, in eastern Poland.
