= Łopiennik Podleśny =

- Village
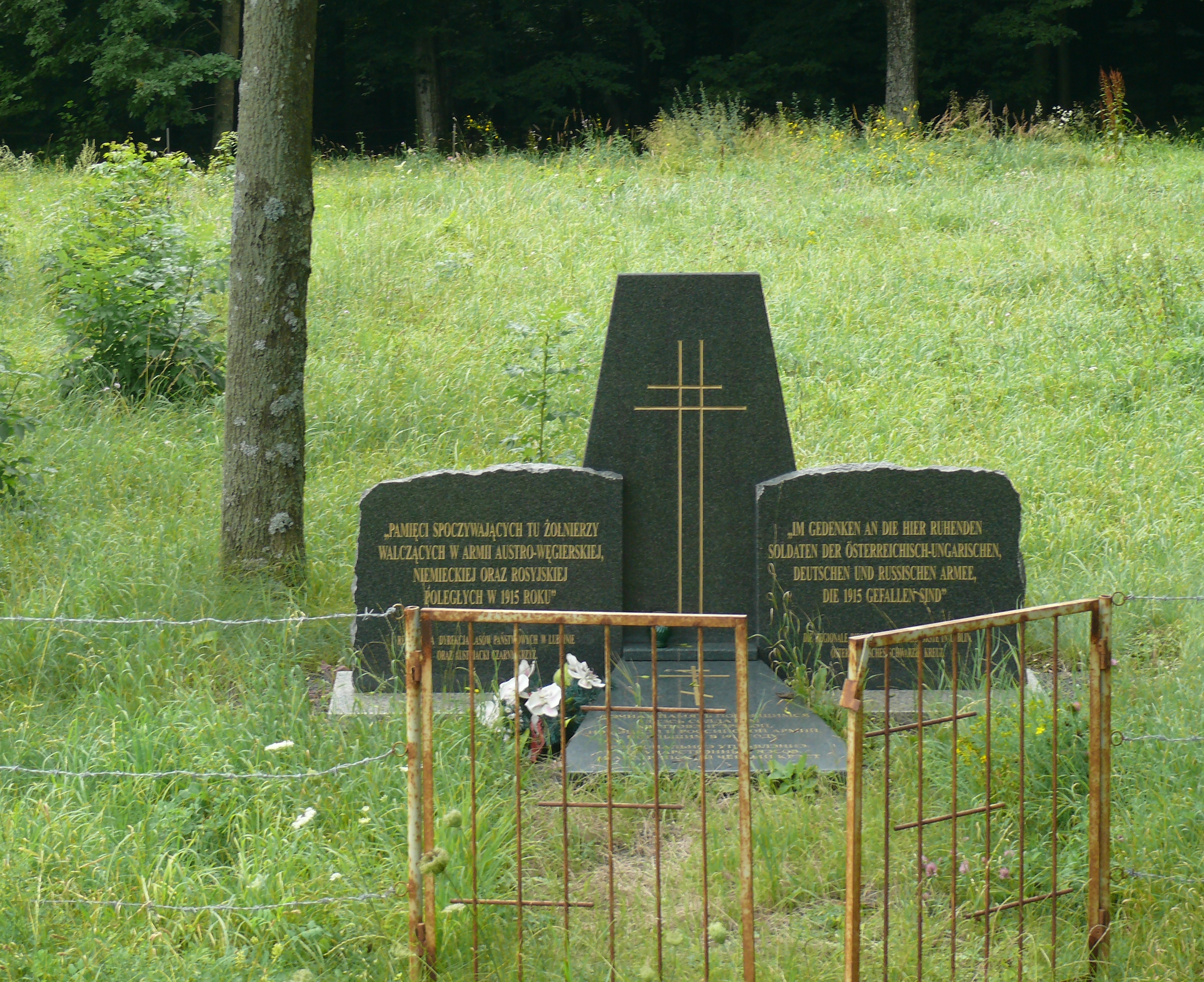

- Location within Poland
- Coordinates: 51°03′11″N 23°04′55″E
- Country: Poland
- Voivodeship: Lublin
- County: Krasnystaw
- Gmina: Łopiennik Górny

Łopiennik Podleśny [wɔˈpjɛnnik pɔdˈlɛɕnɨ] is a village in the administrative district of Gmina Łopiennik Górny, within Krasnystaw County, Lublin Voivodeship, in eastern Poland.
