= Michał Heydenreich =

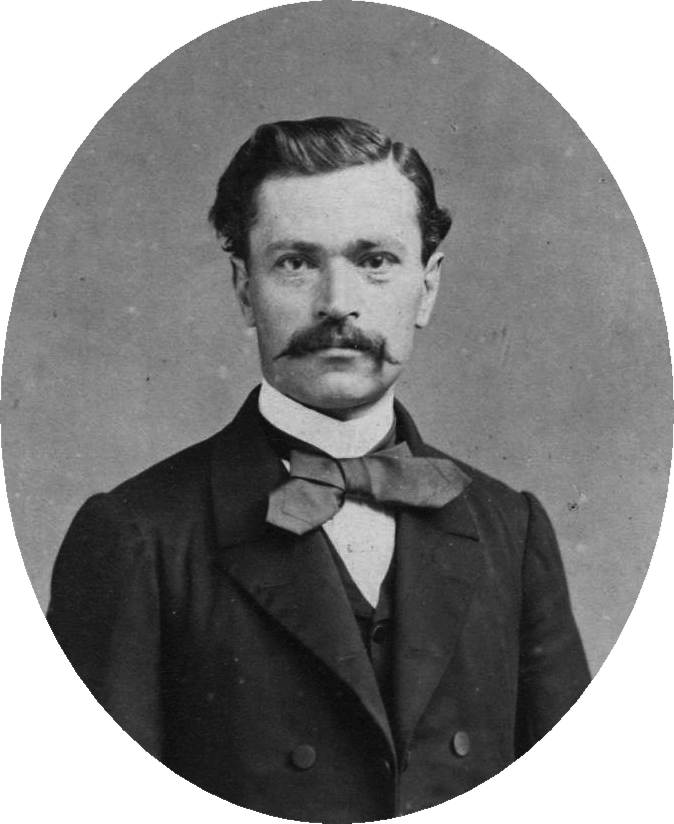
Michał Heydenreich

Michał Jan Heydenreich (Heidenreich), also known under the pseudonym Kruk (19 September 1831, Warsaw, Russian Empire – 9 April 1886, Lviv), was a Polish general who took part in the January Uprising. He was a Podpolkovnik in the Russian Imperial Army.

A native of Warsaw, Heydenreich was the son of Polonized German and French citizens. He graduated from the General Staff Academy in St. Petersburg, Russia. In 1862, as a lieutenant colonel, he went to the staff of 2 Cavalry Division, stationed in the so-called Congress Poland. He was a member of the underground Polish Circle Officers founded by Zygmunt Sierakowski in St. Petersburg. He joined the War Department of the Central National Committee.

After the outbreak of the January Uprising in the summer of 1863, he was appointed head of the martial provinces of Podlasie and Lublin. He subjugated smaller parties of insurgents. His unit, after losing the 24 July Battle of Kaniwola, won a victory in the Second Battle of Chruślina on 4 August, and on 8 August, led the Battle of Żyrzyn, where he attacked a Russian convoy carrying 200,000 rubles guarded by 550 soldiers and 2 runs. He took numerous prisoners, and took all but 60,000 of the rubles. It was the biggest victory for the Poles in the uprising. The National Government appointed Heidenreich Colonel General on 22 August 1863. He was defeated in the Battle of Fajsławice two days later. After the failures, he retreated to Galicia. He stood at the head of the grouping, which was cut from Galicia, from Volhynia to Lublin. However, on 1 November, he attempted to disperse his troops at Poryck, but failed to carry out this operation. His staff and a small escort, a Krakusi, went to Lublin. There, he gathered the scattered forces; however, on 25 December, they were finally defeated in the Battle of Kock.

In March 1864, Heydenreich was imprisoned in a local jail in Gostyń; he was freed in a daring rescue by a Jewish physician Eliasz Wachtel, an episode described in an article by Polish painter Władysław Stachowski.

During the reorganization of the army by the insurgent Romuald Traugutt, Heydenreich was scheduled to command the first body, but the collapse of the uprising made him flee to France and then to Great Britain. He took part in the Franco-Prussian War from 1870 to 1871. In 1872, he was part of the launch of the Paris Masonic Lodge. He soon settled in Lviv, where he ran a craft workshop. There he died, and was buried in Lychakiv Cemetery.
