= Zyngierówka =

- Village
- Location within Poland
- Coordinates: 51°8′59″N 23°17′32″E
- Country: Poland
- Voivodeship: Lublin
- County: Chełm
- Gmina: Rejowiec

Zyngierówka [zɨŋɡʲɛˈrufka] is a village in the administrative district of Gmina Rejowiec, within Chełm County, Lublin Voivodeship, in eastern Poland.

== History ==
From 1975 to 1998, the village was administratively attached to the Chełm Voivodeship. Since 1999, it has been part of the Lublin Voivodeship.
