= Mchy, Lublin Voivodeship =

Mchy
- Village
- Location within Poland
- Coordinates: 50°56′N 23°5′E
- Country: Poland
- Voivodeship: Lublin
- County: Krasnystaw
- Gmina: Izbica

Mchy [mxɨ] is a village in the administrative district of Gmina Izbica, within Krasnystaw County, Lublin Voivodeship, in eastern Poland.
