= Kobyle, Lublin Voivodeship =

Kobyle
- Village
- Location within Poland
- Coordinates: 51°2′12″N 23°17′14″E
- Country: Poland
- Voivodeship: Lublin
- County: Chełm
- Gmina: Rejowiec

Kobyle [kɔˈbɨlɛ] is a village in the administrative district of Gmina Rejowiec, within Chełm County, Lublin Voivodeship, in eastern Poland.
