= Czechów Kąt =

- Village
- Location within Poland
- Coordinates: 51°5′6″N 23°11′11″E
- Country: Poland
- Voivodeship: Lublin
- County: Chełm
- Gmina: Rejowiec

Czechów Kąt [ˈt͡ʂɛxuf ˈkɔnt] is a village in the administrative district of Gmina Rejowiec, within Chełm County, Lublin Voivodeship, in eastern Poland.
