= Płonka, Lublin Voivodeship =

Płonka
- Village
- Location within Poland
- Coordinates: 50°50′N 22°59′E
- Country: Poland
- Voivodeship: Lublin
- County: Krasnystaw
- Gmina: Rudnik
- Population: 350

Płonka [ˈpwɔŋka] is a village in the administrative district of Gmina Rudnik, within Krasnystaw County, Lublin Voivodeship, in eastern Poland.
