= Mościska-Kolonia =

- Village
- Location within Poland
- Coordinates: 50°51′47″N 22°56′38″E
- Country: Poland
- Voivodeship: Lublin
- County: Krasnystaw
- Gmina: Rudnik

Mościska-Kolonia [mɔɕˈt͡ɕiska kɔˈlɔɲa] is a village in the administrative district of Gmina Rudnik, within Krasnystaw County, Lublin Voivodeship, in eastern Poland.
