= Gmina Fajsławice =

Gmina Fajsławice Fajsławice Commune
- Gmina
- Coat of arms
- Interactive map of Gmina Fajsławice
- Coordinates (Fajsławice): 51°6′N 22°57′E
- Country: Poland
- Voivodeship: Lublin
- County: Krasnystaw
- Seat: Fajsławice

Area
  - Total: 70.69 km^{2} (27.29 sq mi)

Population (2006)
  - Total: 5,062
  - Density: 71.61/km^{2} (185.5/sq mi)

Gmina Fajsławice is a rural gmina (administrative district) in Krasnystaw County, Lublin Voivodeship, in eastern Poland. Its seat is the village of Fajsławice, which lies approximately 19 kilometres (12 mi) north-west of Krasnystaw and 32 km (20 mi) south-east of the regional capital Lublin.

The gmina covers an area of 70.69 square kilometres (27.3 sq mi), and as of 2006 its total population is 5,062.

== Villages ==
Gmina Fajsławice contains the villages and settlements of Bielecha, Boniewo, Dziecinin, Fajsławice, Ignasin, Kosnowiec, Ksawerówka, Marysin, Siedliska, Suchodoły, Wola Idzikowska and Zosin.

== Neighbouring gminas ==
Gmina Fajsławice is bordered by the gminas of Łopiennik Górny, Piaski, Rybczewice and Trawniki.
