= Gmina Łopiennik Górny =

Gmina Łopiennik Górny Łopiennik Górny Commune
- Gmina
- Coat of arms
- Interactive map of Gmina Łopiennik Górny
- Coordinates (Łopiennik Górny): 51°3′N 23°2′E
- Country: Poland
- Voivodeship: Lublin
- County: Krasnystaw
- Seat: Łopiennik Górny

Area
  - Total: 106.25 km^{2} (41.02 sq mi)

Population (2006)
  - Total: 4,301
  - Density: 40.48/km^{2} (104.8/sq mi)
- Website: http://www.lopiennik.pl/

Gmina Łopiennik Górny is a rural gmina (administrative district) in Krasnystaw County, Lublin Voivodeship, in eastern Poland. Its seat is the village of Łopiennik Górny, which lies approximately 11 kilometres (7 mi) north-west of Krasnystaw and 40 km (25 mi) south-east of the regional capital Lublin.

The gmina covers an area of 106.25 square kilometres (41.0 sq mi), and as of 2006 its total population is 4,390.

== Villages ==
Gmina Łopiennik Górny contains the villages and settlements of Borowica, Dobryniów, Dobryniów-Kolonia, Gliniska, Krzywe, Łopiennik Dolny, Łopiennik Dolny-Kolonia, Łopiennik Górny, Łopiennik Nadrzeczny, Łopiennik Podleśny, Majdan Krzywski, Nowiny, Olszanka, Wola Żulińska and Żulin.

== Neighbouring gminas ==
Gmina Łopiennik Górny is bordered by the gminas of Fajsławice, Gorzków, Krasnystaw, Rejowiec, Rejowiec Fabryczny, Rybczewice and Trawniki.
