= Adamówka, Lublin Voivodeship =

Adamówka
- Village
- Location within Poland
- Coordinates: 50°56′05″N 22°48′15″E
- Country: Poland
- Voivodeship: Lublin
- County: Krasnystaw
- Gmina: Żółkiewka

Adamówka [adaˈmufka] is a village in the administrative district of Gmina Żółkiewka, in Krasnystaw County, Lublin Voivodeship, in eastern Poland.
