= Siedliszczki, Chełm County =

Siedliszczki
- Village
- Location within Poland
- Coordinates: 51°5′52″N 23°14′19″E
- Country: Poland
- Voivodeship: Lublin
- County: Chełm
- Gmina: Rejowiec

Siedliszczki [ɕɛdˈliʂt͡ʂki] is a village in the administrative district of Gmina Rejowiec, within Chełm County, Lublin Voivodeship, in eastern Poland.
