= Niedziałowice Pierwsze =

- Village
- Location within Poland
- Coordinates: 51°03′22″N 23°20′42″E
- Country: Poland
- Voivodeship: Lublin
- County: Chełm
- Gmina: Rejowiec

Niedziałowice Pierwsze [ɲɛd͡ʑawɔˈvit͡sɛ ˈpjɛrfʂɛ] is a village in the administrative district of Gmina Rejowiec, within Chełm County, Lublin Voivodeship, in eastern Poland.
