= Wólka Rejowiecka =

- Village
- Location within Poland
- Coordinates: 51°5′58″N 23°16′34″E
- Country: Poland
- Voivodeship: Lublin
- County: Chełm
- Gmina: Rejowiec

Wólka Rejowiecka (Polish pronunciation: [ˈvulka rɛjɔˈvjɛt͡ska]) is a village in the administrative district of Gmina Rejowiec, within Chełm County, Lublin Voivodeship, in eastern Poland.
