= Aleksandria Krzywowolska =

- Village
- Location within Poland
- Coordinates: 51°9′N 23°16′E
- Country: Poland
- Voivodeship: Lublin
- County: Chełm
- Gmina: Rejowiec

Population
  - Total: 140

Aleksandria Krzywowolska [alɛkˈsandrja kʂɨvɔˈvɔlska] is a village in the administrative district of Gmina Rejowiec, within Chełm County, Lublin Voivodeship, in eastern Poland.
