= Łopiennik Górny =

- Village
- Location within Poland
- Coordinates: 51°3′N 23°2′E
- Country: Poland
- Voivodeship: Lublin
- County: Krasnystaw
- Gmina: Łopiennik Górny
- Population: 563

Łopiennik Górny [wɔˈpjɛnnik ˈɡurnɨ] is a village in Krasnystaw County, Lublin Voivodeship, in eastern Poland. It is the seat of the gmina (administrative district) called Gmina Łopiennik Górny.
