= Rudnik, Gmina Rudnik =

Rudnik
- Village
- Location within Poland
- Coordinates: 50°52′50″N 22°58′18″E
- Country: Poland
- Voivodeship: Lublin
- County: Krasnystaw
- Gmina: Rudnik
- Population: 543

Rudnik (Polish pronunciation: [ˈrudɲik]) is a village in Krasnystaw County, Lublin Voivodeship, in eastern Poland. It is the seat of the gmina (administrative district) called Gmina Rudnik.
