= Niedziałowice Drugie =

- Village
- Location within Poland
- Coordinates: 51°4′2″N 23°19′36″E
- Country: Poland
- Voivodeship: Lublin
- County: Chełm
- Gmina: Rejowiec

Population
  - Total: 129

Niedziałowice Drugie [ɲɛd͡ʑawɔˈvit͡sɛ ˈdruɡʲɛ] is a village in the administrative district of Gmina Rejowiec, within Chełm County, Lublin Voivodeship, in eastern Poland.
