= Bieniów, Lublin Voivodeship =

Bieniów
- Village
- Location within Poland
- Coordinates: 51°9′0″N 23°19′7″E
- Country: Poland
- Voivodeship: Lublin
- County: Chełm
- Gmina: Rejowiec

Bieniów [ˈbjɛɲuf] is a village in the administrative district of Gmina Rejowiec, within Chełm County, Lublin Voivodeship, in eastern Poland.
