= Stary Majdan, Gmina Rejowiec =

Stary Majdan
- Village
- Location within Poland
- Coordinates: 51°8′4″N 23°18′41″E
- Country: Poland
- Voivodeship: Lublin
- County: Chełm
- Gmina: Rejowiec

Population (approx.)
  - Total: 80

Stary Majdan (Polish pronunciation: [ˈstarɨ ˈmajdan]) is a village in the administrative district of Gmina Rejowiec, within Chełm County, Lublin Voivodeship, in eastern Poland.
