= Battle of Żyrzyn =

Coordinates: 51°30′00″N 22°06′00″E

- Part of the January Uprising
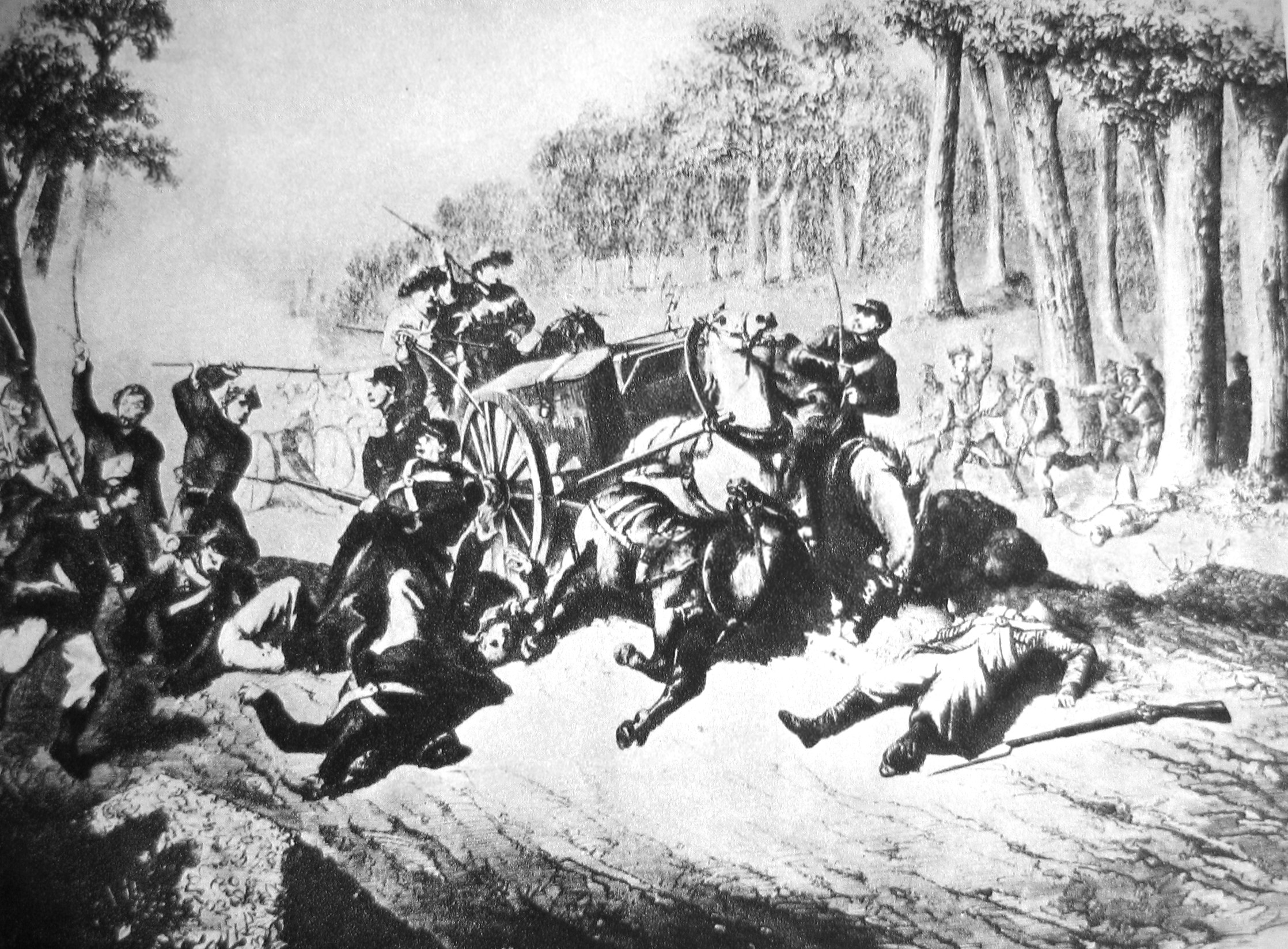
- Battle of Żyrzyn 1863
| Date | 8 August 1863 |
| Location | Żyrzyn, Congress Poland, nowadays Puławy County, Poland |
| Result | Polish victory |

Belligerents
| (Poland); Polish Insurgents | Russian Empire |

Commanders and leaders
| Colonel Michal Heidenreich; O'Brien de Lacey | lieutenant Laudański |

Strength
| 700 | 500; 2 cannons |

Casualties and losses
| 10–40 killed | 80–181 killed 282 captured |

The Battle of Żyrzyn took place on August 8, 1863, in or near the village of Żyrzyn, Puławy County, Poland, between a small detachment of Russian troops and a force of Polish troops under the command of Colonel Michal Heidenreich.

The Russian force of 500 soldiers and two cannon were escorting a load of 200,000 rubles for the Russian army. Out of these,140,000 were captured by the Polish forces, along with 282 prisoners of war. Of the remaining Russian troops, 181 were killed and 87 men escaped along with the remaining 60,000 rubles. The embarrassing defeat was widely reported on by the European press, and throughout the January Uprisings the Polish insurgents counted the engagement, one of many similar small battles, as a "great victory".
