= Krasnystaw County =

Krasnystaw County Powiat krasnostawski
- County
- Flag Coat of arms

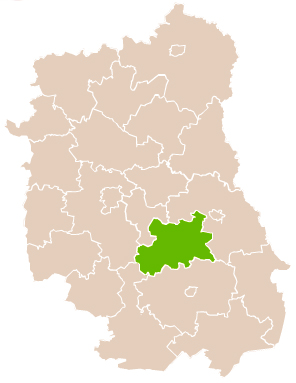
- Location within the voivodeship
- Coordinates (Krasnystaw): 51°0′N 23°10′E
- Country: Poland
- Voivodeship: Lublin
- Seat: Krasnystaw
- Gminas: Total 10 (incl. 1 urban): Krasnystaw; Gmina Fajsławice; Gmina Gorzków; Gmina Izbica; Gmina Kraśniczyn; Gmina Krasnystaw; Gmina Łopiennik Górny; Gmina Rudnik; Gmina Siennica Różana; Gmina Żółkiewka

Area
  - Total: 1,067.18 km^{2} (412.04 sq mi)

Population (2019)
  - Total: 63,554
  - Density: 59.553/km^{2} (154.24/sq mi)
  - Urban: 18,675
  - Rural: 44,879
- Car plates: LKS
- Website: www.krasnystaw-powiat.pl

Krasnystaw County (Polish: powiat krasnostawski) is a unit of territorial administration and local government (powiat) in Lublin Voivodeship, eastern Poland. It was established on January 1, 1999, as a result of the Polish local government reforms passed in 1998. Its administrative seat and only town is Krasnystaw, which lies 50 kilometres (31 mi) south-east of the regional capital Lublin.

The county covers an area of 1,067.18 square kilometres (412.0 sq mi). As of 2019, its total population is 63,554, out of which the population of Krasnystaw is 18,675 and the rural population is 44,879.

== Neighbouring counties ==
Krasnystaw County is bordered by Chełm County to the north-east, Zamość County and Biłgoraj County to the south, Lublin County to the west, and Świdnik County to the north-west.

== Administrative divisions ==
The county is subdivided into 10 gminas (one urban and nine rural). These are listed in the following table, in descending order of population. (Until 2006 the county also included Gmina Rejowiec, which is now in Chełm County.)

Gmina	Type	Area (km^{2})	Population (2019)	Seat
Krasnystaw	urban	23.1	18,675	
Gmina Krasnystaw	rural	151.0	8,590	Krasnystaw (Note: seat not part of the gmina)
Gmina Izbica	rural	138.7	8,169	Izbica
Gmina Żółkiewka	rural	130.0	5,383	Żółkiewka
Gmina Fajsławice	rural	70.7	4,564	Fajsławice
Gmina Siennica Różana	rural	98.4	4,136	Siennica Różana
Gmina Łopiennik Górny	rural	106.3	3,915	Łopiennik Górny
Gmina Kraśniczyn	rural	110.0	3,653	Kraśniczyn
Gmina Gorzków	rural	96.2	3,466	Gorzków
Gmina Rudnik	rural	88.4	3,003	Rudnik
