= List of massacres in Poland =

The following is a list of massacres that have occurred in both historic and modern day areas of Poland (numbers may be approximate):

== Massacres until 1939 ==
Name	Date	Location	Perpetrators	Deaths	Notes
Sack of Sandomierz (1241)	13 February 1241	Sandomierz	Mongol Empire		The Mongols massacred almost all residents.
Sack of Kraków (1241)	March 1241	Kraków	Mongol Empire		The Mongols massacred almost all residents.
Sack of Sandomierz (1260)	February 1260	Sandomierz	Mongol Empire		The Mongols massacred almost all residents.
Gdańsk massacre	13 November 1308	Gdańsk	Teutonic Knights	60–1,000 Polish civilians	
Gołańcz massacre	3 May 1656	Gołańcz	(yes) Swedish Empire	25+ Poles	Remains of 22 adults (incl. six women) and three children were discovered during an archaeological survey in 2014.
Kościan massacre of 1656	10 October 1656	Kościan	(yes) Swedish Empire	300 Polish inhabitants	
Massacre of Maków Mazowiecki	c. 1656	Maków Mazowiecki	Irregular Polish troops of Stefan Czarniecki	Most of the local Jewish population.	
Massacre of Ciechanów	c. 1656	Ciechanów	Irregular Polish troops of Stefan Czarniecki	About 50 Jewish families	
Massacre of Chmielnik	c. 1656	Chmielnik	Irregular Polish troops of Stefan Czarniecki	150 Jews	
Massacre of Uman	20–21 June 1768	Humań	Haydamaks	up to 20,000 Poles, Jews and Uniate Ukrainians	
Massacre of Praga	4 November 1794	Praga, Warsaw	Russian Empire	6,000 Polish people killed or wounded	
Fiszewo massacre	27 January 1832	Fiszewo	Kingdom of Prussia	12 Poles	
Galician slaughter	early 1846	Western Galicia	Polish peasants	about 1,000 nobles	
Warsaw massacres of 1861	25–27 February and 8 April 1861	Warsaw	Russian Empire	Over 200 Polish protesters	
Białaszewo massacre	31 March 1863	Białaszewo	Russian Empire	16+ Polish civilians	including women
Bredynki massacre	6 May 1863	Bredynki	Kingdom of Prussia	17 Poles	further 30 people wounded
Lututów massacre	15 June 1863	Lututów	Russian Empire	Dozens of Polish POWs	
Wygoda massacre	21 July 1863	Wygoda	Russian Empire	50 young Poles	
Białystok pogrom	14–16 June 1906	Białystok	Black Hundreds; Russian soldiers	81–88 Jews	
Siedlce pogrom	8–10 September 1906	Siedlce	Russian Empire	26 Jews	
Lwów pogrom of 1914	27 September 1914	Lwów	Russian Empire	38–49 Jews	
Międzyrzec Podlaski massacre of 1918	16 November 1918	Międzyrzec Podlaski	Weimar Republic	44 Poles	
Lwów pogrom of 1918	21–23 November 1918	Lwów	Poland	52–150 Jewish victims, up to 340 total. Over 443 injured.	
Pinsk massacre	5 april 1919	Pinsk	Poland	35 Jews	
Mysłowice massacre	15 August 1919	Mysłowice	Weimar Republic	10 Poles	Seven miners, two women and a 13-year-old boy
Wilno school massacre	6 May 1925	Wilno (now Vilnius)	2 students	5 (including themselves)	First school shooting in Polish history

== Massacres during World War II and communist rule ==
Name	Date	Location	Perpetrators	Deaths	Notes
Intelligenzaktion	September 1939-Spring 1942	Poland	Nazi Germany	up to 100,000 Polish people, mostly intellectuals	Largest massacres committed at Piaśnica, Mniszek, Szpęgawsk Forest, Gniewkowo, Łopatki, Dopiewiec, Igły, Klamry, Fordon, Palmiry.
Torzeniec massacre	1–2 September 1939	Torzeniec	Nazi Germany	37 Poles	
Zimnowoda and Parzymiechy massacre	2 September 1939	Zimnowoda and Parzymiechy	Nazi Germany	113 Poles	including 30 children
Wyszanów massacre	2 September 1939	Wyszanów	Nazi Germany	24 Poles	
Gostyń massacre	2 September 1939	Gostyń	Nazi Germany	13 Poles	including four women and a parish priest
Bukownica massacre	2 September 1939	Bukownica	Nazi Germany	7+ Poles	
Łaziska massacre	2–6 September 1939	Łaziska Górne, Łaziska Dolne and Łaziska Średnie	Nazi Germany	69 Poles	including 30 children
Albertów massacre	3 September 1939	Albertów	Nazi Germany	159 Poles	
Krzepice massacre	3 September 1939	Krzepice	Nazi Germany	30 Poles	
Mysłów massacre	3 September 1939	Mysłów	Nazi Germany	22 Poles	Victims were burned alive, including 10 children.
Pińczyce massacre	3 September 1939	Pińczyce	Nazi Germany	20 Poles	
Świekatowo massacre	3 September 1939	Świekatowo	Nazi Germany	26 Poles	
Święta Anna massacre	3 September 1939	Święta Anna	Nazi Germany	29 Poles	
Jankowice massacre	3 September 1939	Jankowice	Nazi Germany	13 Poles	including women and children
Zgoń massacre	3 September 1939	Zgoń	Nazi Germany	8 Poles	including one woman
Lędziny massacre	3 September 1939	Lędziny	Nazi Germany	7 Poles	including a 16-year-old girl
Bloody Sunday	3–4 September 1939	Bydgoszcz	Nazi Germany	254	
Świętochłowice massacre	3–4 September 1939	Świętochłowice	Nazi Germany	10 Poles	
Częstochowa massacre (Bloody Monday)	4 September 1939	Częstochowa	Nazi Germany	88–200	
Złoczew massacre	4 September 1939	Złoczew	Nazi Germany	200 Poles and Jews	
Katowice massacre (Bloody Monday)	4 September 1939	Katowice	Nazi Germany	about 80 Polish defenders	including Polish boy and girl scouts
Kruszyna massacre	4 September 1939	Kruszyna	Nazi Germany	dozens of Poles	including 10 children
Cielętniki massacre	4 September 1939	Cielętniki	Nazi Germany	28 Poles	including four children
Pasternik massacre	4 September 1939	Pasternik	Nazi Germany	29 Poles	including one woman
Wodzisław massacre of 1939	4 September 1939	Wodzisław	Nazi Germany	around 40 Poles	
Pławno massacre	4 September 1939	Pławno	Nazi Germany	15 Poles	
Pszczyna massacre	4 September 1939	Pszczyna	Nazi Germany	14 Poles	13 boy scouts and a teacher
Siewierz massacre	4 September 1939	Siewierz	Nazi Germany	10 Poles	including several teenagers
Wyry massacre	4–6 September 1939	Wyry	Nazi Germany	over 10 Poles	
Serock massacre	5 September 1939	Serock	Nazi Germany	over 80 Polish POWs	
Kajetanowice massacre	5 September 1939	Kajetanowice	Nazi Germany	over 70 Poles	including ten children under the age of 16
Krasnosielc massacre	5–6 September 1939	Krasnosielc	Nazi Germany	50 Jews	
Moryca and Longinówka massacre	6 September 1939	Moryca and Longinówka	Nazi Germany	Polish POWs, including 19 officers	
Komorów and Krasna massacre	6 September 1939	Komorów and Krasna	Nazi Germany	28	including children
Uniejów massacre	6, 8 September 1939	Uniejów	Nazi Germany	50	
Będzin massacres	6, 9 September 1939	Będzin	Nazi Germany	20 Poles and 100 Jews	
Wylazłów massacre	7 September 1939	Wylazłów	Nazi Germany	24 Poles	
Mordarka massacre	7 September 1939	Mordarka	Nazi Germany	9 Jews and one Pole	
Wągrowiec massacre	7 September 1939	Wągrowiec	Nazi Germany	8 Poles	
Balin massacre	8 September 1939	Balin	Nazi Germany	21 Poles	
Koźle massacre	8 September 1939	Koźle	Nazi Germany	17 Poles	
Ciepielów massacre	8 September 1939	Ciepielów	Nazi Germany	around 300 Polish POWs	
Tyszki massacre	8 September 1939	Tyszki-Ciągaczki	Nazi Germany	33 Poles	
Chechło massacre	8 September 1939	Chechło near Pabianice	Nazi Germany	30 Poles	
Dominikowice massacre	8 September 1939	Dominikowice	Nazi Germany	23 Poles	
Czekaj massacre	8 September 1939	Czekaj	Nazi Germany	13 Poles	
Bagatele massacre	8 September 1939	Bagatele	Nazi Germany	11 Poles	
Siemianowice Śląskie massacre	8 September 1939	Siemianowice Śląskie	Nazi Germany	6 Poles	
Lipsko massacre	8–9 September 1939	Lipsko	Nazi Germany	66	
Mszczonów massacres	8, 11 September 1939	Mszczonów	Nazi Germany	11 Polish POWs and 20 Polish civilians	Including the town's mayor.
Sławków massacre	9 September 1939	Sławków	Nazi Germany	98 Jews	
Wyszków massacre	9 September 1939	Wyszków	Nazi Germany	65+ Jews	
Orło massacre	9 September 1939	Orło	Nazi Germany	10 Poles	
Pniewo massacre	9 September 1939	Pniewo	Nazi Germany	Over 10 Poles	
Mielno massacre	9 September 1939	Mielno	Nazi Germany	7 Poles	
Łęczyca massacre	9–10 September 1939	Łęczyca	Nazi Germany	29 Poles	
Mszadla massacre	10 September 1939	Mszadla	Nazi Germany	153 Poles	
Gniazdowo massacre	10 September 1939	Gniazdowo	Nazi Germany	around 20 Poles	
Zdziechowa massacre	10 September 1939	Zdziechowa	Nazi Germany	24 Poles	
Rawa Mazowiecka massacre	10 September 1939	Rawa Mazowiecka	Nazi Germany	40	
Bądków massacre	10 September 1939	Bądków	Nazi Germany	22 Poles	including a 14-year-old boy
Piaseczno massacre of 1939	10 September 1939	Piaseczno	Nazi Germany	21 Polish POWs	
Stare Rogowo massacre	10 September 1939	Stare Rogowo	Nazi Germany	21 Poles	
Laski Szlacheckie massacre	10 September 1939	Laski Szlacheckie	Nazi Germany	20 Poles	including four families
Karczew massacre	11 September 1939	Karczew	Nazi Germany	75 Poles	
Skierniewice massacre	11 September 1939	Skierniewice	Nazi Germany	60	
Kowalewice massacre	11 September 1939	Kowalewice	Nazi Germany	23 Poles	
Obora massacre	11 September 1939	Obora	Nazi Germany	22 Poles	
Niewolno massacre	11 September 1939	Niewolno	Nazi Germany	18 Poles	
Jankowo Dolne massacre	11 September 1939	Jankowo Dolne	Nazi Germany	12 Poles	including women and children
Parzniew massacre	12 September 1939	Parzniew	Nazi Germany	around 100 Polish POWs	
Szczucin massacre	12 September 1939	Szczucin	Nazi Germany	around 40 Polish POWs and around 30 Polish civilians	
Parma massacre	12 September 1939	Parma	Nazi Germany	32 Poles	
Koźmice Wielkie massacre	12 September 1939	Koźmice Wielkie	Nazi Germany	32 Jews	
Sadówka massacre	12 September 1939	Sadówka	Nazi Germany	around 12 Poles	
Cecylówka massacre	13 September 1939	Cecylówka	Nazi Germany	54–68	
Łowicz massacre	13 September 1939	Łowicz	Nazi Germany	21	
Mień massacre	13 September 1939	Mień	Nazi Germany	9 Poles	
Zambrów massacre	night of 13–14 September 1939	Zambrów	Nazi Germany	more than 200 Polish POW	
Olszewo massacre	14 September 1939	Olszewo	Nazi Germany	30 Polish POWs and 23 civilians	
Moskwin massacre	14 September 1939	Moskwin	Nazi Germany	9 Poles	
Sulejówek massacre	15 September 1939	Sulejówek and Długa Szlachecka	Nazi Germany	over 90 Poles	
Massacre in Dynów	15-28 September 1939	Dynów	Nazi Germany	Around 300 killed	
Retki massacre	16 September 1939	Retki	Nazi Germany	22 Poles	
Henryków massacre	17 September 1939	Henryków	Nazi Germany	76 Poles	including women and children
Leszno massacre	17 September 1939	Leszno	Nazi Germany	around 50 Poles	
Bąków massacre	17 September 1939	Bąków	Nazi Germany	18 Poles	including two families
Śladów massacre	18 September 1939	Śladów	Nazi Germany	around 300 Poles, including POWs and refugees	including women and children
Mogilno massacre	18 September 1939	Mogilno	Local German minority	40 Polish (1 Jewish descent)	
Błonie massacre	18 September 1939	Błonie	Nazi Germany	50 Jews and Poles	
Gąbin massacre	19–21 September 1939	Gąbin	Nazi Germany	20 Poles	
Majdan Wielki massacre	20 September 1939	Majdan Wielki	Nazi Germany	42 Polish POWs	
Białystok massacre of 1939	20 September 1939	Białystok	Nazi Germany	8	
Boryszew massacre	22 September 1939	Boryszew	Nazi Germany	50 Polish POWs	
Urycz massacre	22 September 1939	Urycz	Nazi Germany	73–100 Polish POWs	
Psia Górka massacre	22 September 1939	Psia Górka	Soviet Union	over 100 Polish POWs and 300 Polish civilians	
Husynne massacre	23 September 1939	Husynne	Soviet Union	25 Polish POWs	
Rogalin massacre	24 September 1939	Rogalin	Soviet Union	28 Polish POWs	
Mokrany massacre	28 September 1939	Mokrany	Soviet Union	18 Polish POWs	
Zakroczym massacre	28 September 1939	Zakroczym	Nazi Germany	about 600 Polish POWs	
Luszkówko massacre	September 1939–January 1940	Luszkówko	Nazi Germany	around 1,000 Poles	The victims were mentally ill people from a psychiatric hospital in Świecie.
Szczuczki massacre	1 October 1939	Szczuczki	Nazi Germany	64 Poles	including ten boys under the age of 18
Valley of Death (Bydgoszcz)	October–November 1939	Bydgoszcz	Nazi Germany	1,200–1,400	
Dalki massacre	7 November 1939	Dalki	Nazi Germany	24 Poles	including 10 defenders of Kłecko
Ostrów Mazowiecka massacre	11 November 1939	Ostrów Mazowiecka	Nazi Germany	up to 600 Jews	
Wawer massacre	26–27 December 1939	Wawer	Nazi Germany	107	7 shot but survived
Palmiry massacre	December 1939–June 1941	Palmiry	Nazi Germany	1,700 Poles and Jews	
Sieklówka massacre	December 1939–January 1940	Sieklówka	Nazi Germany	93 Poles	
Piotrowice massacre	18 January 1940	Piotrowice	Nazi Germany	39 Poles	
Dąbrówka Mała massacre	3–4 April 1940	Dąbrówka Mała	Nazi Germany	40 Poles	
Parczew massacre	20 February 1940	Parczew	Nazi Germany	350 Polish POWs (Jews)	
Celiny massacre	4 April 1940	Celiny	Nazi Germany	29 Poles	
Skłoby massacre	11 April 1940	Skłoby	Nazi Germany	265 Poles	including women and children
Bloody Wednesday of Olkusz	31 July 1940	Olkusz	Nazi Germany	20 Polish civilians	
NKVD prisoner massacres in Poland	June–November 1941	Eastern Poland	Soviet Union	20,000–30,000	Largest massacres committed at Lwów, Łuck, Stanisławów, Dobromil, Tarnopol, Wilno, Złoczów, Sambor, Dubno, Drohobycz, Zaleszczyki.
Wolica massacre	7 July 1941	Wolica	Nazi Germany	22 Poles	
Łaszczów massacre of 1941	21 June 1941	Łaszczów	Ukrainian nationalists	30 Poles	
Zabłudów massacre	23 June 1941	Zabłudów	Soviet Union	15 Poles	
Nowosiółki massacre	1941	Nowosiółki	Nazi Germany	Several hundred	The victims were patients of a local psychiatric hospital.
Szczuczyn pogrom	25–28 June 1941	Szczuczyn	Polish nationalists	300 Jews	Pogrom halted after intervention by German army in favor of the Jews. Additional 100 Jews killed in July by Poles. The Jews were subsequently murdered by the Germans.
1941 Białystok massacres	27 June, 3–4 July, 12–13 July 1941	Białystok	Nazi Germany	6,500–7,000 Jews	
Dobromil massacre	30 June 1941	Dobromil	Nazi Germany	50–132 Jews	Not to be confused with the NKVD prisoner massacre in Dobromil, committed earlier that month.
Lwów pogroms of 1941	June–July 1941	Lwów	Ukrainian nationalists Nazi Germany local crowds	6,000 Jews	
Broniki massacre	1 July 1941	Broniki	Soviet Union	153 German POWs	
Ponary massacre	July 1941–August 1944	Ponary	Nazi Germany; Ypatingasis būrys	100,000 Jews, Poles and Russians	
Massacre of Lwów professors	3–4 July 1941	Lwów	Nazi Germany	45 Polish professors	
Radziłów pogrom	7–9 July 1941	Radziłów	Poles	600–2,000 Jews	
Jedwabne pogrom	10 July 1941	Jedwabne	Poles (German military police was present, but did not intervene)	340–1,600 Jews	
Mołodeczno massacres	13, 18 July, 25 October 1941, June, 7 September 1942	Mołodeczno	Nazi Germany	around 730 Jews	
Krewo massacre	25 July 1941	Krewo	Nazi Germany	8	
Oszmiana massacre of 1941	26 July 1941	Oszmiana	Nazi Germany	527 Jews	
Beresteczko massacre of 1941	8 August 1941	Beresteczko	Nazi Germany	around 300 Jews	
Czarny Las massacre	14–15 August 1941	Czarny Las near Stanisławów	Nazi Germany	250–300 Poles	
Mass murders in Tykocin	25 August 1941	Tykocin	Nazi Germany	some 700 Jews	Some 150 Jews managed to escape the massacre, however most were handed over to the Germans.
Tonkiele massacre	September–December 1941	Tonkiele	Nazi Germany	5,000+ POWs	
Worniki massacre	30 September 1941	Worniki	Nazi Germany; Ypatingasis būrys	1,446 Jews	
Misznowszyna Forest massacre	20–21 October 1941	Misznowszyna Forest near Horodyszcze	Nazi Germany	1,000+ Jews	
Kleck massacres of 1941	25 and 30 October 1941	Kleck	Nazi Germany	around 3,800 Jews	
Nieśwież massacre	30 October 1941	Nieśwież	Nazi Germany	around 4,000 Jews	
Uściług massacre of 1941	October 1941	Uściług	Nazi Germany	around 890 Jews	
Rudzica Forest massacre	autumn of 1941	Rudzica Forest	Nazi Germany	some 1,500 Jews	
Siniawka massacre	autumn of 1941 and summer of 1942	Siniawka	Nazi Germany	around 730 Jews	
Ilja massacres	17 March and 7 June 1942	Ilja	Nazi Germany	650–850 Jews	
Kazanów massacre	18 March 1942	Kazanów	Nazi Germany	16 Poles and 16 Jews	
Rohatyn massacre	20 March 1942	Rohatyn	Nazi Germany	1,820 Jews	
Wąwolnica massacre	22 March 1942	Wąwolnica	Nazi Germany	40–120 Jews	
Petryków massacre	23 March 1942	Petryków	Nazi Germany	around 700 Jews	
Dołhinów massacre	30 March 1942	Dołhinów	Nazi Germany	around 1,000 Jews	
Opoczno massacre	27 April 1942	Opoczno	Nazi Germany	30–40 Jews	The victims were Zionists and Communists.
Zdzięcioł massacres	30 April and 10 August 1942	Zdzięcioł	Nazi Germany	3,000–5,000 Jews	
Wiszenki massacre	10–25 May 1942	Wiszenki and Wiszenki-Kolonia	14th Waffen Grenadier Division of the SS	around 42 Poles	including women and children
Święciany massacre	19–20 May 1942	Švenčionys, modern-day Lithuania (then eastern Poland)	Lithuanian Security Police	400–1,200 Poles	
Horyszów Polski massacre	19 May 1942	Horyszów Polski	Nazi Germany; Ukrainian Auxiliary Police	17 Poles	
Łużki massacre	1 June 1942	Łużki	Nazi Germany	528 Jews	
Iwieniec massacre	9 June 1942	Iwieniec	Nazi Germany	around 800 Jews	
Wodzisław massacre of 1942	ca. 15 June 1942	Wodzisław	Nazi Germany	50 Jews	
Druja massacre	17 June 1942	Druja	Nazi Germany	1,000+ Jews	
Marków massacre	24 June 1942	Marków	Nazi Germany	500+ Jews	
Łabuńki massacre	25 June 1942	Łabuńki	Nazi Germany	9 Poles	
Tuchorza massacre	9 July 1942	Tuchorza	Nazi Germany	15 Poles	
Horodziej massacre	16 July 1942	Horodziej	Nazi Germany	around 1,000 Jews	
Rajsk massacre	16 July 1942	Rajsk	Nazi Germany	142	
Kleck massacre of 1942	22 July 1942	Kleck	Nazi Germany	around 1,400 Jews	
Mereczowszczyzna massacre	24–25 July 1942	Mereczowszczyzna	Nazi Germany	around 1,200 Jews	
Wiśniowiec massacre	11–12 August 1942	Wiśniowiec	Nazi Germany	2,669 Jews	
Szumsk massacre	13 August 1942	Szumsk	Nazi Germany	1,792 Jews	
Lenin massacre	14 August 1942	Lenin	Nazi Germany		Nearly all Jewish residents were massacred.
Ostrówek massacres	19 August 1942 and 9 April 1944	Ostrówek	Nazi Germany	31 Poles	including men, women and children
Rożyszcze massacre	22 August 1942	Rożyszcze	Nazi Germany	over 3,000 Jews	
Torczyn massacre	23 August 1942	Torczyn	Nazi Germany	nearly 2,000 Jews	
Turzysk massacre	23 August 1942	Turzysk	Nazi Germany	1,100–1,512 Jews	
Rokitno massacre	25 August 1942	Rokitno	Nazi Germany	around 300 Jews	
Sarny massacre	27–28 August 1942	Sarny	Nazi Germany	14,000–18,000 Jews and around 100 Romanis	
Beresteczko massacre of 1942	September 1942	Beresteczko	Nazi Germany	around 2,000 Jews	
Uściług massacre of 1942	September 1942	Uściług	Nazi Germany	1,847 Jews	
Stolin massacre	11 September 1942	Stolin	Nazi Germany		The victims were Jews.
Krasienin massacre	12 September 1942	Krasienin	Nazi Germany	5 Poles	
Sienkiewiczówka massacre	October 1942	Sienkiewiczówka	Nazi Germany	Several hundred Jews	
Nowy Bidaczów massacre	6 October 1942	Nowy Bidaczów	Nazi Germany	22 Poles	retribution for rescuing Jews from the Holocaust
Oszmiana massacre of 1942	23 October 1942	Oszmiana	Nazi Germany	406 Jews	Victims were elderly people.
Izabelin massacre	24 October 1942	Izabelin	Nazi Germany	dozens of Jews	The victims were prisoners of a forced labour camp.
Obrocz massacre	28 October 1942	Obrocz	Nazi Germany; Ukrainian Auxiliary Police	28 Poles	
Kurów massacre of 1942	13 November 1942	Kurów	Nazi Germany	36 Jews	
Parchatka massacre	18 November 1942	Parchatka	14th Waffen Grenadier Division of the SS; Ukrainian Auxiliary Police	28 Poles	further 25 Poles deported to Auschwitz
Duniłowicze massacre	21–22 November 1942	Duniłowicze	Nazi Germany	around 900 Jews	
Jarosławiec massacre	December 1942	Jarosławiec	Nazi Germany	12 Poles	3 men, 2 women, and 7 children
Wielącza massacre	5 and 15 December 1942	Wielącza	Nazi Germany; Ukrainian Auxiliary Police	around 172 Poles	including 27 children; massacre committed during an expulsion
Stary Ciepielów and Rekówka massacre	6 December 1942	Stary Ciepielów and Rekówka	Nazi Germany	31 Poles (including children) and 2 Jews	including women and children; retribution for rescuing Jews from the Holocaust
Świesielice massacre	7–8 December 1942	Świesielice	Nazi Germany	15 Poles	
Kitów massacre	11 December 1942	Kitów	Nazi Germany	164+ Poles	
Puszno Skokowskie massacre	15 December 1942	Puszno Skokowskie	Nazi Germany	5 Poles	including women
Rachodoszcze massacres	20 and 29 December 1942, 22 March 1943	Rachodoszcze	Nazi Germany	46 Poles	including women and children
Łaszczów massacre of 1942	25 December 1942	Łaszczów	Nazi Germany	76 Poles	
Samoklęski massacre	January 1943	Samoklęski	Nazi Germany	27 Jews and one Pole	retribution for rescuing Jews from the Holocaust
Wierzbie massacre	4 January 1943	Wierzbie	Nazi Germany; Ukrainian nationalists	30 Poles	21 men, 3 women and 6 children
Wólka Nieliska massacre of 1943	4 January 1943	Wólka Nieliska	Nazi Germany	13 Poles	10 men and 3 women
Stary Lubotyń massacre	23 January 1943	Stary Lubotyń	Nazi Germany	8 Poles	
Dzierążnia massacre	28–29 January 1943	Dzierążnia	Nazi Germany	over 60 Poles	
Budy and Huta Dzierążyńska massacre	29 January 1943	Budy Dzierążyńskie and Huta Dzierążyńska	Nazi Germany	50–80 Poles	
Sumin massacre	29 January 1943	Sumin	Nazi Germany	50	
Róża massacre	2 February 1943	Róża	Nazi Germany	dozens	
Imbramowice massacre	2 February 1943	Imbramowice	Nazi Germany	50–60 Romanis	
Paulinów massacre	24 February 1943	Paulinów	Nazi Germany	11 Poles and 3 Jews	retribution for rescuing Jews from the Holocaust
Leśna massacre	13 March 1943	Leśna	Nazi Germany	around 70 Jews	
Siedliska massacre	15 March 1943	Siedliska	Nazi Germany	5 Poles and 4 Jews	retribution for rescuing Jews from the Holocaust
Różaniec massacre	18 March 1943	Różaniec	Nazi Germany	around 70 Poles	
Purim massacre in Tomaszów Mazowiecki	21 March 1943	Tomaszów Mazowiecki	Nazi Germany	20+ Jews	Massacre committed during the Purim Jewish holiday.
Purim massacre in Piotrków Trybunalski	21 March 1943	Piotrków Trybunalski	Nazi Germany	10 Jews	Massacre committed during the Purim Jewish holiday.
Naliboki massacre	8 May 1943	Naliboki, modern-day Belarus (then eastern Poland)	(Soviet Union) Soviet NKVD	129 (including one child)	
Skałka Polska massacre	11 May 1943	Skałka Polska	Nazi Germany	93 Poles	
Warsaw Ghetto massacre	19 April–16 May 1943	Warsaw ghetto, Warsaw	Nazi Germany	13,000 Jews	6,000 Jews burnt to death by German forces.
Szarajówka massacre	18 May 1943	Szarajówka	Nazi Germany	58–67 Poles	
Kielce cemetery massacre	23 May 1943	Jewish Cemetery, Kielce	Nazi Germany	45 Jewish children	
Ispina massacre	2 June 1943	Ispina	Nazi Germany	13 Poles	
Strużki massacre	3 June 1943	Strużki	Nazi Germany	74+ Poles	
Fidury and Koziki massacre	13 June 1943	Fidury and Koziki	Nazi Germany	21 Poles	including children
Posądza massacre	22 June 1943	Posądza	Nazi Germany	7 Poles	including three children; retribution for rescuing Jews from the Holocaust
Majdan Nowy massacre	24 June 1943	Majdan Nowy	Nazi Germany	28–36 Poles	
Cegłów massacre	28 June 1943	Cegłów	Nazi Germany	26 Poles and an unknown number of Jews	including women and children; retribution for rescuing Jews from the Holocaust
Bukowina massacres	1 July, 24 October 1943, 6 January, 4 July 1944	Bukowina	Nazi Germany; Ukrainian Auxiliary Police	24–28 Poles	including women
Majdan Stary massacre	3 July 1943	Majdan Stary	Nazi Germany	75 Poles	
Liszki massacre	4 July 1943	Liszki	Nazi Germany	30 Poles	27 men and 3 women
Michniów massacre	12–13 July 1943	Michniów	Nazi Germany	about 204 Poles	including 48 children
Sikory-Tomkowięta massacre	13 July 1943	Sikory-Tomkowięta	Nazi Germany	49 Poles	
Łysa Góra massacre	13 July 1943	Łysa Góra near Zawady	Nazi Germany	58 Poles	
Krasowo-Częstki massacre	17 July 1943	Krasowo-Częstki	Nazi Germany	257 Poles	including 83 children under the age of 17
Wnory-Wandy massacre	21 July 1943	Wnory-Wandy	Nazi Germany	32 Poles	
Radwanowice massacre	21 July 1943	Radwanowice	Nazi Germany	30 Poles	
Gamratka massacre	27 July 1943	Gamratka	Nazi Germany	3 Jews and 2 Poles	retribution for rescuing Jews from the Holocaust
Jasionowo massacre	2 August 1943	Jasionowo	Nazi Germany	58 Poles	including 19 children
Szczurowa massacre	3 August 1943	Szczurowa	Nazi Germany	93 Romanis	
Wojciechów massacre	15 August 1943	Wojciechów	Nazi Germany	7 Poles	
Zamch massacre	16 August 1943	Zamch	Nazi Germany	8 Poles	
Wierzchowisko massacre	1 September 1943	Wierzchowisko	Nazi Germany	2 Poles and several Jews	retribution for rescuing Jews from the Holocaust
Drewnowo-Gołyń massacre	11 September 1943	Drewnowo-Gołyń	Nazi Germany	9 Poles	
Wodzisław massacre of 1943	September–October 1943	Wodzisław	Nazi Germany	318 Jews	
Tyczyn massacre	15 October 1943	Tyczyn	Nazi Germany	5 Poles	including one woman; retribution for rescuing Jews from the Holocaust
Wojciechów massacre	October 1943	Wojciechów	Nazi Germany	15 Jews and one Pole	
Kietlin massacre	October 1943	Kietlin	Nazi Germany	8 Jews and 3 Poles	including women and children; retribution for rescuing Jews from the Holocaust
Operation Harvest Festival	3–4 November 1943	Lublin District	Nazi Germany	43,000 Jews of Majdanek, Poniatowa and Trawniki	
Żyrardów massacre	18 November 1943	Żyrardów	Nazi Germany	24 Poles	
Massacres of Poles in Volhynia and Eastern Galicia (Volhynian slaughter)	1943–1945	Volhynia and Eastern Galicia	Ukrainian Insurgent Army	about 91,000 (±15,000) mostly Polish people	by far most of the victims were Poles, but also Ukrainians and people of ethnic minorities were killed
Jaworzno massacre	6 December 1943	Jaworzno	Nazi Germany	19	The victims were prisoners of a subcamp of Auschwitz.
Dąbrówka massacre	17 or 19 December 1943	Dąbrówka	Nazi Germany	9 Poles	eight additional Polish inhabitants arrested
Włodawa massacre of 1944	6 January 1944	Włodawa	Nazi Germany; Ukrainian Auxiliary Police	42 Poles	
Koniuchy massacre	29 January 1944	Koniuchy (now Kaniūkai, Lithuania)	(Soviet Union) Soviet NKVD and Jewish partisans	30–40 Poles	
Zwierzyniec massacre	2 February 1944	Zwierzyniec	Nazi Germany	20 Poles	including a 15-year-old boy
Huta Pieniacka massacre	28 February 1944	Huta Pieniacka	Ukrainian nationalists	500–1,200	
Wanaty massacre	28 February 1944	Wanaty	Nazi Germany	108 Poles	including 35 women and 47 children
Kurów massacre of 1944	6 March 1944	Kurów	Nazi Germany	45 Poles	Victims were captured resistance members from the region.
Jamy massacre	8 March 1944	Jamy	Nazi Germany	152 Poles	
Jabłoń-Dobki massacre	8 March 1944	Jabłoń-Dobki	Nazi Germany	91 Poles	including 31 women and 31 children
Markowa massacre	24 March 1944	Markowa	Nazi Germany	8 Poles and 8 Jews	retribution for rescuing Jews from the Holocaust
Smoligów massacre	27 March 1944	Smoligów	Nazi Germany	66–232 Poles	
Poturzyn massacre	1 April 1944	Poturzyn	14th Waffen Grenadier Division of the SS; UPA	162 Poles	
Sielczyk massacre	12 April 1944	Sielczyk	14th Waffen Grenadier Division of the SS	9 Poles	Victims were men and women, aged between 20 and 75.
Chodaczków Wielki massacre	16 April 1944	Chodaczków Wielki	Nazi Germany	862 Poles	including children
Moroczyn massacre	14 May 1944	Moroczyn	Nazi Germany; Ukrainian Auxiliary Police	8 Poles	
Sochy massacre	1 June 1944	Sochy	Nazi Germany	181–200 Polish civilians	
Sulmice massacre	4 June 1944	Sulmice	Nazi Germany	several Poles	Dozens additional Polish inhabitants arrested.
Olszanka massacre	5 June 1944	Olszanka	Nazi Germany	around 100	including children
Glinciszki massacre	20 June 1944	Glinciszki	Lithuanian Auxiliary Police	39 Poles	including 11 women, 11 children, and 6 elderly men
Wodzisław massacre of 1944	8 July 1944	Wodzisław	Nazi Germany	13 Poles	
Lublin Castle massacre	22 July 1944	Lublin	Nazi Germany	over 300 Poles and Jews	
Międzyrzec Podlaski massacre of 1944	23 July 1944	Międzyrzec Podlaski	Nazi Germany	60 Italian POWs	
Chłaniów and Władysławin massacre	23 July 1944	Chłaniów-Kolonia and Władysławin	Ukrainian Legion of Self-Defense	44–45 Poles	
Pęcice massacre	2 August 1944	Pęcice	Nazi Germany	65 Poles	Victims were partisans, mostly young people, including five women.
Nur massacre	4 August 1944	Nur	Nazi Germany	around 120 Poles	
Ochota massacre	4–25 August 1944	Ochota, Warsaw	Nazi Germany	10,000 Polish civilians	Including gang rape, looting and arson.
Wola massacre	5–12 August 1944	Wola, Warsaw	Nazi Germany	40,000–50,000 Poles	about 30,000 killed during the first three days
Małaszek massacre	31 August 1944	Małaszek	Nazi Germany	over 30 Poles	including women and children
Plewki massacre	31 August 1944	Plewki	Nazi Germany	11 Poles	
Liquidation of the insurgent hospitals in Warsaw's Old Town	2 September 1944	Warsaw	Nazi Germany	up to 7,000 Poles	including wounded insurgents and civilians
Lipniak-Majorat massacre	2 September 1944	Lipniak-Majorat	Nazi Germany	around 450 Poles	including women and children
Jamna massacre	26 September 1944	Jamna	Nazi Germany	23 Poles	
Bloody Christmas Eve in Ochotnica Dolna	23 December 1944	Ochotnica Dolna	Nazi Germany	56 Poles	including 19 children and 21 women
Nieławice massacre	31 December 1944 – 1 January 1945	Nieławice	Nazi Germany	56 Poles	including 32 children under the age of 14
Przyrów massacre	8 January 1945	Przyrów	Nazi Germany	43 Poles	
Skarszew massacre	16 and 19 January 1945	Skarszew	Nazi Germany	70 Poles	Victims were resistance members.
Gliwice massacre	18–19 January 1945	Gliwice	Nazi Germany	dozens	The victims were prisoners of two subcamps of Auschwitz.
Czechowice massacre	21 January 1945	Czechowice	Nazi Germany	several	The victims were prisoners of a subcamp of Auschwitz.
Zawady Małe massacre	21–22 January 1945	Zawady Małe	Nazi Germany	110 Poles and 7 Russians	
Marchwacz massacre	21–22 January 1945	Marchwacz	Nazi Germany	63 Polish civilians, 12 Soviet POWs	
Dąbrówka Nowa Massacre	22 January 1945	Dąbrówka Nowa	Soviet Union	over 100 Latvians	
Kortowo massacre	22 January 1945	Kortowo	Soviet Union	around 600	
Biadki massacre	23 January 1945	Biadki	Soviet Union	18 Hungarian POWs	
Łomnica massacre	24 January 1945	Łomnica	Nazi Germany	17	Massacre committed during a death march.
Miechowice massacre	25–27 January 1945	Miechowice	Soviet Union	380	
Stary Jaromierz massacre	26 January 1945	Stary Jaromierz	Nazi Germany	38 Jewish women	Massacre committed during a death march.
Przyszowice massacre	26–28 January 1945	Przyszowice	Soviet Union	54–69	
Wesoła massacre	27 January 1945	Wesoła	Nazi Germany	around 239	The victims were prisoners of a subcamp of Auschwitz.
Halemba massacre	28 January 1945	Halemba	Soviet Union	35 civilians and 8 Italian POWs	
Kuźnica Żelichowska massacre	28 January 1945	Kuźnica Żelichowska	Nazi Germany	6 Italian POW generals	
Podgaje massacre	31 January 1945	Podgaje	Nazi Germany	160–210 Polish POWs	
Leśno massacre	9 February 1945	Leśno	Nazi Germany	64 Jewish women	
Pawłokoma massacre	3 March 1945	Pawłokoma	Poles	150–366 Ukrainians	
Słupsk massacre	7 March 1945	Słupsk	Nazi Germany	22	
Wierzchowiny massacre	6 June 1945	Wierzchowiny	National Armed Forces	50-196	
Augustów roundup	10-25 July 1945	Suwałki and Augustów regions	Soviet Union	about 600 anti-communist	Out of 2,000 arrested by the Soviet forces, about 600 have disappeared.
Zawadka Morochowska massacres	25 January, 28 March, and 13 April 1946	Zawadka Morochowska	Polish People's Army	73 Ukrainians and Lemkos	
1946 pacification of villages by PAS NZW	February 1946	Bielsk and Hajnówka County	Rajs' unit	79 Belarusians	
Werbkowice massacre	20 February 1946	Werbkowice	UPA	8 Polish soldiers	
Liwcze massacre of 1946	28 March 1946	Liwcze	UPA	31 Polish policemen	
Zamołodycze massacre	31 March 1946	Zamołodycze	UPA	5–8 Polish civilians	
Mircze massacre of 1946	25 May 1946	Mircze	UPA	24 Polish soldiers	
Kielce pogrom	4 July 1946	Kielce	Poles	38–42 Jews	
Żuków massacre	21 November 1946	Żuków	UPA	5 Poles	Four civilians and a policeman.
Poznań June	28–30 June 1956	Poznań	LWP, KBW, SB	57–100 civilians	Approximately 600 civilians wounded.
December events	14–19 December 1970	Gdynia, Gdańsk, Szczecin, Elbląg	LWP, MO, ZOMO	At least 44 civilians	1,000+ civilians wounded.
Pacification of Wujek	16 December 1981	Wujek Coal Mine, Katowice	ZOMO	9 striking miners	Further 23 people wounded.
Lubin massacre	31 August 1982	Lubin	Milicja Obywatelska	3 striking miners	Further 11 people wounded.

== Bibliography ==
- Bartniczak, Mieczysław (1974). "Eksterminacja ludności w powiecie Ostrów Mazowiecka w latach okupacji hitlerowskiej (1939–1944)". Rocznik Mazowiecki (in Polish). No. 5.
- Datner, Szymon (1968). Las sprawiedliwych (in Polish). Warszawa: Książka i Wiedza.
- Datner, Szymon (1961). Zbrodnie Wehrmachtu na jeńcach wojennych armii regularnych w II wojnie światowej [Wehrmacht crimes against prisoners of war in World War II] (in Polish). Wydawnictwo MON.
- Hamerska, Małgorzata (2012). "Miejsca pamięci narodowej w powiecie chojnickim". Zeszyty Chojnickie (in Polish). No. 27. Chojnice: Chojnickie Towarzystwo Przyjaciół Nauk.
- Jastrzębski, Stanisław (2007). Ludobójstwo nacjonalistów ukraińskich na Polakach na Lubelszczyźnie w latach 1939–1947 (in Polish). Wrocław: Wydawnictwo Nortom. ISBN 978-83-89684-04-2.
- Markiewicz, Marcin (2003). "Represje hitlerowskie wobec wsi białostockiej". Biuletyn Instytutu Pamięci Narodowej (in Polish). No. 12–1 (35–36). IPN. ISSN 1641-9561.
- Monkiewicz, Waldemar (1988). "Pacyfikacje wsi w regionie białostockim (1939, 1941–1944)". Białostocczyzna (in Polish). No. 1 (9). Białystok: Białostockie Towarzystwo Naukowe. ISSN 0860-4096.
- Sudoł, Tomasz (2011). "Zbrodnie Wehrmachtu na jeńcach polskich we wrześniu 1939 roku". Biuletyn Instytutu Pamięci Narodowej (in Polish). No. 8-9 (129-130). IPN. ISSN 1641-9561.
- Wardzyńska, Maria (2009). Był rok 1939. Operacja niemieckiej policji bezpieczeństwa w Polsce. Intelligenzaktion (in Polish). Warszawa: IPN.
- Rejestr miejsc i faktów zbrodni popełnionych przez okupanta hitlerowskiego na ziemiach polskich w latach 1939–1945. Województwo kieleckie (in Polish). Warszawa: Ministerstwo Sprawiedliwości. Główna Komisja Badania Zbrodni Hitlerowskich w Polsce. 1980.
