= Sitno, Zamość County =

Sitno
- Village
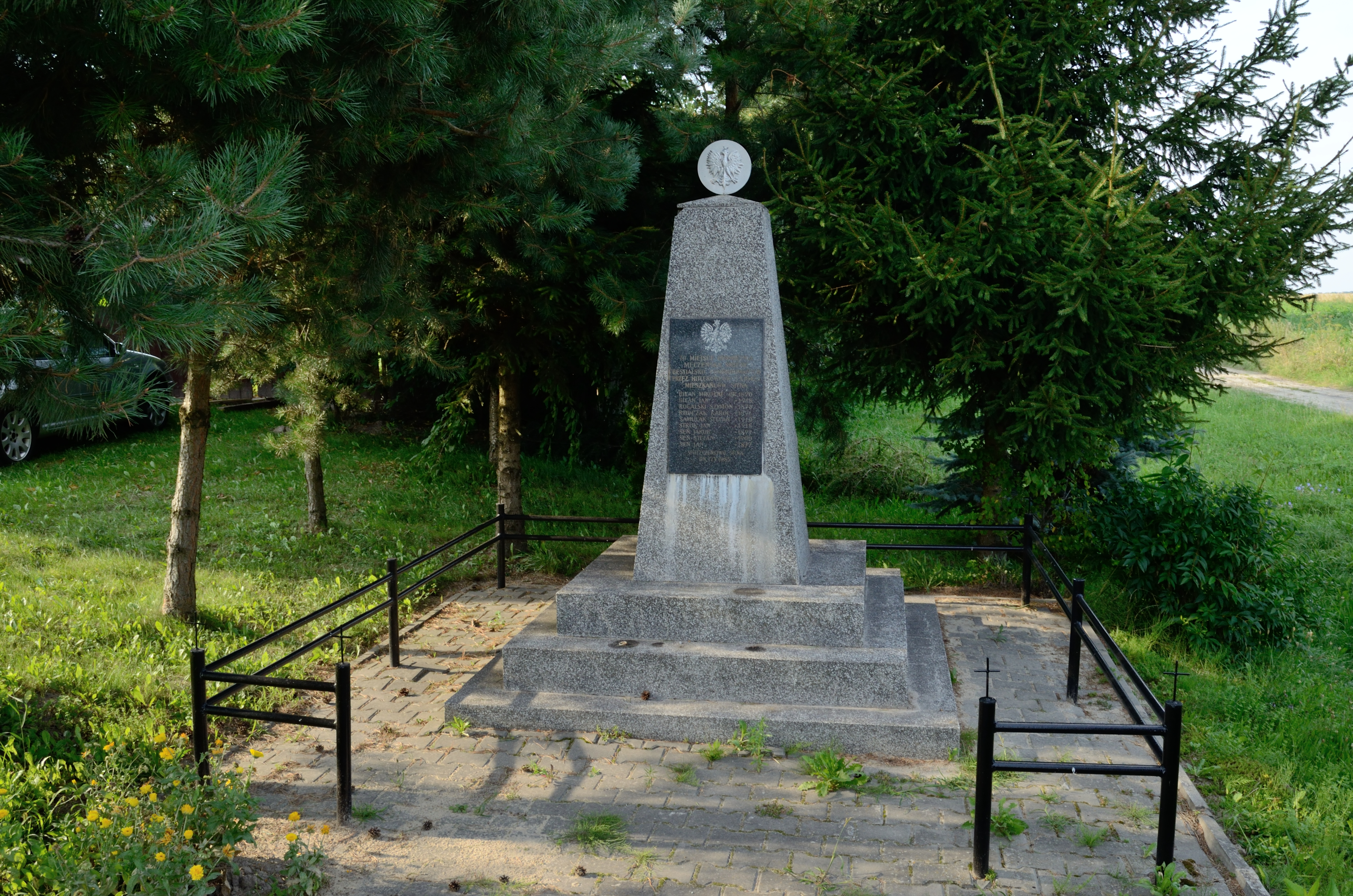
- Memorial to local victims of Nazi Germany in World War II

- Location within Poland
- Coordinates: 50°45′9″N 23°22′18″E
- Country: Poland
- Voivodeship: Lublin
- County: Zamość
- Gmina: Sitno

Population
  - Total: 703
- Time zone: UTC+1 (CET)
  - Summer (DST): UTC+2 (CEST)
- Vehicle registration: LZA

Sitno ([ˈɕitnɔ]) is a village in Zamość County, Lublin Voivodeship, in eastern Poland. It is the seat of the gmina (administrative district) called Gmina Sitno.

== History ==
15 Polish citizens were murdered by Nazi Germany in the village during World War II.
