= Boży Dar, Zamość County =

Boży Dar
- Village
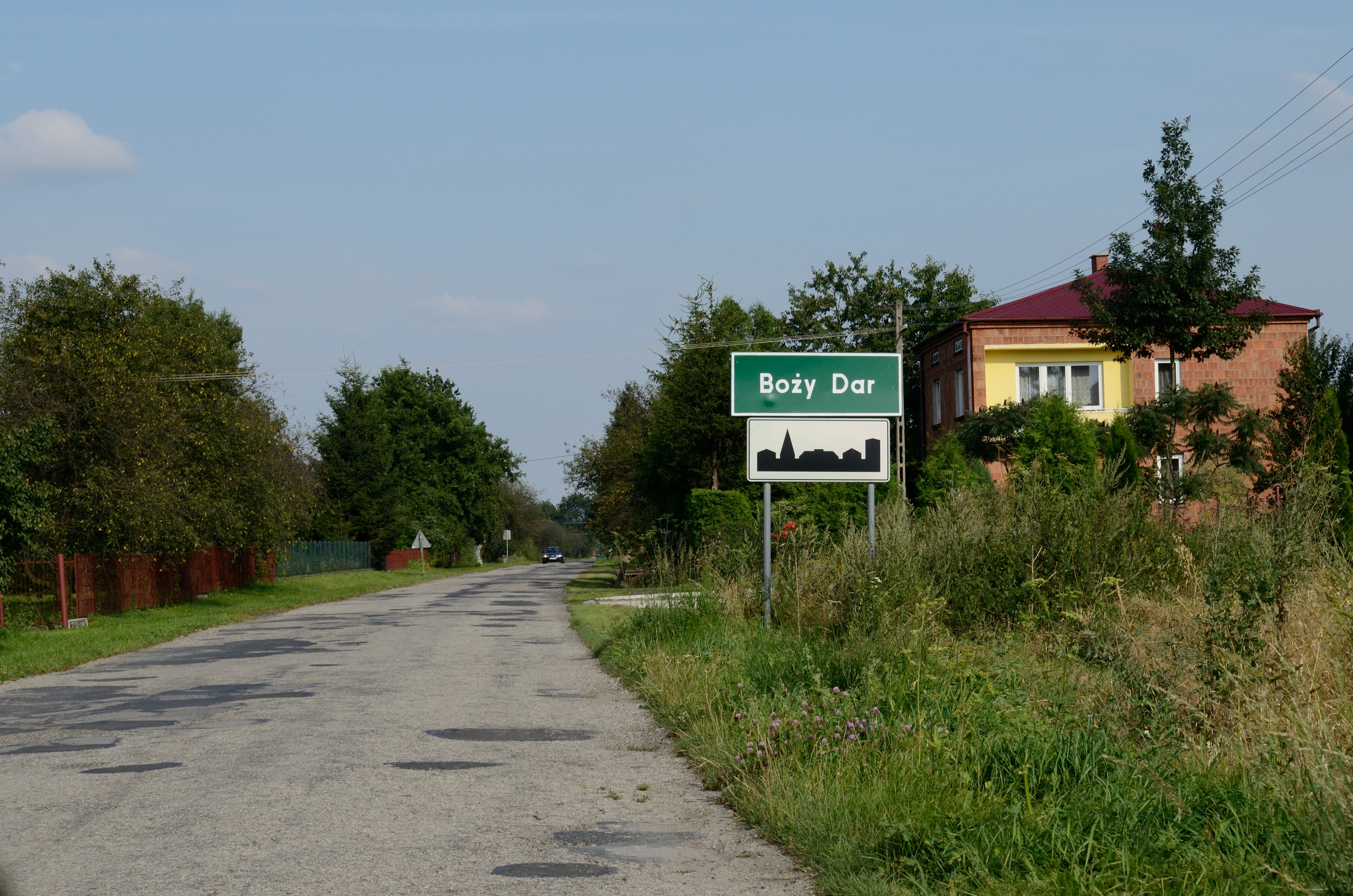

- Location within Poland
- Coordinates: 50°42′15″N 23°24′07″E
- Country: Poland
- Voivodeship: Lublin
- County: Zamość
- Gmina: Sitno
- Time zone: UTC+1 (CET)
  - Summer (DST): UTC+2 (CEST)
- Vehicle registration: LZA

Boży Dar [ˈbɔʐɨ ˈdar] is a village in the administrative district of Gmina Sitno, within Zamość County, Lublin Voivodeship, in eastern Poland.
