= Wólka Horyszowska =

- Village
- Location within Poland
- Coordinates: 50°44′N 23°25′E
- Country: Poland
- Voivodeship: Lublin
- County: Zamość
- Gmina: Sitno

Wólka Horyszowska [ˈvulka xɔrɨˈʂɔfska] is a village in the administrative district of Gmina Sitno, within Zamość County, Lublin Voivodeship, in eastern Poland.
