= Karp, Lublin Voivodeship =

Karp
- Village
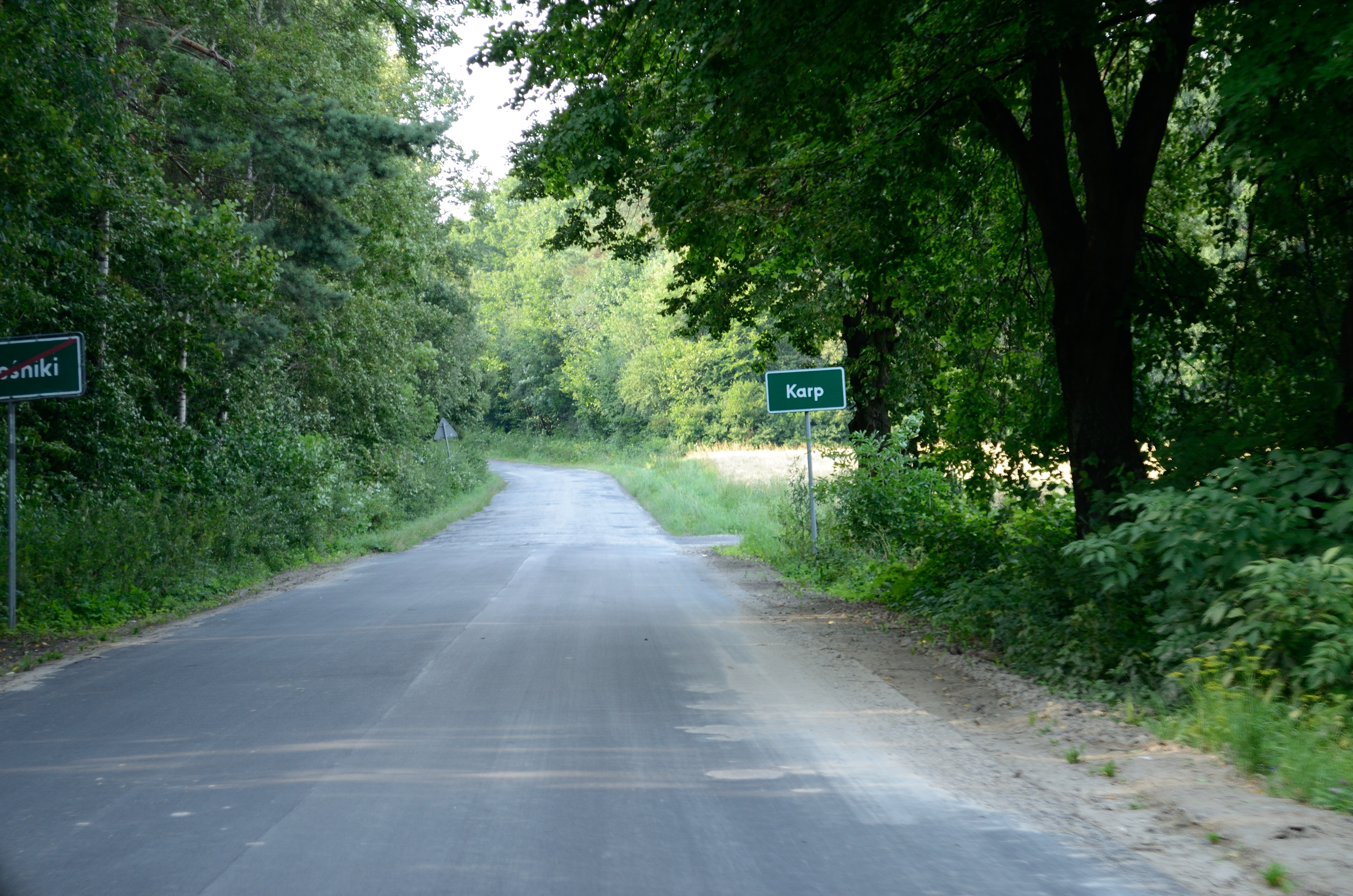
- Road sign in Karp

- Location within Poland
- Coordinates: 50°43′19″N 23°25′31″E
- Country: Poland
- Voivodeship: Lublin
- County: Zamość
- Gmina: Sitno

Karp [karp] is a village in the administrative district of Gmina Sitno, within Zamość County, Lublin Voivodeship, in eastern Poland.
