= Czołki =

- Village
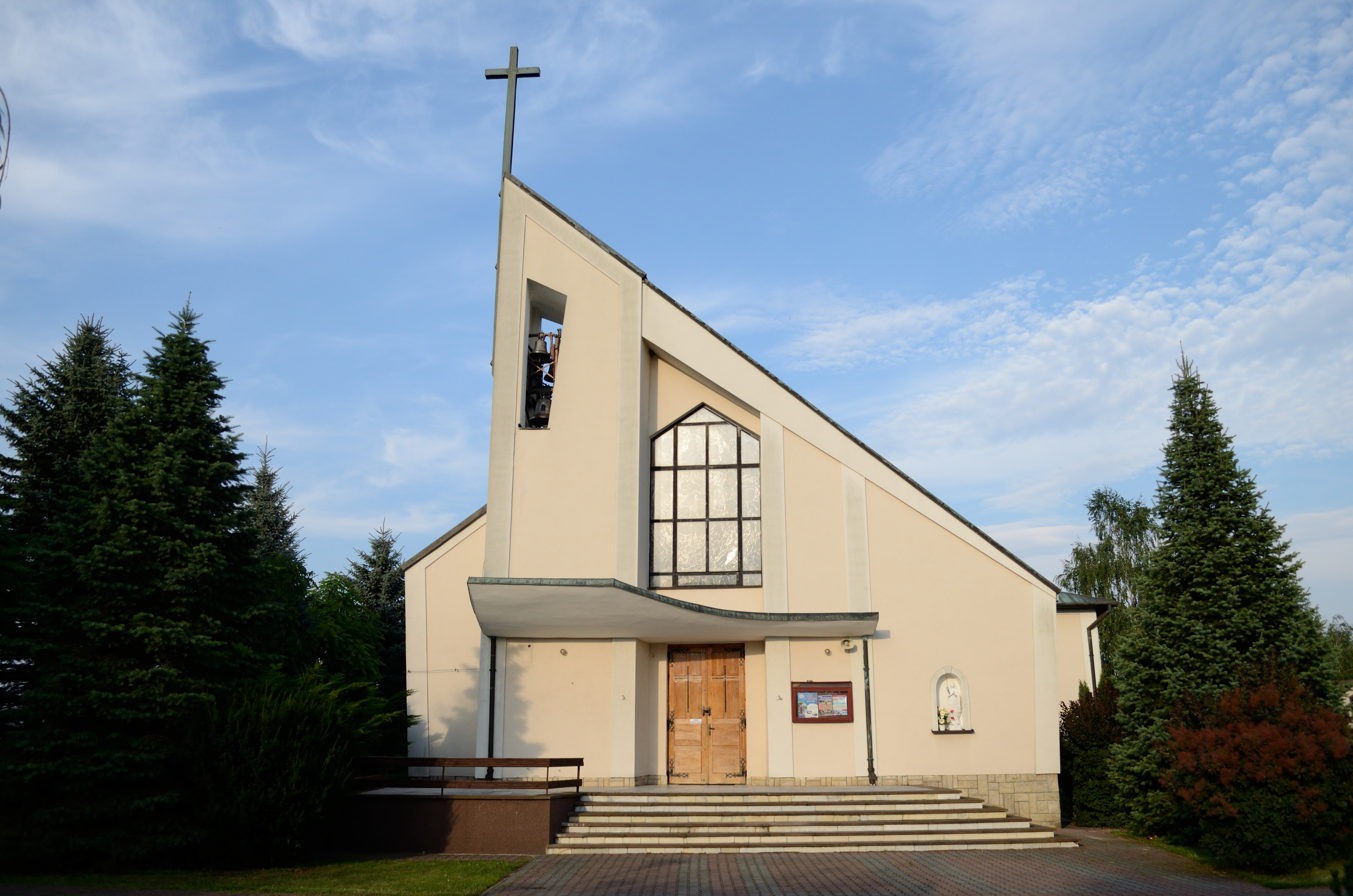
- Our Lady of Częstochowa church in Czołki

- Location within Poland
- Coordinates: 50°46′N 23°19′E
- Country: Poland
- Voivodeship: Lublin
- County: Zamość
- Gmina: Sitno
- Time zone: UTC+1 (CET)
  - Summer (DST): UTC+2 (CEST)
- Vehicle registration: LZA

Czołki [ˈt͡ʂɔu̯ki] is a village in the administrative district of Gmina Sitno, within Zamość County, Lublin Voivodeship, in eastern Poland.
