= Stabrów =

- Village
- Location within Poland
- Coordinates: 50°43′52″N 23°22′29″E
- Country: Poland
- Voivodeship: Lublin
- County: Zamość
- Gmina: Sitno

Stabrów [ˈstabruf] is a village in the administrative district of Gmina Sitno, within Zamość County, Lublin Voivodeship, in eastern Poland.
