= Kolonia Sitno =

- Village
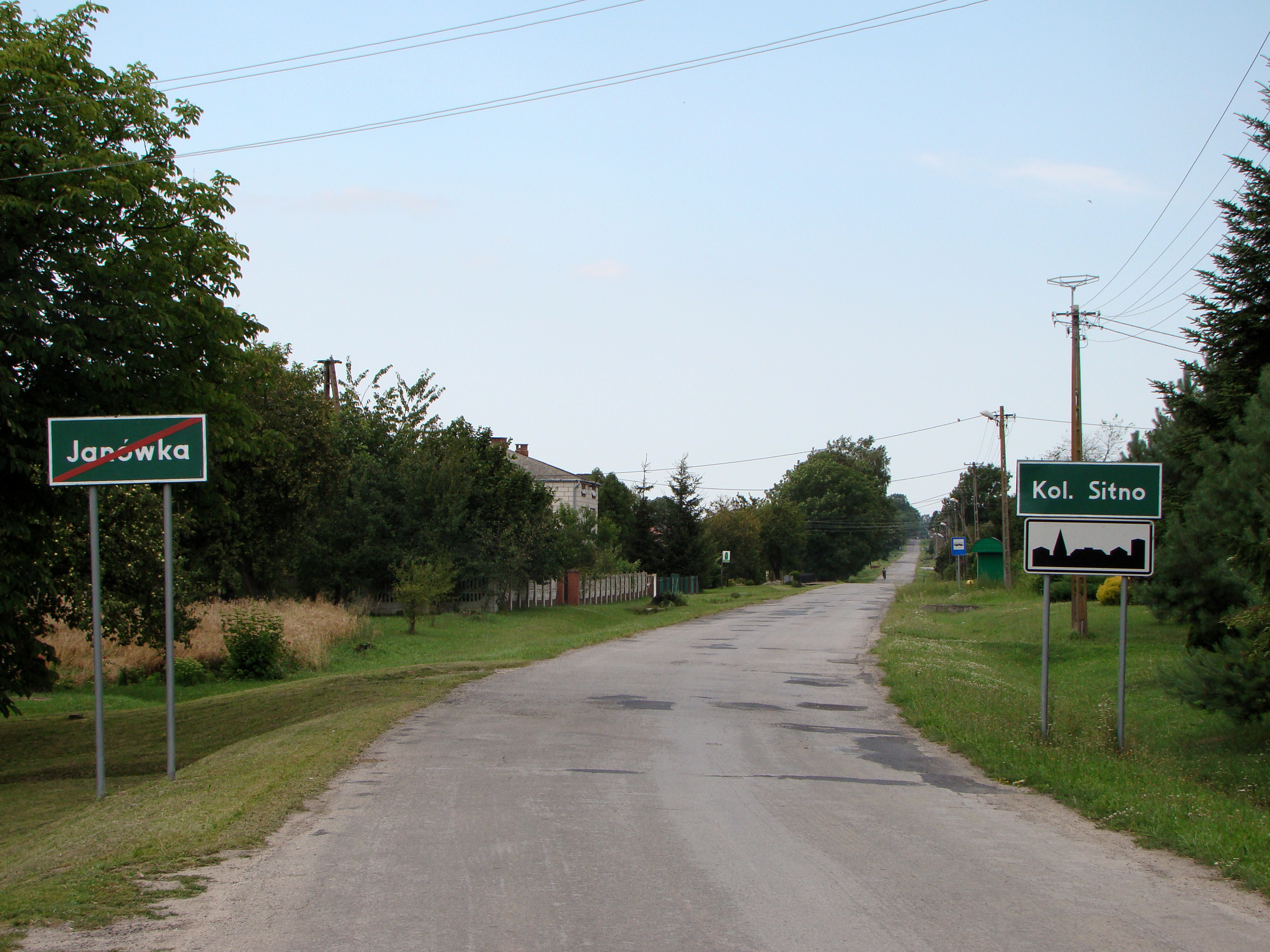
- Road through the village

- Location within Poland
- Coordinates: 50°45′42″N 23°22′33″E
- Country: Poland
- Voivodeship: Lublin
- County: Zamość
- Gmina: Sitno

Kolonia Sitno [ˈɕitnɔ kɔˈlɔɲa] is a village in the administrative district of Gmina Sitno, within Zamość County, Lublin Voivodeship, in eastern Poland.
