= Wnory-Wandy massacre =

1943 Nazi war crime in occupied Poland

- Part of the Nazi crimes against the Polish nation
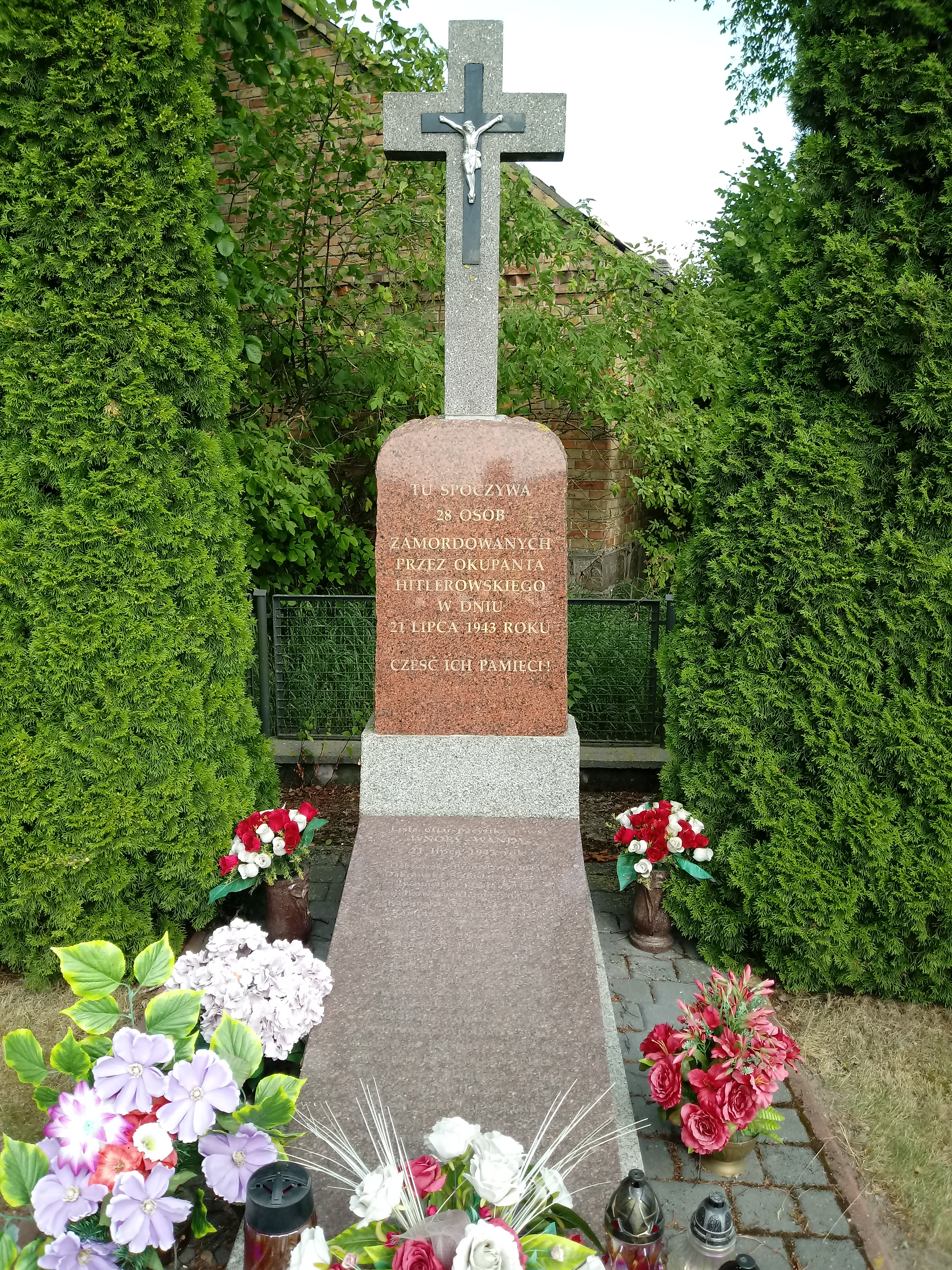
- Memorial Cross at the mass grave of the victims of the Wnory-Wandy massacre
- Location: 53°3′N 22°35′E; Wnory-Wandy, Poland
- Date: 21 July 1943
- Target: Village inhabitants
- Attack type: War crime
- Deaths: 27–32
- Perpetrators: Ordnungspolizei, Schutzstaffel

Wnory-Wandy massacre was a Nazi war crime committed by the Ordnungspolizei and Schutzstaffel in the village of Wnory-Wandy within occupied Poland. On July 21, 1943, the village was completely destroyed, and at least 27 of its inhabitants, predominantly women and children, were killed. The massacre was a retaliatory act against the civilian population following the killing of a German agricultural commissar by Polish partisans.

== Prelude ==
Wnory-Wandy is a village in Wysokie Mazowieckie County, located near the road that connects Wysokie Mazowieckie with the Białystok–Warsaw road. In 1943, the village had approximately 40 households and more than 200 inhabitants. During the Nazi German occupation of Poland, no Polish underground cell was active in the village.

In July 1943, near Wnory-Wandy, Polish partisans killed a German agricultural commissar from Kulesze Kościelne. In retaliation, the occupying authorities decided to pacify the village.

== The massacre ==
Early in the morning of July 21, 1943, Wnory-Wandy was surrounded by a German punitive expedition. Remembering the pacification of the neighboring village of Sikory-Tomkowięta, carried out a week earlier, the residents feared Nazi reprisals. As a result, most of them spent the night in the surrounding fields and meadows. Among those who stayed in the village, some managed to escape in advance, alerted by the roar of German engines. However, the Nazis captured several dozen people.

The captured residents were forced out of their homes and herded into Józef Wnorowski's barn. Several men were ordered to dig a mass grave. When they eventually refused to continue, peasants from neighboring villages were brought in and forced to complete the task. Meanwhile, livestock and movable property were seized from the farms.

Once the grave was ready, the executions began. Victims were led to the edge of the pit and shot with machine guns. After the massacre, the Germans set fire to the buildings. Six Poles, who had been hiding, perished in the flames. The stolen goods were transported to the municipal commissar's office in Kulesze Kościelne.

It is difficult to determine the exact number of victims. The files from the investigation conducted by the District Commission for the Investigation of Nazi Crimes in Białystok include the names of 27 victims. The inscription on the monument in Wnory-Wandy lists 28 victims, a figure also cited in some studies. Meanwhile, The Register of places and facts of crimes committed by the Nazi Occupier on Polish Lands in 1939–1945 lists 29 names, although two are repeated for unclear reasons. Other sources mention 32 victims.

The documents from the District Commission indicate that the victims included thirteen women and six children. The youngest victim was one month old, while the oldest was 71 years old. The village was completely destroyed. Among the stolen property, the Germans took 47 horses, 200 cows, approximately 100 sheep, and 150 pigs.

The massacre was carried out by German gendarmes from the posts in Kulesze Kościelne, Kobylin-Borzymy, and Rutki-Kossaki, supported by a punitive expedition from Białystok. According to Jerzy Smurzyński, SS men from the special unit Kommando "Müller," responsible for numerous other crimes in the Łomża region, played a key role in the pacification.

Documents from the District Commission in Białystok indicate that the following individuals, among others, were present in Wnory-Wandy during the massacre: the municipal commissar in Kulesze Kościelne, Litzman; the agricultural commissar in Kulesze, Karl Wasch; the commandant of the gendarmerie post in Kulesze Kościelne, Neumann; his deputy, Bezirk; as well as gendarmes Borunk (or Borünek), Zimmermann, Alojzy Fraszek (or Frascheck), Hetke (or Hetkie), Muzon, and Baumann.

== Aftermath ==
A few days after the massacre, residents of neighboring Polish villages constructed a grave for the victims. The Nazis prohibited the village's reconstruction.

After the war, Wnory-Wandy was rebuilt. A small monument was erected at the site of the massacre.

== Bibliography ==
- Fajkowski, Józef (1972). Wieś w ogniu. Eksterminacja wsi polskiej w okresie okupacji hitlerowskiej [A countryside on fire. The extermination of the Polish villages during the Nazi occupation] (in Polish). Warszawa: Ludowa Spółdzielnia Wydawnicza.
- Fajkowski, Józef; Religa, Jan (1981). Zbrodnie hitlerowskie na wsi polskiej 1939–1945 [Nazi crimes in the Polish countryside 1939–1945] (in Polish). Warszawa: Książka i Wiedza.
- Gnatowski, Michał; Monkiewicz, Waldemar; Kowalczyk, Józef (1981). Wieś białostocka oskarża. Ze studiów nad eksterminacją wsi na Białostocczyźnie w latach wojny i okupacji hitlerowskiej [The villages of Białystok region accuse. From studies on the extermination of villages in the Białystok region during the war and Nazi occupation] (in Polish). Białystok: Okręgowa Komisja Badania Zbrodni Hitlerowskich and Ośrodek Badań Naukowych in Białystok. ISBN 83-00-00323-1.
- Laskowski, Jan, ed. (1985). Rejestr miejsc i faktów zbrodni popełnionych przez okupanta hitlerowskiego na ziemiach polskich w latach 1939–1945. Województwo łomżyńskie [Register of places and facts of crimes committed by the Nazi Occupier on Polish Lands in the years 1939–1945. Łomża Voivodeship] (in Polish). Warszawa: GKBZHwP-IPN.
- Markiewicz, Marcin (2003–2004). "Represje hitlerowskie wobec wsi białostockiej" [Nazi repressions against the villages in Białystok region]. Biuletyn IPN (in Polish). 12–1 (35–36). ISSN 1641-9561.
- Monkiewicz, Waldemar; Kowalczyk, Józef (1986). Bez przedawnienia. Pacyfikacje wsi białostockich w latach 1939, 1941–1944 [Without the statute of limitations. Pacification of Białystok region’s villages in the years 1939, 1941–1944] (in Polish). Białystok: Krajowa Agencja Wydawnicza. ISBN 83-03-01263-0.
- Smurzyński, Jerzy (1997). Czarne lata na łomżyńskiej ziemi. Masowe zbrodnie hitlerowskie w roku 1939 i latach 1941–1945 w świetle dokumentów [Dark years on the land of Łomża. Mass Nazi crimes in 1939 and 1941–1945 in the light of documents] (in Polish). Łomża: Towarzystwo Przyjaciół Ziemi Łomżyńskiej. ISBN 83-902985-2-X.
