= Gmina Sitno =

Gmina Sitno Sitno Commune
- Gmina
- Coat of arms
- Interactive map of Gmina Sitno
- Coordinates (Sitno): 50°46′N 23°22′E
- Country: Poland
- Voivodeship: Lublin
- County: Zamość County
- Seat: Sitno

Area
  - Total: 112.07 km^{2} (43.27 sq mi)

Population (2013)
  - Total: 6,855
  - Density: 61.17/km^{2} (158.4/sq mi)
- Website: http://www.gmina.sitno.pl/

Gmina Sitno is a rural gmina (administrative district) in Zamość County, Lublin Voivodeship, in eastern Poland. Its seat is the village of Sitno, which lies approximately 10 kilometres (6 mi) north-east of Zamość and 78 km (48 mi) south-east of the regional capital Lublin.

The gmina covers an area of 112.07 square kilometres (43.3 sq mi), and as of 2006 its total population is 6,774 (6,855 in 2013).

The gmina contains part of the protected area called Skierbieszów Landscape Park.

== Villages ==
Gmina Sitno contains the villages and settlements of Boży Dar, Cześniki, Cześniki-Kolonia, Cześniki-Kolonia Górna, Czołki, Horyszów Polski, Horyszów-Nowa Kolonia, Horyszów-Stara Kolonia, Janówka, Jarosławiec, Jarosławiec Górny, Karp, Kolonia Kornelówka, Kolonia Sitno, Kornelówka, Rozdoły, Sitno, Stabrów, Stanisławka and Wólka Horyszowska.

== Neighbouring gminas ==
Gmina Sitno is bordered by the city of Zamość and by the gminas of Grabowiec, Komarów-Osada, Łabunie, Miączyn, Skierbieszów and Zamość.
