= Rozdoły, Lublin Voivodeship =

Rozdoły
- Village
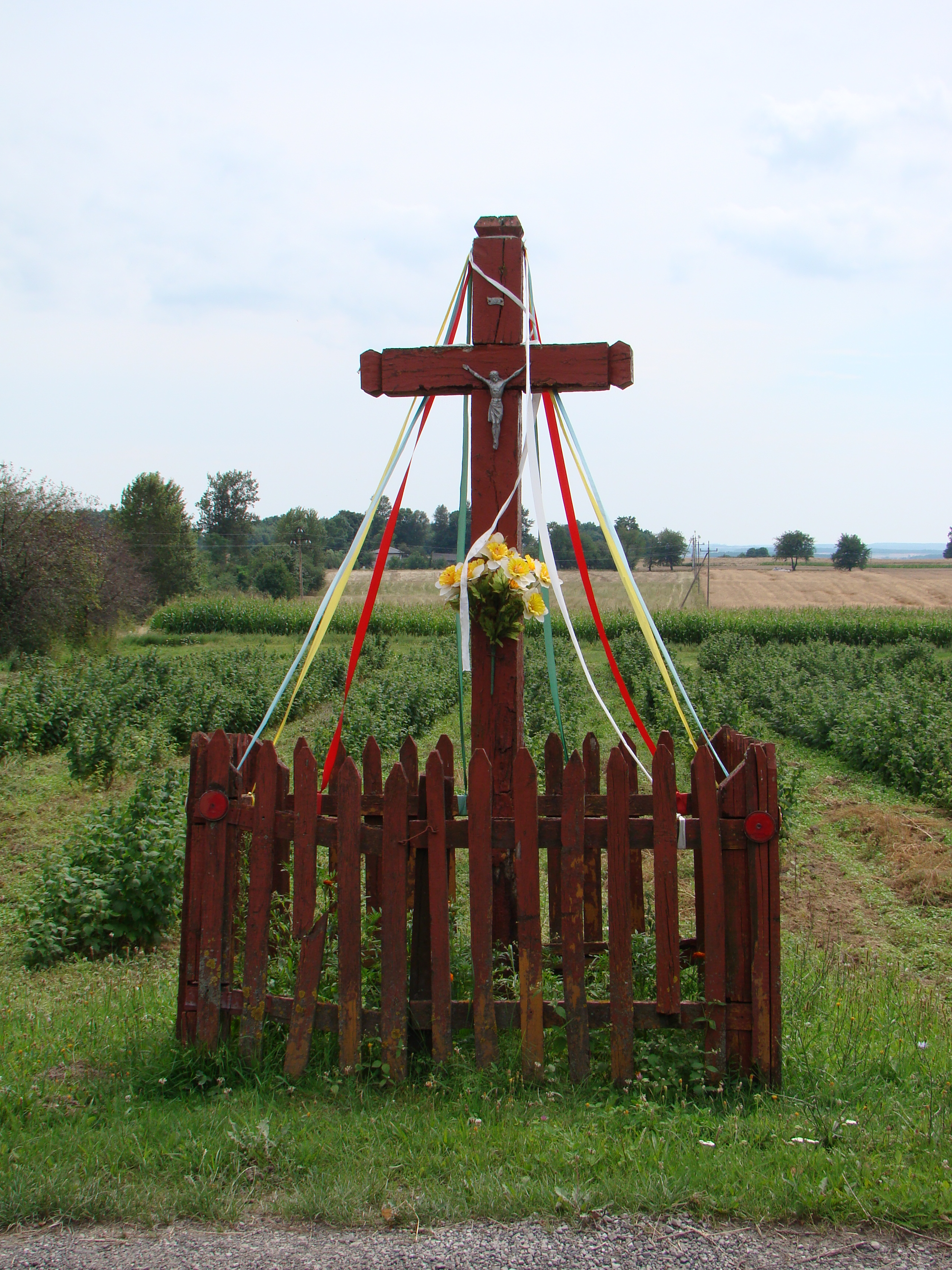
- Wayside cross in Rozdoły

- Location within Poland
- Coordinates: 50°46′54″N 23°24′38″E
- Country: Poland
- Voivodeship: Lublin
- County: Zamość
- Gmina: Sitno

Rozdoły [rɔzˈdɔwɨ] is a village in the administrative district of Gmina Sitno, within Zamość County, Lublin Voivodeship, in eastern Poland.
