= Cześniki-Kolonia Górna =

- Village
- Location within Poland
- Coordinates: 50°42′03″N 23°28′07″E
- Country: Poland
- Voivodeship: Lublin
- County: Zamość
- Gmina: Sitno

Cześniki-Kolonia Górna [t͡ʂɛɕˈniki kɔˈlɔɲa ˈɡurna] is a village in the administrative district of Gmina Sitno, within Zamość County, Lublin Voivodeship, in eastern Poland.
