= Janówka, Zamość County =

Janówka
- Village
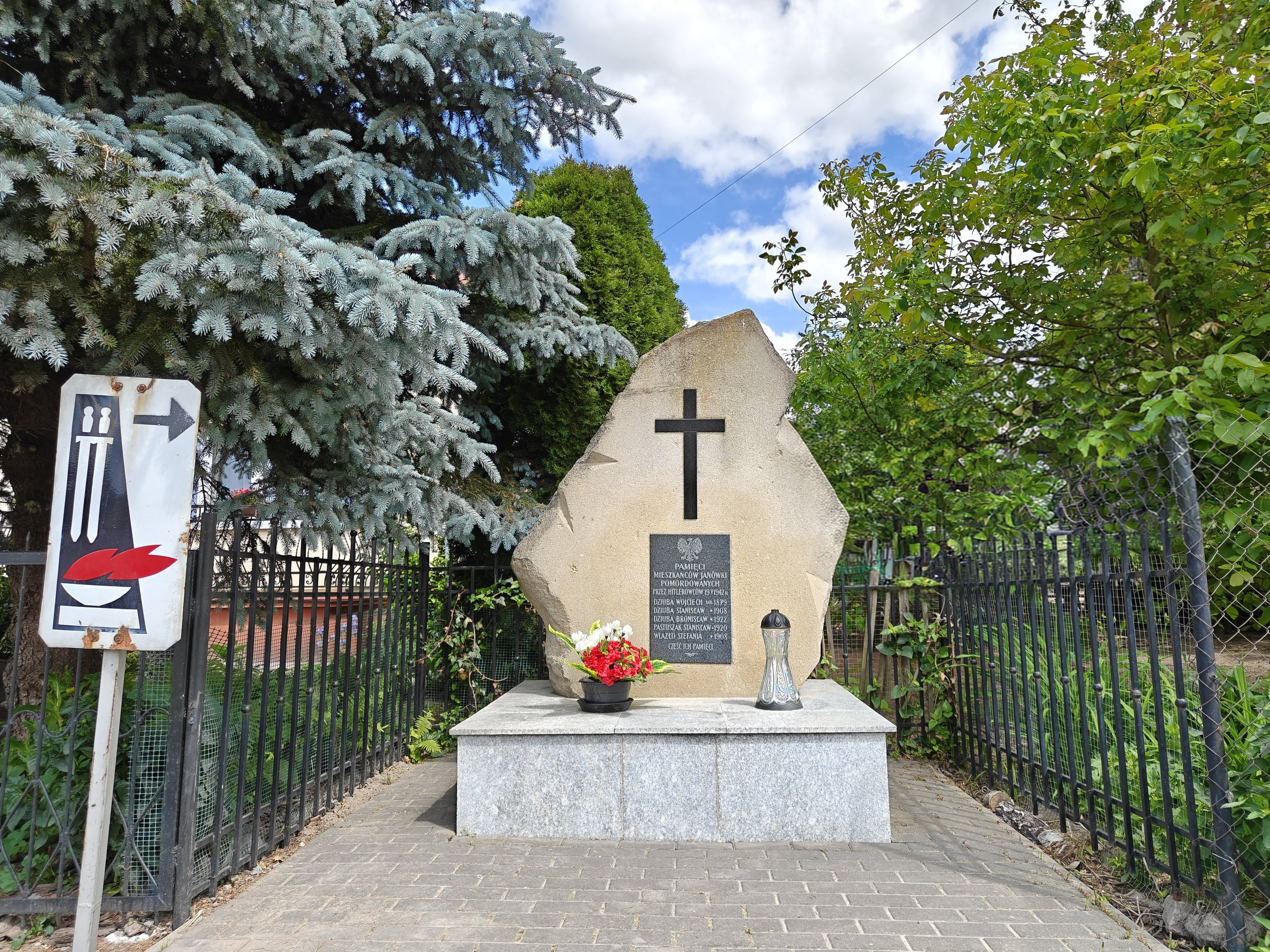
- A memorial to the inhabitants of Janówka murdered by the Nazis on 19 May 1942

- Location within Poland
- Coordinates: 50°45′44″N 23°24′04″E
- Country: Poland
- Voivodeship: Lublin
- County: Zamość
- Gmina: Sitno
- Time zone: UTC+1 (CET)
  - Summer (DST): UTC+2 (CEST)

Janówka [jaˈnufka] is a village in the administrative district of Gmina Sitno, within Zamość County, Lublin Voivodeship, in eastern Poland.

== History ==
Six Polish citizens were murdered by Nazi Germany in the village during World War II.
