= Horyszów-Stara Kolonia =

- Village
- Location within Poland
- Coordinates: 50°44′44″N 23°26′54″E
- Country: Poland
- Voivodeship: Lublin
- County: Zamość
- Gmina: Sitno

Horyszów-Stara Kolonia [xɔˈrɨʂuf ˈstara kɔˈlɔɲa] is a village in the administrative district of Gmina Sitno, within Zamość County, Lublin Voivodeship, in eastern Poland.
