= Stanisławka, Zamość County =

Stanisławka
- Village
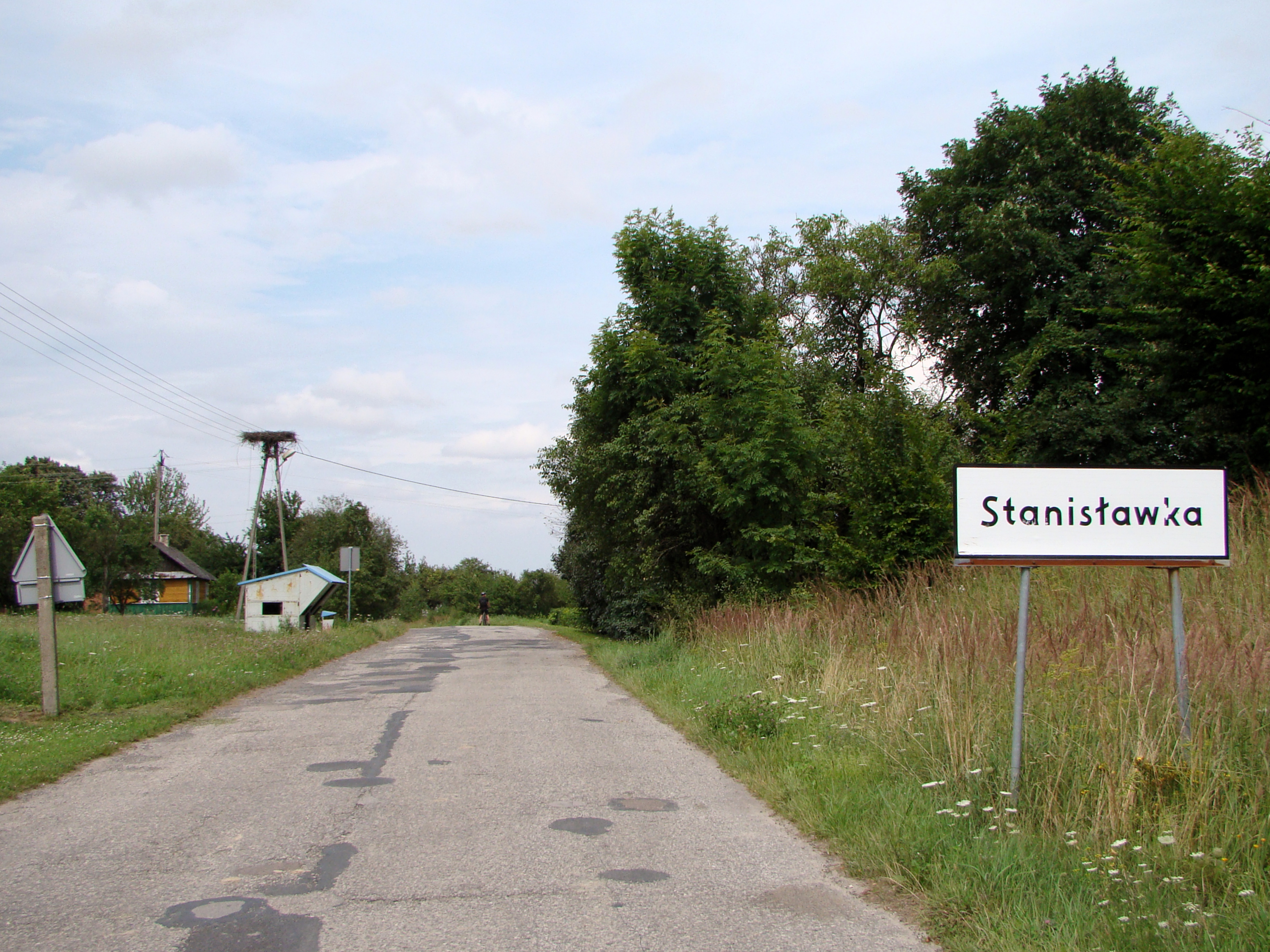

- Location within Poland
- Coordinates: 50°48′N 23°26′E
- Country: Poland
- Voivodeship: Lublin
- County: Zamość
- Gmina: Sitno

Stanisławka [staniˈswafka] is a village in the administrative district of Gmina Sitno, within Zamość County, Lublin Voivodeship, in eastern Poland.

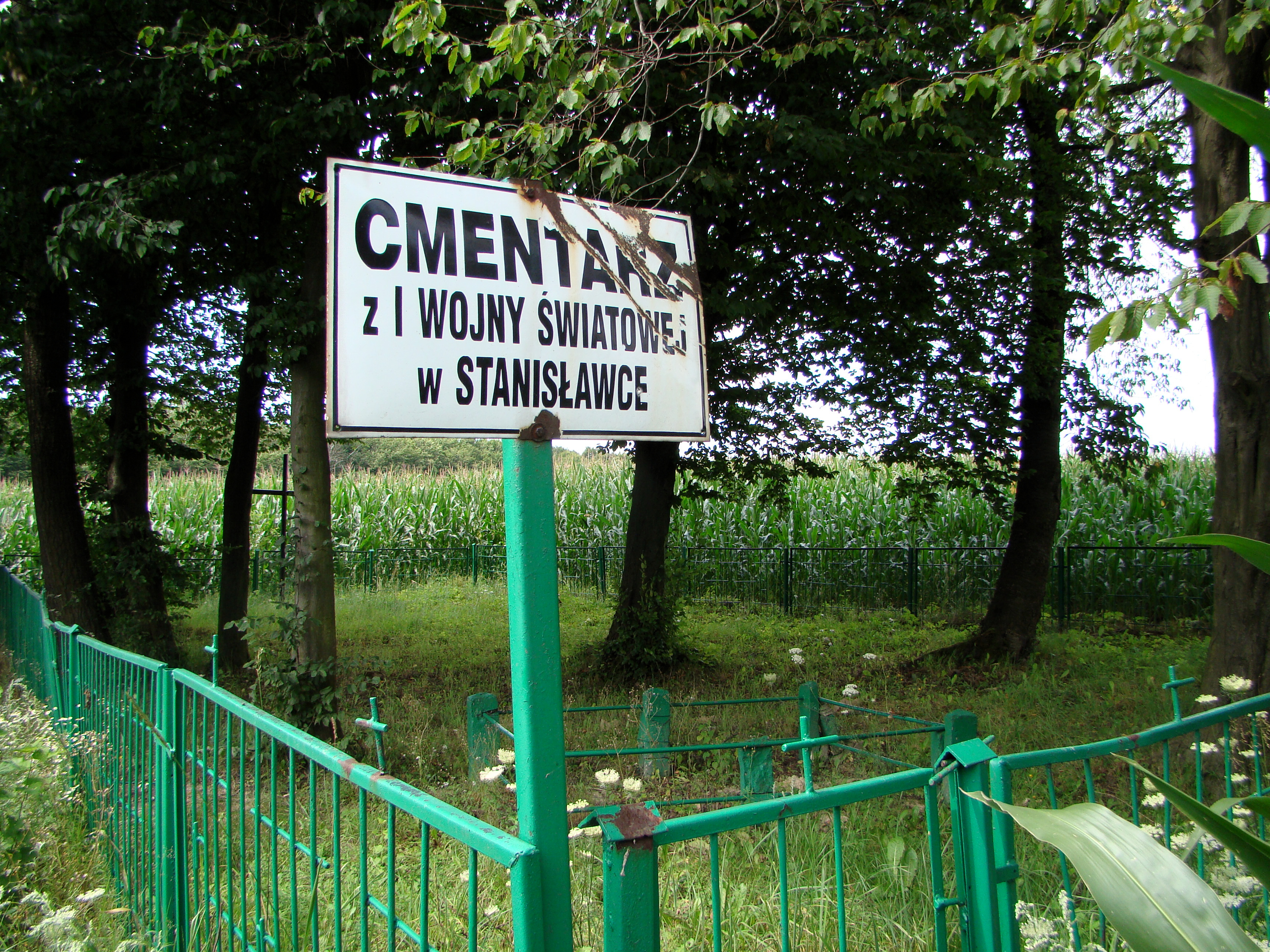
World War I cemetery

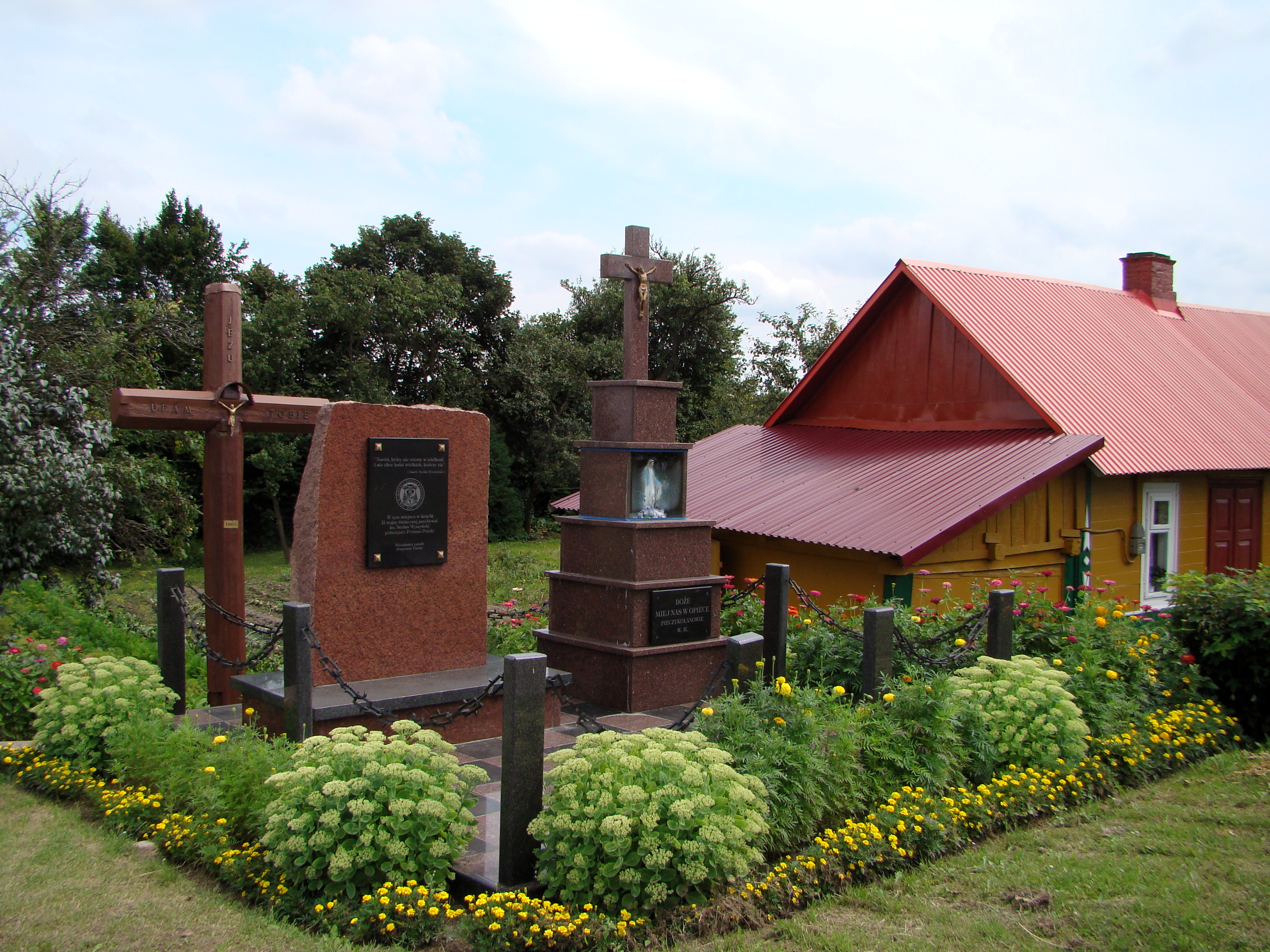
"Priest Stefan Wyszyński was hiding here during WW II"

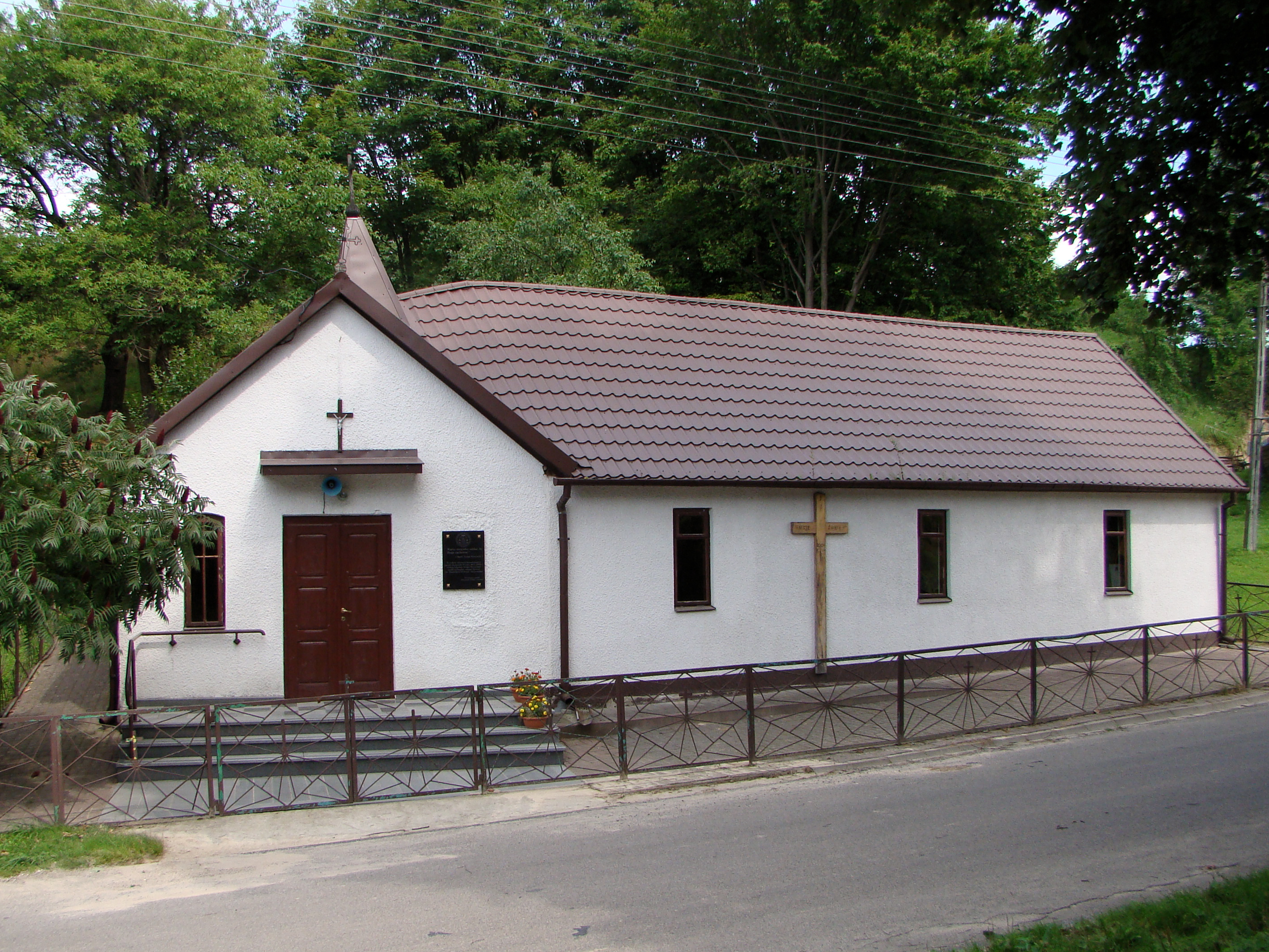
Chapel
