= Horyszów-Nowa Kolonia =

- Village
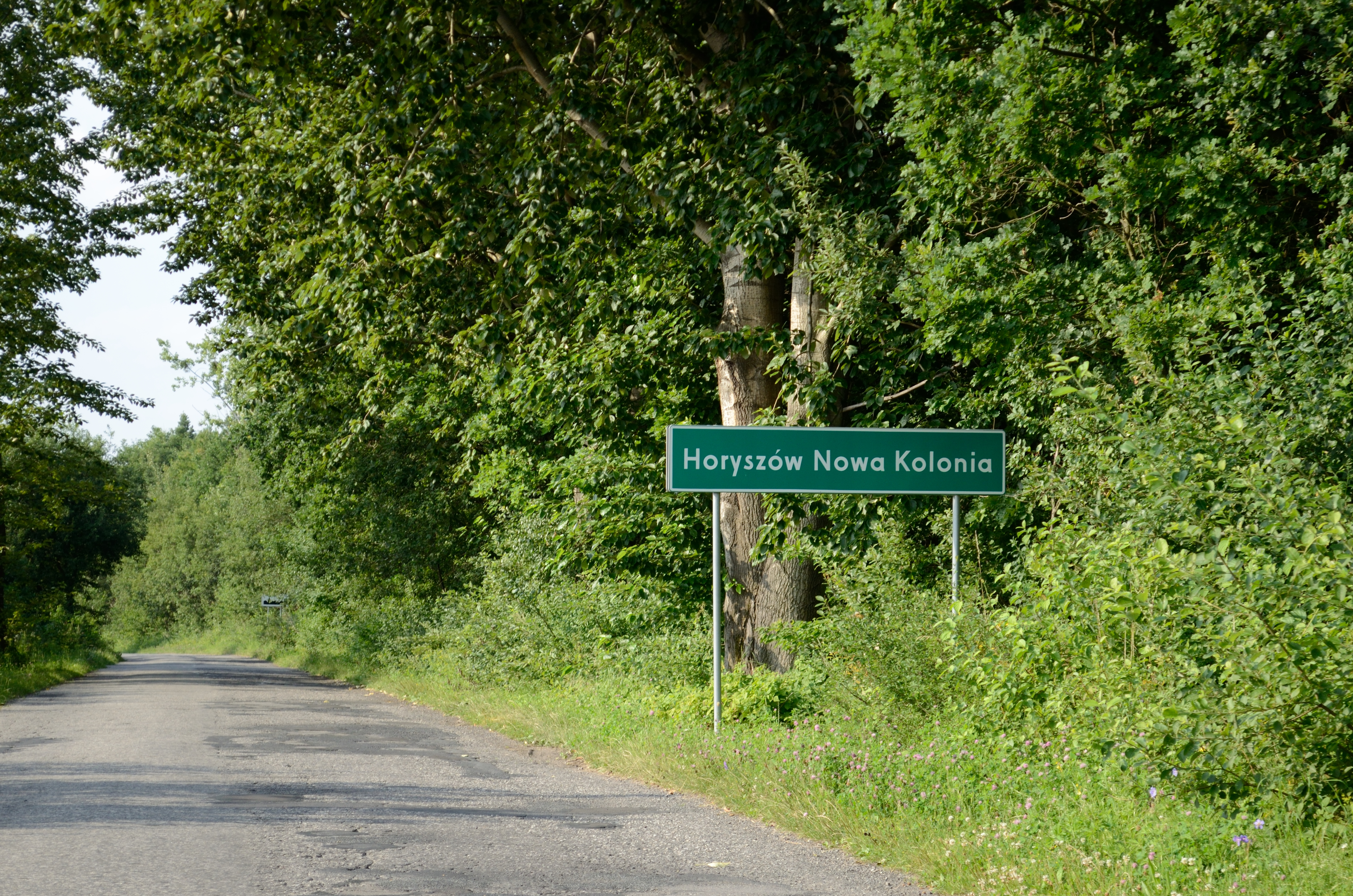

- Location within Poland
- Coordinates: 50°44′15″N 23°25′46″E
- Country: Poland
- Voivodeship: Lublin
- County: Zamość
- Gmina: Sitno
- Time zone: UTC+1 (CET)
  - Summer (DST): UTC+2 (CEST)
- Vehicle registration: LZA

Horyszów-Nowa Kolonia [xɔˈrɨʂuf ˈnɔva kɔˈlɔɲa] is a village in the administrative district of Gmina Sitno, within Zamość County, Lublin Voivodeship, in eastern Poland.
