= Kornelówka, Lublin Voivodeship =

Kornelówka
- Village
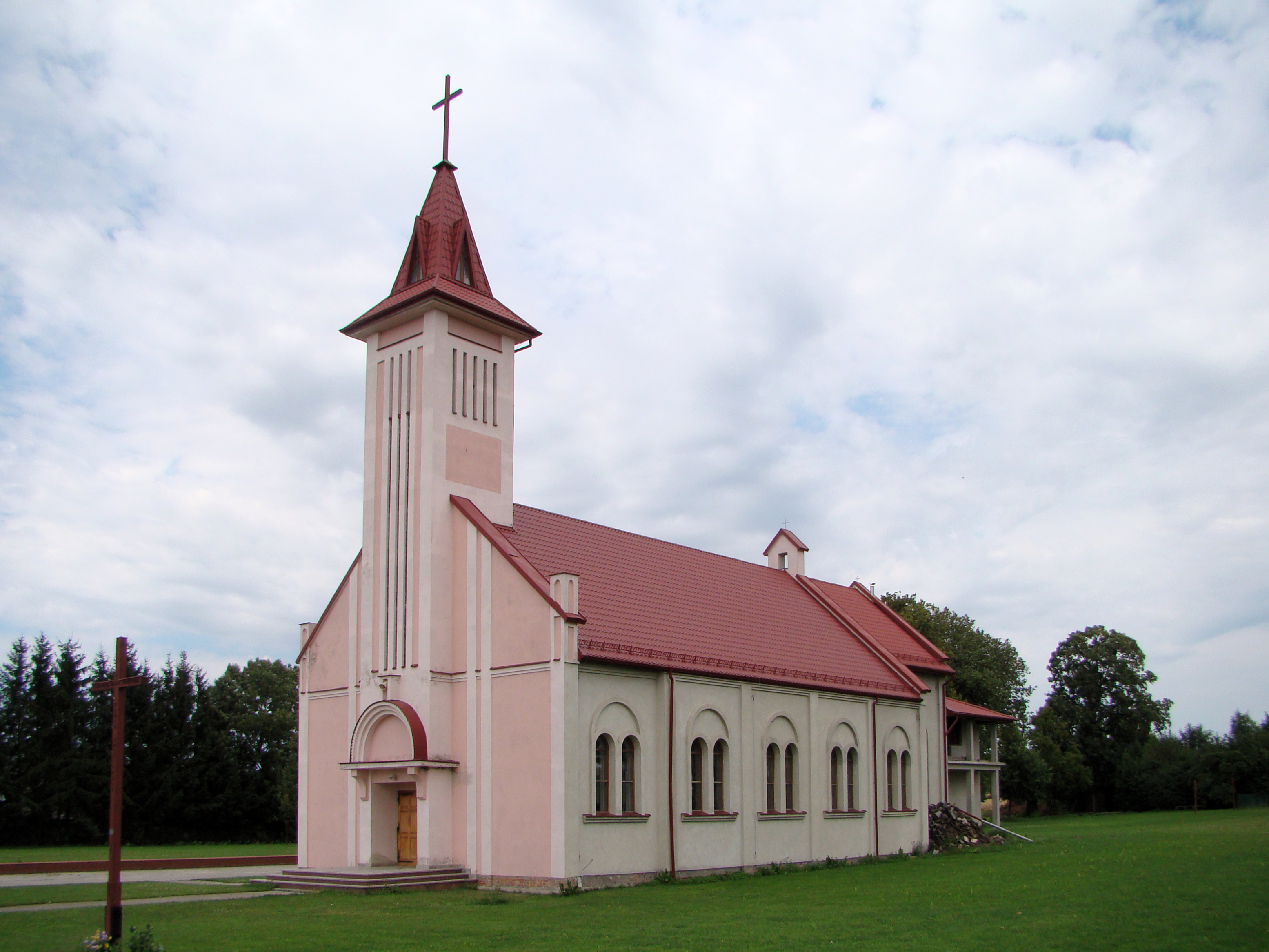
- Saint Peter and Paul Church in Kornelówka

- Location within Poland
- Coordinates: 50°46′N 23°20′E
- Country: Poland
- Voivodeship: Lublin
- County: Zamość
- Gmina: Sitno

Kornelówka [kɔrnɛˈlufka] is a village in the administrative district of Gmina Sitno, within Zamość County, Lublin Voivodeship, in eastern Poland.
