= Szarajówka massacre =

Nazi massacre in Poland

- Part of Occupation of Poland (1939–1945)
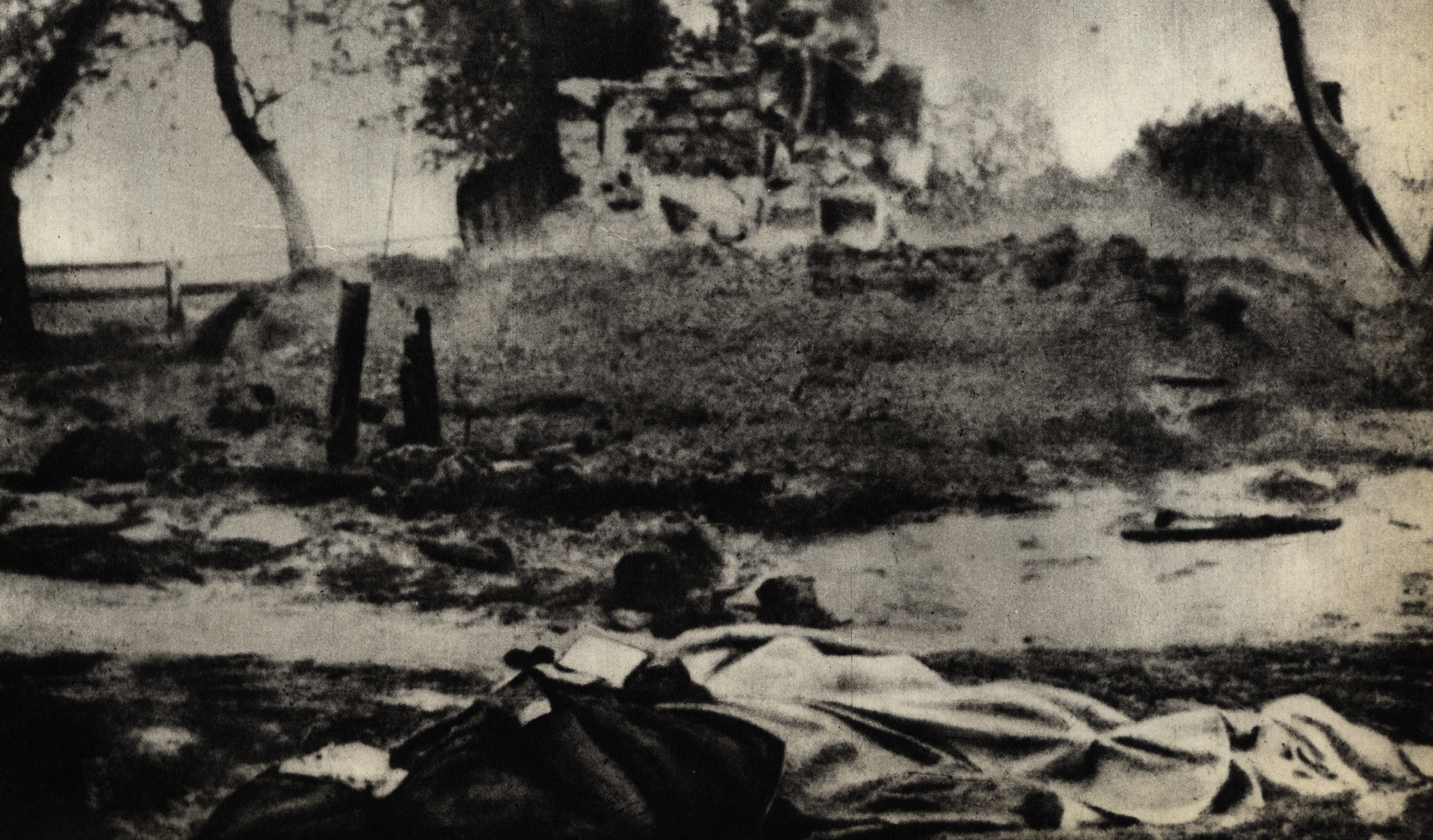
- Ruins of Szarajówka after the massacre
- Location: 50°22′13″N 22°50′59″E; Szarajówka, Poland
- Date: May 18, 1943
- Target: Village inhabitants
- Attack type: War crime
- Deaths: 58–67
- Perpetrators: Ordnungspolizei, Ukrainian Auxiliary Police

The Szarajówka massacre was a Nazi war crime perpetrated by the Ordnungspolizei and Ukrainian Auxiliary Police in the village of Szarajówka within occupied Poland. Occurring on May 18, 1943, this pacification action claimed the lives of up to 67 inhabitants, among whom were numerous women and children, many of whom were burned alive. The village was ransacked and completely burned. This atrocity was part of the ethnic cleansing of the Zamość region and was additionally seen as retribution against the civilian population for their support of the Polish resistance movement.

== Background ==
Szarajówka, situated in Biłgoraj County, is a small village that actively supported the Polish partisans during the Nazi-German occupation. Some accounts suggest that its inhabitants provided aid to Jewish refugees in hiding and to Soviet prisoners of war who had escaped from German captivity.

In the autumn of 1942, at the direction of SS-Brigadeführer Odilo Globocnik, SS and Police Leader in the Lublin district of the General Government, a significant Nazi displacement operation commenced in the Zamość region. Its aim was to remove around 100,000 Poles from this area and replace them with German settlers, primarily comprising ethnic Germans from various European countries. The initial displacements began on the night of November 27-28, 1942, extending to 60 villages housing approximately 34,000 individuals by the end of December. The second phase of the operation lasted from mid-January to the end of March 1943 and covered mainly the areas of the Hrubieszów County. Inhabitants of 63 villages were then displaced.

The Nazi actions faced passive resistance from the displaced populace and armed responses from the Polish resistance movement. Partisan units from the Peasant Battalions (Bataliony Chłopskie), Home Army (Armia Krajowa), and communist People's Guard (Gwardia Ludowa) attempted to impede pacification and displacement efforts, targeting German police, economic sites, and transportation facilities. They also conducted retaliatory actions in villages settled by German colonists.

== The massacre ==
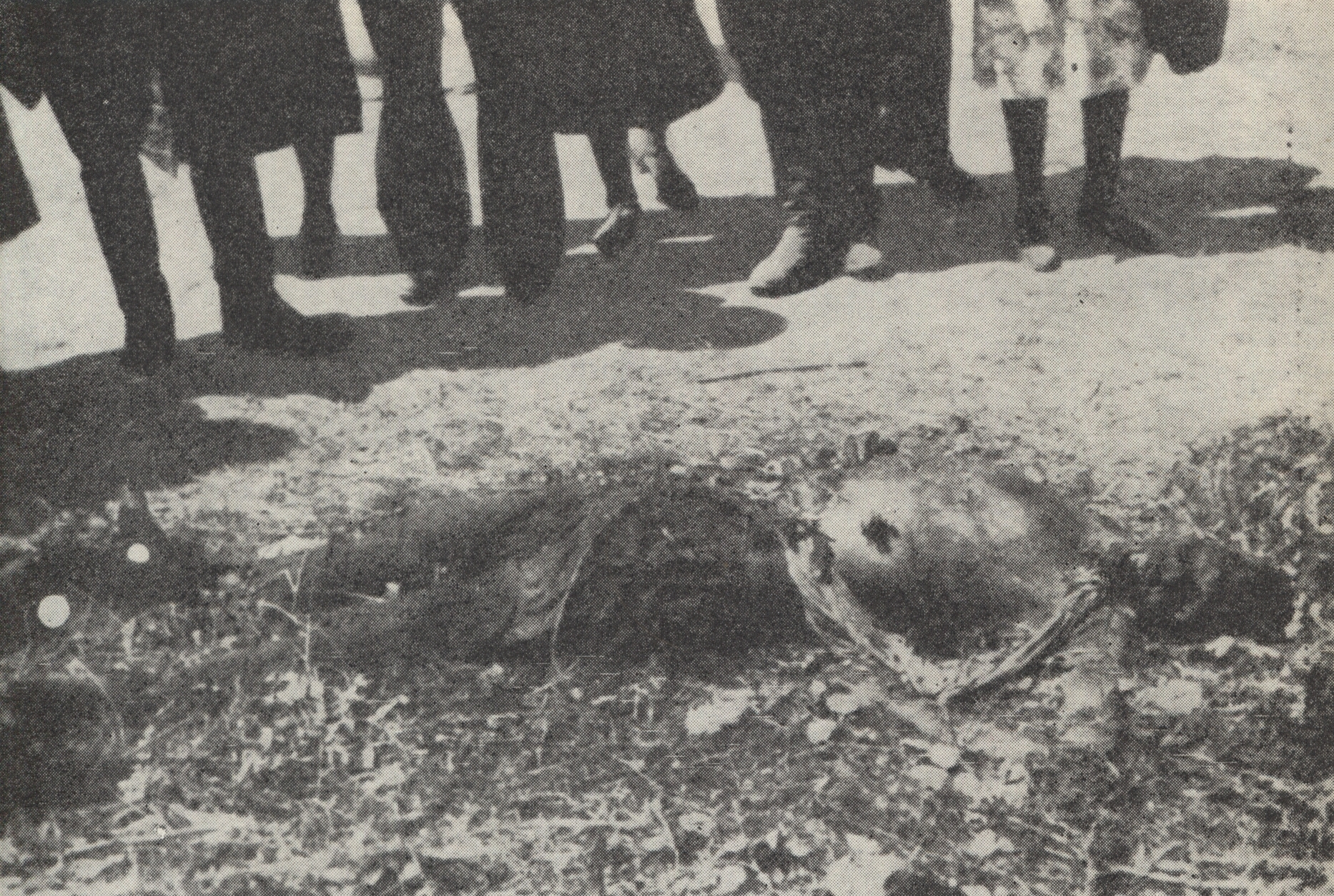
The body of one of the massacre's victims

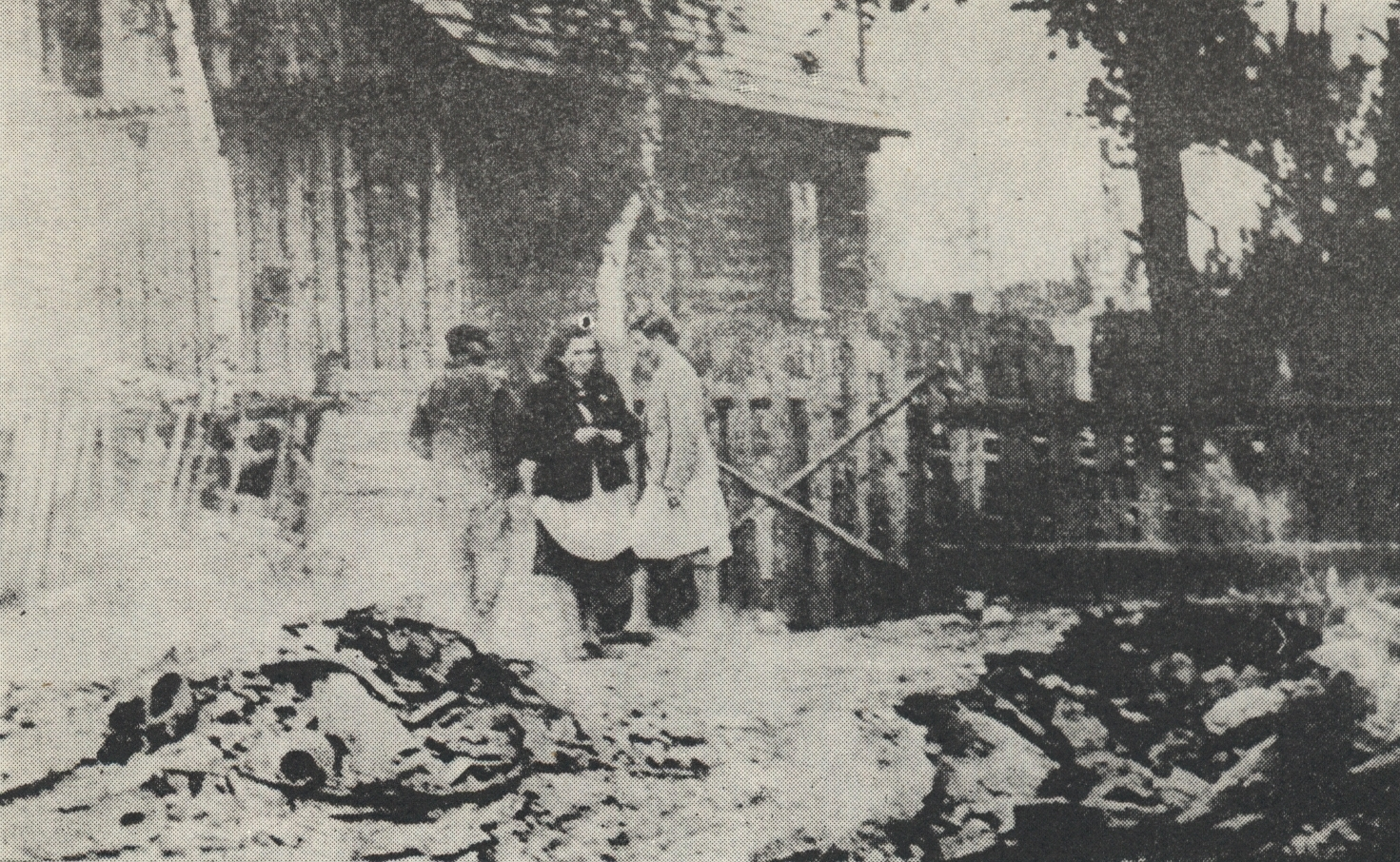
The ruins of Szarajówka

On the morning of May 18, 1943, a punitive expedition composed of German gendarmes and members of the Ukrainian Auxiliary Police (Note: Włodzimierz Darmochwał, the commandant of the Ukrainian Auxiliary Police in Tarnogród, led the Ukrainian collaborators. See: Fajkowski (1972), p. 168.) from Biłgoraj and Tarnogród arrived in Szarajówka. Around 9:00 a.m., villagers noticed the village was encircled, sparking panic among them. Soon after, the Germans and Ukrainians entered the village, forcing residents out of their homes and gathering them in the square opposite farmer Saniak's farm. Initially, women and children were treated with some leniency, while men endured harsh interrogations in attempts to extract information about Polish partisans. Several individuals suffered severe beatings, rendering them unable to walk to the execution site unaided. Meanwhile, the assailants looted livestock and valuable belongings from the farms.

By midday, the commander of the punitive expedition directed all residents of Szarajówka to a few selected buildings. Many were assembled in Maciej Mołda's stable, while others were taken to structures owned by Józef Klecha and Stanisław Krzeszowiec. Once all the victims were inside, the Germans and Ukrainians sealed the doors and windows, covered the buildings with straw, and set them ablaze. Only one woman managed to escape briefly, but she was promptly shot. Subsequently, the assailants set fire to the remaining buildings in Szarajówka. By approximately 3:30 p.m., the punitive expedition departed the devastated village. A handful of survivors managed to evade the massacre by hiding within the village and escaping amidst the smoke from burning structures. (Note: Władysław Wierzbowski, who survived the massacre, claimed that only five people managed to escape from the village. See: Fajkowski (1972), p. 168–169.) Other residents who were absent during the pacification, including several children studying in a neighboring town, survived.

Various sources cite different numbers regarding the fatalities of the pacification. Most reports indicate that 67 Poles perished, with the majority—around 58 individuals—being burned alive, while the remainder were shot. However, some conflicting sources suggest the number of victims was 59 or 58 individuals. The identities of 41 victims were confirmed, including ten women and twelve children under 15 years old. The youngest victim was only 2 months old, while the oldest was 61. In some cases, entire families from Szarajówka were wiped out.

Czesław Madajczyk suggests that the atrocity was in retaliation for the village's collaboration with the resistance movement, as well as a reprisal for an earlier assault by Polish partisans on the gendarmes stationed at Tarnogród.

== Aftermath ==
The inhabitants of neighboring villages initially hoped that the people of Szarajówka had been displaced by the Germans. Only after the fire had been extinguished were the charred remains of the victims found among the ashes. The massacre had a loud echo in the region. It was recorded in the reports of the Polish resistance movement, and the Polish underground press also wrote about it.

The remains of the victims were buried in a mass grave, and after the war, a sandstone monument was erected there.

== Bibliography ==
- Fajkowski, Józef (1972). Wieś w ogniu. Eksterminacja wsi polskiej w okresie okupacji hitlerowskiej [A countryside on fire. The extermination of the Polish villages during the Nazi occupation] (in Polish). Warszawa: Ludowa Spółdzielnia Wydawnicza.
- Fajkowski, Józef; Religa, Jan (1981). Zbrodnie hitlerowskie na wsi polskiej 1939–1945 [Nazi crimes in the Polish countryside 1939–1945] (in Polish). Warszawa: Książka i Wiedza.
- Jaczyńska, Agnieszka (2012). Sonderlaboratorium SS. Zamojszczyzna: "pierwszy obszar osiedleńczy" w Generalnym Gubernatorstwie [SS' special laboratory. Zamość region: a "first settlement territory" in the General Government] (in Polish). Lublin: Instytut Pamięci Narodowej – Komisja Ścigania Zbrodni przeciwko Narodowi Polskiemu. Oddział w Lublinie. ISBN 978-83-7629-383-7.
- Madajczyk, Czesław (1965). Hitlerowski terror na wsi polskiej 1939–1945. Zestawienie większych akcji represyjnych [Nazi terror in the Polish countryside 1939–1945. List of major repressive actions] (in Polish). Warszawa: Państwowe Wydawnictwo Naukowe.
- Madajczyk, Czesław, ed. (1979). Zamojszczyzna – Sonderlaboratorium SS. Zbiór dokumentów polskich i niemieckich z okresu okupacji hitlerowskiej [Zamość region - the SS' special laboratory. Collection of Polish and German documents from the period of Nazi occupation] (in Polish). Vol. I&II. Warszawa: Ludowa Spółdzielnia Wydawnicza.
- Mikoda, Janina, ed. (1994). Rejestr miejsc i faktów zbrodni popełnionych przez okupanta hitlerowskiego na ziemiach polskich w latach 1939–1945. Województwo zamojskie [Register of places and facts of crimes committed by the Nazi Occupier on Polish Lands in the years 1939–1945. Zamość Voivodeship] (in Polish). Warszawa: GKBZHwP-IPN. ISBN 83-903356-0-3.
