= Kolonia Kornelówka =

- Village
- Location within Poland
- Coordinates: 50°47′04″N 23°20′57″E
- Country: Poland
- Voivodeship: Lublin
- County: Zamość
- Gmina: Sitno

Kolonia Kornelówka [kɔˈlɔɲa kɔrnɛˈlufka] is a village in the administrative district of Gmina Sitno, within Zamość County, Lublin Voivodeship, in eastern Poland.
