= Massacre in Dynów =

Holocaust massacre by Germans in Poland

- Part of German occupation of Poland and World War II
- Location: Dynów, German-occupied Poland
- Date: September 15, 1939–September 28, 1939; 87 years ago
- Attack type: Mass shooting, death by burning
- Deaths: 170-200
- Perpetrator: Nazi Germany
- Motive: Antisemitism, expansionism

The Dynów massacre was a massacre committed by German Wehrmacht, Gestapo and Einsatzkommando soldiers in Dynów during the German Invasion of Poland in September 1939, on the first day of Jewish New Year (Rosh Hashanah), in which some 170–200 Jewish civilians from the town were murdered.

150 Jews were mass murdered by machine guns after being taken away from the town on trucks. 50 Jews were burned alive in their prayer house.
