= Varnikai =

- Village
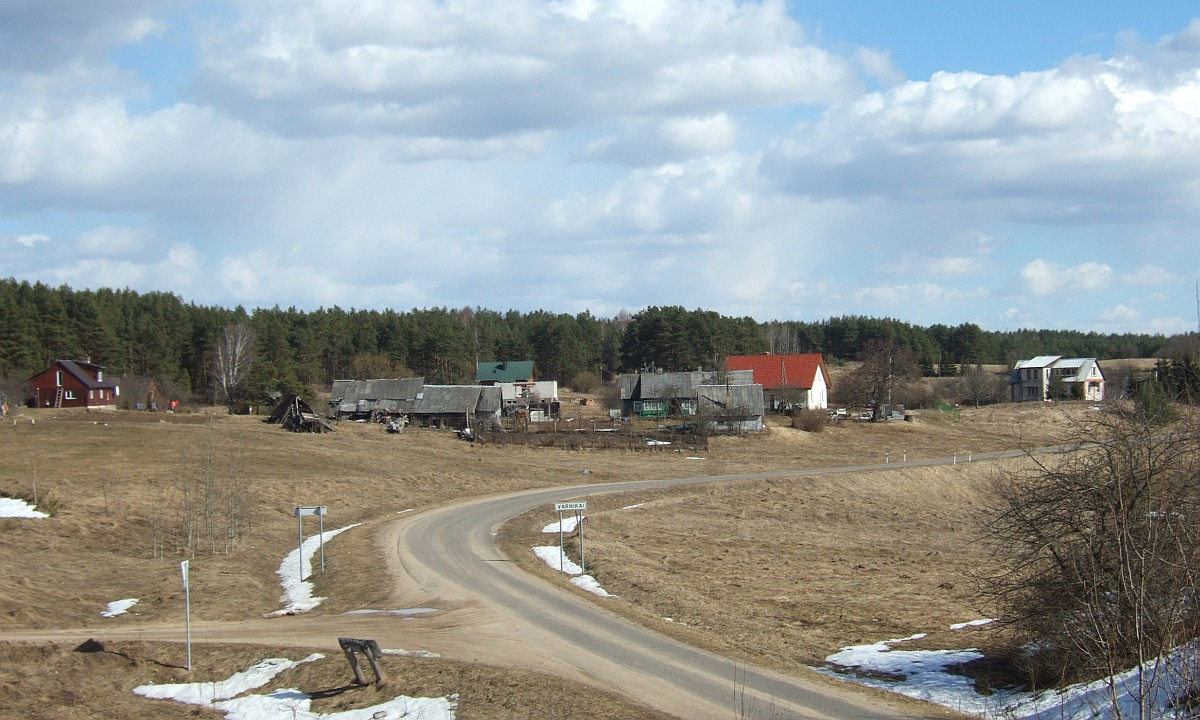
- View of Varnikai

- Location of Varnikai
- Coordinates: 54°38′49″N 24°57′22″E
- Country: Lithuania
- Ethnographic region: Aukštaitija
- County: Vilnius County
- Municipality: Trakai District Municipality
- Eldership: Trakai eldership

Population (2011)
  - Total: 75
- Time zone: UTC+2 (EET)
  - Summer (DST): UTC+3 (EEST)

Varnikai is a small village located in the Trakai District Municipality in Lithuania. The population is 75 inhabitants according to the 2011 census.

== History ==
On September 30, 1941, during World War II, 1,446 Jews (366 men, 483 women and 597 children) were murdered in Varnikai by Lithuanian policemen and white armbanders. The victims were gathered from nearby villages including Trakai. A memorial stone has been erected at the site of the massacre.
