= Zawadka Morochowska massacres =

Killings of Ukrainians and Lemkos

The Zawadka Morochowska massacres were a series of mass killing of ethnic Ukrainians and Lemkos in Poland, perpetrated by units of the communist People's Army of Poland on 25 January, 28 March, and 13 April 1946 in the village of Zawadka Morochowska, during deportation of Ukrainians from Poland to the Soviet Union after the end of World War II.

The number of those killed in the first massacre (January 25) was 56, including women and children. Some of the victims were tortured prior to their death. On March 28 at least eleven men were executed, and on April 13 at least six more men were killed. Around 73 of the remaining inhabitants of the village were deported to the Soviet Union at the end of April, 1946, while 15 final inhabitants were "resettled" within People's Republic of Poland during Operation Vistula in 1947. At that point the village ceased to exist.

== Killings ==
On 23 January 1946, a force of the People's Army of Poland, numbering around 80 soldiers, which was tracking down partisans of the Ukrainian Insurgent Army (UPA) encountered and destroyed small groups of UPA partisans in the area. However, when they tried to enter the village of Zawadka Morochowska they were met with stiffer resistance from the Ukrainian partisans who had withdrawn to the village. As a result, the Polish Communist forces had to retreat. In the process they abandoned two supply wagons as well as several mortars. Additionally, some of the sources related to the massacre emphasize that the casualties suffered by the unit were part of the reason for the killing that took place two days later.

On 25 January, at which point the UPA partisans had left the area, the Polish forces surrounded the village and then proceed to burn it down while murdering from 56 to 78 of its inhabitants, including women and children. There is no evidence that any of the villagers had been part of, or had any connections to the UPA. Records from interwar Poland indicate that the ethnic Ukrainians of the village had friendly contacts with the local Poles and the nearby Polish villages. Some of the victims were tortured before their death.

The unit of the communist Polish army responsible for the massacre was the 34th Regiment of the LWP, commanded by Lieutenant Colonel Stanisław Pluto. According to UPA sources, subsequently some of the Polish soldiers from the 2nd battalion of the 34th regiment were captured by the UPA and gave statements to the effect that the majority of the killings were carried out by the 3rd battalion of the 34th Regiment of the LWP. This information was published in underground Ukrainian pamphlets shortly thereafter.
