= Fidury =

- Village
- Location within Poland
- Coordinates: 52°47′N 21°45′E
- Country: Poland
- Voivodeship: Masovian
- County: Ostrów
- Gmina: Ostrów Mazowiecka
- Time zone: UTC+1 (CET)
  - Summer (DST): UTC+2 (CEST)
- Postal code: 07-300
- Vehicle registration: WOR

Fidury [fiˈdurɨ] is a village in the administrative district of Gmina Ostrów Mazowiecka, within Ostrów County, Masovian Voivodeship, in east-central Poland.

== History ==
During the German occupation of Poland (World War II), on 13 June 1943, Fidury and nearby Koziki were pacified by the German gendarmerie. In Fidury, eight Poles were either stabbed with bayonets, shot or burned alive.
