= Horyszów Polski =

- Village
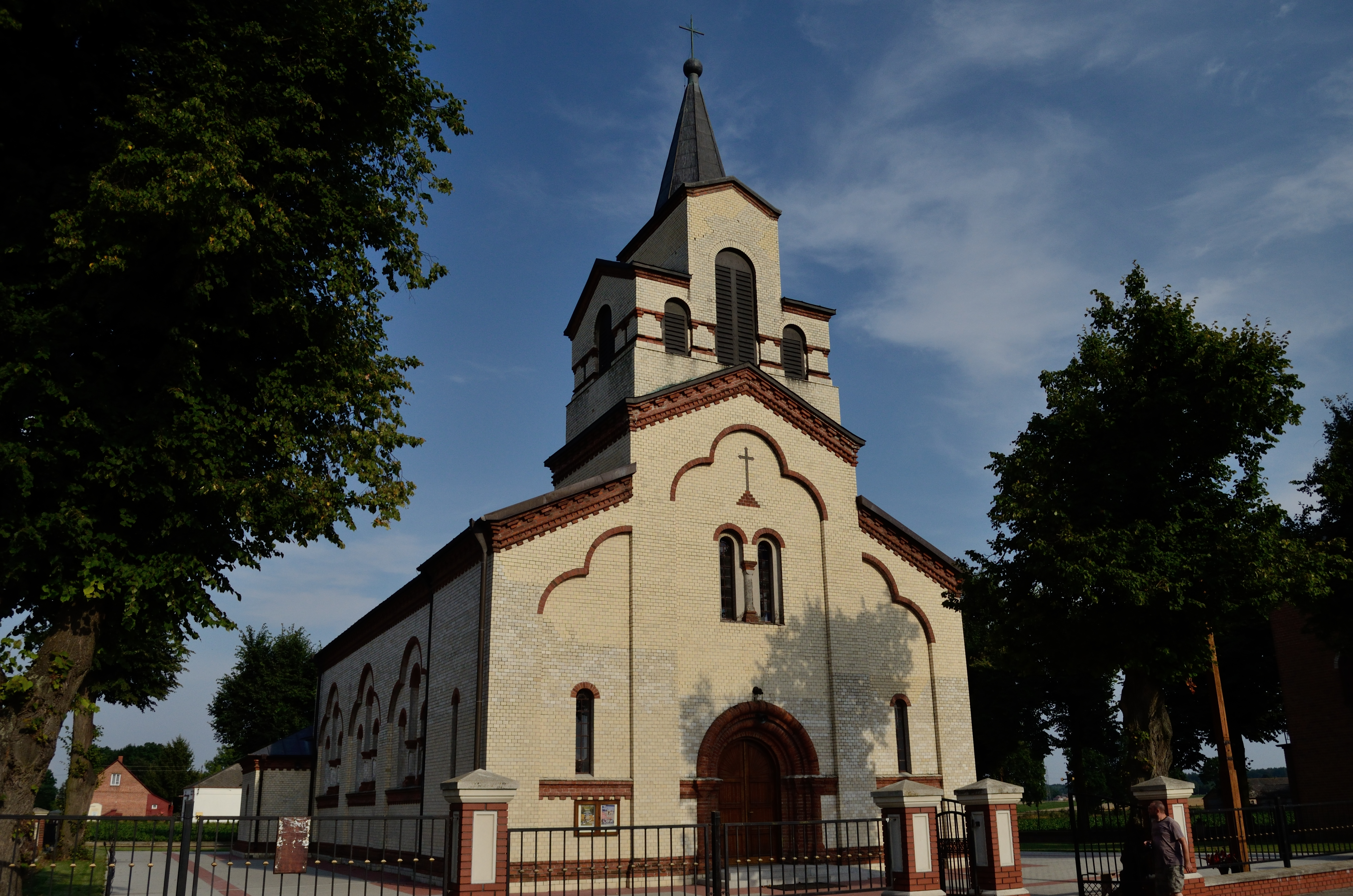
- Exaltation of the Holy Cross church in Horyszów Polski

- Location within Poland
- Coordinates: 50°45′N 23°25′E
- Country: Poland
- Voivodeship: Lublin
- County: Zamość
- Gmina: Sitno
- Time zone: UTC+1 (CET)
  - Summer (DST): UTC+2 (CEST)
- Vehicle registration: LZA

Horyszów Polski [xɔˈrɨʂuf ˈpɔlski] is a village in the administrative district of Gmina Sitno, within Zamość County, Lublin Voivodeship, in eastern Poland.
