= Koziki, Masovian Voivodeship =

Village in Masovian Voivodeship, Poland

Koziki
- Village
- Location within Poland
- Coordinates: 52°47′46″N 21°45′59″E
- Country: Poland
- Voivodeship: Masovian
- County: Ostrów
- Gmina: Ostrów Mazowiecka
- Time zone: UTC+1 (CET)
  - Summer (DST): UTC+2 (CEST)
- Postal code: 07-300
- Vehicle registration: WOR

Koziki [kɔˈʑiki] is a village in the administrative district of Gmina Ostrów Mazowiecka, within Ostrów County, Masovian Voivodeship, in north-eastern Poland. It is located in the historic region of Mazovia.

== History ==
Koziki was a private village of Polish nobility, administratively located in the Ostrów County in the Masovian Voivodeship in the Greater Poland Province of the Kingdom of Poland.

During the German occupation (World War II), on 13 June 1943, Koziki and nearby Fidury were pacified by the German gendarmerie. 13 Poles, including children, were massacred in Koziki, and two farms were plundered and burned down.
