= Jarosławiec, Zamość County =

Jarosławiec
- Village
- Location within Poland
- Coordinates: 50°54′N 23°42′E
- Country: Poland
- Voivodeship: Lublin
- County: Zamość
- Gmina: Sitno
- Population: 1,466

Jarosławiec [jarɔˈswavjɛt͡s] is a village in the administrative district of Gmina Sitno, within Zamość County, Lublin Voivodeship, in eastern Poland.

In 2005 the village had a population of 1,466.
