= Zawadka Morochowska =

- Village
- Location within Poland
- Coordinates: 49°27′59″N 22°11′3″E
- Country: Poland
- Voivodeship: Subcarpathian
- County: Sanok
- Gmina: Komańcza

Zawadka Morochowska [zaˈvatka mɔrɔˈxɔfska] is a former village in the administrative district of Gmina Komańcza, within Sanok County, Subcarpathian Voivodeship, in south-eastern Poland, close to the border with Slovakia.

Zawadka Morochowska (or Bukowska, 1876) appears on records as early as the year 1567. It was a small Rusyn-Wallachian village on either side of the Boroniec stream. The population as of 1936 was 328. In 1939, there were 49 farms. As of January 1945, there were said to be 425 Ukrainians there. The Greek Catholic Church of the Circumcision of Our Lord was built there in 1856. It was a filial church of the church in nearby Morochów, which is much older. The village generally endured through World War II until 1944.

This village was the subject of repression by the Soviet-sponsored Polish Army in early 1946 as part of the campaign to eliminate suspected support for the Ukrainian Insurgent Army (UPA). In January, 1946, a unit of Polish communist soldiers came into the area, and launched offenses against Bukowica, Ratnawica, and Zboiska, among other places. They were searching for an alleged 800 UPA members led by "Ren". They attempted to engage the UPA forces near Zawadka Morochowska, and in the process of the search, massacred dozens of the village's residents including men, women and children. This massacre was followed by at least two additional massacres in March 1946. Residents who remained alive by 1947 were deported to the Western territories that Poland had acquired through the Yalta conference. A memorial to the victims of the Zawadka massacre stands in the cemetery, near the mass graves that hold the victims' bodies.

The parish birth record of Zawadka Morochowska (1784–1890) and the death record of Zawadka Morochowska (1784–1943) are at the Meeting of the Lord Orthodox Church in Morochów. This Orthodox church is in the building once used by the Greek Catholic Church of Morochow.
