= Wnory-Wandy =

- Village
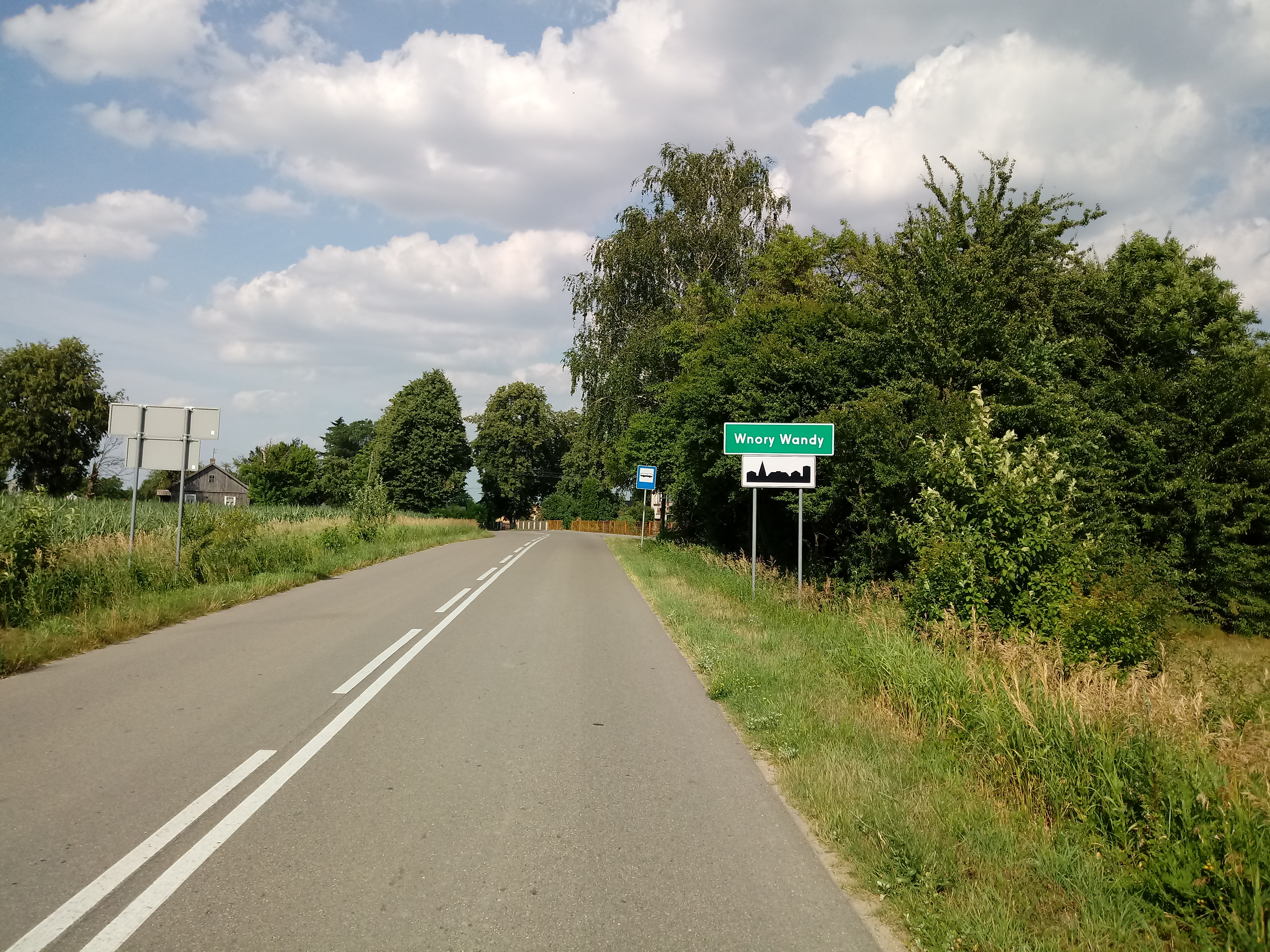

- Location within Poland
- Coordinates: 53°3′N 22°35′E
- Country: Poland
- Voivodeship: Podlaskie
- County: Wysokie Mazowieckie
- Gmina: Kobylin-Borzymy

Population
  - Total: 140
- Time zone: UTC+1 (CET)
  - Summer (DST): UTC+2 (CEST)
- Postal code: 18-204
- Vehicle registration: BWM

Wnory-Wandy [ˈvnɔrɨ ˈvandɨ] is a village in the administrative district of Gmina Kobylin-Borzymy, within Wysokie Mazowieckie County, Podlaskie Voivodeship, in north-eastern Poland.

== History ==
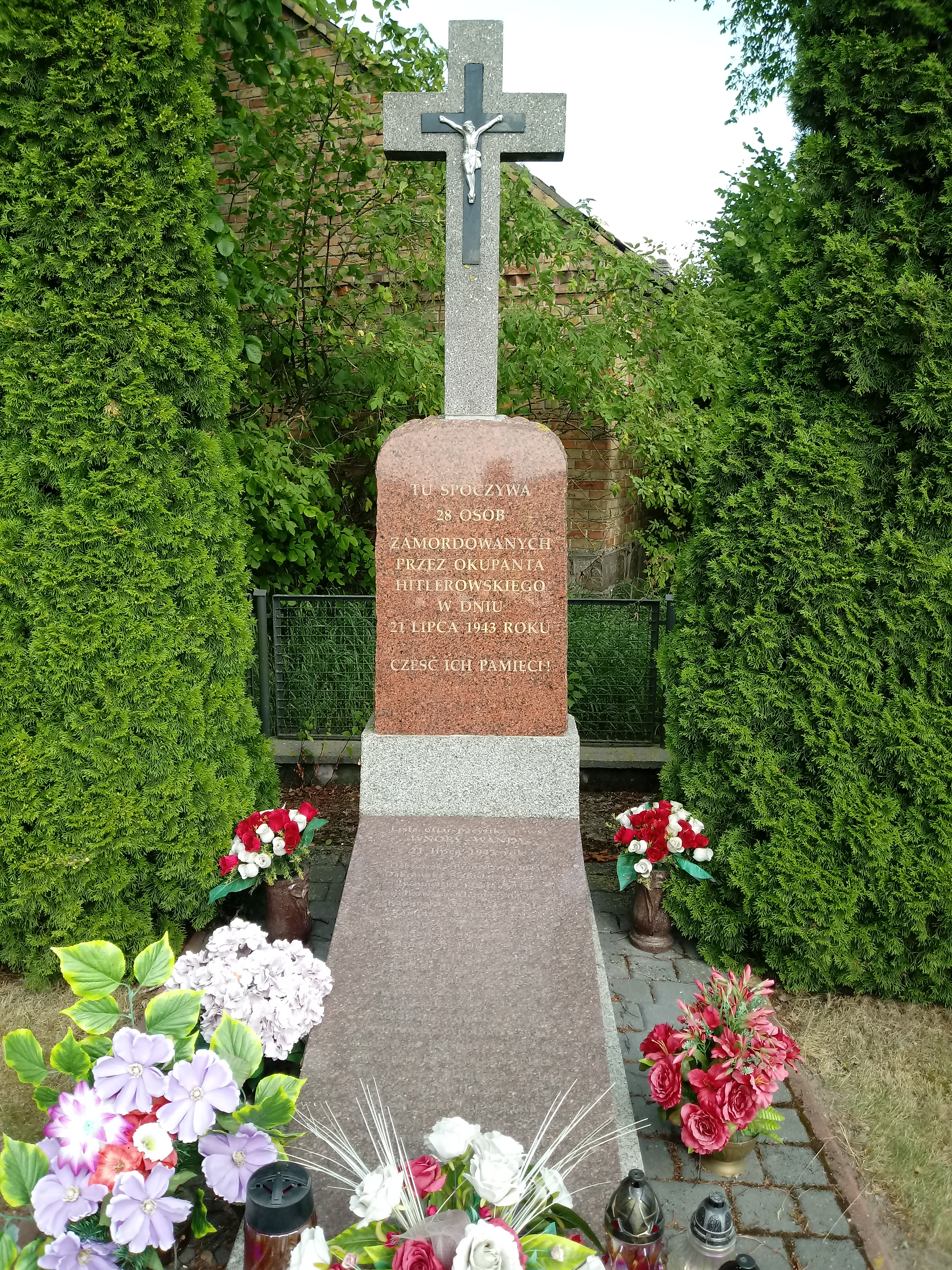
Mass grave of Poles massacred by the Germans in 1943

In 1827, the village had a population of 130.

Following the joint German-Soviet invasion of Poland, which started World War II in September 1939, the village was first occupied by the Soviet Union until 1941, and then by Germany until 1944. On July 21, 1943, in revenge for the activities of the Polish resistance, the Germans pacified the village. About 200 people managed to escape and survive, however, the Germans still massacred 32 Poles.
