= Szarajówka =

- Village
- Location within Poland
- Coordinates: 50°22′13″N 22°50′59″E
- Country: Poland
- Voivodeship: Lublin
- County: Biłgoraj
- Gmina: Łukowa

Population
  - Total: 74

Szarajówka [ʂaraˈjufka] is a village in the administrative district of Gmina Łukowa, within Biłgoraj County, Lublin Voivodeship, in eastern Poland.

== History ==
During the Nazi occupation of Poland, on May 18, 1943, from 58 to 67 inhabitants of Szarajówka, including numerous women and children, were massacred by the German punitive expedition.
