= Chaim Goldberg =

Polish-Israeli-American artist (1917–2004)

Chaim Goldberg חיים גולדוורג
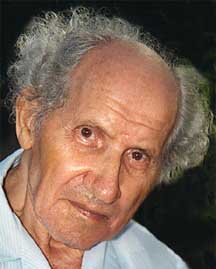
- Chaim Goldberg, circa 1995
- Born: Chaim Goldberg; March 20, 1917; Kazimierz Dolny, Poland
- Died: June 26, 2004 (aged 87); Boca Raton, Florida, United States
- Education: Professor Tadeusz Pruszkowski Academy of Fine Arts in Warsaw, École des Beaux-Arts
- Known for: Painting, sculpture, engraving
- Movement: Post-expressionism, emotivism
- Spouse: Rachel Goldberg
- Children: Victor Goldberg, Shalom Goldberg
- Website: chaimgoldberg.com

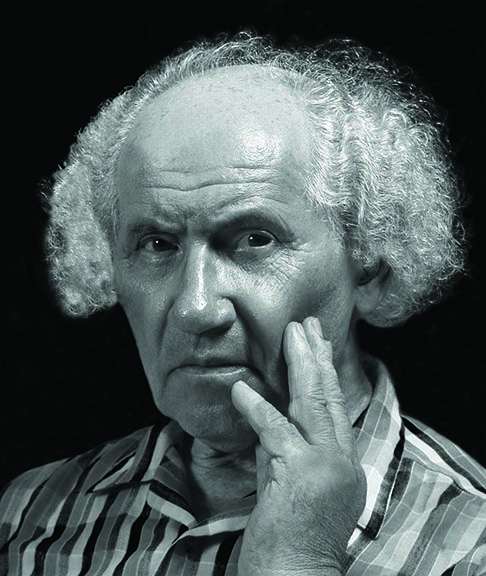
Goldberg. circa 1995. He could still hear the sounds of his village, the picturesque Kazimierz Dolny in SE Poland by the Vistula river.

Chaim Goldberg (Hebrew: חיים גולדוורג; March 20, 1917 – June 26, 2004) was a Polish-Israeli-American artist, painter, sculptor, and engraver. He is known for being a chronicler of Jewish life in the eastern European Polish villages (or shtetlekh) like the one in his native Kazimierz Dolny in south-eastern Poland. He witnessed the colorful life and began to draw what he saw. The recurring art colony atmosphere became the highpoint of his self-actualization dreams, as he envisioned himself becoming an artist like those who visited the village. He yearned to experience life as they did for himself and later undertook the mission of being a leading painter of Holocaust-era art, which to the artist was seen as an obligation and art with a sense of profound mission.

Following World War II he emigrated to Israel and in 1967 to the United States. He and his family became US citizens in 1973. He died in Boca Raton, Florida, in 2004.

== Early life ==
Goldberg was born in a wooden clapboard house built by his father, a village cobbler. The house stood on Błotna Street as it was called at the time, due to the fact that the creek would overflow and the road turned to a muddy area. As a young boy of 6 he gravitated to creating little figurines carved from stones which he gave away to his friends. Later he took up drawing and painting with basic shoemaker paints that he found at his father's workbench. He was the ninth child and the first boy after eight girls. He grew up in a religious home in Kazimierz Dolny. He would observe and draw the beggars and klezmers who frequented his home as guests. His father would encourage their stays by letting it be known that the humble Goldberg home was open for those who could not pay for their night stay at any of the inns. They were surely welcome there. These characters became Goldberg's early models.

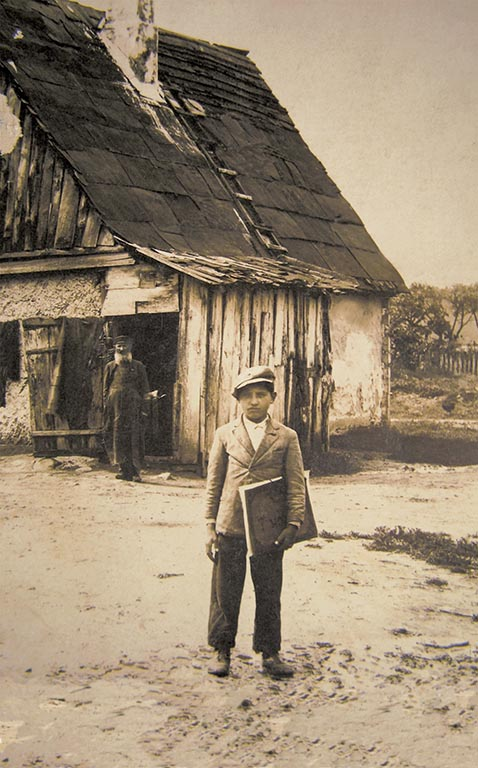
Circa 1931, in front of his home before going to the Mehoffer Art Academy on a full scholarship.

== Discovery and First Shtetl Period ==
Goldberg, the youngest student to be accepted in 1934, with the student body accepted to the academy that year. (Goldberg is standing to the left of the professor, holding a bottle of wine)

On a crisp day in the fall of 1931, Dr. Saul Silberstein, a student of Sigmund Freud who was doing post-doctorate work on his book, Jewish Village Mannerisms came into the Goldberg cobbler workshop to have his shoes repaired. As he waited for the repair, he noticed the numerous artworks that were attached to the wall with shoe nails and inquired who the artist was.

Silberstein spent the entire night reviewing the young artist's work. In the morning, they went by foot to Lublin, a distance of 26 miles, and Dr. Silberstein obtained the opinions of several respected individuals of Goldberg's work. He then got him several small scholarships based on these letters of recommendation. This helped finance his early education at the "Józef Mehoffer School for Fine Arts", in Kraków, from which he graduated in 1934.

Dr. Silberstein was able to interest several other wealthy sponsors, such as the honorable Felix Kronstein, a judge, and a newspaper publisher who supported the artist through his graduation from the Academy of Fine Arts in Warsaw. At 17, he was the youngest to be admitted and studied under the Rector of the academy and Professor Tadeusz Pruszkowski, Kowarski, Władysław Skoczylas and Jan Gotard.

The beauty of Kazimierz Dolny had long ago been discovered by artists who had flocked there in large numbers over the years. Between the First World War and the Second World War, Kazimierz Dolny became known as an Art Colony as well. Prof. Tadeusz Pruszkowski had built a summer studio in the mountains and encouraged his students to come down and paint outdoors. Many of these artists as well as older ones painted the life they saw and the landscape. Goldberg became stimulated by this interaction with the artists and despite being totally unschooled in that craft. He studied the actions of the artists and they encouraged him to become involved. He set himself up with a home-made easel, and painted outdoors. When he was discovered at the age of 14, his collection included landscapes and paintings of the vagabonds that frequented his home as guests.

== The War Years 1939–1945 ==
The Dismantling. Oil on canvas 40" x 60" (1991)

Goldberg was conscripted into the Polish army in the fall of 1938. He was assigned to the artillery brigade that guarded Warsaw. After the Polish army surrendered to the Germans, he became a POW, held in a labor camp. He would escape but was unsuccessful in the attempts to convince his parents and family of the plans of the Germans about treating Jews badly.

Goldberg, his future wife, his wife's sister, and their parents escaped by foot to Russia moving north as the Germans advanced, settling in Novosibirsk. Goldberg married Rachel on April 15, 1944. They would to return to Poland in 1946.

== Paris Fellowship and Emigration to Israel ==
Goldberg received a fellowship from the Polish Ministry of Culture to study at the Ecole de Beaux Arts in Paris, and in 1949 they returned to Poland. He worked on various commissions for the Polish Government and, in 1955, made an application to be allowed to immigrate to Israel. Poland was awash with a new Communist regime and Social Realism – that Goldberg found to be distasteful. The regime frowned on depictions of "Jewish Life" in Post-War art which drove a final rift between the artist and his intent to help rebuild the destroyed Poland. Instead, his wife Rachel and his two sons, Victor and Shalom, left Poland for Israel.

The Goldberg family arrived in Israel in 1955. They stayed in Israel until 1967. Goldberg exhibited, and Rachel sold his work to American, and Canadian tourists, and Israeli collectors. Despite that Safed (Upper Galilee) was the art colony of record; Goldberg's studio became a destination in northern Tel Aviv for tourists especially the wealthy who frequented Hotel Ramat Aviv.

== Discovering Modernism ==
Pervasive in his watercolors, one can see the ‘stained glass’ look that he developed in 1963. He added in the studio the black lines to the color areas as a final step.

This developed by accident: His son, Shalom, recalls accompanying his father on a painting trip to Tiberias. "He began his outdoor painting session by making his preliminary pencil composition and then splashed the watercolors on the sheet, brushing the color once and orienting it by the areas he sketched out, however, the session was cut short by a sudden rainstorm." Goldberg and his son packed up and returned to the studio with the drying watercolors, being held horizontally, still taped to his boards, and he set them aside on a countertop he had in the studio. "The next morning," his son recalls, "he unpacked a purchase of black magic markers and sat down to try them out on the newly coated watercolors. To his surprise, the black lines became a look he welcomed and which he began to apply to most of his work with water-based paints. Beginning with this accidental interruption, he evolved, progressing quickly, a unique style that found its way into all his other themes, even his abstract work."

== Second Shtetl Period ==
Once ensconced in his large studio, Goldberg began to create large paintings that depicted Jewish life he recalled in his Shtetl of Kazimierz Dolny. During this period, of 1960–1966, he created some of his best-known paintings, such as The Wedding (in the collection of the Spertus Museum, Chicago); The Shtetl (in the collection of the Metropolitan Museum of Art, NY); Simchat Torah (in a private collection, NY); and Don't Forget.

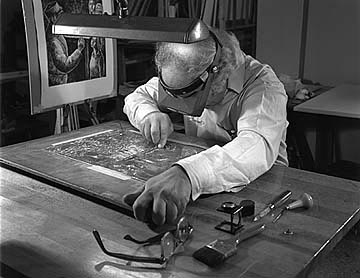
Goldberg creating a hand-engraved image on a copper plate.

== Sculptures ==
Goldberg's insatiable desire to create art in many mediums knew no end. He engraved and sculpted in wood, stone, and metal. Here we see a 9 1/2-foot-tall carving from oak, titled WE. He would stain his sculptures in various tones and have editions of 8 bronzes cast of each one he chose for editioning. His main advisor was his wife of 65 years, Rachel.

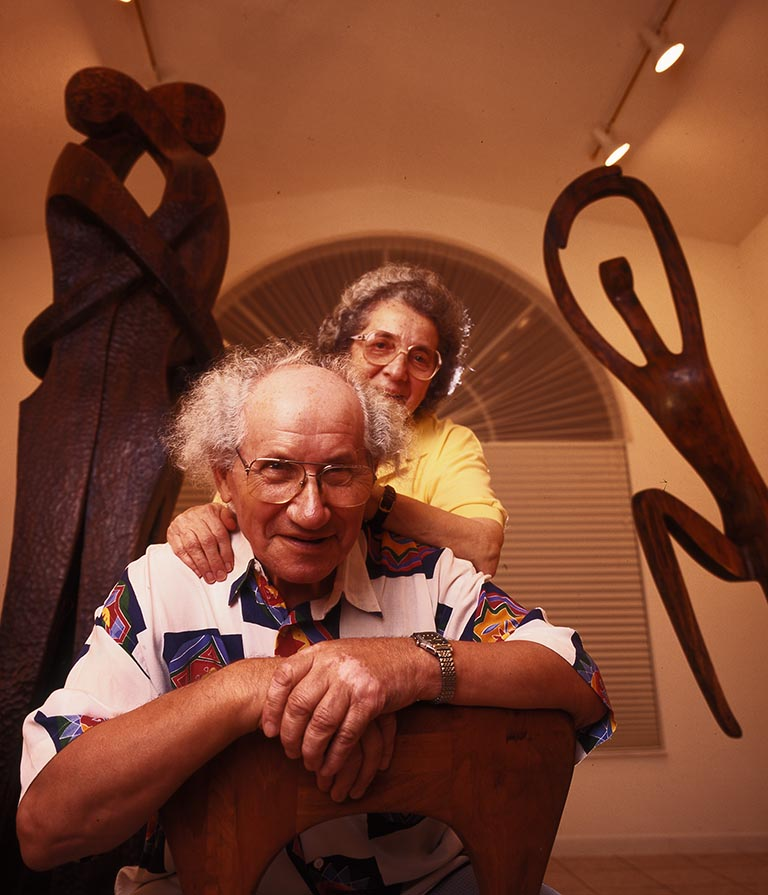
Goldberg and his wife Rachel of 65 years in their home in Boca Raton, Florida, in 1995.

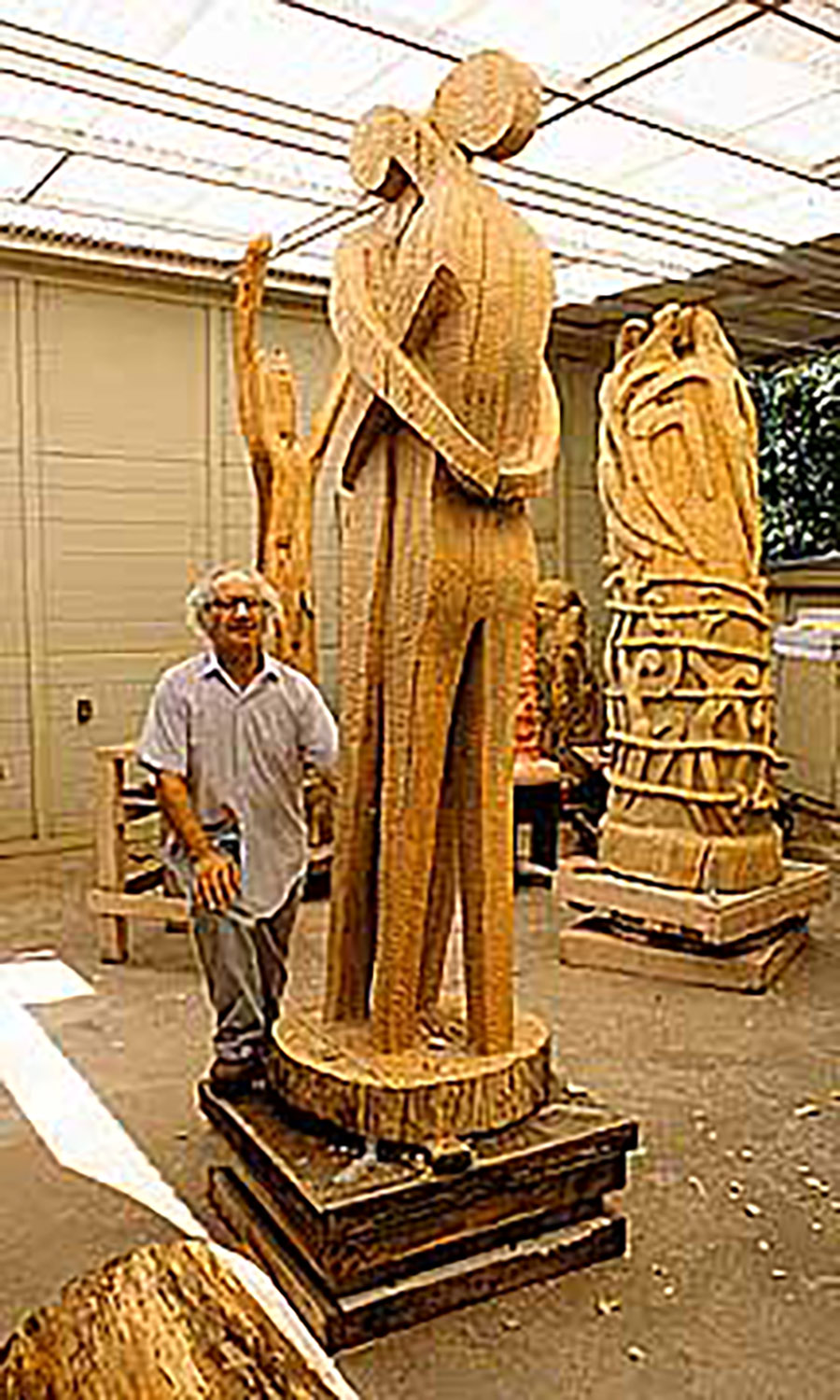
Goldberg, 1982 in his Houston, Texas, sculpture workshop. A few large carvings are seen in the process.

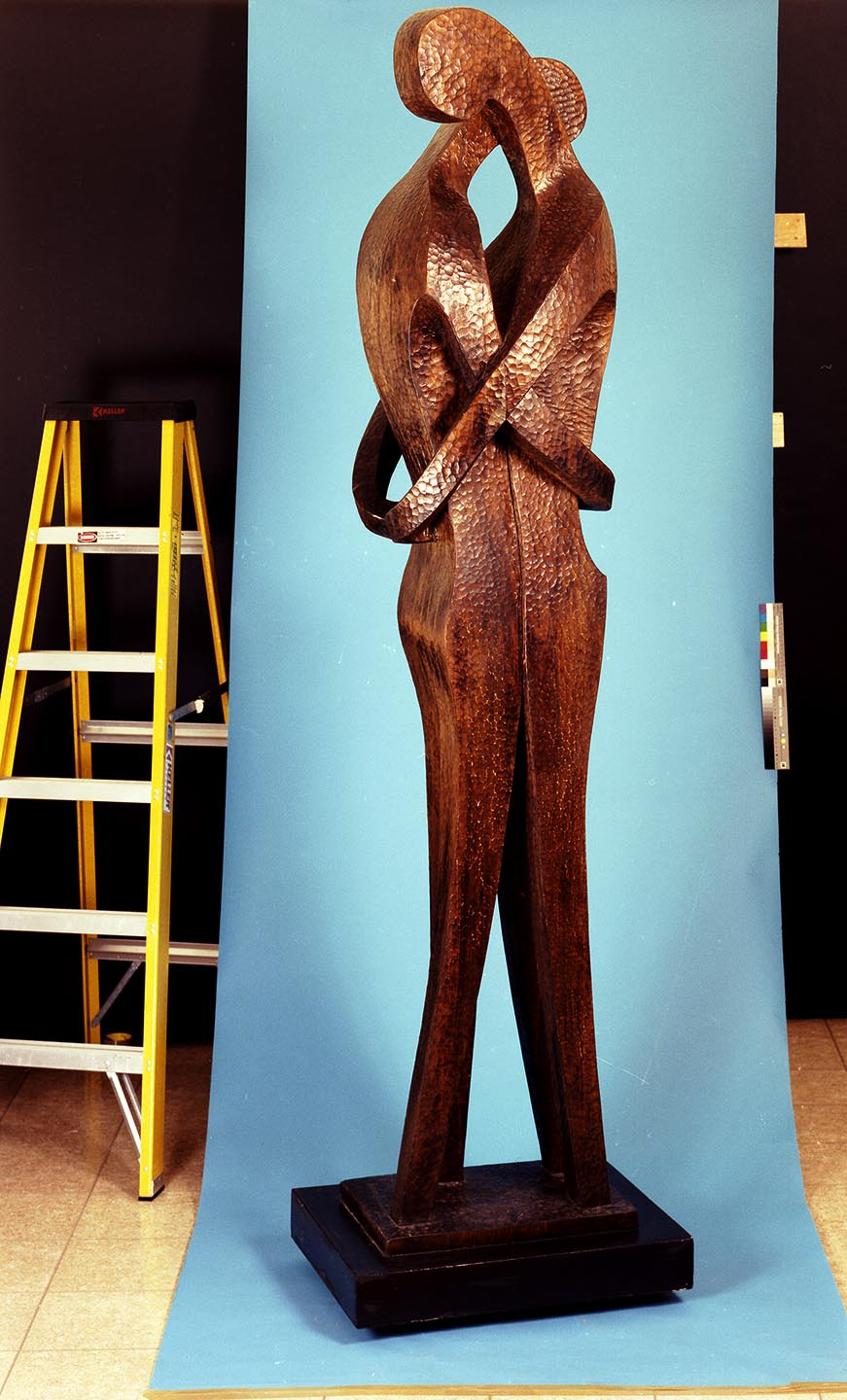
WE, a 9 1/2 foot carving in Texas Oak

=== The United States ===
In 1967, Goldberg arrived in the United States, with a two-year business visa on an exhibition tour and continued to paint, and create line engravings of his village characters, as well as sculpt. His subject matter widened while living in New York, which became one of his "themes." He and his family decided to become citizens of the United States in 1973.

== Influences ==
Goldberg's "Culture Shock" series and other series based on real life and politics of the period were the works of the series "Mad Drivers." Some of his work dealt with his own dream sequences, such as the "Violin Thief Sequence" and the "Bird Dream Sequence."

In 1974, Goldberg attended a performance of Emmett Kelly, Jr.'s circus and began a series of drawings and other works on paper inspired by the circus theme. Then dance took center stage as his main subject. He also carved in wood. His body of work on the dance theme included paintings, watercolors, and sculptures carved in wood or made of aggregate concrete. Goldberg continued line engraving and created a suite of 6 engravings titled, "Spring."

In videotaped interviews with the artist's son, Shalom, it becomes clear that Goldberg's career took two parallel paths of creation by virtue of his ability to compartmentalize his time and to the success of his Judaic theme to support him and his family throughout his life.

DANCE Line engravings by Chaim Goldberg
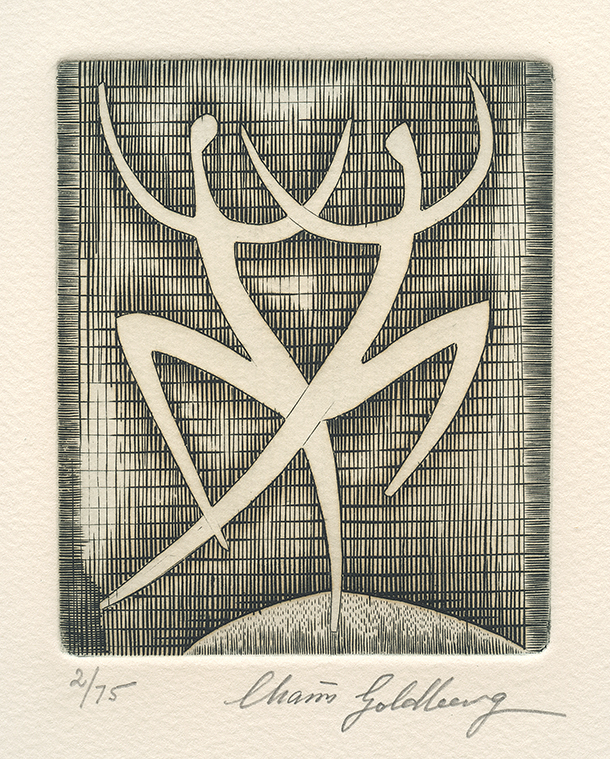
Spring 1

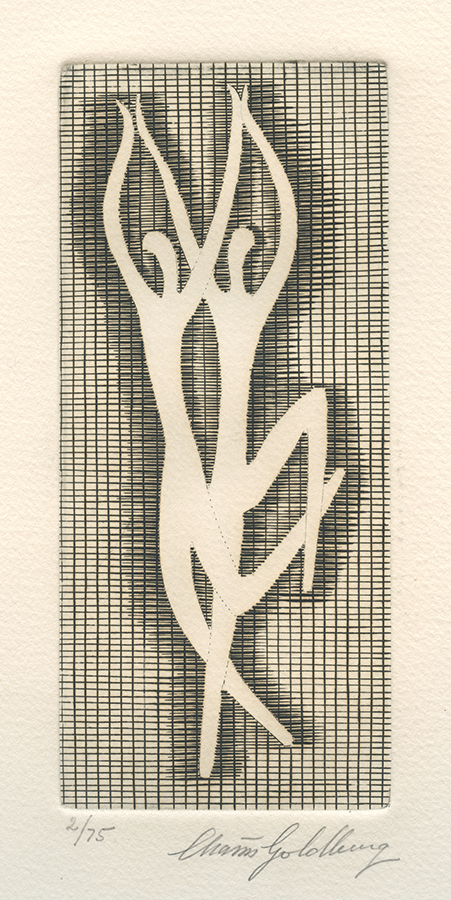
Spring 2

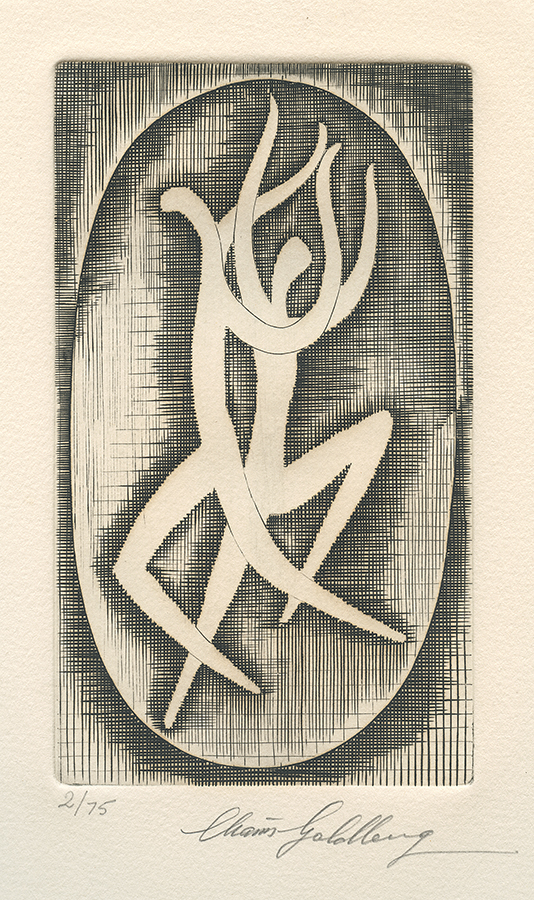
Spring 3

== The Dance Theme ==
In 1970 the famous Yiddish Stage Dancer and friend of the artist, Felix Fibich, posed for Goldberg by striking dance positions on a low-standing coffee table in the artist's living room. Goldberg quickly executed numerous pencil drawings while his son, Shalom made BW photographs that he later developed in his darkroom. This reference material gave rise to Goldberg's Dance art work. He made watercolors and oil paintings. When the artist moved to Houston, he began to sculpt dance figures by carving them directly into wood, these were later cast into bronze and issued as small editions of eight. The carvings and his bronzes became very desired and trendy.

== The Holocaust Theme ==
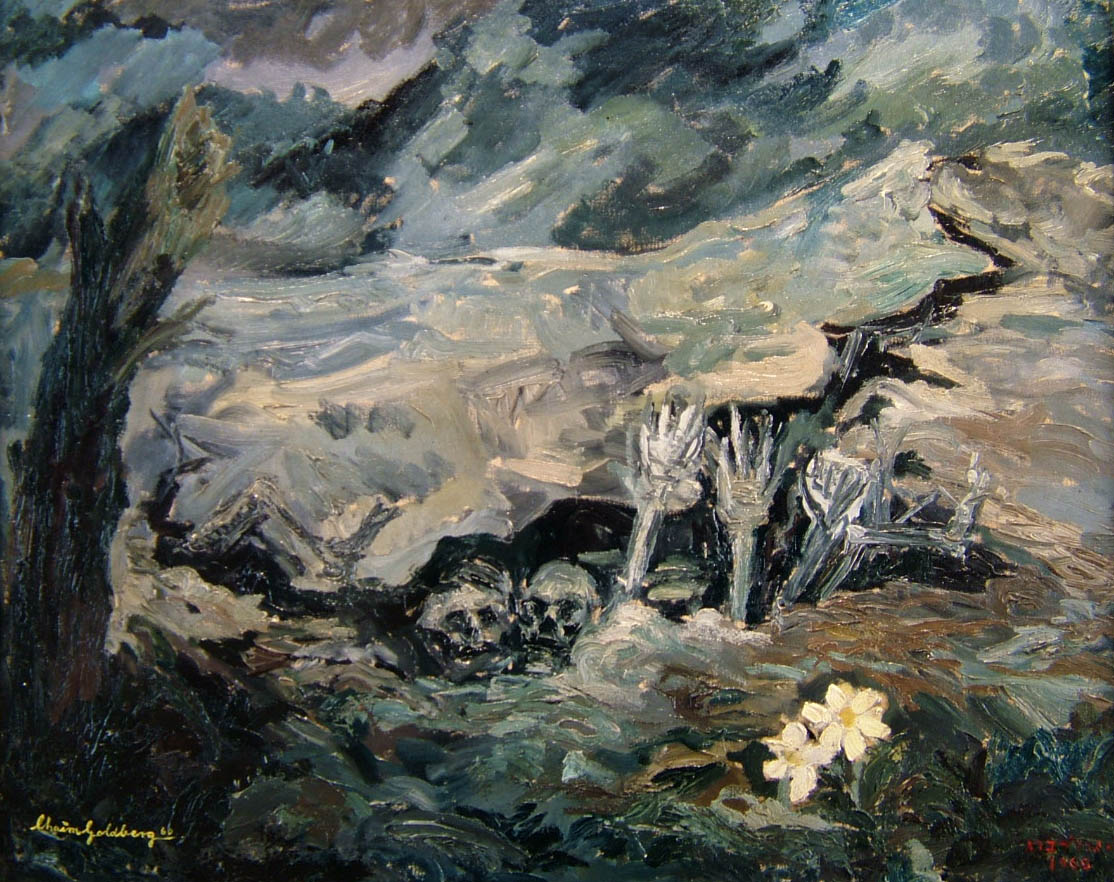
Babi-Yar. Oil on canvas, collection of the Spertus Institute for Jewish Learning and Leadership, Chicago, Illinois.

In 1942 while in exile in Russia, Goldberg began making an effort to document what he heard. He returned to Poland with his wife and son, Victor, and began to create over 150 works of art dealing with the Holocaust, many of which are in the permanent collection of several museums, namely the Spertus Institute for Jewish Learning and Leadership in Chicago.

== The Four Shtetl Periods ==
The artist's creative history can be divided into several phases and themes to better understand his push-pull forces. The chart below documents Goldberg's concurrent themes and thus his push-pull between creating more art for his mission to make Shtetl Life eternalized and his actual need for a Post-War series of themes and methodologies of creating art; all proving that his brand is a more balanced one rather that and intended one for commercialization.

== Working on Several Themes Concurrently ==
Goldberg trained himself in compartmentalizing his various themes by using different areas of his studio at different times of the day. He would go to his painting studio to paint based on a stream of creative time, and then have lunch with his wife, Rachel. After lunch, he would walk into his engraving area and, once seated, was able to forget his other drives or interests and stay focused on engraving, proofing, and so on. This time management system enabled him to work on various themes and mediums concurrently. However, when it came to his painting of the Holocaust theme, he had to "cleanse his head," as he referred to it. It became a well-known fact that he could create watercolors, or paint the Dance theme, for example, during one part of the day and then move on to painting his Shtetl Life recollections. Disciplined and talented, these ran as a dichotomy with Goldberg, a man gifted in numerous media requiring different disciplines.

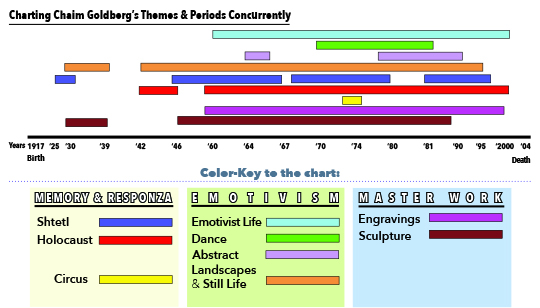

== Emotivism-based Contemporary Expression ==
Alongside his paintings of Shtetl life, Goldberg developed a distinct body of pen-and-ink drawings beginning around 1970, a period of work that continued through the 1980s. These drawings have been described as expressive and emotionally charged. The artist figure surrounded by large groups of distorted or troubled figures, conveying themes of isolation, anxiety, and social tension. Other works portray the figure as an observer or participant in scenes of violence, moral conflict, or anonymous gatherings. Art historians have interpreted the series as a visual response to the social and cultural changes of the period, with the drawings serving as a form of personal reflection or visual journal.

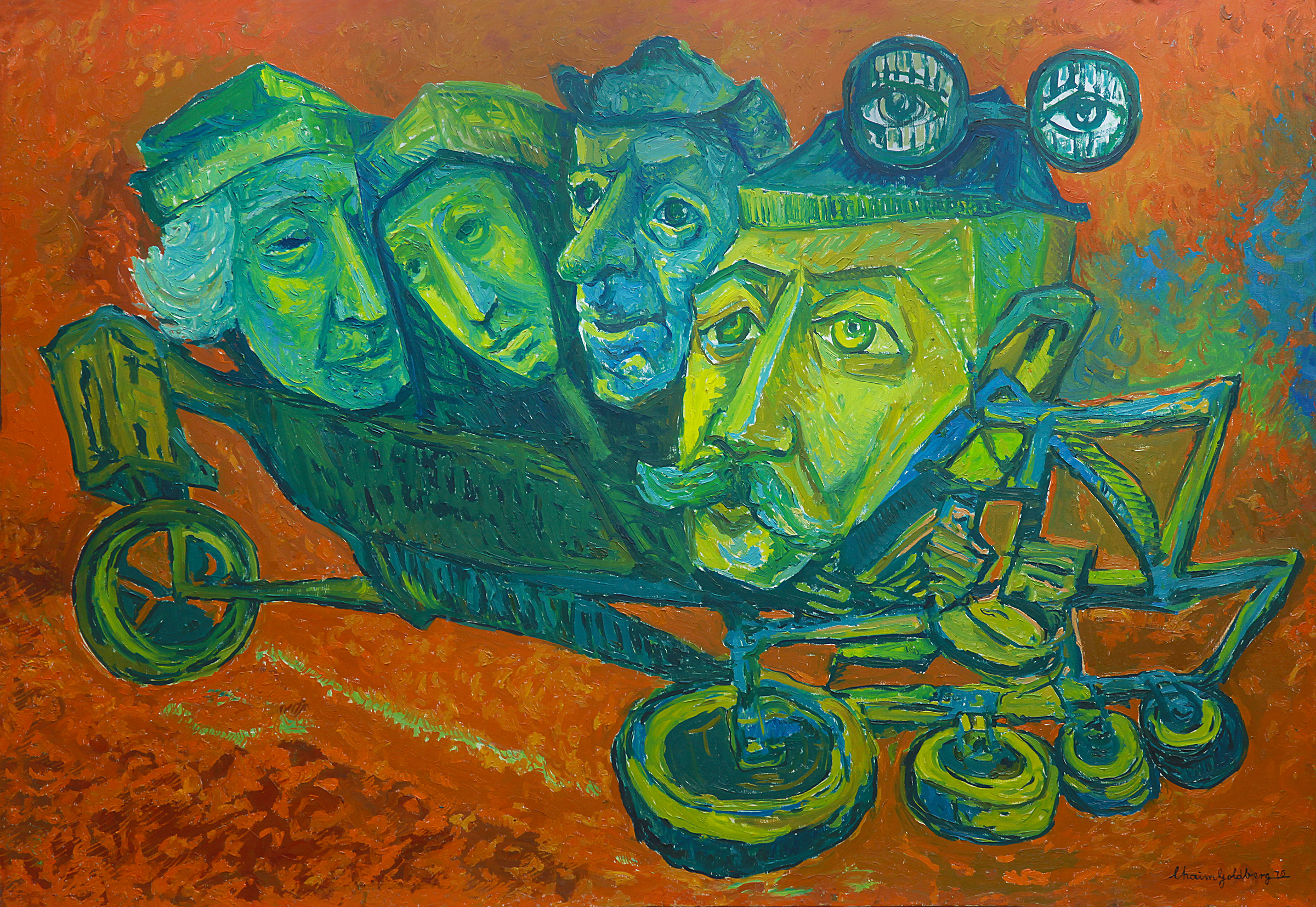
Broken Wheels, Oil on panel, 1975

Art with an Emotivism-based focus or perspective has appeared in the works of such artists as Willem de Kooning, Francis Bacon, Lucian Freud, Maryan Maryan (a Holocaust survivor), and numerous others who had their own pains to express as well. Even Pablo Picasso, in some of his work, could be considered to have contributed to this wave. In Francis Bacon's work and a few others, the artists expressed their pains, while their works were mislabeled as Neo-Expressive, a polite or ‘PC’ correct way of saying “a gay artist.” If one takes the time to comprehend the narrative in these paintings accurately and leaves much to the viewer's subjective interpretation, the emotive content becomes empowered. However, the paintings may not contain clearly defined statements that would label them as works of an Emotivist type.

Using this new modern way of expression, he was able to channel his pains stemming from the acts of extermination beyond his earlier preoccupation with making an art memorial to his village characters. Now, he channeled numerous references that took shape as descending monsters, nightmares, and dreams of loss, feeling as if a descending monster bird ripped his head out of his body and flew off with it. In some of his other works, a violin is stolen while the artist sleeps under a tree.

His oil paintings and pastels surge beyond the original drawings, and in 1975, he began painting a series of oil paintings expressing the different masks humans assume, or "wear" throughout various interactions, and at various times and wear to conceal their true intentions and feeling, deceptively clinging to a game of gaining their agenda. We see numerous acrylic and oil paintings on wood panels whose narrative is intertwined and a puzzle to uncover. Goldberg's masks and street violence paintings reveal a mind that Could leap from his mission to respond to modernity and its various convoluted aspects.

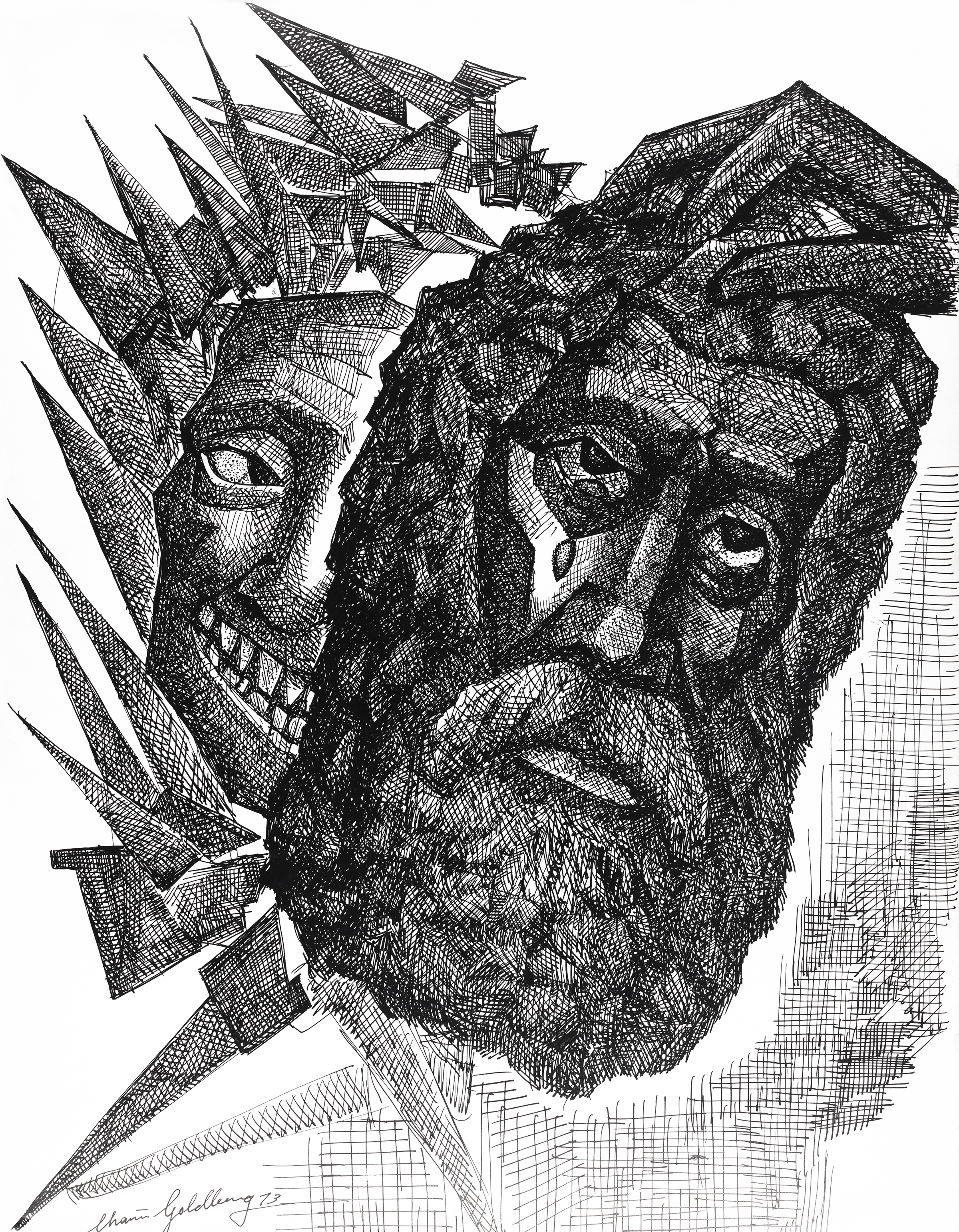

In 1973 he created a series of mask pen-and-inks depicting a monster regime, (Communism) that wore deceptive masks. Clearly, there is a modern narrative in his creations that demands further study and analysis by art historians.

Other works in this group are Crazy Drivers and The Modern City.

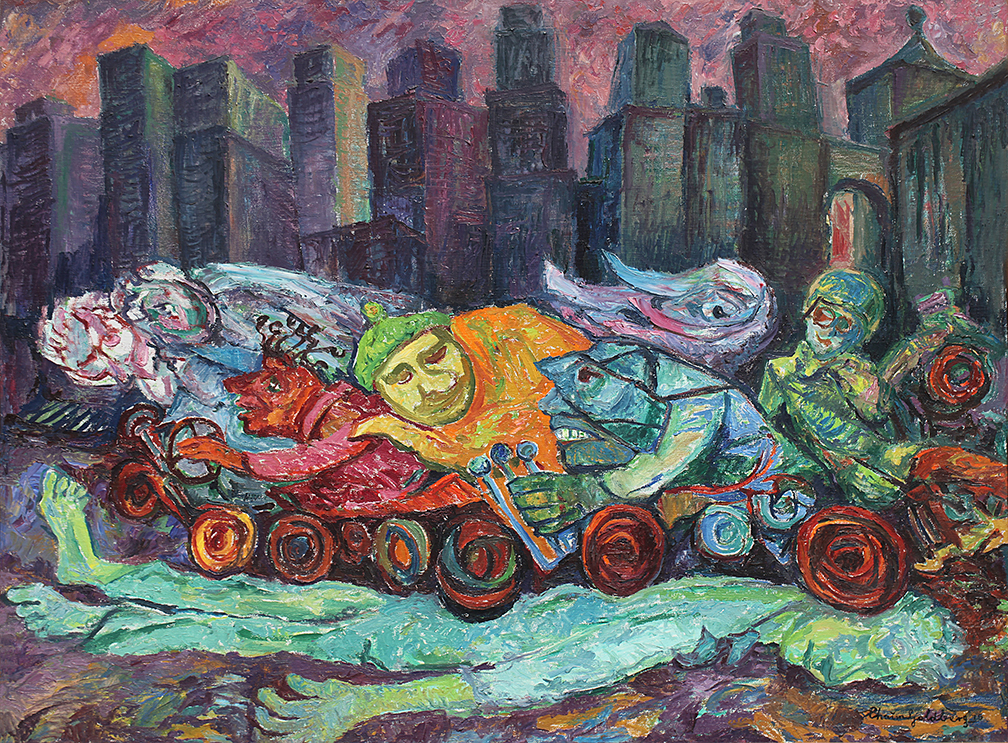
Crazy Drivers #3

In his Pipelines oil painting, the artist imagines a tube-like channel, like a pipeline that zips the population in and out of the city. This painting and many others in this group were conceived and painted in the early 70s; over fifty years before Elon Musk and his Boring Company.

== Creating Dance and Abstract as "cleansing forces" from Painting the Depressing Holocaust ==
Goldberg was a modernist artist who created a memorial to the life of the shtetl. He also created other themes. He experimented with this as a "cleansing," as he called it, starting in Israel as early as 1964. He also returned to the world of abstract expressionism and concurrently created sculptures and engravings. He carved out of wood, and chiseled them out of white and pink marble. His sculptures are in a vast range of materials.

== Major Early Exhibitions ==
In 1971, barely 4 years since his arrival from Israel, the Catholic college in Queens, New York, St. John's University, hosted an exhibit at their DeAndries Exhibit Hall. Goldberg's major canvas, The Shtetl, which he painted in 1962, was selected by the director of the Metropolitan Museum of Art, Mr. Thomas Hoving, an attending guest at the opening, to be included in the MET's 20th Century Permanent Art Collection – A major achievement and recognition for a foreign-born artist who was not a citizen at the time.

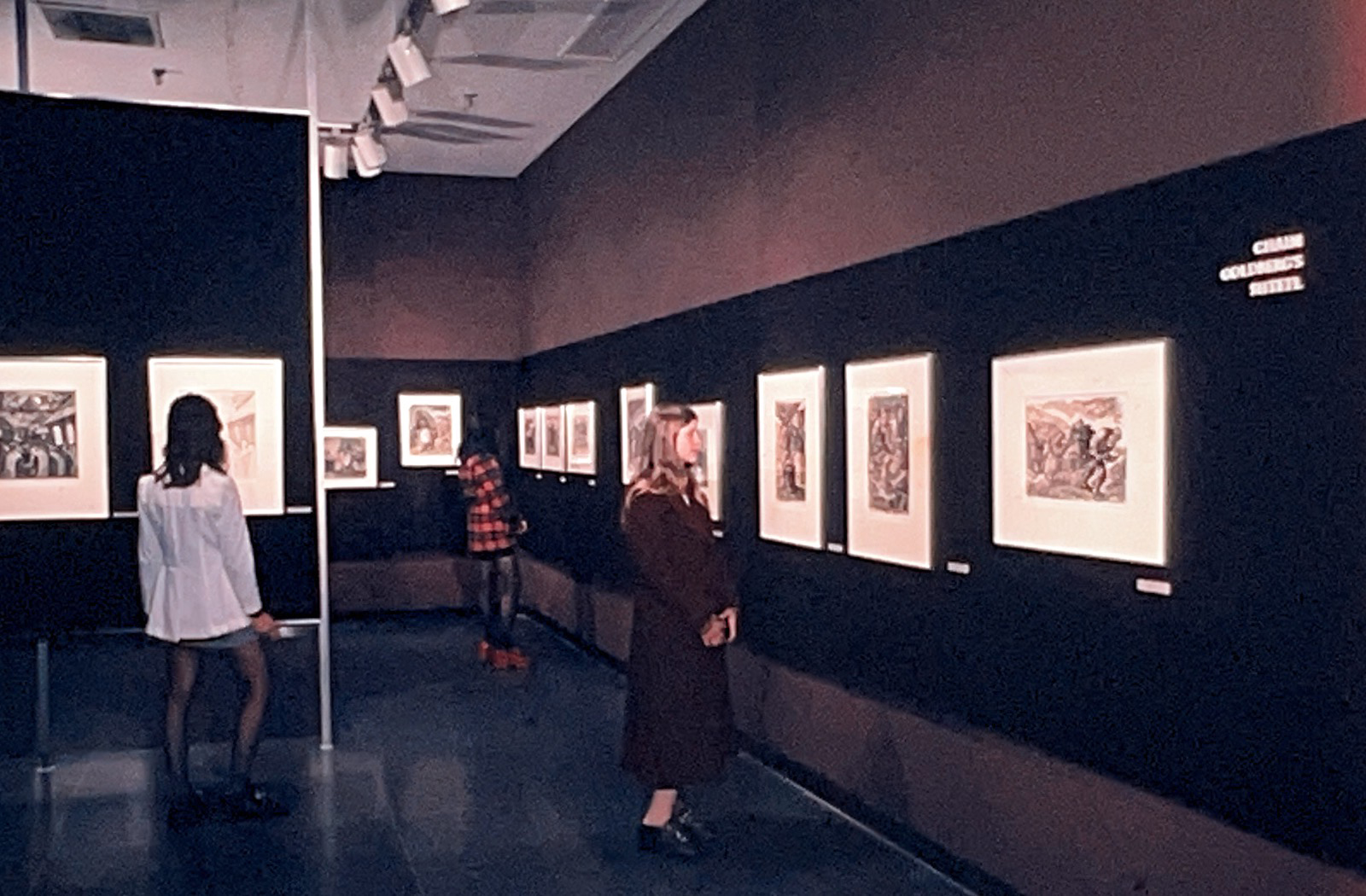
Goldberg's Shtetl Exhibit at the Smithsonian's, Hall of Graphic Arts, April – 1973

In 1973, still not an American citizen, Goldberg was invited to exhibit his engravings, drawings, watercolors and oil paintings at the Smithsonian Institution's Hall of Graphic Arts, recognizing his exceptional engraving talents and the works he created in the short time period of five years since landing on the American shores. Goldberg and his family were finally made American citizens.

In 1997, Goldberg's work went on exhibit at the Rosen Museum of Art, Boca Raton, (on the campus of the JCC).

== Recent Major Exhibitions ==
In 2013 the Nadwishlanski Museum in Kazimierz Dolny, Poland, celebrated its Jubilee and the opening of a major museum building with a One Man Show of their own town's now-famous artist – Goldberg. The exhibit opened on December 9, 2013, and closed on August 30, 2014.

In 2016 – The artist's Shtetl Life work was exhibited at 'Museum, I Remember' in Krakow, Poland, from March 20 to July 26, 2016.

In 2016 – The third leg of exhibits in Poland, the exhibit now titled, I Remember the Shtetl opened at the Krakow Palace of Art on September 15 and closed on November 20, 2016.

== Final Years ==
In 1987, while working on the modernist themes above, Goldberg returned to painting his beloved Kazimierz Dolny and the Jewish life in the village. This time his paintings were less lyrical and surreal, and instead were more 'story-telling' and documentary. After completing some fifty large canvases in 1997, at the age of 80, he was diagnosed with a disabling illness. He died on June 26, 2004, in Boca Raton, Florida, aged 87.

== Exhibitions ==
- 1931 – "Polish Landscapes," Group Show, Kazimierz-Dolny, Poland
- 1934 – Studio Show, Kazmierz-Dolny, Poland
- 1936 – National Group Show, Warsaw, Poland
- 1937 – National Group Show, Warsaw, Poland (the artist, his future wife and her family were refugees in Siberia)
- 1946 – "Poland After World War II" solo show, Shtczechin, Poland
- 1947 – National Group Show, Warsaw, Poland
- 1949 – National Group Show, Warsaw, Poland
- 1950 – National Group Show, Warsaw, Poland
- 1951 – National Group Show, Warsaw, Poland
- 1952 – National Group Show, Warsaw, Poland
- 1965 – One Man Show, Pioneer House, Giv'atayim, Israel
- 1966 – Retrospective Show, Museum Yad Labanim, Petach Tikvah, Israel (attended by Mrs. Golda Meir – Prime Minister; and Kadish Luz – Speaker of the House (Knesset)
- 1967 – One Man Show, LYS Gallery, New York
- 1968 – One Man Show, Theodor Hertzl Institute, New York City, New York
- 1968 – One Man Show, Mixed Media Art Center, Syracuse, New York
- 1969 – One Man Show, Paul Kessler Art Gallery, Provincetown, Massachusetts
- 1970 – One Man Show, Paul Kessler Art Gallery, Provincetown, Massachusetts
- 1971 – Large Retrospective Exhibit at the DeAndries Gallery, St' John's University, Queens, New York
- 1972 – One Man Show, Mixed Media, Lincoln Mall Art Center, Miami, Florida
- 1972 – Group Show, Mixed Media, American Congress, Washington, D.C.
- 1973 – One Man Show, "Chaim Goldberg's Shtetl" (drawings, watercolors, sculptures, oil paintings and line engravings) Smithsonian Institution, Hall of Graphic Arts, Washington, D. C.
- 1973 – Group Exhibit, "Jewish Motifs and Culture of the 20th Century," Klingspor Museum, Offenbach, Germany
- 1974 – One Man Show, The Avila Art Center, Jewish Synagogue, Caracas, Venezuela
- 1977 – Group Show with the Texas Society of Sculptors, Houston Public Library, Main Branch, Houston, Texas
- 1979 – One Man Show, Museum of Printing History, Houston, Texas
- 1982 – Group Exhibit, "Art of the Twentieth Century – A Revelation," Congregation Beth Israel, Houston, Texas
- 1985 – Group Exhibit, "Twenty-Sixth Invitational," Longview Museum of Art, Longview, Texas
- 1994 – Group Exhibit, "Shtetl Life," the Nathan and Faye Hurvitz Collection, the Magnes Collection of Jewish Art and Life, Berkeley, California Goldberg's "Marketplace", a hand-colored litho was on the cover of the exhibit catalog.
- 1997 – One Man Exhibit, "Chaim Goldberg at 80," Nathan B. Rosen Museum, Adolph & Rose Levis Jewish Community Center, Boca Raton, Florida
- 1997 – One Man Exhibit, "Remembering the Shtetl – 75 Years of the Art of Chaim Goldberg," Texas Union Art gallery, University of Texas at Austin
- 2002 – One Man Exhibit, "Oil Paintings of the Shtetl," Shir Art Gallery, Southfield, Michigan
- 2003 – One Man Exhibit, "Landscapes and Observations," Shir Art Gallery, Southfield, Michigan
- 2004 – One Man Exhibit, "Engravings and Lithos," Shir Art Gallery, Southfield, Michigan
- 2009 – Group Exhibition, "Jewish Interwar Painters of Kazimierz Dolny," Poland, Rapperswil Castle by Lake Zurich, Switzerland
- 2009 – One Man Exhibit "Remembering the Shtetl," JRM Artists' Space, National Bottle Museum, Ballston Spa, New York
- 2013 – One Man Show of over 160 drawings, watercolors, and oil paintings from 1946 to 2000, "Chaim Goldberg Returns to Kazimierz Dolny," from 9 December 2013 to 31 August 2014 Muzeum Nadwiślański, Kazimierz Dolny, Poland
- 2015 – One Man Show of drawings and paintings KAMIENICA CELEJOWSKA / 11 grudnia 2015 – 3 kwietnia 2016 Muzeum Nadwiślański, Kazimierz Dolny, Poland
- 2016 – One Man Show of 75 drawings, watercolors, and paintings Museum, I Remember, Kraków, Poland / May 8 – July 28
- 2016 – One Man Show "I Remember The Shtetl" of 100 themed oil paintings, watercolors, drawings, plus 30 of his graphics; works in such mediums as engravings, etchings, and wood engravings, at the Palace of Art in Kraków, September 15 – October 9

== Collections ==
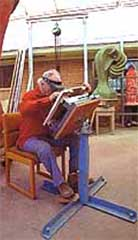
Chaim Goldberg, wood engraving in his outdoor studio, Houston, TX, circa 1977

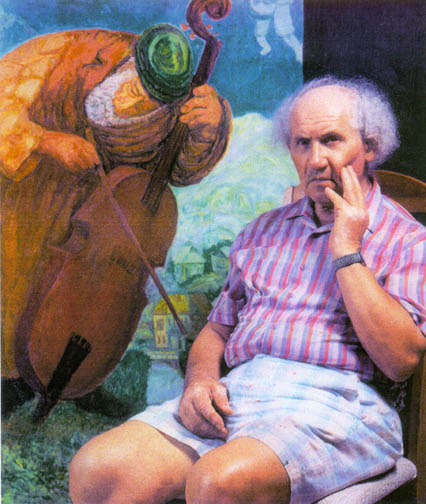
Chaim Goldberg in his Boca Raton, Florida home and studio, fall of 1995

- Metropolitan Museum of Art, 20th Century Permanent Art Collection, New York City, New York
- Museum of Modern Art, New York City, New York
- Beit HaNassi, Jerusalem, Israel
- Yad Vashem, Jerusalem, Israel
- Jerusalem Municipality, Jerusalem, Israel
- Museum Yad Labanim, Petach Tikvah, Israel
- Musée du Petit Palais, Geneva, Switzerland
- National Museum, Warsaw, Poland
- Jewish Museum, Warsaw, Poland
- Klingspor Museum, Offenbach, Germany
- National Gallery of Art, Lessing Rosenwald Collection Washington, D.C.
- National Gallery of Art, Washington, D.C.
- Smithsonian Institution, American Art Museum and Renwick Gallery Collection, Washington, D.C.
- Philadelphia Museum of Art, Philadelphia, Pennsylvania
- Lowe Art Museum, Miami, Florida
- Museum of Fine Arts, Boston, Massachusetts
- Yale University Art Gallery, New Haven, Connecticut
- Sylvia Plotkin Judaica Museum, Phoenix, Arizona
- Public Library Art Collection, San Francisco, California
- New York Public Library, New York City, New York
- Wadsworth Atheneum, Hartford, Connecticut
- Springfield Museum of Art, Springfield, Massachusetts
- Museum of Fine Arts Houston, Houston, Texas
- Houston Public Library, Houston, Texas
- Spertus Institute for Jewish Learning and Leadership, Chicago, Illinois
- Judah L. Magnes Museum, Berkeley, California
- Skirball Museum, Los Angeles, California
- Yeshiva University Museum, New York City, New York
- YIVO, New York City, New York
- Jewish Theological Seminary, Cincinnati, Ohio
- Derfner Judaica Museum, in the Jacob Reingold Pavilion, Riverdale, NY
- POLIN, Warsaw, Poland
- Muzeum Nadwiślański, Kazimierz Dolny, Poland
- Warsaw Ghetto Museum, Warsaw, Poland

== List of Kazimierz-Dolny artists ==
The artists who frequented the Kazimierz-Dolny Art Colony were many, some of the Jewish artists were:

- Maurycy (Mosze) Applebaum (1886–1931)
- Eugeniusz Act (1899–1974)
- Jozef Badower (1910–1941)
- Henryk (Henoch) Barcinski (1896–1939)
- Adolph Behrman (1876–1942)
- Henryk Berlewi (1894–1967)
- Salomon (Szulim) Bialogorski (1900–1942)
- Arnold Blaufuks (1894–1943)
- Sasza (Szaje) Blonder (1909–1949)
- Icchak Wincenty Brauner (1887–1944)
- Aniela Cukier (1900–1944)
- Bencion Cukierman (1890–1944)
- Samuel Cygler (1898–1943)
- Herszel Cyna (1911–1942)
- Henryk (Chaim) Cytryn (1911–1943)
- Jakub Cytryn (1909–1943)
- Rachel Diament (1920–2003)
- Boas Dulman (1900–1942)
- Samuel Finkelstein (1890–1943)
- Abraham Frydman (1906–1941)
- Feliks Frydman (1897–1942)
- Jozef Mojzesz Gabowicz (1862–1939)
- Izydor Goldhuber-Czaj (1896–1942)
- Dawid (Dionizy) Grieffenberg (1909–1942)
- Michal Grusz (1911–1943)
- Izaak Grycendler (1908–1944)
- Chaim Hanft (1899–1951)
- Adam Herszaft (1886–1942)
- Elzbieta Hirszberzanka (1899–1942)
- Ignacy Hirszfang (1903–1943)
- Gizela Hufnagel (1903–1997)
- Marcin Kitz (1891–1943)
- Natan Korzen (1895–1941)
- Józef Kowner (1895–1967)
- Szymon Kratka (1884–1960)
- Izaak Krzeczanowski (1910–1941)
- Chaim Lajzer (1893–1942)
- Natalia Landau (1907–1943)
- Henryk Lewensztadt (1893–1962)
- Mary Litauer (Schneiderowa) (1900–1942)
- Jozef Majzels (1911–1943)
- Arieh Merzer (1910–1974)
- Stella Amelia Miller (1910–? )
- Maurycy Minkowski (1881–1930)
- Abraham Neuman (1873–1942)
- Szlomo Nussbaum (1906–1946)
- Abraham Ostrzega (1889–1942)
- Samuel Puterman (1901–1955)
- Henryk Rabinowicz (1890–1942)
- Stanislawa Reicher (1889–1943)
- Bernard Rolnicki (1885–1942)
- Roman Rozental (1897–1962)
- Mojzesz Rynecki (1885–1942)
- The Seidenbeutel brothers:
  - Efraiim Seidenbeutel (1902–1945)
  - Jozef Seidenbeutel (1894–1923)
  - Menashe Seidenbeutel (1902–1945)
- Efraiim & Gela Seksztajn(1907–1943)
- Marcel Słodki (1892–1943)
- Arieh Sperski (1902–1943)
- Marek Szapiro (1884–1942)
- Natan Spigel (1900–1942)
- Jozef Tom (1886–1962)
- Feliks Topolski (1907–1989)
- Symcha Trachtner (1893–1942)
- Maurycy Trębacz (1861–1941)
- Tadeusz Trebacz (1910–1945)
- Izrael Tykocinski (1895–1942)
- Jakub Weinles (1870–1938)
- Wladyslaw Weintraub (Chaim Wof) (1891–1942)
- Israel Szmuel (Szmul) Wodnicki (1901–1971)
- Pinkus Zelman (1907–1936)
- Izaak Zajdler (1905–1943)
- Leon Zysberg (1901–1942)
- Fiszel Zylberberg (1909–1942)
