= Czysta =

Czysta may refer to:

- Czysta, Pomeranian Voivodeship, Poland
- Czysta, Świętokrzyskie Voivodeship, Poland

== See also ==
- Czysta Woda, Poland
- Czysta Dębina, Poland
- Czysta Dębina-Kolonia, Poland
