= Borsuk =

Borsuk (the word for "badger" in a number of Slavic and Turkic languages) may refer to:

- Angela Borsuk (born 1967), Israeli chess player
- Karol Borsuk (1905–1982), Polish mathematician
- Pavlo Borsuk, Ukrainian canoeist
- Borsuk, Hrubieszów County in Lublin Voivodeship (east Poland)
- Borsuk, Krasnystaw County in Lublin Voivodeship (east Poland)
- Borsuk (infantry fighting vehicle), a Polish IFV made by Huta Stalowa Wola

== See also ==
- Barsuk (disambiguation)
- Bursuq
