= Seidenbeutel brothers =

Polish Jewish artists

Efraim & Menasze Seidenbeutel
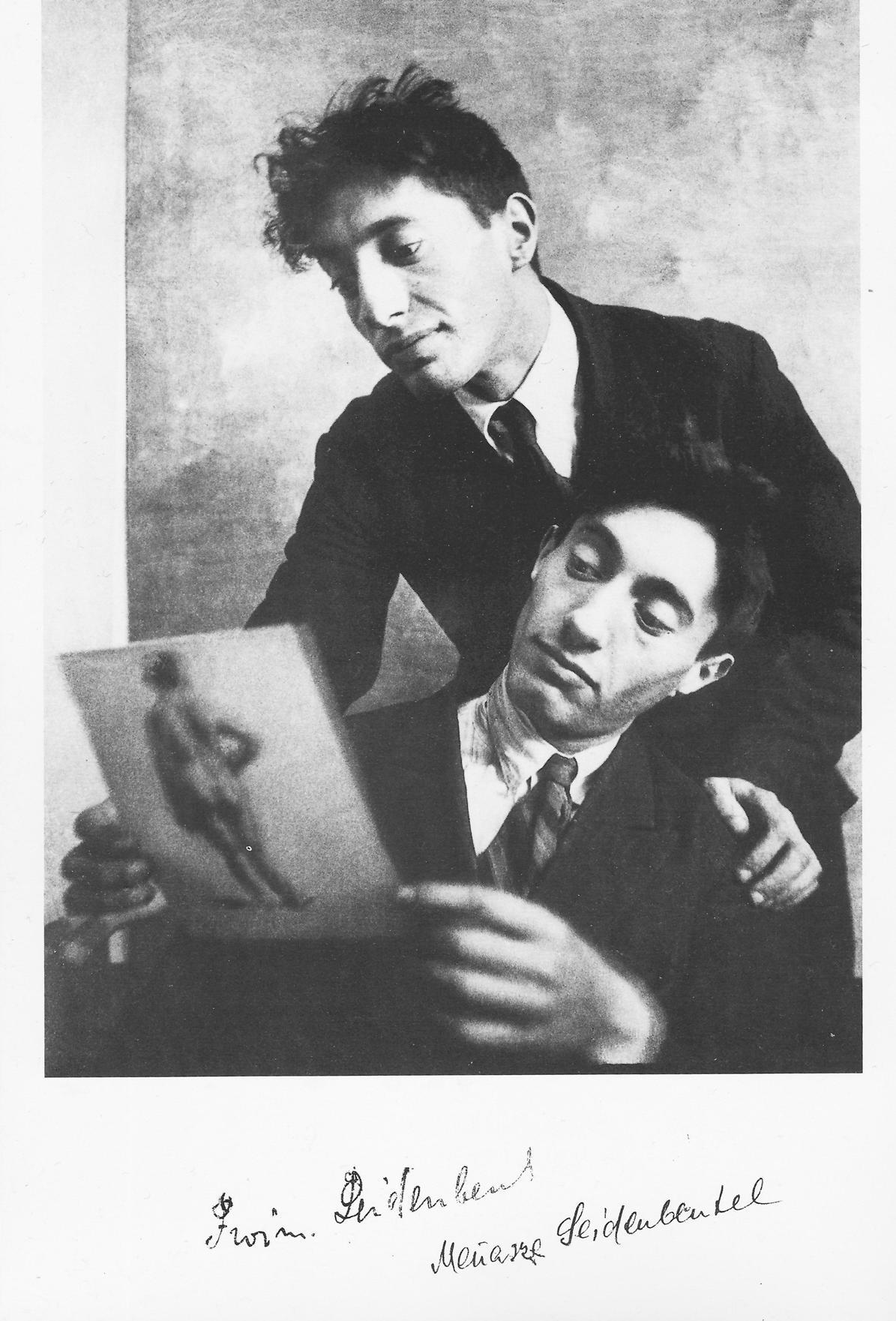
- Born: 1907; Warsaw
- Died: 1945 (aged 37–38)
- Movement: Post impressionist

The Seidenbeutel brothers were Polish Jewish artists who were twins. Efraim Seidenbeutel and Menasze Seidenbeutel were born on December 7, 1907. They were killed in 1945, at the Flossenbürg concentration camp. They had two brothers who were also artists: Józef, the oldest, was a painter, and Hirsz, the youngest, was a sculptor.

== Art ==
The Seidenbeutels are considered "Interwar Artists" and painted in the Post-expressionism of École de Paris. They painted mostly landscapes and still life scenes. The twins had a unique way of working; one brother would start a painting and the other brother would finish it. They would sign the painting with just their surname. Even the works the twins created separately have an almost identical style.

== Biography ==
The Seidenbeutels were born in Warsaw. Their father, Abraham, was a textile trader, and their mother took care of the eight children. Efraim's and Menasze's six siblings included Józef, the oldest, who was also a painter and Hirsz, who was younger and was a sculptor.

=== Education ===
The Seidenbeutels signed up for painting studies in 1921, at the Municipal School of Decorative Arts. In 1922, their sculpture titled “The Portrait of Anski” was shown at the 4th Exhibition of Paintings and Sculptures organized by the Jewish community. Thereafter, they became students at the Academy of Fine Arts in Warsaw, where they belonged to the elitist group "Four" set up by the Rector Tadeusz Pruszkowski. Monika Żeromska remembers that the twins enrolled in school as one student, paid one fee, and took turns attending classes.

=== The pre-war years ===
The Seidenbeutels had their studio at the Jewish dorm on Sierakowskiego Street in the Warsaw district of Praga. Frequently, they would go on field trips to small villages and paint en plein air. One of the towns they visited frequently was Kazimierz Dolny. During the late 1920s and early 1930s, they would arrive for a 'season' carrying over 24 stretched canvases each, and complete them in 30–60 days. These canvases would be exhibited in Warsaw and Kraków and would sell out. They met with other artists and inspired younger ones, such as Chaim Goldberg. They met Goldberg when he was eight-years old and bought him en plein air gouache; it was Goldberg's first sale.

=== The Holocaust Years ===
During World War II and the Nazi occupation, the Seidenbeutels were confined within the Białystok Ghetto where they worked at the House of Art in the army. They may have belonged to a group of painters, set up by Oskar Steffens, who copied reproductions of paintings by old masters. The twins were later sent to the Stutthof concentration camp, from which they were marched to the death camp in Flossenbürg. They were executed by the camp’s guards one day before the camp was liberated. Izaak Celnikier, also a painter, was a witness to their deaths.

== Their unique bond ==
The Seidenbeutels had a unique bond that intrigues experts to the present day. One brother would start a painting while the other completed it, and the signature was their surname. They signed their paintings this way even when completing a painting individually.

Their similar looks became the subject of jokes, the most popular of which is the following:

"They were united forever except when they visited the hairdresser's. The secret is that after agreeing on a desired hairstyle one of them enters the salon and, sitting back in the armchair, gets a hairdresser to cut his hair as he becomes absorbed in reading an illustrated magazine. After a gorgeous haircut is done, with hair gel and eau de cologne added, he makes a payment, not forgetting a tip, and he leaves the salon. Not ten minutes pass by when, outraged, he comes back to make a big hassle saying that the hairdresser only gave him a slight comb and didn’t lift a finger to cut his hair properly. And what did he pay for? Is this how a reliable and trustworthy entrepreneur deals with clients? The owner of the barber's is terrified and asks him for forgiveness; and tells him to be kind enough to take a seat in the armchair once again so that he can make up for his mistake. That is how the Seidenbeutel brothers had their haircut done for half price with plenty of emotions and lots of fun."

— Tadeusz Wittlin

== List of art works ==
Works executed jointly

- Portret An-skiego (Portrait of An-ski) (1921), relief
- Widok z okna (Window view) (1930) oil on canvas, 88×76, in the harvest Muzeum Sztuki w Łodzi
- Martwa natura z kwiatami (Still life with flowers) oil on a glass 69,5×60,8, in private collections
- Droga do wioski (Road to the village) (ok. 1938)
- Studium kobiety z kwiatami (Study of a woman with flowers) (ok. 1930) oil on plywood, 72,5×61, in the harvest Muzeum Narodowego w Szczecinie
- Bukiet kwiatów w wazonie (A bouquet of flowers in a vase) (ok. 1930), oil on canvas, 80,5×69,5, in private collections
- Wioska (The village) oil on canvas 64,8×79,5
- Dziewczyna z gołąbkiem (The girl with a dove) oil on canvas, 73,2×59,7, in the collection of the Jewish Historical Institute
- Dziewczyna z koszem owoców (Girl with a basket of fruit)
- Widok na farę w Kazimierzu (View of the parish church in Kazimierz) oil on plywood 47×33, in private collections
- Mury Kazimierskie (Kazimierz Walls) oil on cardboard, 39×22, in private collections
- Martwa natura (Still life) (ok. 1930) oil on canvas, 80,5×71, in the collection of the National Museum in Warsaw
- Martwa natura (Still life) 70×49, in private collections
- Ulica Krakowska (Krakowska Street)
- Pejzaż z domami (Landscape with houses)
- Siostry (1935) (Sisters)
- Młoda kobieta z kwiatami (Young woman with flowers)
- Zamyślona (Pensive)
- Kobieta w szalu (The woman in the scarf)
- Dwie dziewczyny z owocami (Two girls with fruit)
- Dwie dziewczynki (Two girls)
- Postaci w pejzażu (Figures in the landscape) (ok. 1930), oil on canvas
- Portret mężczyzny w okularach (Portrait of a man with glasses), oil on cardboard, 36,5×32,5, in private collections
- Ulice miasta/ Widok miasta (City streets/ City view) (on the reverse), oil on board, 50×61, in private collections
- Motyw z Helu (Theme from Hel) (ok. 1935), 60×71,5, oil on board, in the collection of the National Museum in Warsaw
- Przedmieście fabryczne (Factory suburb) (1937), oil on plywood, 61×70, in the collection of the District Museum in Bielsko-Biała
- Uliczka w Skoczowie (A street in Skoczów)
- Przydrożna topola (Roadside poplar) (ok. 1938), 64,5×89,6, in the collection of the Jewish Historical Institute
- Motyw ze Śląska Cieszyńskiego (Theme from Cieszyn Silesia) (1937), oil on canvas, 60×73,5, in the collection of the Jewish Historical Institute
- Widok z portu (View from the port) (ok. 1931), 42×45, oil on board, in private collections
- Motyw z zagłębia naftowego (A theme from the oil basin) (1938)
- Koncert (Concert)
- Zmrok (Nightfall)
- Dzieci
- Gołębiarz (Sniper)
- Rowerzyści (Bikers) (1934)
- Matka z dzieckiem (Mother with baby)
- Dziewczyna z gołębiem (The girl with the pigeon), oil on canvas, 80,5×65,8, in the collection of the Jewish Historical Institute
- Przedmieścia Krakowa (The suburbs of Kraków) (1934), oil on plywood, 61×75, in the collection of the Jewish Historical Institute
- Portret Moniki Żeromskiej (Portrait of Monika Żeromska) (1935)
- Martwa natura ze skrzypcami (Still life with a violin)
- Barka na Wiśle (Barge on the Vistula) (ok. 1930), in the collection of the Museum in Ein Harod
- Martwa natura z fajką (Still life with a pipe) (1930)
- Przy kuźni (At the forge) (1936)
- Przy pracy (During work) (1936)
- Ulica w miasteczku z dorożką i stołem przed domem/ Kobieta z owocami na paterze (A street in a town with a horse-drawn carriage and a table in front of the house/ Woman with fruit on a plate) (on the reverse)
- Willa w ogrodzie (Villa in the garden) oil on plywood, 44×48, in the collection of the Museum of Art in Łódź
- Widok z tarasu (View from the terrace) (ok. 1935), 60×70, in private collections
- Żółte róże (Yellow roses) (1932) oil on canvas, 83×73, in the collection of the Museum of Art in Łódź
- Portret dziewczynki z kwiatami (Portrait of a girl with flowers) 87×62,5, in the collection of the National Museum in Warsaw link
- Martwa natura (na obrusie w kratę) (Still life (on the checkered tablecloth)), oil on canvas, 73×93, in the collection of the Jewish Historical Institute
- Miejska uliczka (City street) oil on canvas, 78×70, in private collections
- Widok miasta (City view), oil on cardboard, 27×44,5, in private collections
- Pejzaż wiejski (Rural landscape) (ok. 1930) oil on canvas, 64,5×72, in the collection of the Jewish Historical Institute
- Pejzaż małomiasteczkowy z kościołem w tle (A provincial landscape with a church in the background) (ok. 1933-35), oil on plywood, 62×70, in the collection of the Jewish Historical Institute
- Martwa natura we wnętrzu (Still life in the interior) (ok. 1935-39), oil on canvas, 80×100, in private collections
- Jarmark (Fair), 25×35, watercolor, gouache, ink on paper, in the collection of the Rynek Sztuki Gallery in Łódź

Works by Efraim

- Kulisy (Behind the scenes)
- Widok z okna (Window view) (before 1934), oil on canvas, 98.3 × 79.3, in the collection of the Jewish Historical Institute
- Martwa natura (Still life) (circa 1930), 80.5 × 71, in the collection of the National Museum in Warsaw
- Martwa natura z prymulką (Still life with a primula) (1934), oil on canvas, 70 × 49, in a private collection
- Chłopiec z lampą naftową (Boy with an oil lamp)
- Akt (Act)
- Chłopiec puszczający bańki mydlane (A boy blowing soap bubbles)
- Julka, in the collection of the State Hermitage Museum
- Gitarzysta (Guitarist)
- Chłopiec (Boy)
- Portret brata (Portrait of a brother)
- Port rybacki w Gdyni (Fishing port in Gdynia)
- Motyw Helu (Hel motif)
- Gladiole (Gladiolus) (1934)
- Studium chłopca (A boy study) (1933)
- Magda (1936)
- Kazimierz nad Wisłą (Kazimierz on the Vistula), in the collection of the Museum in Ein Harod
- Sprzedawczyni jabłek (Apple seller), in the collection of the Museum in Ein Harod
- Martwa natura z zieloną butelką (Still life with a green bottle) (circa 1940), oil on canvas, 57 × 71, in the collection of the Museum of the Academy of Fine Arts in Warsaw

Works by Menasze

- Chłopiec z wędką (A boy with a fishing rod) 100 × 83.5, in the collection of the Jewish Historical Institute
- Portret mężczyzny w kapeluszu (Portrait of a man in a hat) oil on canvas, 58.5 × 46.2, in the collection of the Jewish Historical Institute
- Przystań (Harbor) (1931), 43 × 47, oil on plywood, in the collection of the Jewish Historical Institute
- Widok na Kazimierz nad Wisłą (View of Kazimierz on the Vistula River) (1930), oil on canvas, in the collection of the National Museum in Warsaw
- Widok na Kazimierz nad Wisłą (View of Kazimierz on the Vistula River), 72.6 × 65.5, oil on canvas, in the collection of the Jewish Historical Institute
- Widok na Kazimierz nad Wisłą (View of Kazimierz on the Vistula River), 72 × 77.2, oil on canvas, in the collection of the Jewish Historical Institute
- Rynek w Kazimierzu (The market square in Kazimierz) (1934), oil on plywood, 40 × 50, private collection
- Łódka (Boat), in the collection of the Museum in Ein Harod
- Mulatka (1931), (1931), oil on canvas, 60 × 48, in the collection of the Jewish Historical Institute
- Martwa natura (Still life) (1930), oil on canvas, 83 × 72, in the collection of the National Museum in Warsaw
- Zaułek w Kazimierzu nad Wisłą (Alley in Kazimierz on the Vistula) (circa 1930-32), oil on plywood, 38.9 × 41, in the collection of the Jewish Historical Institute
- Motyw z Helu (Theme from Hel)
- Widok na Wawel' (View of the Wawel Castle)
- Martwa natura (Still life) (1940)

== List of exhibitions ==
- 1922 IV Exhibition of Pictures and Sculptures
- 1930 Society for the Encouragement of Fine Arts, Warsaw
- 1931 Poznań
- 1931 IPS, Łódź
- 1931 Geneva, Musee Rath
- 1933 IPS, Warsaw (two exhibitions)
- 1933 College Art Association, New York
- 1933 TPSP
- 1934 XIX Biennale, Venice
- 1934 Riga
- 1835 Brussels
- 1936 IPS, Warsaw
- 1936 IPS, Lviv
- 1938 Moravian Ostrava
- 1939 IPS, Warsaw
- 1939 TPSP
- 1939 London

== Primary references ==
1. (Monika Żeromska, Wspomnienia, Część 1. Czytelnik, 1993, p. 145)
2. (T. Wittlin, Ostatnia cyganeria. Czytelnik, 1989, pp. 147–149.)
3. (The Virtual Shtetl Project) The Virtual Shtetl Project
4. (The Official Website of the Artist Chaim Goldberg)

== Research references ==
1. Grób Szpryncy Seidenbeutel w bazie danych Cmentarza Żydowskiego przy ul. Okopowej w Warszawie
2. Abraham Rotsztejn (born on 20.10.1934 in San Paolo, Brasil) about his maternal family from Warsaw.
3. 3,0 3,1 3,2 3,3 3,4 3,5 3,6 3,7 3,8 3,9 Jerzy Malinowski: Seidenbeutel Efraim, Seidenbeutel Jerzy, Seidenbeutel Menasze. W: Polski Słownik Biograficzny XXXVI Zeszyt 149. 1995, s. 163–167.
4. Efraim i Menasze Seidenbeutlowie 1902-1945: Pośród braci...: obrazy / Efraim i Menasze Seidenbeutlowie 1902-1945: Among the brothers: pictures. Kazimierz Dolny: Muzeum Nadwiślańskie, 2007, s. 14. ISBN 978-83-60736-01-2.
5. Efraim i Menasze Seidenbeutlowie 1902–1945... s. 16
6. 6,00 6,01 6,02 6,03 6,04 6,05 6,06 6,07 6,08 6,09 6,10 6,11 6,12 6,13 Małgorzata Witek-Czyńska. Efraim i Menasze Seidebeutlowie – dzieło wspólne. „Gazeta Antykwaryczna”. 70 (1), 2002.
7. Efraim i Menasze Seidenbeutlowie 1902–1945... s. 35
8. Wiesław Budzyński: Miasto Schulza. Prószyński i S-ka, 2005, s. 401. ISBN 8374690291.
9. Efraim i Menasze Seidenbeutlowie 1902–1945... s. 37
10. J. Jaworska: Nie wszystek umrę ...: twórczość plastyczna Polaków w hitlerowskich więzieniach i obozach koncentracyjnych, 1939-1945. Książka i Wiedza, 1975, s. 40.
11. List of the Jews Deported from the Bialystok Prison to Concentration Camp Stutthof on November 21, 1943 (ang.). [dostęp 2009-10-11].
12. Szlak Dziedzictwa Żydowskiego w Białymstoku. [dostęp 2009-10-10].
13. The Central Database of Shoah Victims' Names: Pages of Testimony (ang.). [dostęp 11 października 2009].
14. The Central Database of Shoah Victims' Names: Pages of Testimony (ang.). [dostęp 11 października 2009].
15. The Central Database of Shoah Victims' Names: Pages of Testimony (ang.). [dostęp 11 października 2009].
16. 16,0 16,1 Zwoje (The Scrolls) 3 (28), 2001. [dostęp 2009-10-10].
17. 17,0 17,1 17,2 Monika Żeromska: Wspomnienia, Część 1. Czytelnik, 1993, s. 145. ISBN 8307023017.
18. 18,0 18,1 Antoni Uniechowski: Antoni Uniechowski o sobie i innych. Iskry, 1966, s. 121–124.
19. Efraim i Menasze Seidenbeutlowie 1902–1945...' s. 8
20. 20,0 20,1 Tadeusz Wittlin: Ostatnia cyganeria. Czytelnik, 1989, s. 147-149. ISBN 8307016738.
21. Włodzimierz Bartoszewicz: Buda na Powiślu. PIW, 1966.
22. Jan Zamoyski: Łukaszowcy: malarze i malarstwo Bractwa św. Łukasza. Wydawnictwa Artystyczne i Filmowe, 1989, s. 52. ISBN 8322104367.
23. Leopold Infeld: Szkice z przeszłości: wspomnienia. Państwowy Instytut Wydawniczy, 1964, s. 40.
24. Hanna Mortkowicz-Olczakowa: Bunt wspomnień. Państwowy Instytut Wydawniczy, 1961, s. 339.
25. Felicja Lilpop Krance: Powroty. 1991, s. 38.
26. Małgorzata Kitowska-Łysiak: Schulzowskie marginalia. Wydawn. KUL, 2007, s. 131.
27. Wiesław Budzyński: Miasto Schulza. Prószyński i S-ka, 2005, s. 401. ISBN 8374690291.
28. Joanna Pollakówna: Byli bracia malarze... : o życiu i malowaniu braci Efraima i Menasze Seidenbeutlów. Warszawa: Wydawnictwo Hotel Sztuki, 2002. ISBN 83-86020-13-X.
29. Efraim i Menasze Seidenbeutlowie 1902–1945...' s. 26
30. 30,0 30,1 Jerzy Malinowski, Barbara Brus-Malinowska: Malarstwo i rzeźba żydów polskich w XIX i XX wieku. Warszawa: Wydawn. Naukowe PWN, 2000. ISBN 83-01-13178-0.
31. Waldemar Odorowski: Malarze Kazimierza nad Wisłą. Krajowa Agencja Wydawnicza, 1991, s. 70.
32. Andrzej K. Olszewski: Dzieje sztuki polskiej 1890-1980 w zarysie. Wydawn. Interpress, 1988, s. 62. ISBN 8322321244.
33. 33,0 33,1 Irena Kossowska: Kultura polska: Efraim i Menasze Seidenbeutel. luty 2005. [dostęp 2009-10-11].
34. T. Czyżewski. Z wystaw: Jeszcze kilku młodych w IPS-i.e. „Prosto z Mostu: tygodnik literacko-artystyczny”. 5 (6), s. 7, 1939.
35. Kolekcja sztuki XX/XXI w.. [dostęp 2009-10-11].
36. Efraim i Menasze Seidenbeutlowie 1902–1945... s. 57
37. Martwa natura z kwiatami. [dostęp 2009-10-12].
38. Droga do wioski. [dostęp 2009-10-12].
39. Bukiet kwiatów w wazonie. [dostęp 2009-10-12].
40. Efraim i Menasze Seidenbeutlowie 1902–1945... s. 70
41. 41,0 41,1 41,2 Efraim i Menasze Seidenbeutlowie 1902–1945... s. 26
42. Efraim i Menasze Seidenbeutlowie 1902–1945... s. 61
43. Martwa natura. [dostęp 2009-10-12].
44. 44,0 44,1 Efraim i Menasze Seidenbeutlowie 1902–1945... s. 27
45. 45,0 45,1 45,2 Efraim i Menasze Seidenbeutlowie 1902–1945... s. 24
46. Efraim i Menasze Seidenbeutlowie 1902–1945... s. 25
47. Efraim i Menasze Seidenbeutlowie 1902–1945... s. 90
48. Efraim i Menasze Seidenbeutlowie 1902–1945... s. 65
49. Efraim i Menasze Seidenbeutlowie 1902–1945... s. 84-85
50. Efraim i Menasze Seidenbeutlowie 1902–1945... s. 76
51. Efraim i Menasze Seidenbeutlowie 1902–1945... s. 87
52. Efraim i Menasze Seidenbeutlowie 1902–1945... s. 83
53. Efraim i Menasze Seidenbeutlowie 1902–1945... s. 91
54. Efraim i Menasze Seidenbeutlowie 1902–1945... s. 78
55. 55,0 55,1 Efraim i Menasze Seidenbeutlowie 1902–1945... s. 28
56. 56,0 56,1 Efraim i Menasze Seidenbeutlowie 1902–1945... s. 29
57. Efraim i Menasze Seidenbeutlowie 1902–1945... s. 66
58. Efraim i Menasze Seidenbeutlowie 1902–1945... s. 69
59. Efraim i Menasze Seidenbeutlowie 1902–1945... s. 92-93
60. Efraim i Menasze Seidenbeutlowie 1902–1945... s. 80
61. Efraim i Menasze Seidenbeutlowie 1902–1945... s. 95
62. Efraim i Menasze Seidenbeutlowie 1902–1945... s. 81
63. Efraim i Menasze Seidenbeutlowie 1902–1945... s. 82
64. Efraim i Menasze Seidenbeutlowie 1902–1945... s. 75
65. Efraim i Menasze Seidenbeutlowie 1902–1945... s. 94
66. Efraim i Menasze Seidenbeutlowie 1902–1945... s. 86
67. Efraim i Menasze Seidenbeutlowie 1902–1945... s. 68
68. Efraim i Menasze Seidenbeutlowie 1902–1945... s. 56
69. Efraim i Menasze Seidenbeutlowie 1902–1945... s. 62
70. Efraim i Menasze Seidenbeutlowie 1902–1945... s. 96
71. Efraim i Menasze Seidenbeutlowie 1902–1945... s. 63
72. Efraim i Menasze Seidenbeutlowie 1902–1945... s. 64
73. Efraim i Menasze Seidenbeutlowie 1902–1945... s. 79
74. Efraim i Menasze Seidenbeutlowie 1902–1945... s. 53
75. Efraim i Menasze Seidenbeutlowie 1902–1945... s. 55
76. Efraim i Menasze Seidenbeutlowie 1902–1945... s. 54
77. Efraim i Menasze Seidenbeutlowie 1902–1945... s. 88
78. Efraim i Menasze Seidenbeutlowie 1902–1945... s. 71
79. Efraim i Menasze Seidenbeutlowie 1902–1945... s. 58
80. Efraim i Menasze Seidenbeutlowie 1902–1945... s. 52
81. Efraim i Menasze Seidenbeutlowie 1902–1945... s. 31
82. Efraim i Menasze Seidenbeutlowie 1902–1945... s. 30
