= Aniela Cukier =

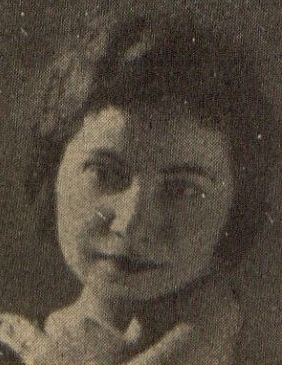
- Born: 1900
- Died: 1944 (aged 43–44)
- Known for: Painting, Woodcuts

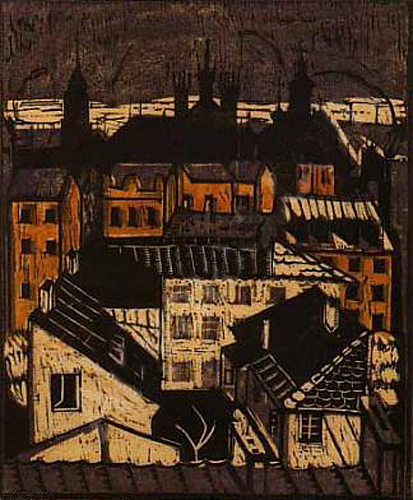
Old Town in Warsaw

Aniela Cukier (1900–1944) was a Jewish painter who is identified as an Inter-War Polish artist.

Cukier's village depictions were mostly executed in graphics, for which she is best known, especially her stylistic color woodcuts. She also painted in oil and pastel, but there she dealt with her subjects in a more realistic style.

Cukier studied painting at a private school run by Konrad Krzyżanowski, and since 1923 she continued her studies at the Warsaw School of Fine Arts, in Mieczysław Kotarbiński and Tadeusz Pruszkowski's classes. She also studied graphics at Edmund Czerwienski's studio. During those years she also frequented open air workshops in the Kazimierz Dolny art colony. She also visited the Krzemieniec art colony, located in the Wolyn region. Her landscapes with views of Kazimierz Dolny, Wiśniów, and Puck dominated her output and became popular, with some translated to woodcuts. Her work was exhibited in Warsaw in 1938 at the Instytut Propagandy Sztuki (Art Promotion Institute). Some of her work has survived and is in demand partly for its rarity and partly for its charm. However, the great majority of her work was destroyed during World War II as was the case for many artists.
