= 1st Don Cossack Division =

- 1-я Донская казачья дивизия
- Active: 1875-1918
- Country: Russian Empire
- Branch: Russian Imperial Army
- Engagements: World War I; Battle of the Vistula River

The 1st Don Cossack Division was a Don Cossack cavalry division of the Russian Imperial Army. It was part of the 19th Army Corps in the Warsaw Military District.

In November [O.S. October] 1917, Pyotr Krasnov led regiments of the 1st Don Cossack Division towards Petrograd to stop the Bolshevik seizure of power from the Russian Provisional Government, but the attempt fell apart.

== Order of battle in 1914 ==
The division included the following.

- 1st Brigade (HQ Krasnik)
  - 9th Don Cossack Regiment
  - 10th Don Cossack Regiment
- 2nd Brigade (HQ Zamostek)
  - 13th Don Cossack Regiment
  - 15th Don Cossack Regiment
- 1st Don Cossack Artillery Division (HQ Zamostek)
  - 6th Don Cossack Battery
  - 7th Don Cossack Battery

== Commanders ==
- 20 April 1875 – ? - Lieutenant General, adjutant general Ivan Ivanovich Shamshev
- 4 September 1879 – 16 September 1883 Lieutenant Colonel (after 30 April 1880 Colonel) Konstantin Yefimovich Przhevlotsky
- 1 September 1889 — 20 October 1893 Lieutenant General Ivan Alexeyevich Andriyanov
- 9 December 1893 — 20 August 1898 — Major General Mitrofan Ilyich Grekov
- 10 November 1898 – 5 August 1900 - Lieutenant General David Ivanovich Orlov
- 18 September 1900 – 6 May 1901 - Major General Ippolit Appolovich Pozdeyev
- 1 February 1913 – after 1 April 1914 - Lieutenant General Aleksei Lvovich Vershinin
- 18 July 1914 – 15 August 1914 - Lieutenant General Aglay Dmitriyevich Kuzmin-Korovaev
- 15 August 1914 – 20 May 1916 - Major General (after 13 July 1915 Lieutenant General) Grigory Ivanovich Choglokov
- 13 June 1916 – ? - Major General Pyotr Ivanovich Grekov
- June 1917 – November 1917 - Major General Vladimir Petrovich Popov

== Chiefs of Staff ==
- 4 September 1879 - 16 July 1883 — Colonel Konstantin Yefimovich Przhevlotsky
- 1883 - after 1 May 1884 — Colonel Lev Matveyevich Baykov
- 11 May 1884 - 1887 — Colonel Vladimir Ivanovich Giber fon Greynfenfels
- 8 April 1887 - 2 July 1893 — Colonel Pyotr Konstantinovich Vasilyev
- 2 July 1893 – 4 March 1894 - Colonel Valerian Alexandrovich Karandeyev
- 6 March 1894 – 3 May 1898 - Colonel Mikhail Mikhailovich Pleshkov
- 13 June 1898 – 21 December 1899 - Colonel Eduard Karlovich von Klodt
- 22 February 1900 – 1 June 1904 - Colonel Viktor Pavlovich Shirokov
- 28 September 1904 - 28 October 1911 — Colonel Vladimir Ivanovich Marchenko
- 1 December 1911 - 12 August 1913 — Colonel Dmitry Yevdokimovich Nemov
- 8 December 1913 – 24 March 1915 - Lieutenant Colonel (after 6 December 1914 Colonel) Aleksandr Vasilyevich Benzengr
- June 1915 – 17 October 1915 - Colonel Viktor Zakharevich Savelyev
- 5 March 1916 - after 1 August 1916 — Colonel Vladimir Petrovich Popov
- 1917 - unknown - Captain Vasily Mikhailovich Azhogin

== Commanders of the 1st Brigade ==
- 7 May 1877 - 30 December 1884 — Major General Nikolai Petrovich Yanov
- 10 April 1885 - 26 February 1886 — Major General Ivan Vasilyevich Ilovaysky
- 23 July 1886 - 8 April 1890 — Major General Pyotr Alekandrovich Leonov
- 2 April 1890 - 22 January 1894 — Major General Vasily Nikolayevich Turchaninov
- 22 January 1894 - 24 January 1900 — Major General Nikolai Matveyevich Kalinin
- 9 March 1900 - 25 November 1904 — Major General Nikolai Petrovich Ilovaysky
- 7 December 1904 - 20 January 1906 — Major General Pyotr Petrovich Grekov
- 18 May 1906 - 17 January 1910 — Major General Fyodor Fyodorovich Abramov
- 17 February 1910 - 7 June 1911 — Major General Nikolai Yakovlevich Dyakov
- 12 July 1911 - 11 September 1913 — Major General Ivan Ivanovich Kamennov
- 11 September 1913 - 9 November 1913 — Major General Nikanor Arkadyevich Lashchilin
- 18 December 1913 - 15 February 1916 — Major General Yefim Fyodorovich Kunakov
- 27 April 1916 - 26 March 1917 — Colonel Ivan Ivanovich Kryukov
- 19 May 1917 — Colonel Ilya Maksimovich Tolokonnikov

== Commanders of the 2nd Brigade ==
- 31 August 1875 - 7 May 1877 — Major General Viktor Alekseyevich Rodionov
- 23 February 1878 - 2 March 1889 — Major General Grigori Fyodorovich Chernozubov
- 8 April 1890 - 20 June 1890 — Major General Pyotr Aleksandrovich Leonov
- 26 October 1890 - 19 August 1899 — Major General Nikolai Modestovich Yagodin
- 20 November 1899 - 12 June 1904 — Major General Ivan Andreyevich Luizov
- 25 June 1904 - 26 December 1911 — Major General Stepan Alekseyevich Boldyrev
- 14 January 1912 - 17 December 1913 — Major General Yefim Fyodorovich Kunakov
- 18 December 1913 - 6 October 1914 — Major General Konstantin Semyonovich Polyakov
- 6 October 1914 - 13 June 1916 — Major General Pyotr Ivanovich Grekov
- 22 October 1917 — ? — Colonel Matvei Matveyevich Ivanov
- 9 September 1916 - 22 October 1917 — Major General Boris Rostislavovich Khreshchatitsky

== Sources ==
- Littauer, Vladimir. Russian Hussar. p. 220. ISBN 1-59048-256-5.
- Albert Seaton, page 27 "The Cossacks", SBN 85045 116 7
