= Anna Maria Klechniowska =

Polish composer (1888–1973)

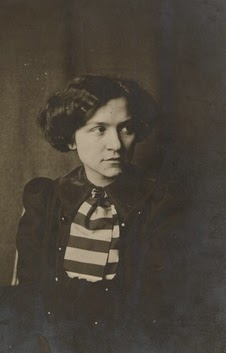

Background information
- Born: 15 April 1888; Borów, Lublin Governorate, Congress Poland, Russian Empire
- Died: 26 August 1973 (aged 85); Warsaw, Polish People's Republic
- Genres: Classical music
- Occupation(s): Composer, pianist, teacher
- Instrument: Piano

Anna Maria Klechniowska (15 April 1888 – 28 Aug 1973) was a Polish music educator and composer. She was born in Borowka, Ukraine, and studied at the Warsaw and Lemberg (Lviv) Conservatories, and then in Leipzig and Paris. She graduated from the Vienna Academy in 1917, after studying with Lech Jaczynowski, Gustaw Roguski, Mieczyslaw Soltys, Josef Pembaur, Stanisław Niewiadomski, Stephan Krehl, Klara Czop-Umlauf, Franz Schmidt and Nadia Boulanger. After completing her studies, she worked as a teacher and arts administrator. She died in Warsaw.

== Works ==
Klechniowska was known for piano works for young children and vocal compositions. Selected works include:

- A Wedding Overture, for orchestra (1955)
- The Seasons of the Year, symphonic suite (1953)
- The Royal Castle in Cracow, symphonic poem
- Phantasma, ballet-pantomime in 6 scenes, (1964)
