= Samuel Finkelstein =

Polish painter (1895–1942)

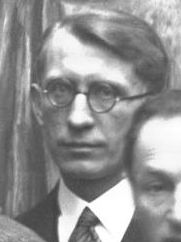
- Samuel Finkelstein (right) at a 1933 art opening in Kraków with colleague from Jednoróg, painter Tadeusz Seweryn (right; later Holocaust rescuer)
- Born: Samuel Finkelstein; 1895; Sandomierz, Radom Governorate, Congress Poland
- Died: 1942 (aged 46–47); Treblinka, General Government (German-occupied Poland)
- Known for: Still life
- Movement: Inter-War Polish Artists

Samuel Finkelstein (1895–1942) was a Jewish oil painter in interwar Poland who died at the Nazi death camp Treblinka during the Holocaust.

== Biography ==
Finkelstein was born in Sandomierz, in the Radom Governorate of Congress Poland. He first graduated from a trade school, but became dissatisfied with the trades and started painting. His friends and family suggested he take art classes, and in 1913–1914, he enrolled at the Kraków Academy of Fine Arts where he studied under Wojciech Weiss of the Young Poland movement. After World War I, he settled in Łódź, where he exhibited steadily and became active in the arts of the city.

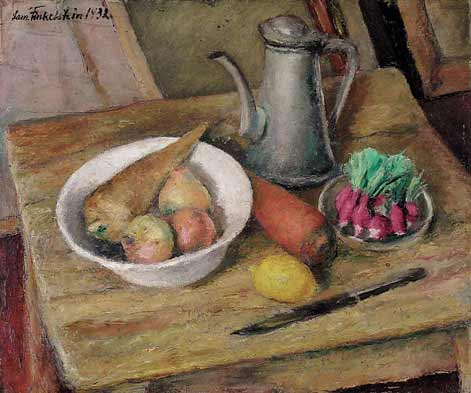
Samuel Finkelstein, "Still life", oil, 1932

He became a member of the “Start” Painters Association, and the City of Łódź Artists’ Association. He also traveled regularly to various art colony areas and the artists’ village of Kazimierz Dolny. He became active in the Kraków art scene by joining the Jednoróg Artists Guild – a group of graduates of Kraków Academy – and exhibiting with them. He also participated in the activities of the Jewish community and painted scenes of daily life. He was included in “The World Evoked” exhibition of Jewish culture organized by the Nowy Sącz District Museum.

Although he was affiliated in his own city with the Constructivist Avant Garde and was friendly with such artists as Władysław Strzemiński, Kataryna Kobro and Karol Hiller, his paintings bore the impressionist traditional style in their motifs, colors and his brush-work. When Finkelstein traveled to Kazimierz Dolny, he painted the Jewish life outdoors as he saw it. Chaim Goldberg, an artist born in Kazimierz, recalled the artist as he stood by himself in a field painting.

Samuel Finkelstein died in 1942 during the Holocaust at Treblinka, a Nazi extermination camp.
