= Gorzków, Krasnystaw County =

Gorzków
- Hamlet
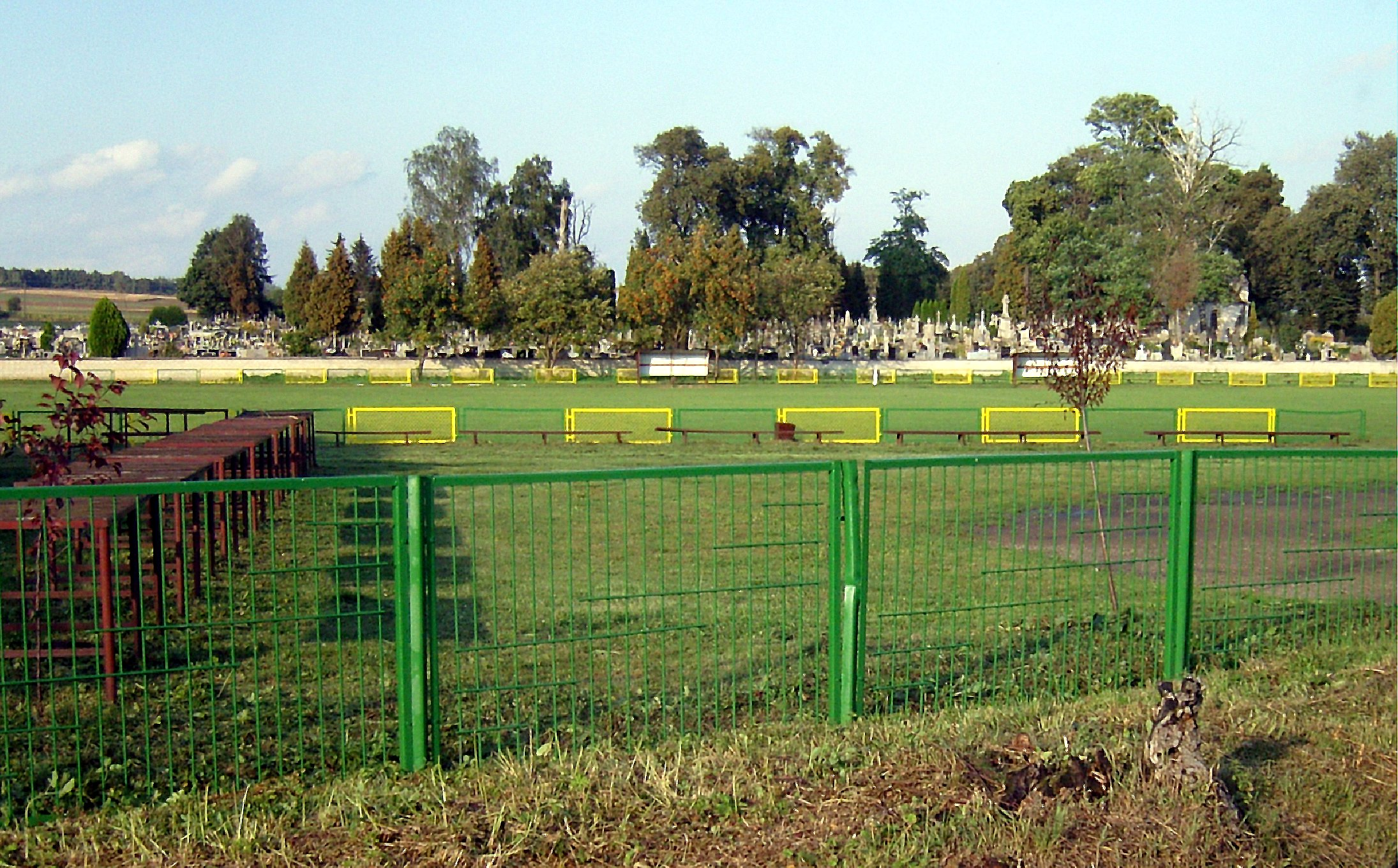
- View of the local football team GKS Zryw Gorzków's pitch

- Location within Poland
- Coordinates: 50°56′N 23°0′E
- Country: Poland
- Voivodeship: Lublin
- County: Krasnystaw
- Gmina: Gorzków
- Population: 264

Gorzków [ˈɡɔʂkuf] is a hamlet in Krasnystaw County, Lublin Voivodeship, in eastern Poland. It is the seat of the gmina (administrative district) called Gmina Gorzków.
