= Widniówka, Gmina Gorzków =

Widniówka
- Colony
- Location within Poland
- Coordinates: 50°57′07″N 23°02′44″E
- Country: Poland
- Voivodeship: Lublin
- County: Krasnystaw
- Gmina: Gorzków

Widniówka [vʲidˈɲufka] is a colony in the administrative district of Gmina Gorzków, within Krasnystaw County, Lublin Voivodeship, in eastern Poland.
