= Gmina Gorzków =

Gmina Gorzków Gorzków Commune
- Gmina
- Coat of arms
- Interactive map of Gmina Gorzków
- Coordinates (Gorzków): 50°56′N 23°0′E
- Country: Poland
- Voivodeship: Lublin
- County: Krasnystaw
- Seat: Gorzków

Area
  - Total: 96.19 km^{2} (37.14 sq mi)

Population (2006)
  - Total: 4,055
  - Density: 42.16/km^{2} (109.2/sq mi)
- Website: https://web.archive.org/web/20080210020419/http://www.gorzkow.gmina.woi.lublin.pl/

Gmina Gorzków is a rural gmina (administrative district) in Krasnystaw County, Lublin Voivodeship, in eastern Poland. Its seat is the village of Gorzków, which lies approximately 14 kilometres (9 mi) south-west of Krasnystaw and 47 km (29 mi) south-east of the regional capital Lublin.

The gmina covers an area of 96.19 square kilometres (37.1 sq mi), and as of 2006 its total population is 4,055.

== Villages ==
Gmina Gorzków contains the villages and settlements of Antoniówka, Baranica, Bobrowe, Bogusław, Borów, Borów-Kolonia, Borsuk, Chorupnik, Czysta Dębina, Czysta Dębina-Kolonia, Felicjan, Góry, Gorzków, Gorzków-Wieś, Józefów, Olesin, Orchowiec, Piaski Szlacheckie, Widniówka, Wielkopole, Wielobycz, Wiśniów and Zamostek.

== Neighbouring gminas ==
Gmina Gorzków is bordered by the gminas of Izbica, Krasnystaw, Łopiennik Górny, Rudnik, Rybczewice and Żółkiewka.
