= Orchowiec =

- Village
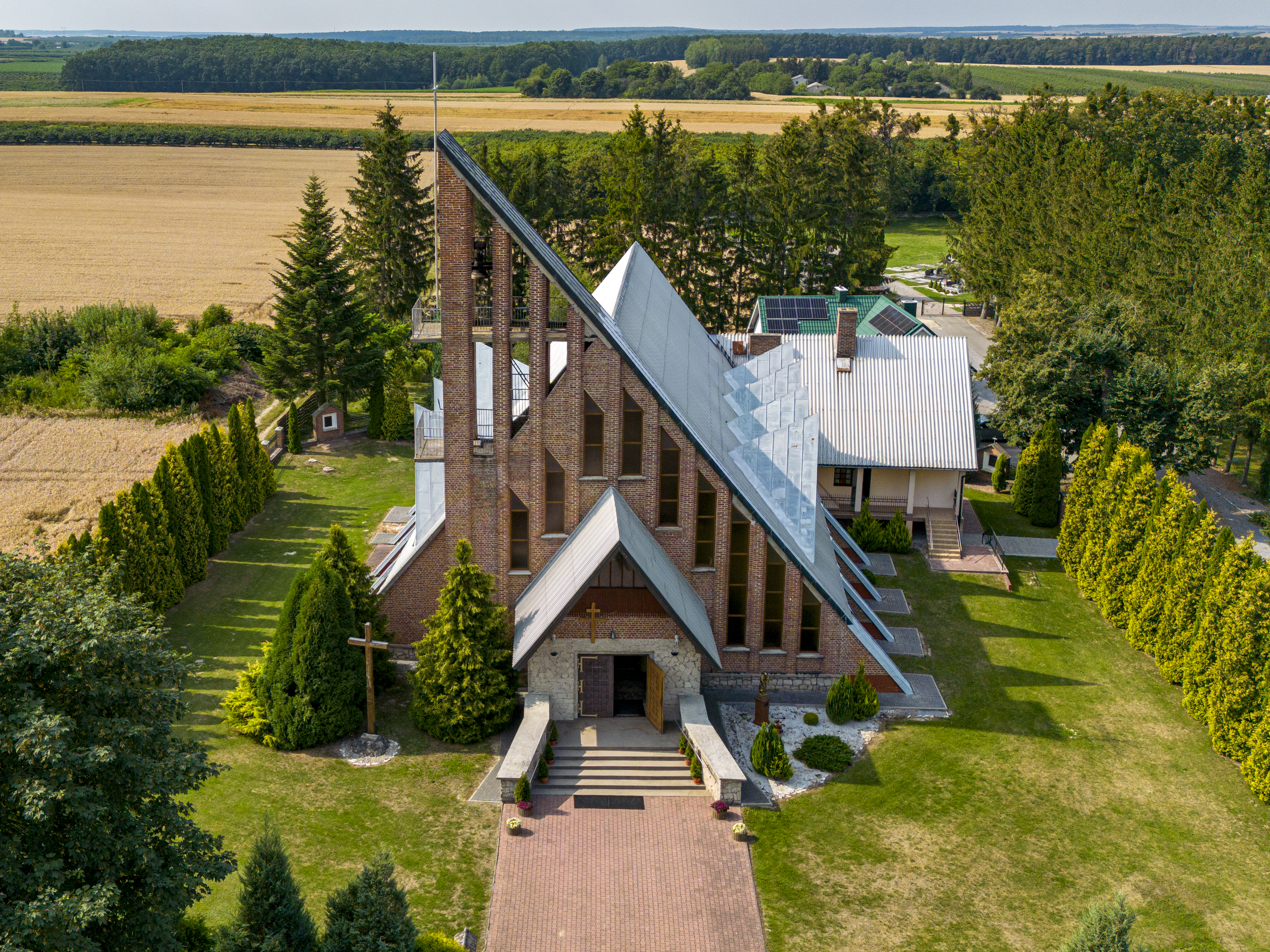
- Mater Ecclesiae church in Orchowiec

- Location within Poland
- Coordinates: 50°58′N 22°56′E
- Country: Poland
- Voivodeship: Lublin
- County: Krasnystaw
- Gmina: Gorzków
- Time zone: UTC+1 (CET)
  - Summer (DST): UTC+2 (CEST)

Orchowiec [ɔrˈxɔvʲɛt͡s] is a village in the administrative district of Gmina Gorzków, within Krasnystaw County, Lublin Voivodeship, in eastern Poland.

== History ==
Four Polish citizens were murdered by Nazi Germany in the village during World War II.
