= Józefów, Gmina Gorzków =

Józefów
- Colony
- Location within Poland
- Coordinates: 50°54′29″N 23°00′15″E
- Country: Poland
- Voivodeship: Lublin
- County: Krasnystaw
- Gmina: Gorzków

Józefów (Polish pronunciation: [juˈzɛfuf]) is a colony in the administrative district of Gmina Gorzków, within Krasnystaw County, Lublin Voivodeship, in eastern Poland.
