= Chorupnik =

- Village
- Location within Poland
- Coordinates: 50°56′N 23°0′E
- Country: Poland
- Voivodeship: Lublin
- County: Krasnystaw
- Gmina: Gorzków
- Population: 470

Chorupnik [xɔˈrupɲik] is a village in the administrative district of Gmina Gorzków, within Krasnystaw County, Lublin Voivodeship, in eastern Poland.
