= Antoniówka, Krasnystaw County =

Antoniówka
- Village
- Location within Poland
- Coordinates: 50°57′45″N 22°53′25″E
- Country: Poland
- Voivodeship: Lublin
- County: Krasnystaw
- Gmina: Gorzków

Antoniówka [antɔˈɲufka] is a village in the administrative district of Gmina Gorzków, within Krasnystaw County, Lublin Voivodeship, in eastern Poland.
