= Ivan Ivanovich Shamshev =

Imperial Russian lieutenant general, adjutant general and division commander

- Born: May 4, 1819
- Died: April 21, 1892 (aged 72)
- Allegiance: Russian Empire
- Branch: Imperial Russian Army
- Commands: 1st Don Cossack Division
- Conflicts: Caucasian War; Hungarian Campaign; Crimean War; January Uprising; Russo-Turkish War

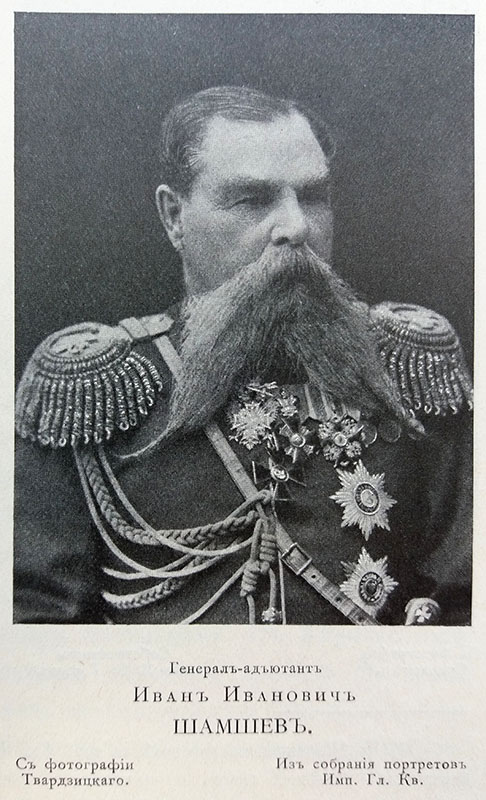

Ivan Ivanovich Shamshev (May 4, 1819 – April 21, 1892) was an Imperial Russian lieutenant general, adjutant general and division commander. He fought in the Caucasus, Hungary, Crimea, Poland and against the Ottoman Empire.

== Awards ==
- Order of Saint Vladimir, 3rd class, 1863
- Order of Saint Stanislaus (House of Romanov), 1st class, 1865
- Order of Saint Anna, 1st class, 1867
- Order of Saint Vladimir, 2nd class, 1871
- Order of the White Eagle (Russian Empire), 1878
- Gold Sword for Bravery, 1879

Preceded by New office	Commander of the 1st Don Cossack Division; 1875	Succeeded by Constantine Yefimovich Przhevlockij

== Sources ==
- Русский биографический словарь: В 25 т. / под наблюдением А. А. Половцова. 1896–1918.
- Список генералам по старшинству. Составлен по 1 сентября 1891 г. — СПб., 1891. — С. 58.
- Шамшев И.И. Рассказы старого лейб-казака // Русская старина, 1876. - Т. 17. - № 12. - С. 834-842.
