= Gorzków-Wieś =

- Village
- Location within Poland
- Coordinates: 50°56′09″N 23°00′05″E
- Country: Poland
- Voivodeship: Lublin
- County: Krasnystaw
- Gmina: Gorzków

Gorzków-Wieś [ˈɡɔʂkuf ˈvjɛɕ] is a village in the administrative district of Gmina Gorzków, within Krasnystaw County, Lublin Voivodeship, in eastern Poland.
