= Borów-Kolonia, Krasnystaw County =

Settlement in Poland

Borów-Kolonia
- Colony
- Location within Poland
- Coordinates: 50°55′N 22°58′E
- Country: Poland
- Voivodeship: Lublin
- County: Krasnystaw
- Gmina: Gorzków

Borów-Kolonia [ˈbɔruf kɔˈlɔɲa] is a colony in the administrative district of Gmina Gorzków, within Krasnystaw County, Lublin Voivodeship, in eastern Poland.
