= Wielkopole, Krasnystaw County =

Wielkopole
- Village
- Location within Poland
- Coordinates: 50°58′N 23°2′E
- Country: Poland
- Voivodeship: Lublin
- County: Krasnystaw
- Gmina: Gorzków

Wielkopole [vʲɛlkɔˈpɔlɛ] is a village in the administrative district of Gmina Gorzków, within Krasnystaw County, Lublin Voivodeship, in eastern Poland.
