= Felicjan, Lublin Voivodeship =

Felicjan
- Colony
- Location within Poland
- Coordinates: 50°58′9″N 22°58′13″E
- Country: Poland
- Voivodeship: Lublin
- County: Krasnystaw
- Gmina: Gorzków

Felicjan [fɛˈlʲit͡sjan] is a colony in the administrative district of Gmina Gorzków, within Krasnystaw County, Lublin Voivodeship, in eastern Poland.
