= Bogusław, Lublin Voivodeship =

Bogusław
- Village
- Location within Poland
- Coordinates: 50°58′29″N 22°55′11″E
- Country: Poland
- Voivodeship: Lublin
- County: Krasnystaw
- Gmina: Gorzków

Bogusław [bɔˈɡuswaf] is a village in the administrative district of Gmina Gorzków, within Krasnystaw County, Lublin Voivodeship, in eastern Poland.
