= Viktor Zakharevich Savelyev =

Russian General

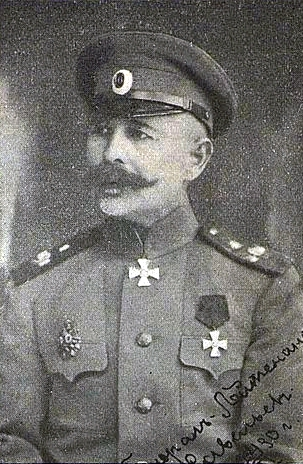
- Born: 2 February 1875 Yermakovskaya, Don Host Oblast, Russian Empire
- Died: 1943 (aged 67–68) Kingdom of Bulgaria
- Allegiance: Russian Empire; White movement
- Branch: Imperial Russian Army
- Rank: lieutenant general
- Conflicts: World War I Russian Civil War

Viktor Zakharevich Savelyev (Russian: Виктор Захарьевич Савельев; 2 February 1875 – 1943) was a Russian general. At the beginning of World War I, he was still a colonel. He was promoted to major general in 1915. He was a recipient of the Order of Saint Anna, the Order of Saint George, the Order of Saint Stanislaus (House of Romanov) and the Gold Sword for Bravery. After the October Revolution, he opposed the Bolsheviks and later emigrated to Bulgaria.

== Bibliography ==
- Клавинг В.. Гражданская война в России: Белые армии. — М., 2003. — (Военно-историческая библиотека)

Military offices
Preceded by Aleksandr Benzengr	Chief of Staff of the 1st Don Cossack Division; 1915	Succeeded by Vladimir Popov
