= Barsuk (disambiguation) =

Barsuk literally means 'badger' in Russian. It may refer to:

- Barsuk Records
- Barsuk machine gun
- Anastasia Barsuk
- Dmitri Barsuk
- Tatiana Barsuk

== See also ==
- Borsuk (disambiguation)
