= Kovarski =

The surname Kovarski, Kovarsky, Kowarski, Kowarsky (Russian-language feminine: Kovarskaya, Polish-language feminine: Kowarska, Romanian feminine: Kovarskaia) is typically associated with people of Jewish origin. It is a toponymic surname associated with one of the places named Kowary. It may be either transliterated from Russian language (spelled with 'v') or from Polish (spelled with 'w').

The surname may refer to:

- Alexander Kovarski (born 1944), Russian chemist
- Anatolie Kovarski (1904–1974), Soviet Moldovan Jewish agronomist
- Brigitta P. Kovarskaia (1930–1998), Soviet Moldovan physicist, computer scientist, historian
- Felicjan Kowarski (1890–1948), Polish painter and sculptor
- Kovarska, pen name of Corinne Chochem (1905–1990), Jewish American choreographer and painter
- Lee Kovarsky, American legal scholar
- Lew Kowarski (1907–1979), French physicist
- Ori Kowarsky, Canadian filmmaker
- Ryan and Dan Kowarsky, Canadian musical duo
- Simon Kovarski, birth name of Simon Kovar (1890–1970), bassoonist
- Victor Kovarski (1929–2000) Soviet Moldovan Jewish physicist

== See also ==
- Kirk Karwoski, the surname was mangled during emigration
