= Czysta Dębina =

- Village
- Location within Poland
- Coordinates: 50°56′32″N 22°55′49″E
- Country: Poland
- Voivodeship: Lublin
- County: Krasnystaw
- Gmina: Gorzków

Czysta Dębina [ˈt͡ʂɨsta dɛmˈbʲina] is a village in the administrative district of Gmina Gorzków, within Krasnystaw County, Lublin Voivodeship, in eastern Poland.
