= Zamostek =

- Village
- Location within Poland
- Coordinates: 50°57′N 23°1′E
- Country: Poland
- Voivodeship: Lublin
- County: Krasnystaw
- Gmina: Gorzków

Zamostek [zaˈmɔstɛk] is a village in the administrative district of Gmina Gorzków, within Krasnystaw County, Lublin Voivodeship, in eastern Poland.
