= Jakub Cytryn =

Jakub Cytryn (1909 – 1943) was a Jewish painter in the interwar Poland. He specialized in landscape painting and Jewish themes.

Born in Opatów, in the historic province of Lesser Poland, Cytryn showed his art talent already in his teenage years. He studied at the Academy of Fine Arts in Warsaw around 1932. He took part in the LXXXI Annual Art Exhibition of the Jewish association of Fine Arts' Promotion in Warsaw in 1935. A year later, along with his brother, painter Henryk (Chaim) Cytryn (1911–1943), they prepared decorations for the “Little White Beds” ball at the European Hotel in Warsaw. In 1939, he participated in the summer exhibition in Kazimierz Dolny along with art by his brother. The Cytryn brothers were killed during the Holocaust.

== Bibliography ==
- Dr. Waldemar Odorowski (author and editor), In Kazimierz the Vistula River spoke to them in Yiddish...: Jewish painters in the art colony of Kazimierz Dolny, published by Muzeum Nadwislanskie, Kazimierz Dolny, Poland 2008
