= Maurycy Minkowski =

Polish painter

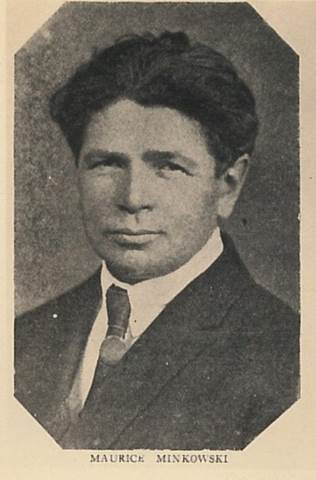
Maurycy Minkowski (1920s)

Maurycy Minkowski (1881/82, Warsaw – 23 November 1930, Buenos Aires) was a Polish painter of Jewish ancestry, best known for his genre scenes of daily life in the shtetls.

== Biography ==
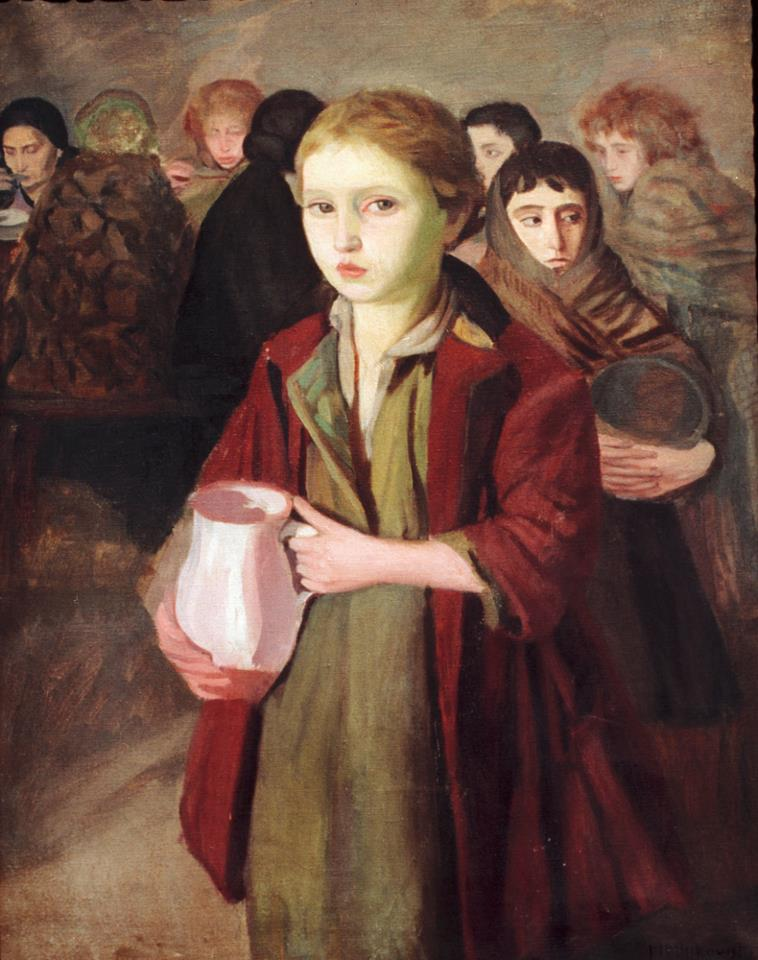
Young Exiles

He was born to a wealthy family. An illness he had when he was a small child left him deaf and without speech. At the age of seven, he entered the "Institute for the Deaf" and showed an early talent for drawing, which encouraged his parents to pay for private lessons. In 1901, he began his formal studies at the Kraków Academy of Fine Arts, where he was a student of Józef Mehoffer, Jan Stanisławski and Leon Wyczółkowski. He graduated in 1905 with a gold medal.

Having been informed of the pogroms taking place in Odessa, he went there to document the events with a series of drawings. After that, he made a study trip through Germany and Austria and returned to Warsaw. He stayed for only a short time however, then went to Paris in 1908, where he got married and decided to settle permanently, although he frequently went back to Poland to participate in open-air painting workshops in Kazimierz Dolny, Sniatyn and Kraśnik. His paintings were exhibited in Vilnius and Łódź, as well as at the Zachęta.

In early November 1930, he went to Argentina to help prepare the first overseas exhibition of his paintings. Later that month, unable to hear the honking of an oncoming taxi, he was struck and killed. The exhibition was presented as a posthumous tribute to his work, under the aegis of the Jewish Association of Argentina. In 1931, a committee was established to raise funds for the purchase of his works.

In 1942, a great majority of his works were auctioned off. Most were purchased by the "Fundación IWO" (the Argentine branch of YIVO) and were stored at the Asociación Mutual Israelita Argentina. A few of the paintings were destroyed and many suffered some degree of damage in 1994, when the building was destroyed by a car-bomb, killing 85 people. The surviving paintings were exhibited at the Eduardo Sívori Museum in 2011.

== Selected paintings ==
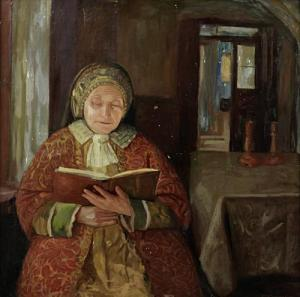
Woman Praying

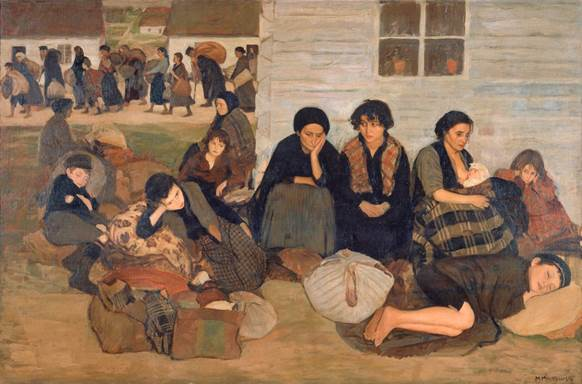
After the Pogrom

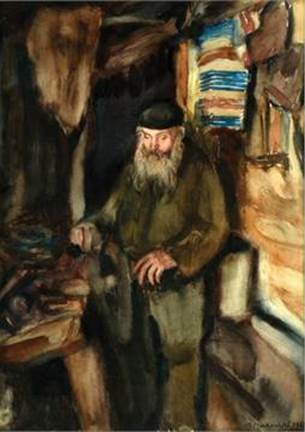
The Peddler

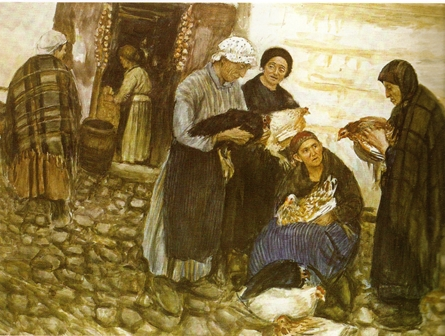
Poultry Market
