= Borsuk, Hrubieszów County =

Borsuk
- Village
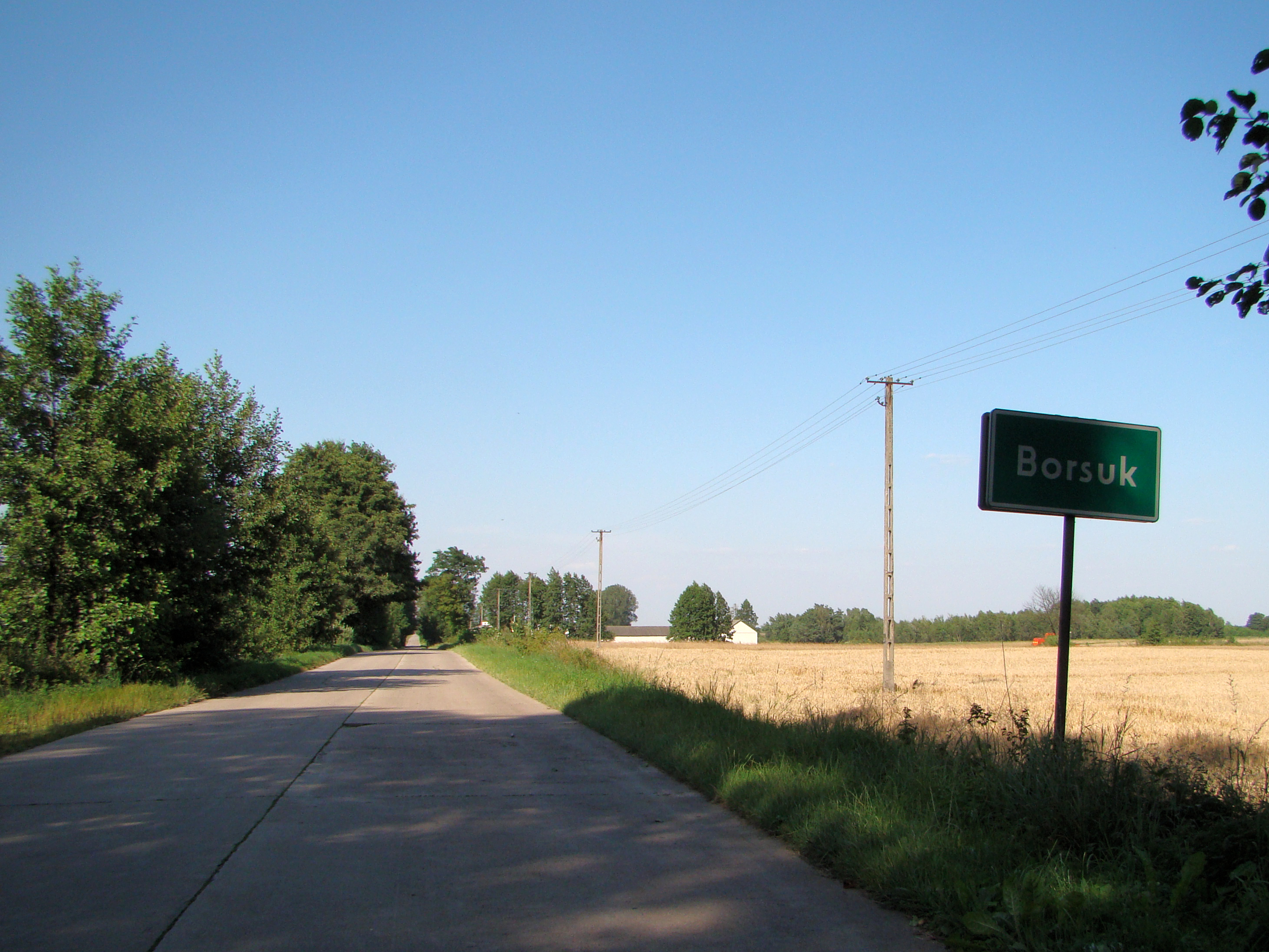

- Location within Poland
- Coordinates: 50°37′46″N 23°52′26″E
- Country: Poland
- Voivodeship: Lublin
- County: Hrubieszów
- Gmina: Mircze

Borsuk [ˈbɔrsuk] is a village in the administrative district of Gmina Mircze, within Hrubieszów County, Lublin Voivodeship, in eastern Poland, close to the border with Ukraine.
