= Józef Kowner =

- Born: Zelman Gotlib; Kiev, Russian Empire; 1 December 1895
- Died: 8 May 1967 (aged 71); Kalmar, Sweden
- Movement: Realism

Józef Kowner, born Zelman Gotlib (born 1 December 1895 in Kyiv; died 8 May 1967 in Kalmar) was a Polish-Swedish painter and illustrator of Jewish descent.

== Biography ==
The son of Szebsel Kowner, a high school teacher, and Zlata née Szewelew. The parents and their son settled in Łódź two years after his birth.

Józef (Zelman) Kowner began his art studies in 1912, but interrupted them after a year. In 1917, he went to Düsseldorf, where he studied for a year. He then spent a year in Paris, and in 1919 he returned to Łódź. He made his debut in 1928 at an exhibition at the Łódź Municipal Art Gallery, and subsequently exhibited his works in 1932, 1937 and 1939, including at the Łódź gallery of the Institute of Art Propaganda in the park. He participated in exhibitions organized by the Jewish Society for the Promotion of Fine Arts, which took place in Łódź, Warsaw, Krakow and Lviv.

From 1929, he was a member of the "Start" Art Group, and was also a member of "Sztuka" and the editorial board of the journal "Forma" of the Polish Artists' Union in Łódź.

After the outbreak of World War II, he was imprisoned in the Łódź Ghetto, where he created watercolors depicting life and work there. He was one of the few artists to receive financial support from Chaim Rumkowski, the Eldest of the Jews in Łódź, but he worked in a carpet factory. In August 1944, during the liquidation of the ghetto, he was deported, along with other prisoners, to the Auschwitz-Birkenau concentration camp. Only he and his nephew, Leon, survived the extermination and subsequently settled in Israel.

After the liberation of the camp, as part of the Swedish convalescence program for former concentration camp prisoners, he was transported to Sweden, where, after its completion, he began working as an art teacher. In 1952, he obtained Swedish citizenship. He exhibited his works in solo exhibitions in Kalmar, Oskarshamn, at the Louis Hahnes Art Gallery and the Gallery of Contemporary Art in Stockholm, as well as in numerous group exhibitions.

He died in 1967 in Kalmar and was buried in the local Jewish cemetery.

Józef Kowner's oeuvre includes portraits, landscapes, maritime motifs, still lifes and symbolic compositions, as well as architectural paintings of Łódź, created in oil and watercolor. Kowner's work is included in the collections of the City of Łódź Museum, Łódź Art Museum, Vilnius Museum, the Museum of Modern Art in Stockholm, and the Kalmar Art Museum.
