= Czysta Dębina-Kolonia =

- Village
- Location within Poland
- Coordinates: 50°56′00″N 22°57′21″E
- Country: Poland
- Voivodeship: Lublin
- County: Krasnystaw
- Gmina: Gorzków

Czysta Dębina-Kolonia [ˈt͡ʂɨsta dɛmˈbʲina kɔˈlɔɲa] is a village in the administrative district of Gmina Gorzków, within Krasnystaw County, Lublin Voivodeship, in eastern Poland.
