= Tadeusz Pruszkowski =

Polish painter (1888–1942)

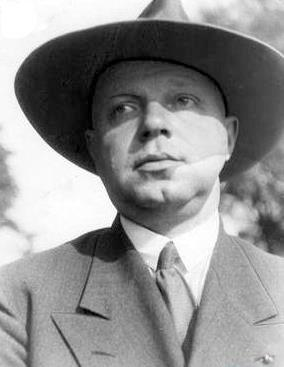
- Tadeusz Pruszkowski (1930s)
- Born: 15 April 1888; Borucice, Congress Poland, Russian Empire (Poland)
- Died: 30 June 1942 (aged 54); Warsaw, Poland
- Known for: Painting

Tadeusz Pruszkowski (15 April 1888 – 30 June 1942) was a Polish painter and art teacher, known primarily for his portraits.

== Biography ==
He began his artistic studies in 1904 at the School of Fine Arts in Warsaw, under Konrad Krzyżanowski. In 1908, he continued his studies in Paris, where he associated with Polish writers and artists belonging to the Royalist Club, a monarchist organization. He also met his future wife there. After graduating, he travelled to Switzerland and Algeria, returning to Poland in 1911 and helping to create an artists' society known as "Young Art" (Młoda Sztuka). In 1914, he held his first solo exhibition at the "Society for the Appreciation of Fine Arts".

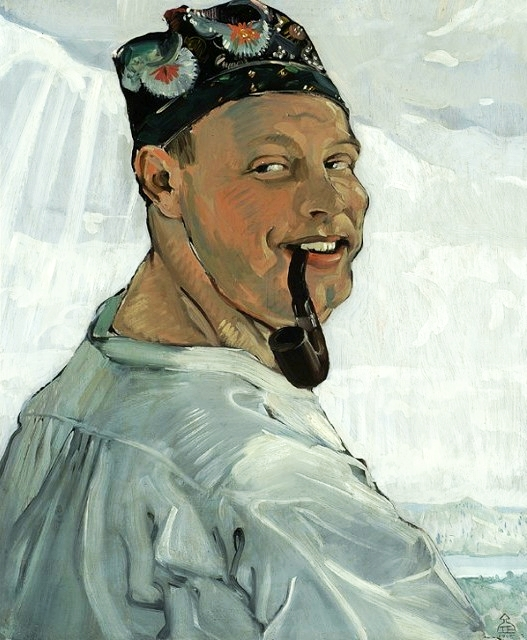
Self-portrait with Pipe (1915)

In 1915, all the members of Young Art joined the Polish Legion and the organization's funds were used to provide them with equipment. Pruszkowski adopted the name "Rdza" (rust), was assigned to a unit led by Captain Władysław Belina-Prażmowski and served with a Regiment of Uhlans. During a stay in Volhynia he created numerous portraits of the officers and soldiers which were shown at an exhibition in the Zachęta. In 1917, he became a member of the Reserves and later earned a pilot's license; becoming a lifelong enthusiast for air racing.

In 1922, following the death of Krzyżanowski, he was named a Professor at the School of Fine Arts. He took his students to paint en plein aire in Kazimierz Dolny, where he later built a villa, and his classes were very popular. One of his students was Caziel. He continued to participate in numerous exhibitions, both as exhibitor and organizer. In 1926 he directed a short comedy written by Feliks Topolski called Szczęśliwy wisielec, czyli Kalifornia w Polsce (The Happy Hangman, or California in Poland). One of the "stars" was the painter Janina Konarska.

In 1930, he became Rector at the School of Fine Arts; participating in the process that resulted in school being promoted to the Academy of Fine Arts in 1932. During the following years, he was involved in creating several organizations for the promotion of Polish art and wrote essays for various publications. In 1935, he was awarded the "Golden Laurel" of the Polish Academy of Literature. His awards included the Cross of Independence, the Order of Polonia Restituta and the Cross of Merit.

At the outbreak of World War II, he and his wife moved from Kazimierz Dolny to a small apartment in Warsaw and rarely ventured outside. He was arrested in June 1942, for aiding Jews and taken to Gestapo headquarters (later the Mausoleum of Struggle and Martyrdom). After interrogation, he and another prisoner being transferred to Pawiak Prison attempted to escape, were shot, and killed. They were buried by people from the nearby Warsaw Ghetto. After the war, his remains were recovered and interred in Powązki Cemetery.

== Selected paintings ==
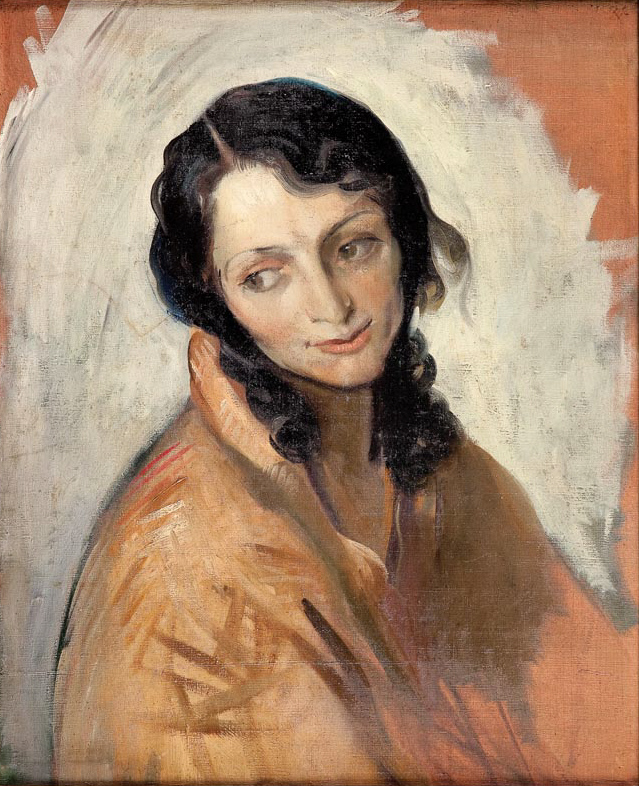
Portrait of a
Young Woman

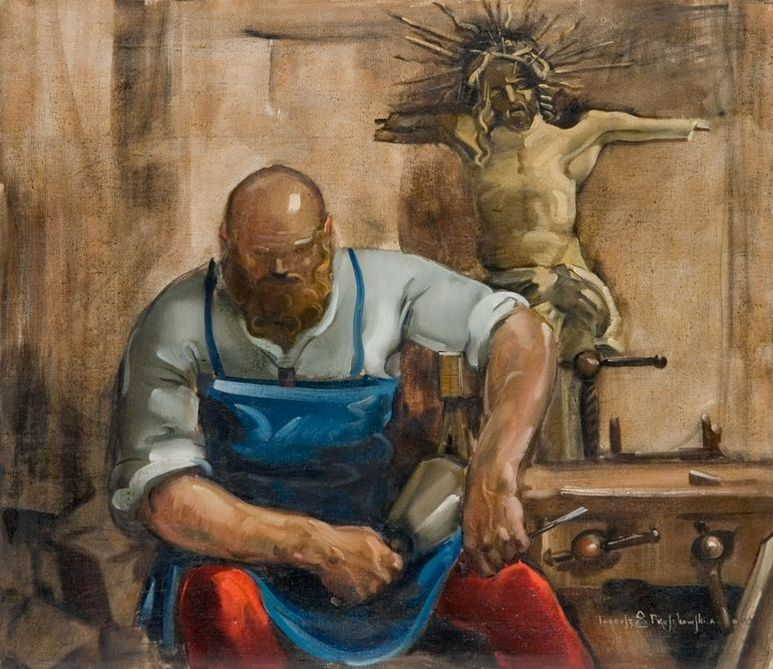
Wit Stwosz

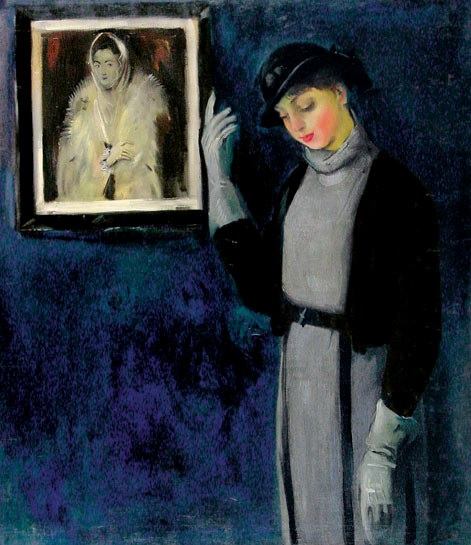
Portrait of a
Young Painter

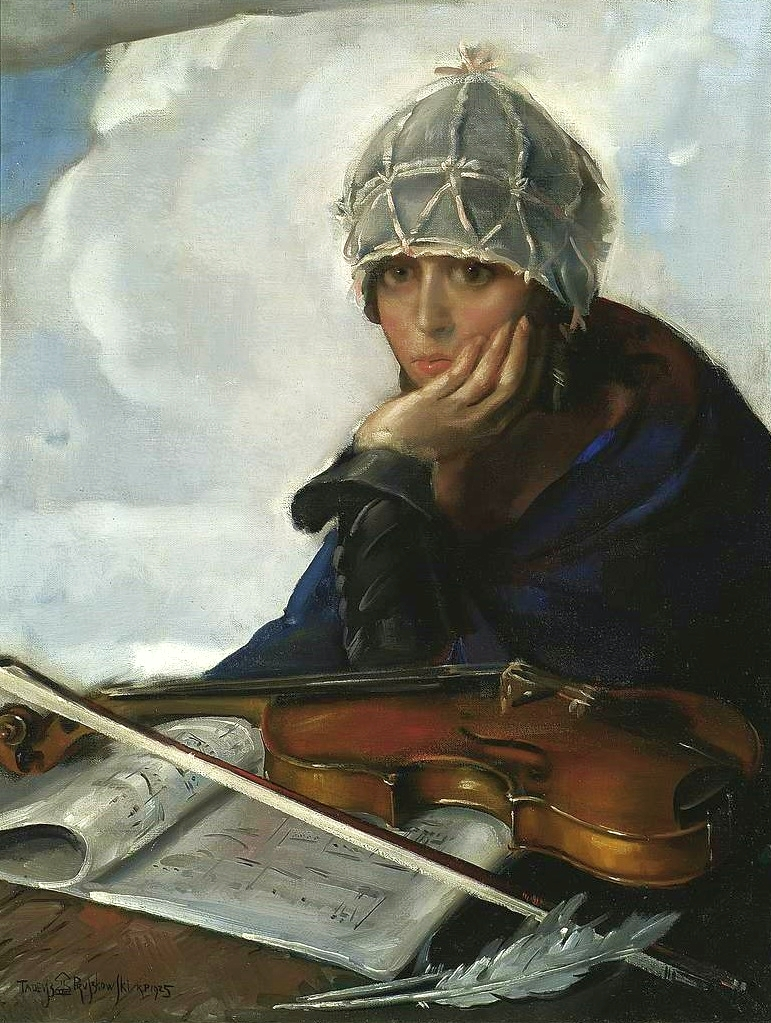
Melancholia

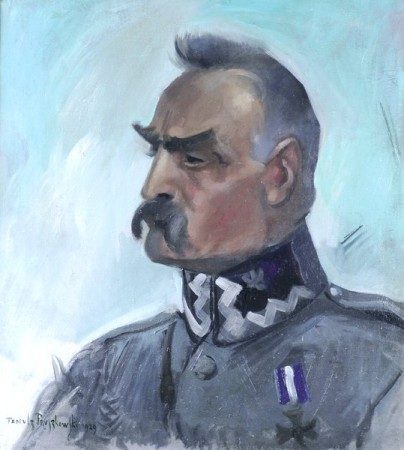
Józef Piłsudski
