= Church of the Intercession of the Theotokos, Bończa =

Orthodox church in Bończa, Poland

Church of the Intercession of the Theotokos
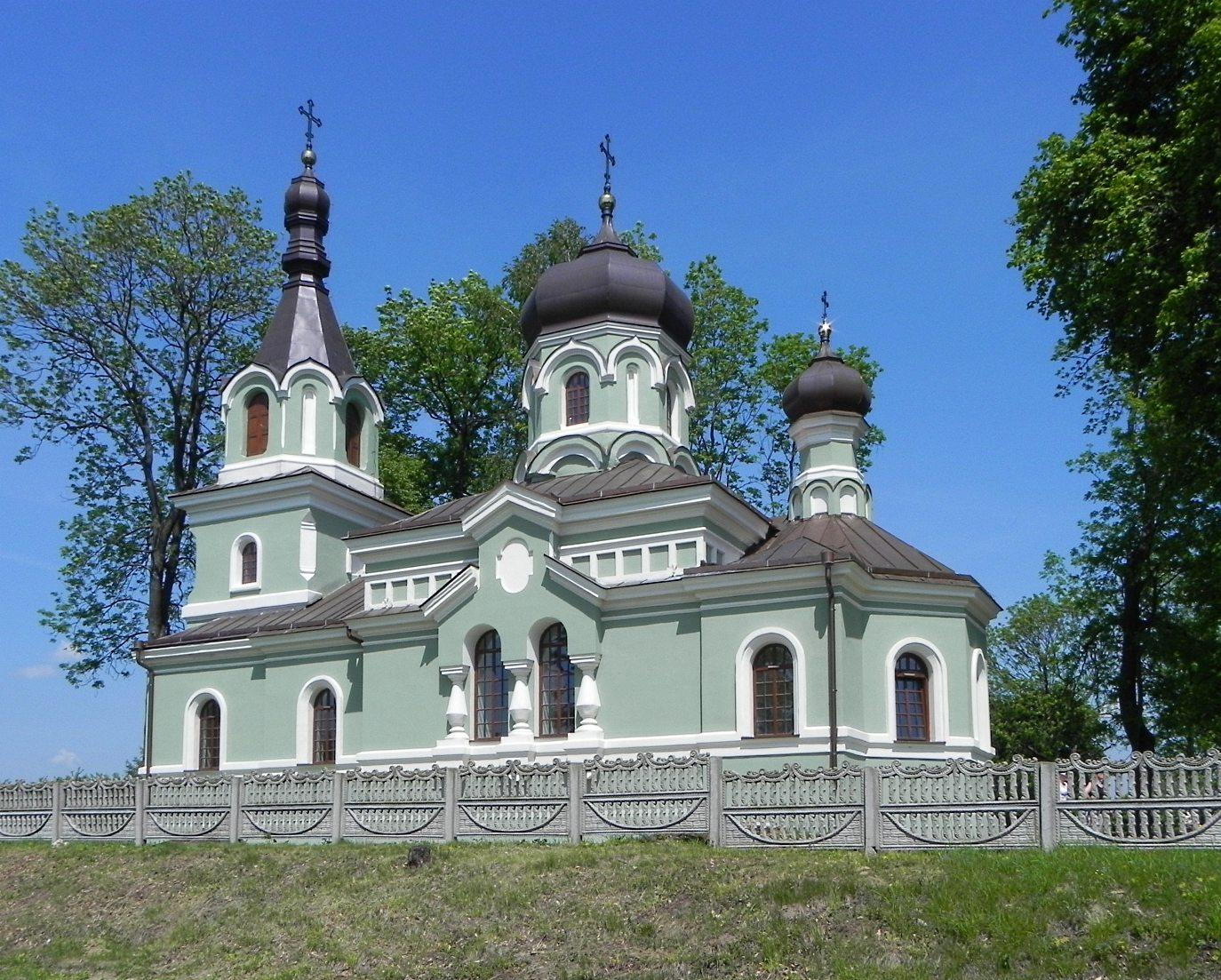
- Church of the Intercession of the Theotokos
- 50°55′59.8″N 23°25′13.8″E
- Location: Bończa
- Country: Poland
- Denomination: Eastern Orthodoxy
- Churchmanship: Polish Orthodox Church

History
- Status: active Orthodox church
- Dedication: Intercession of the Theotokos
- Dedicated: 1881

Architecture
- Style: Russian Revival
- Completed: 1881

Specifications
- Materials: brick

Administration
- Diocese: Diocese of Lublin and Chełm

The Church of the Intercession of the Theotokos is an Orthodox church and parish church located in Bończa, Poland. It belongs to the Zamość Deanery of the Diocese of Lublin and Chełm within the Polish Orthodox Church.

The church is situated outside the village's residential area, on a hill along the Krasnystaw–Uchanie–Hrubieszów road.

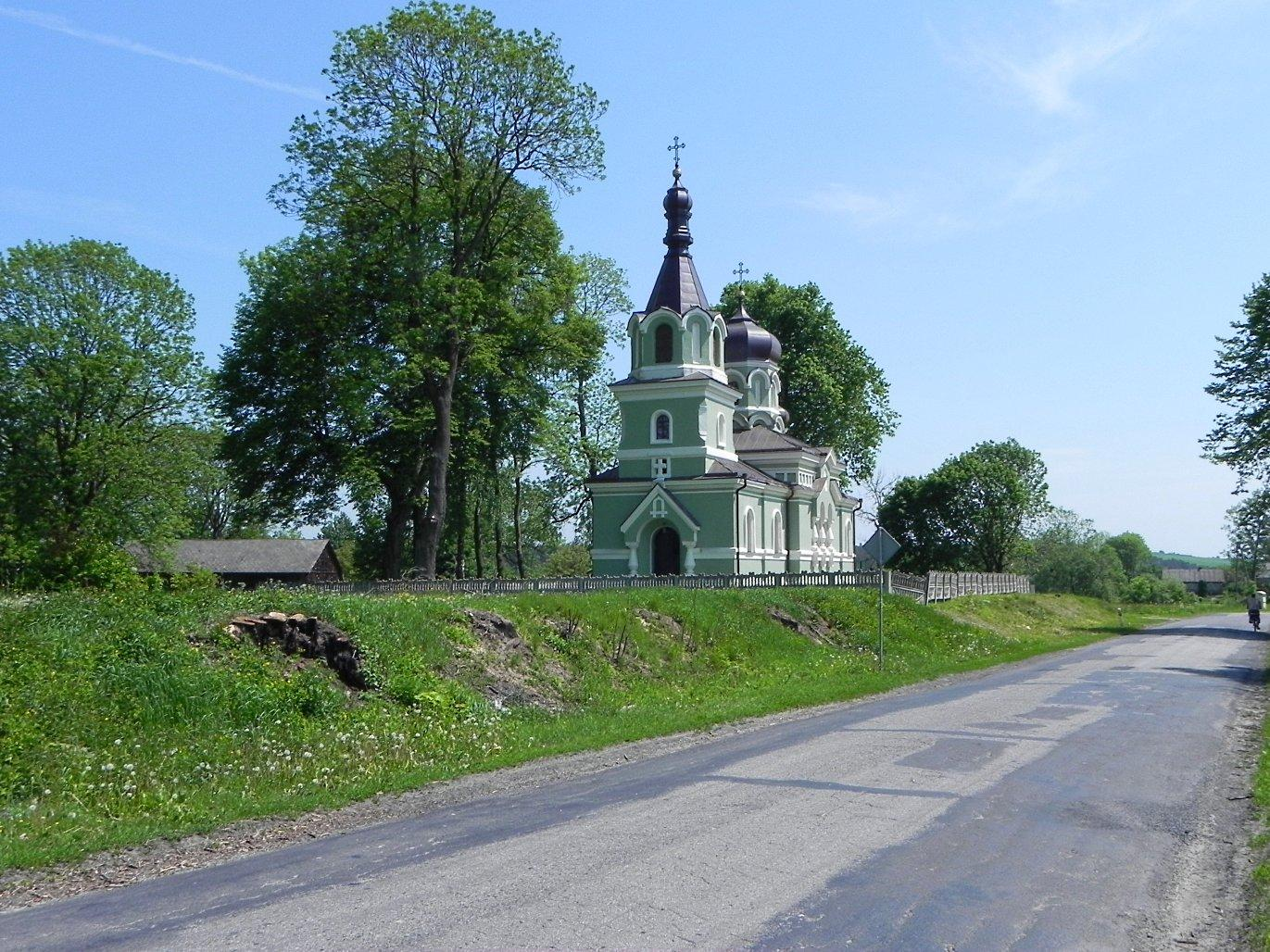
General view of the church

The earliest records of an Orthodox parish church in Bończa date to 1489. In the 17th century, the parish adopted the Union of Brest, becoming Greek Catholic. A new Greek Catholic church was built in Bończa in 1724. In 1875, following the Conversion of Chełm Eparchy, the church was transferred to the Russian Orthodox Church. Six years later, a new church was constructed in the Moscow-Yaroslavl style, a variant of the prevailing Russian Revival style in sacred architecture. The church remained active until 1915, when the local Orthodox population was evacuated deep into Russia. It reopened as a parish church in 1922 or 1923 but was closed again after World War II due to the deportation of the Ukrainian Orthodox population, halting parish activities. The Ministry of Religious Affairs permitted its reopening for worship in 1956, though the small congregation prevented regular services until 2007. The building underwent a major renovation at the turn of the 20th and 21st centuries.

== History ==
=== Early churches in Bończa ===
The oldest written references to an Orthodox church in Bończa date to 1489. Additional records from 1506 and 1531 mention a wooden church established by royal endowment. In 1596, Dionysius Zbyruyskyy, the last Orthodox Bishop of Chełm under the Ecumenical Patriarchate of Constantinople, joined the Greek Catholic Church, a decision extended to his entire jurisdiction. However, not all parishes accepted this shift. The fate of the Bończa parish during the subsequent rivalry between Orthodox and Greek Catholics in the Chełm Land is poorly documented. It is known that, like the nearby church in Krupe, Bończa's church remained Orthodox for decades after the union, facing attacks from Roman Catholic clergy in Lublin. Some sources suggest the parish ceased functioning entirely after 1636, leaving only a Latin-rite parish in the village, though Grzegorz Jacek Pelica considers this unlikely without specifying the church's history between the 16th and 18th centuries.

In 1724, the local landowner, Suchodolski, built a new wooden church in Bończa, which served the Greek Catholic community. By 1872, it had approximately 600 parishioners. In 1875, following the Conversion of Chełm Eparchy, the church was transferred to the Russian Orthodox Church.

=== Construction and operation of the new church ===
Between 1878 and 1881, a new brick church was erected in Bończa, funded by the state treasury as part of a program to build new sacred structures. By 1898, it served 1,048 faithful as a parish church. The building was renovated in 1912. Three years later, in 1915, it was abandoned when the entire Orthodox population, including the parson and his family, fled during the mass exile.

In the years following World War I and Poland's regained independence, the church remained closed. It was neither listed among Orthodox churches slated for reopening by the Ministry of Religious Affairs and Public Education in 1919 nor among the 30 actually reopened in 1921. Unlike over 20 similar churches in nearby areas, it was not reclaimed for the Roman Catholic Church. By 1923, it had resumed functioning as a parish church, one of 15 Orthodox parishes in the Chełm Deanery of the Diocese of Warsaw and Chełm, with the church in Krupe as its filial church. These were the only active Orthodox churches in Krasnystaw County. The reopening was facilitated by Chełm Dean Father Olimpij Denisiewicz, Father Włodzimierz Matwiejczuk, and Father Lt. Col. Józef Dyńko-Nikolski. In 1928, parish membership was estimated at 3,179, though police records reported 3,090 attendees across Bończa and Krupe. Bishop Sawa Sowietow visited the church in September 1932 during a canonical inspection.

The church remained operational during World War II, serving over 450 parishioners. In 1945 or 1946, the parson and 70% of the congregation relocated to the USSR. The remaining faithful were deported during Operation Vistula, leading to the church's closure. Though abandoned, it avoided vandalism, and its furnishings survived. In 1954, Father Aleksy Baranow advocated for its reopening after discovering about 700 Orthodox residents remained in the area. Supported by Metropolitan of Warsaw and all Poland Macarius Oksiyuk, he secured approval from the Ministry of Religious Affairs in mid-1956 despite initial resistance. Regular services resumed in 1958 but became sporadic between 1974 and 1989, conducted by priests from the Saint John the Theologian Parish in Chełm. Another source suggests a permanent administrator served from 1956 to 1989, with services later supported by clergy from Lublin, Chełm, or Hrubieszów until a full-time priest returned in 2007. An arson attempt occurred in 1965. Between 1968 and 1970, estimates of Orthodox residents ranged from 136 to 292, though most attended the local Saint Stanislaus Church due to migration to Lublin, Chełm, and Krasnystaw, and pressure from the Catholic majority.

Through the efforts of Archbishop of Lublin and Chełm Abel, the church underwent a major renovation in the last decade of the 20th century. Conservation work continued until 2007, including the restoration of its icons.

== Architecture ==
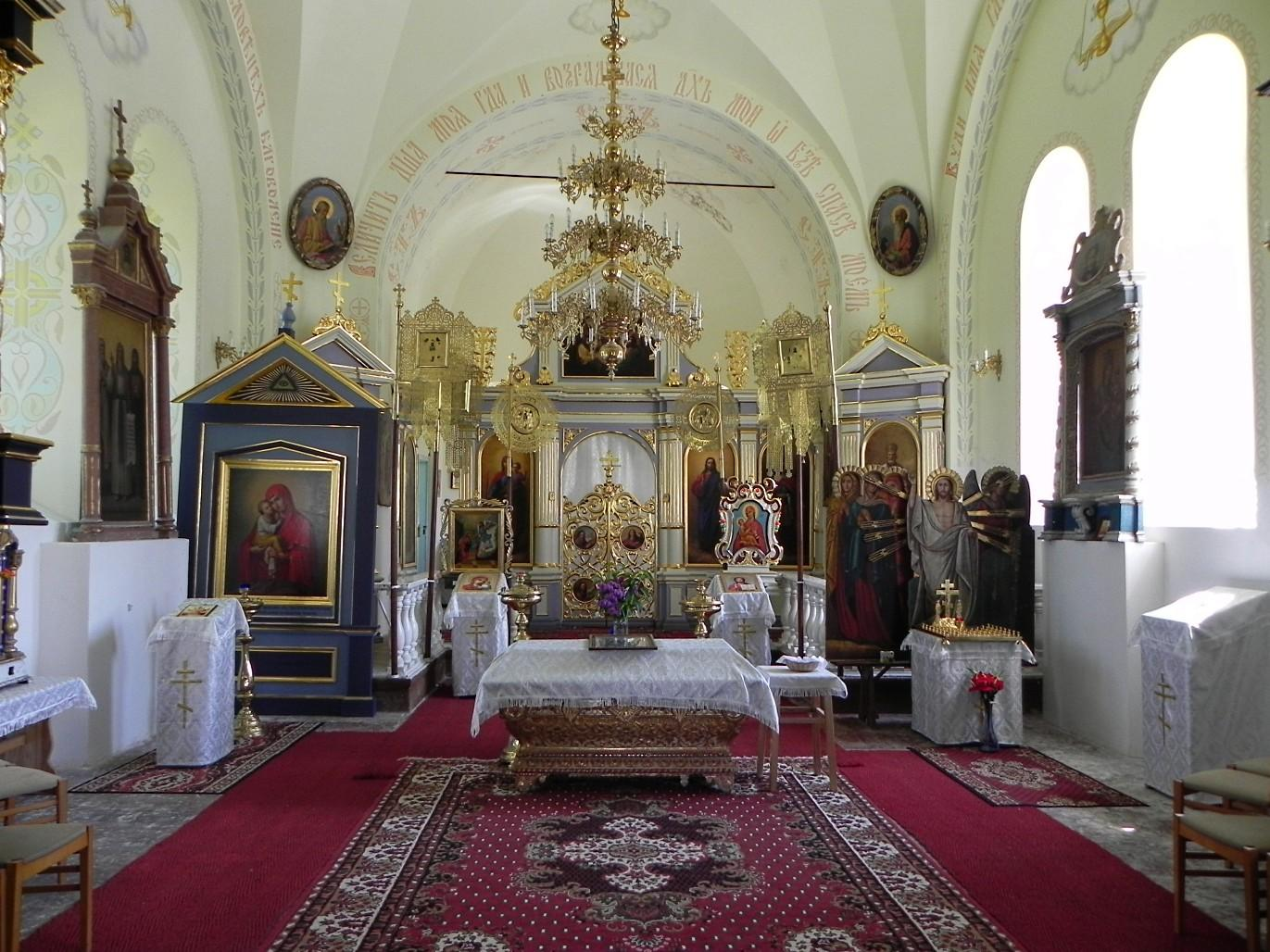
Church interior

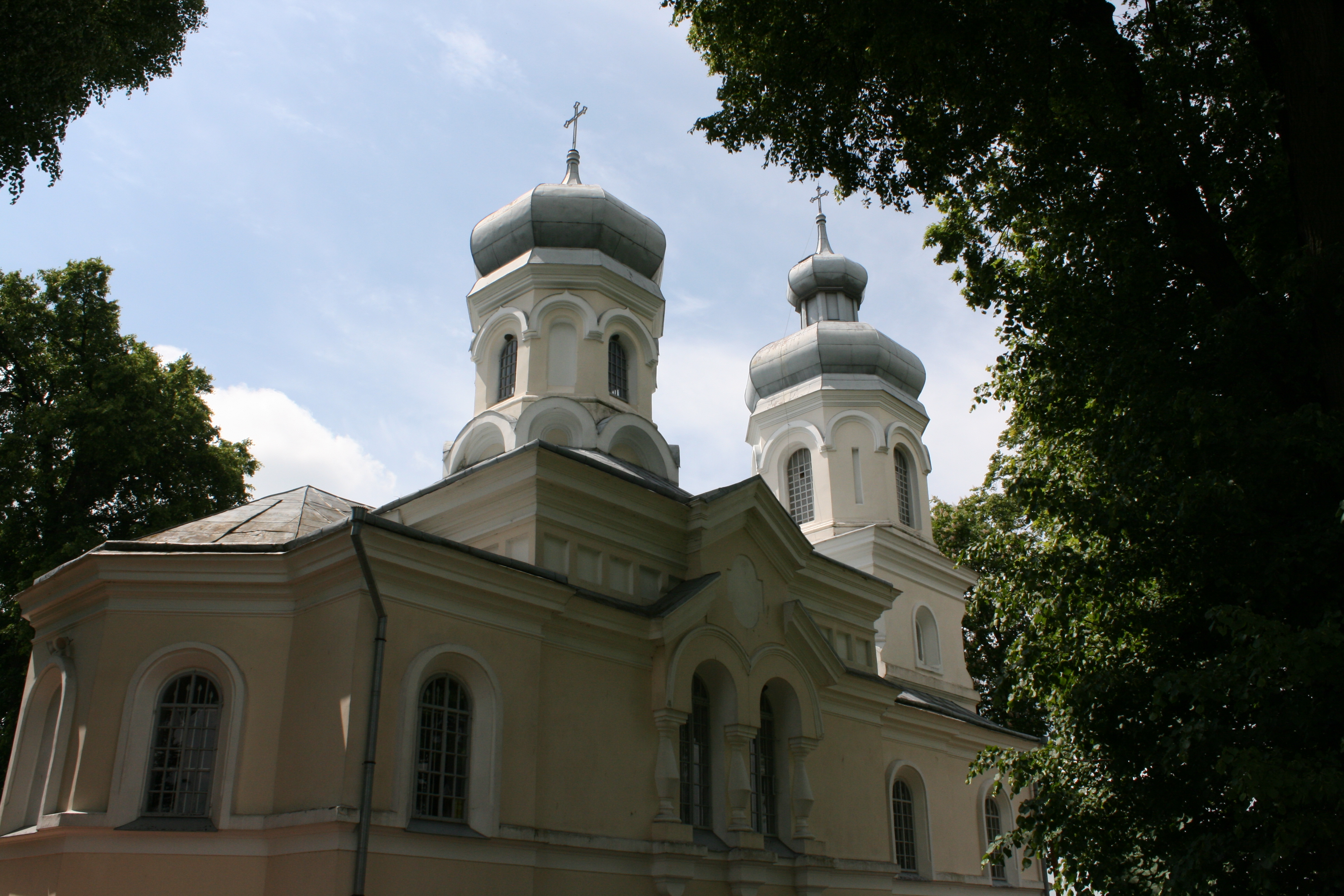
Saint Stanislaus Bishop Church in Teratyn, originally an Orthodox church, built from the same design as the Bończa church

The church exemplifies the Russian Revival style, specifically emulating 17th- and 18th-century Moscow architecture (Moscow-Yaroslavl style). It is a tripartite structure featuring a bell tower topped with a tent roof and a small onion-shaped dome over the church porch, a single square nave with a large onion dome, and a smaller tripartite chancel under a smaller dome. To enhance its Moscow-style resemblance, white kokoshnik-shaped arches adorn the windows of the main dome's drum and bell tower, while archivolts over doors and windows rest on white columns. The chancel has a polygonal closure.

The Bończa church is not architecturally unique. The same design was used for churches in Gnojno, Babice, Teratyn, Kalinówka, and Horyszów Ruski, all completed between 1881 and 1883, with Bończa among the earliest. Building identical churches across different locations was a common practice in late Russian Empire sacred architecture. Its decorative Moscow-style details were elaborated further in the Dormition of the Virgin Mary Church in Hrubieszów. These churches were among the first Orthodox structures in Congress Poland built in the Moscow-Yaroslavl style, diverging from designs by Konstantin Thon.

The interior retains 17th- and 18th-century furnishings, including icons from that period. The iconostasis is single-tiered.

The church was added to the register of historic monuments on 2 December 2004 under number A/281.
