= Chełmiec =

Chełmiec may refer to:

- Chełmiec, Lower Silesian Voivodeship (south-west Poland)
- Chełmiec, Lublin Voivodeship (east Poland)
- Chełmiec, Lesser Poland Voivodeship (south Poland)
- Chełmiec, Warmian-Masurian Voivodeship (north Poland)
- Chełmiec (mount) (south-west Poland)
