= St. Michael the Archangel's Church, Kulno =

Orthodox and Catholic church in Kulno, Poland

St. Michael the Archangel's Church
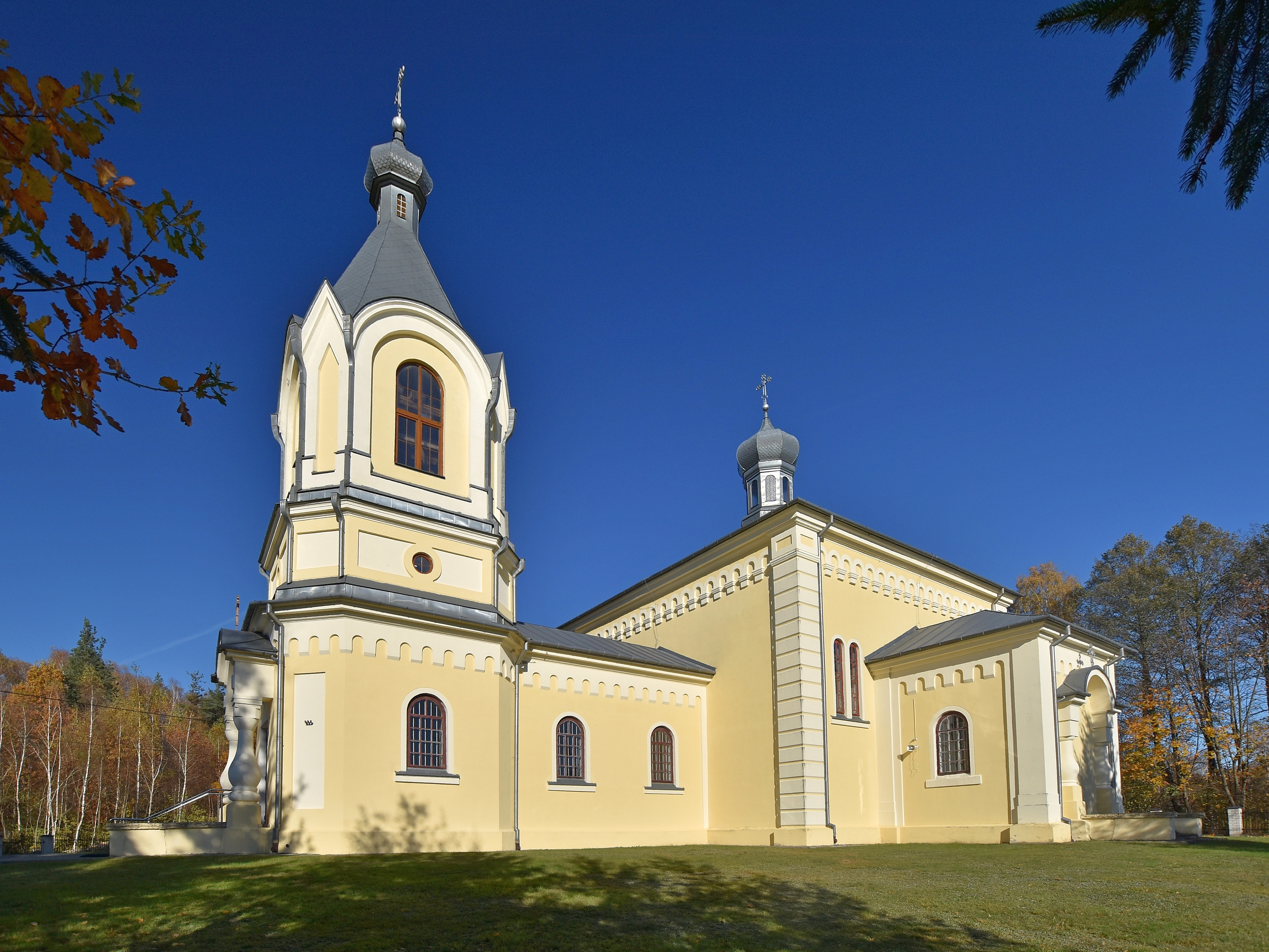
- St. Michael the Archangel's Church
- 50°20′07.1″N 22°29′20.5″E
- Location: Kulno
- Country: Poland
- Denomination: Eastern Orthodoxy; Catholicism
- Previous denomination: Uniate
- Churchmanship: Polish Orthodox Church; Latin Church

History
- Status: active Orthodox and Catholic church
- Dedication: Saint Michael the Archangel; Maximilian Kolbe

Architecture
- Style: Russian Revival
- Completed: 1827

Specifications
- Materials: brick

Administration
- Diocese: Diocese of Lublin and Chełm; Diocese of Zamość–Lubaczów

St. Michael the Archangel's Church, or St. Maximilian Kolbe's Church, is a religious building in Kulno, jointly used by the Orthodox Parish of the Holy Trinity in Tarnogród, within the Zamość Deanery of the Diocese of Lublin and Chełm of the Polish Orthodox Church, and the Parish of St. Andrew Bobola in Bystre, within the Biłgoraj-Południe Deanery of the Roman Catholic Diocese of Zamość–Lubaczów.

An Orthodox parish existed in Kulno before the 17th century and adopted the Union of Brest no later than 1691. The present church was built in the 19th century in the official Russian Revival style. In 1875, the Kulno parish was forcibly incorporated into the Orthodox Eparchy of Warsaw along with the entire Uniate Chełm Eparchy. During the interwar period, the church in Kulno remained active. However, the local parish ceased functioning in 1946, following the resettlement of the Ukrainian Orthodox population to the Soviet Union. Orthodox clergy from Tarnogród attempted to revive liturgical life in Kulno, but the few remaining believers were afraid to participate in services due to fear of the Catholic majority in the village. For several years, the church was effectively abandoned and gradually fell into disrepair. In 1955 or 1956, it was reopened as a filial church of the Tarnogród parish.

Since 1972, the building has been jointly used by both the Orthodox and Roman Catholic parishes (it is the only such religious structure in eastern Poland). Its interior features furnishings typical of Catholic churches, as the original Orthodox liturgical items were transferred in the 1950s to a newly established Orthodox church in Malczyce.

== History ==
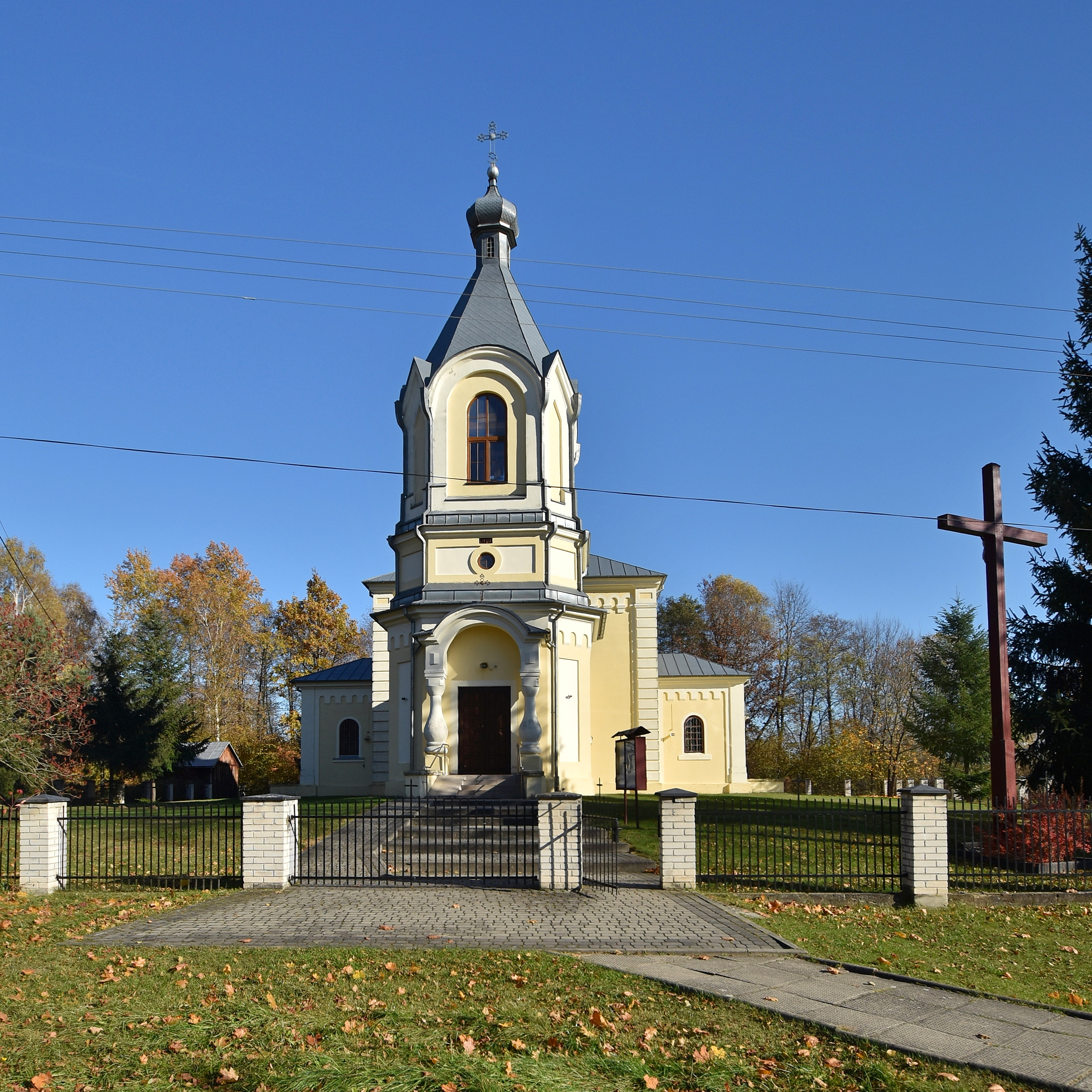
Front elevation

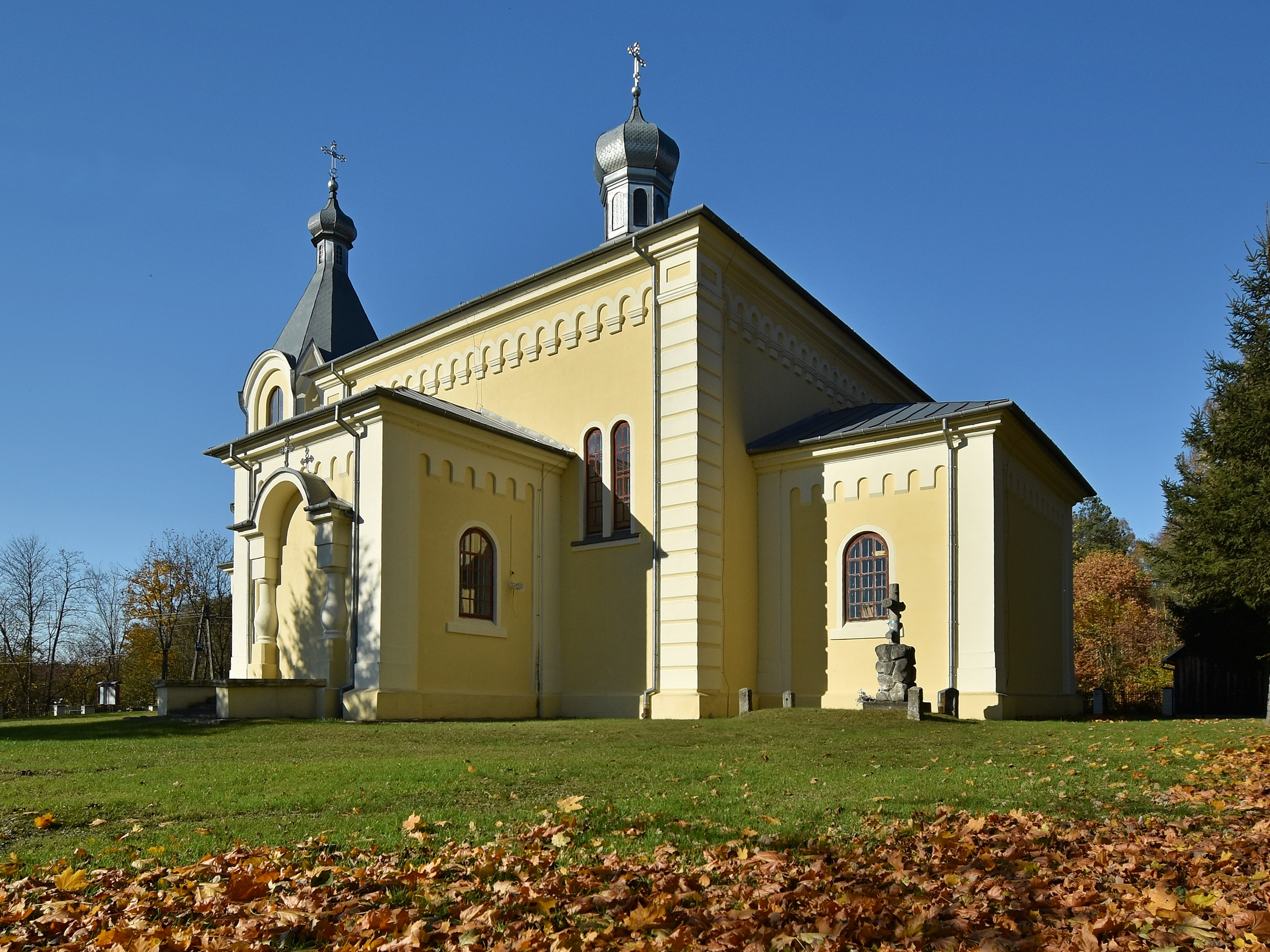
Side elevation

An Orthodox parish in Kulno existed under the jurisdiction of the Eparchy of Przemyśl and Sambir. It did not immediately adopt the Union of Brest upon its establishment and remained Orthodox throughout the 17th century. It may have converted no later than 1691 when the last Orthodox Bishop of Przemyśl, Innocenty, changed his confession.

The first two Uniate churches in Kulno were wooden structures, located at the site of today's forester's lodge in the village. The present church is the third sacred building of this denomination and the first brick Orthodox church in Kulno. It was built in 1827 and dedicated two years later. This construction date is recorded in the register of historic monuments. However, other sources suggest that the church was built after the suppression of the January Uprising as part of a broader Russian campaign to construct brick churches in the Russian Revival style for Uniate parishes in the Chełm Land, specifically in 1872.

The theory that the church was built in 1872 is indirectly supported by art historian Piotr Krasny, who points out that the church was modeled after designs presented in Projekty cerkwiej by Konstantin Thon. This work was published only in 1838, and from 1841 onward, the designs it contained were officially recognized as standard templates for newly built Orthodox churches throughout the Russian Empire.

In 1875, the Uniate parish in Kulno was forced to adopt Orthodoxy as part of the Conversion of Chełm Eparchy.

=== Interwar period and World War II ===
After Poland regained independence, the Ministry of Religious Affairs and Public Education included the church in Kulno in its 1919 list of state-supported parish churches in the Lublin Voivodeship. The church was in operation no later than mid-1921. By 1923, it was one of four churches in the Biłgoraj Deanery of the Diocese of Warsaw and Chełm and one of four Orthodox churches in Biłgoraj County. The pastoral station served 610 families, comprising the vast majority of Kulno's population.

Under the Orthodox Church in the General Government, the church belonged to the Biłgoraj Deanery of the Diocese of Chełm and Podlachia.

On 14 January 1944, during the Divine Liturgy, the church was surrounded by a Polish partisan unit led by Franciszek Przysiężniak, codenamed Ojciec Jan. The approximately 60 Ukrainians gathered inside were stripped of money and various belongings. According to another source, the "operation against the church in Kulno", during which the local population had their clothing taken and redistributed to partisans, was carried out by a National Armed Forces unit under the command of Wacław Piotrowski, codenamed Cichy.

=== After World War II ===
The Orthodox parish ceased to operate after the resettlement of the local population of that faith to the Soviet Union in 1946. In 1953, the Polish Orthodox Church agreed to transfer the church in Kulno to the Roman Catholic parish, along with churches in Teratyn, Łaziska, and Syczyn. In reality, the church was abandoned and gradually deteriorated: the roof and ceiling were destroyed, trees grew on the walls, windows and doors were broken, and the fence surrounding the church grounds was damaged.

In 1955, Father Michał Kalin, serving in Tarnogród, informed Metropolitan Macarius of Warsaw and all Poland about the cutting of trees around the church and the destruction of the Orthodox cemetery. A similar report was given that year by Father Aleksy Baranow to Metropolitan Macarius, stating that the church in Kulno, like other churches abandoned after the deportation of Orthodox Ukrainians, was being systematically destroyed. After the resettlements, 93 Orthodox people remained in Kulno. They hid their religious affiliation from the predominantly Catholic population and feared that participation in services (which a priest from Tarnogród was willing to conduct) would worsen relations with their neighbors. As a result, services in the Kulno church were only held on major holidays and were sometimes canceled because the faithful did not provide a cart for the priest to travel to Kulno, as well as to the nearby villages of Potok Górny and Babice, where similar sentiments prevailed.

According to the Catholic Diocese of Zamość–Lubaczów, in 1956, the Parish of the Holy Trinity in Tarnogród was restored, and the church in Kulno was opened as its filial station. According to historian Jacek Wysocki, the church in Kulno was already in use a year earlier and became once again the parish church, with 150 members.

In the 1960s and 1970s, thanks to the efforts of Father Grzegorz Misijuk from the Orthodox parish in Tarnogród, part of the church's furnishings were salvaged. The iconostasis and much of the liturgical utensils from the Kulno church had already been transported earlier to the church in Malczyce, established in the early 1950s.

Since 1972, based on an agreement between Metropolitan Bazyli of Warsaw and all Poland and Roman Catholic Bishop Piotr Kałwa of Lublin, the church in Kulno has been jointly used by Catholics and Orthodox. It is the only such sacred building in eastern Poland maintained jointly by members of the two churches. The cemetery in Kulno also has a bi-confessional character. After agreeing on the principles of shared use, the Catholic community renovated the dilapidated building, constructed a new fence, and in 1999, interior renovations were carried out (new benches, doors, and flooring). The church's furnishings have been continually supplemented with Catholic liturgical utensils. Orthodox services are held in the church once a month from spring to autumn, and in winter, on major holidays.

The church was listed in the register of historic monuments on 27 September 2004 under number A-101.

== Architecture ==
The church represents the Russian Revival style. Its design was created by Aleksandr Puring, who based it on a model published in the collection Projekty cerkwiej. The church in Kulno is a smooth-plastered structure, with the only decoration on its facade being a series of small arcades and a portal with sculpted columns and kokoshniks, inspired by Russian sacred architecture. The church is a single-nave, three-part building, with the nave built on a square plan and a chancel that is polygonally closed. The church bell tower rises above the church porch and is topped by a tent-like roof crowned with a small onion dome. A similarly crowned roof lantern is located above the nave. A lower sacristy is attached to the building.

The original furnishings of the church are mostly located in the church in Malczyce. The Kulno church retains several historic elements, including 18th-century royal doors, icons of the Virgin Mary and Christ Pantocrator from the 17th/18th centuries, an icon of Saint Onuphrius from the 18th century, and an altar with an icon of Saint Michael the Archangel.
