= Wólka Kraśniczyńska =

- Village
- Location within Poland
- Coordinates: 50°56′N 23°22′E
- Country: Poland
- Voivodeship: Lublin
- County: Krasnystaw
- Gmina: Kraśniczyn

Wólka Kraśniczyńska [ˈvulka kraɕniˈt͡ʂɨɲska] is a village in the administrative district of Gmina Kraśniczyn, within Krasnystaw County, Lublin Voivodeship, in eastern Poland.

Wólka Kraśniczyńska lies on the Wojsławka River's banks. As of the 2021 census, the population stood at approximately 409 inhabitants, with women accounting for 57.9% of the total. The village's postal code is 22‑310 and uses the telephone area code 82.

== Places of interest ==
One of the local landmarks is the small Orthodox cemetery church dedicated to the Dormition of the Mother of God (Zaśnięcia Przenajświętszej Bogurodzicy), built in 2006 as a filial chapel of the parish in Bończa.

The nearby Wojsławka stream offers a modest natural setting characteristic of the gently undulating Lublin Upland. Although Wólka Kraśniczyńska itself lacks large tourist facilities, its location within Gmina Kraśniczyn places it close to several points of interest: the Skierbieszowski Landscape Park extends into the area, and the nearby "Głęboka Dolina" nature reserve protects unique valley woods and old-growth trees. This setting makes the village a quiet base for exploring the rural landscapes and ecological features of the region.
