= Majdan Surhowski =

- Village
- Location within Poland
- Coordinates: 50°56′N 23°19′E
- Country: Poland
- Voivodeship: Lublin
- County: Krasnystaw
- Gmina: Kraśniczyn

Majdan Surhowski (Polish pronunciation: [ˈmajdan surˈxɔfskʲi]) is a village in the administrative district of Gmina Kraśniczyn, within Krasnystaw County, Lublin Voivodeship, in eastern Poland.
