= Wolica, Krasnystaw County =

Wolica
- Village
- Location within Poland
- Coordinates: 50°56′35″N 23°22′21″E
- Country: Poland
- Voivodeship: Lublin
- County: Krasnystaw
- Gmina: Kraśniczyn
- Population: 140

Wolica [vɔˈlit͡sa] is a village in the administrative district of Gmina Kraśniczyn, within Krasnystaw County, Lublin Voivodeship, in eastern Poland.

In 2005 the village had a population of 140.
