= Zalesie, Gmina Kraśniczyn =

Zalesie
- Village
- Location within Poland
- Coordinates: 50°53′55″N 23°24′10″E
- Country: Poland
- Voivodeship: Lublin
- County: Krasnystaw
- Gmina: Kraśniczyn

Zalesie [zaˈlɛɕɛ] is a village in the administrative district of Gmina Kraśniczyn, within Krasnystaw County, Lublin Voivodeship, in eastern Poland.
