= Wysokie Pierwsze =

- Village
- Location within Poland
- Coordinates: 50°51′59″N 23°26′11″E
- Country: Poland
- Voivodeship: Lublin
- County: Zamość
- Gmina: Skierbieszów

Wysokie Pierwsze [vɨˈsɔkʲɛ ˈpjɛrfʂɛ] is a village in the administrative district of Gmina Skierbieszów, within Zamość County, Lublin Voivodeship, in eastern Poland.
