= Olszanka, Gmina Kraśniczyn =

Olszanka
- Village
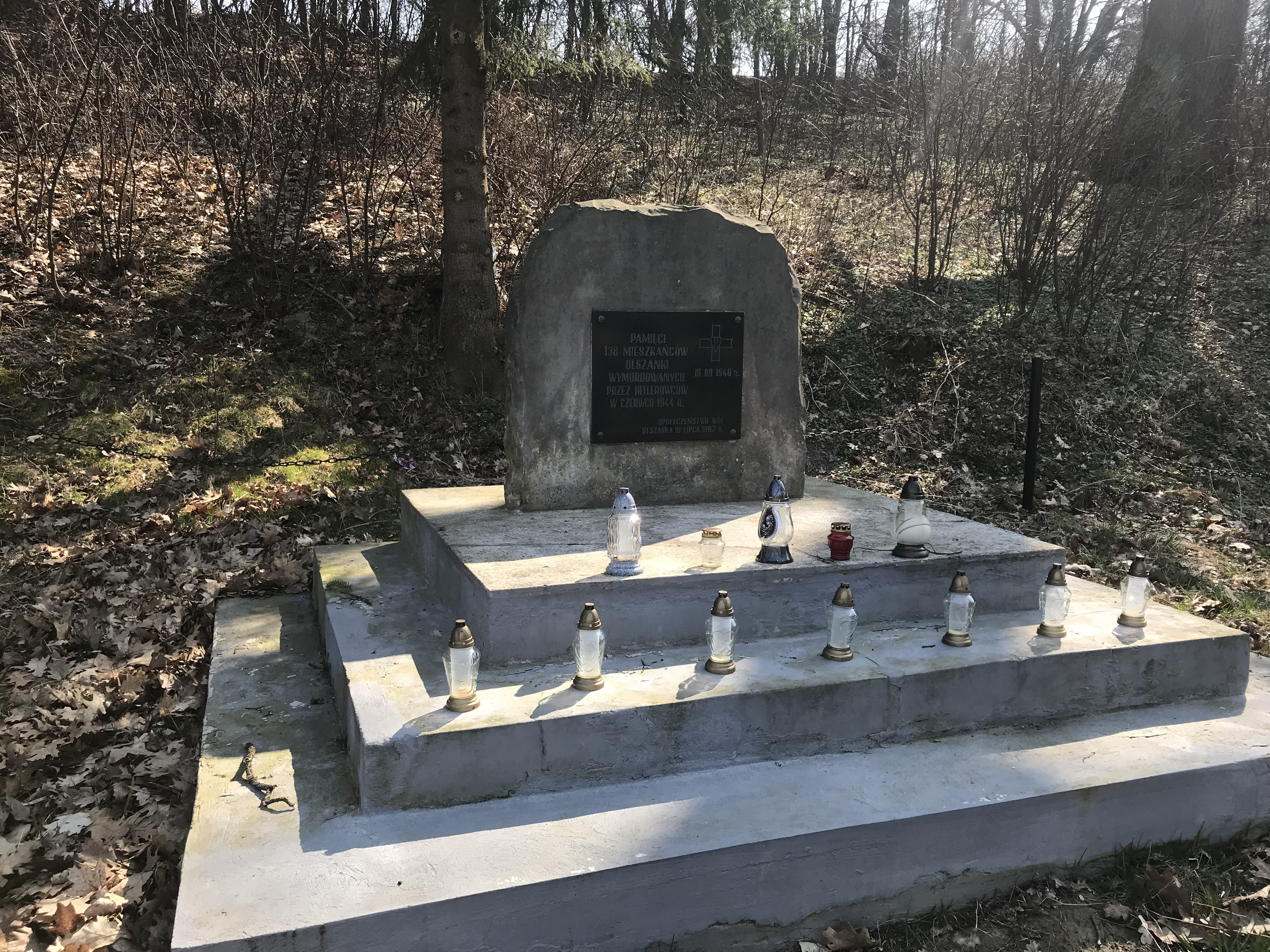
- Memorial to the victims of the German-perpetrated Olszanka massacre of 1944

- Location within Poland
- Coordinates: 50°53′44″N 23°28′11″E
- Country: Poland
- Voivodeship: Lublin
- County: Krasnystaw
- Gmina: Kraśniczyn
- Time zone: UTC+1 (CET)
  - Summer (DST): UTC+2 (CEST)
- Vehicle registration: LKS

Olszanka [ɔlˈʂaŋka] is a village in the administrative district of Gmina Kraśniczyn, within Krasnystaw County, Lublin Voivodeship, in eastern Poland.

== History ==
During the German occupation (World War II), on 5 June 1944, the village was pacified by the occupiers. Some 100 Polish men, women and children were massacred in reprisal for their support for the Polish resistance movement. There is a memorial in the village.
