= Huszczka Mała =

- Village
- Location within Poland
- Coordinates: 50°51′N 23°18′E
- Country: Poland
- Voivodeship: Lublin
- County: Zamość
- Gmina: Skierbieszów

Huszczka Mała [ˈxuʂt͡ʂka ˈmawa] is a village in the administrative district of Gmina Skierbieszów.

== Location ==
The village is located within Zamość County, Lublin Voivodeship, in eastern Poland.
