= Gmina Skierbieszów =

Gmina Skierbieszów Skierbieszów Commune
- Gmina
- Coat of arms
- Interactive map of Gmina Skierbieszów
- Coordinates (Skierbieszów): 50°51′N 23°22′E
- Country: Poland
- Voivodeship: Lublin
- County: Zamość County
- Seat: Skierbieszów

Area
  - Total: 139.17 km^{2} (53.73 sq mi)

Population (2013)
  - Total: 5,367
  - Density: 38.56/km^{2} (99.88/sq mi)
- Website: http://www.skierbieszow.lubelskie.pl

Gmina Skierbieszów is a rural gmina (administrative district) in Zamość County, Lublin Voivodeship, in eastern Poland. Its seat is the village of Skierbieszów, which lies approximately 17 kilometres (11 mi) north-east of Zamość and 72 km (45 mi) south-east of the regional capital Lublin.

The gmina covers an area of 139.17 square kilometres (53.7 sq mi), and as of 2006 its total population is 5,604 (5,367 in 2013).

The gmina contains part of the protected area called Skierbieszów Landscape Park.

== Villages ==
Gmina Skierbieszów contains the villages and settlements of Dębowiec, Dębowiec-Kolonia, Drewniki, Hajowniki, Huszczka Duża, Huszczka Mała, Iłowiec, Kalinówka, Łaziska, Majdan Skierbieszowski, Marcinówka, Nowa Lipina, Osiczyna, Podhuszczka, Podwysokie, Sady, Skierbieszów, Skierbieszów-Kolonia, Sławęcin, Stara Lipina, Suchodębie, Sulmice, Szorcówka, Wiszenki, Wiszenki-Kolonia, Wysokie Drugie, Wysokie Pierwsze, Zabytów, Zawoda and Zrąb-Kolonia.

== Neighbouring gminas ==
Gmina Skierbieszów is bordered by the gminas of Grabowiec, Izbica, Kraśniczyn, Sitno, Stary Zamość and Zamość.
