= Podwysokie, Lublin Voivodeship =

Podwysokie
- Village
- Location within Poland
- Coordinates: 50°53′N 23°25′E
- Country: Poland
- Voivodeship: Lublin
- County: Zamość
- Gmina: Skierbieszów
- Time zone: UTC+1 (CET)
  - Summer (DST): UTC+2 (CEST)

Podwysokie [pɔdvɨˈsɔkʲɛ] is a village in the administrative district of Gmina Skierbieszów, within Zamość County, Lublin Voivodeship, in eastern Poland.

== History ==
Eight Polish citizens were murdered by Nazi Germany in the village during World War II.
