= Huszczka Duża =

- Village
- Location within Poland
- Coordinates: 50°50′15″N 23°18′40″E
- Country: Poland
- Voivodeship: Lublin
- County: Zamość
- Gmina: Skierbieszów

Huszczka Duża [ˈxuʂt͡ʂka ˈduʐa] is a village in the administrative district of Gmina Skierbieszów, within Zamość County, Lublin Voivodeship, in eastern Poland.
