= Kulno =

- Village
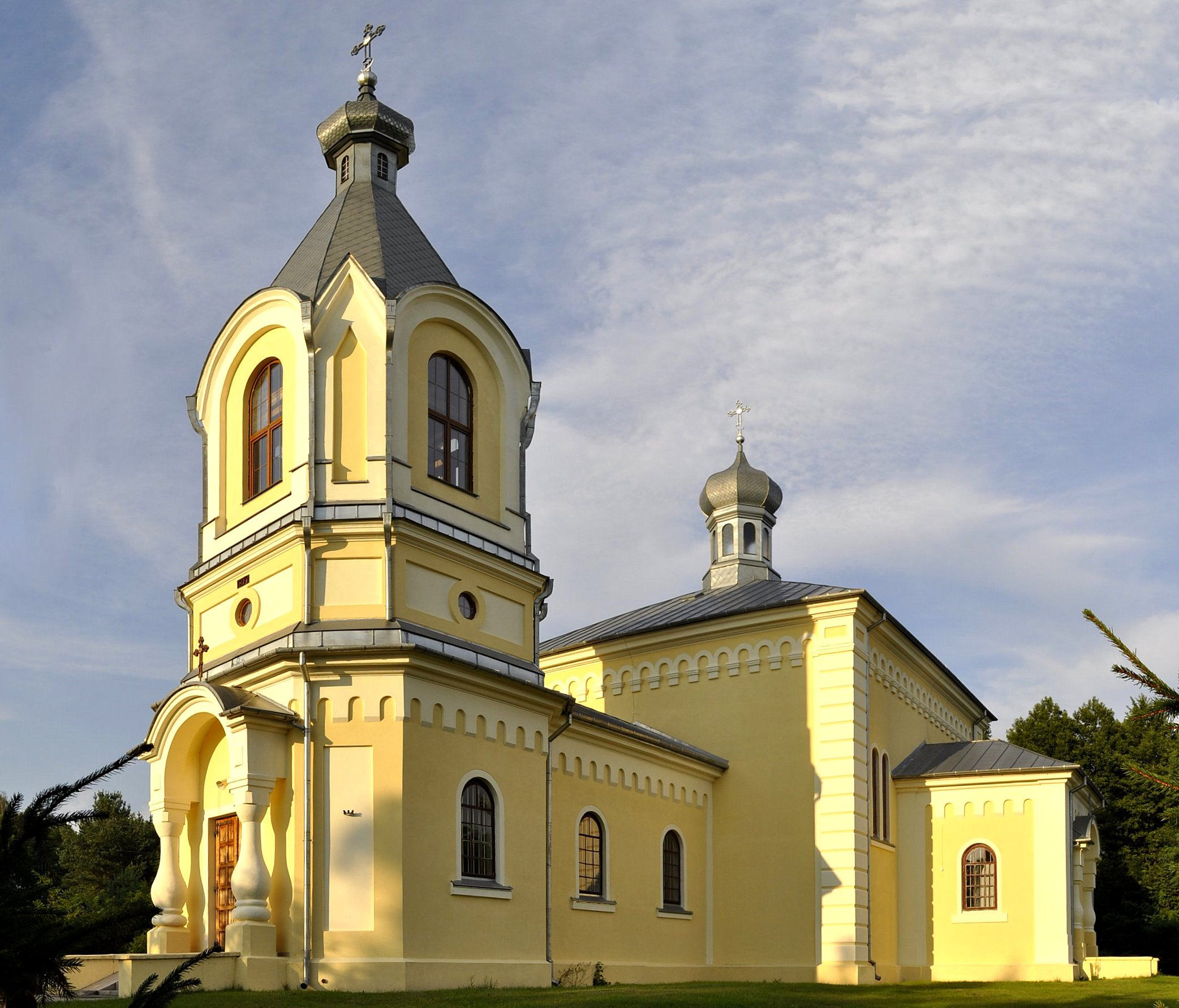
- Saint Michael Archangel Orthodox church in Kulno

- Location within Poland
- Coordinates: 50°20′N 22°29′E
- Country: Poland
- Voivodeship: Subcarpathian
- County: Leżajsk
- Gmina: Kuryłówka
- Population: 600

Kulno [ˈkulnɔ] is a village in the administrative district of Gmina Kuryłówka, within Leżajsk County, Subcarpathian Voivodeship, in south-eastern Poland. The Złota stream flows through the village.
