= Suchodębie, Lublin Voivodeship =

Suchodębie
- Village
- Location within Poland
- Coordinates: 50°48′56″N 23°21′13″E
- Country: Poland
- Voivodeship: Lublin
- County: Zamość
- Gmina: Skierbieszów
- Time zone: UTC+1 (CET)
  - Summer (DST): UTC+2 (CEST)

Suchodębie [suxɔˈdɛmbjɛ] is a village in the administrative district of Gmina Skierbieszów, within Zamość County, Lublin Voivodeship, in eastern Poland.

== History ==
11 Polish citizens were murdered by Nazi Germany in the village during World War II.
