= Bończa-Kolonia =

- Village
- Location within Poland
- Coordinates: 50°56′00″N 23°22′00″E
- Country: Poland
- Voivodeship: Lublin
- County: Krasnystaw
- Gmina: Kraśniczyn

Bończa-Kolonia [ˈbɔɲt͡ʂa kɔˈlɔɲa] is a village in the administrative district of Gmina Kraśniczyn, within Krasnystaw County, Lublin Voivodeship, in eastern Poland.
