= Wiszenki =

- Village
- Location within Poland
- Coordinates: 50°54′N 23°18′E
- Country: Poland
- Voivodeship: Lublin
- County: Zamość
- Gmina: Skierbieszów

Wiszenki [viˈʂɛŋki] is a village in the administrative district of Gmina Skierbieszów, within Zamość County, Lublin Voivodeship, in eastern Poland.
