= Majdan Skierbieszowski =

- Village
- Location within Poland
- Coordinates: 50°53′N 23°23′E
- Country: Poland
- Voivodeship: Lublin
- County: Zamość
- Gmina: Skierbieszów

Majdan Skierbieszowski (Polish pronunciation: [ˈmajdan skʲɛrbjɛˈʂɔfskʲi]) is a village in the administrative district of Gmina Skierbieszów, within Zamość County, Lublin Voivodeship, in eastern Poland.
