= Bończa, Lublin Voivodeship =

Bończa
- Village
- Location within Poland
- Coordinates: 50°56′N 23°26′E
- Country: Poland
- Voivodeship: Lublin
- County: Krasnystaw
- Gmina: Kraśniczyn

Bończa [ˈbɔɲt͡ʂa] is a village in the administrative district of Gmina Kraśniczyn, within Krasnystaw County, Lublin Voivodeship, in eastern Poland.

There is an Orthodox Church of the Intercession of the Theotokos in the village, situated outside the residential area, on a hill along the Krasnystaw–Uchanie–Hrubieszów road.
