= Wiszenki-Kolonia =

- Village
- Location within Poland
- Coordinates: 50°53′40″N 23°18′15″E
- Country: Poland
- Voivodeship: Lublin
- County: Zamość
- Gmina: Skierbieszów

Wiszenki-Kolonia [viˈʂɛŋki kɔˈlɔɲa] is a village in the administrative district of Gmina Skierbieszów, within Zamość County, Lublin Voivodeship, in eastern Poland.
