= Czajki, Lublin Voivodeship =

Czajki
- Village
- Location within Poland
- Coordinates: 50°55′13″N 23°21′22″E
- Country: Poland
- Voivodeship: Lublin
- County: Krasnystaw
- Gmina: Kraśniczyn

Czajki [ˈt͡ʂai̯ki] is a village in the administrative district of Gmina Kraśniczyn, within Krasnystaw County, Lublin Voivodeship, in eastern Poland.
