= Surhów-Kolonia =

- Village
- Location within Poland
- Coordinates: 50°56′20″N 23°16′10″E
- Country: Poland
- Voivodeship: Lublin
- County: Krasnystaw
- Gmina: Kraśniczyn

Surhów-Kolonia [ˈsurxuf kɔˈlɔɲa] is a village in the administrative district of Gmina Kraśniczyn, within Krasnystaw County, Lublin Voivodeship, in eastern Poland.
