= Drewniki, Zamość County =

Drewniki
- Village
- Location within Poland
- Coordinates: 50°53′39″N 23°23′24″E
- Country: Poland
- Voivodeship: Lublin
- County: Zamość
- Gmina: Skierbieszów

Drewniki [drɛvˈniki] is a village in the administrative district of Gmina Skierbieszów, within Zamość County, Lublin Voivodeship, in eastern Poland.
