= Szorcówka =

- Village
- Location within Poland
- Coordinates: 50°49′N 23°26′E
- Country: Poland
- Voivodeship: Lublin
- County: Zamość
- Gmina: Skierbieszów

Szorcówka [ʂɔrˈt͡sufka] is a village in the administrative district of Gmina Skierbieszów, within Zamość County, Lublin Voivodeship, in eastern Poland.
