= Iłowiec, Lublin Voivodeship =

Iłowiec
- Village
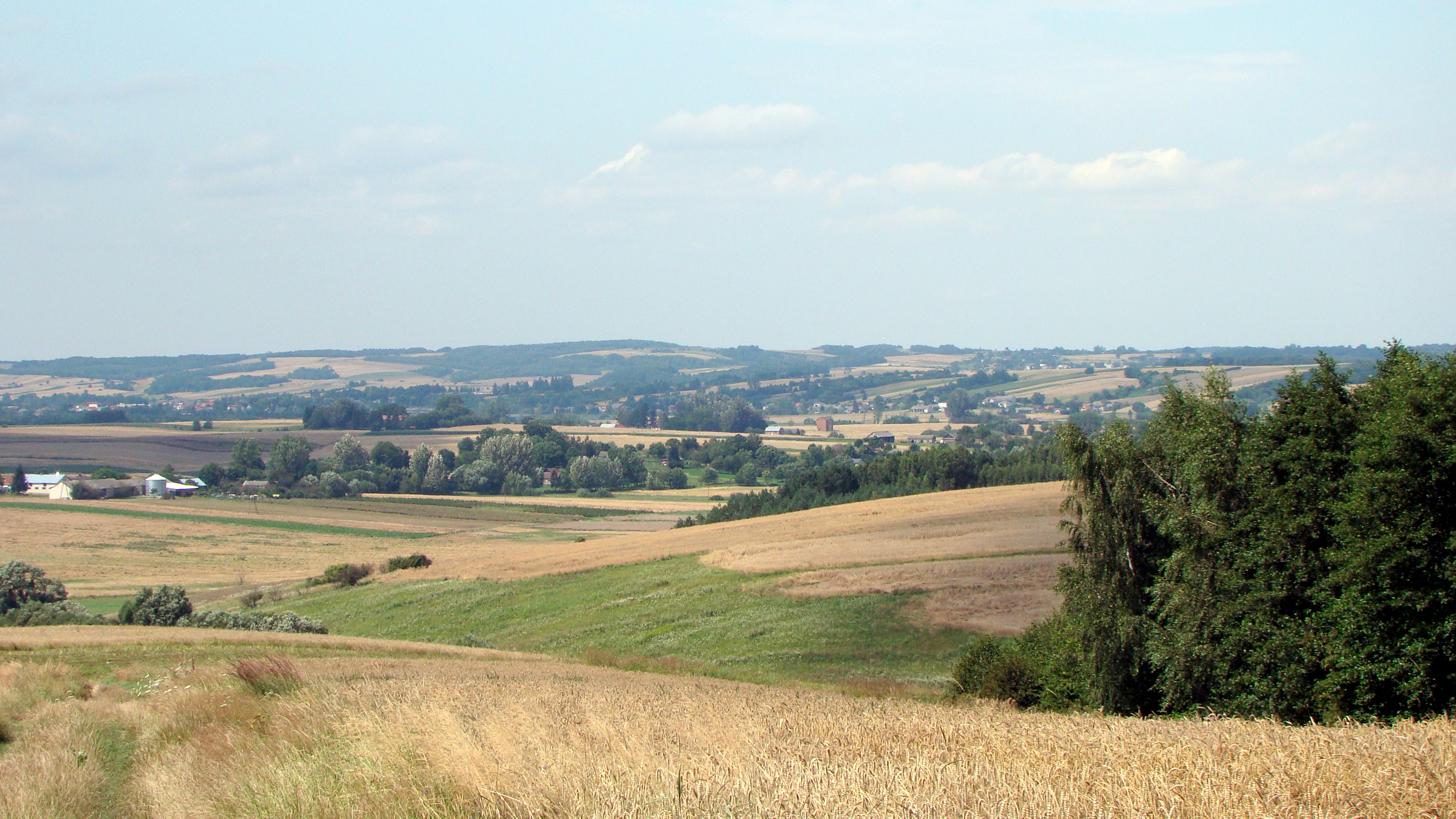

- Location within Poland
- Coordinates: 50°50′N 23°24′E
- Country: Poland
- Voivodeship: Lublin
- County: Zamość
- Gmina: Skierbieszów
- Time zone: UTC+1 (CET)
  - Summer (DST): UTC+2 (CEST)

Iłowiec [iˈwɔvjɛt͡s] is a village in the administrative district of Gmina Skierbieszów, within Zamość County, Lublin Voivodeship, in eastern Poland.

== History ==
13 Polish citizens were murdered by Nazi Germany in the village during World War II.
