= Pniaki =

- Village
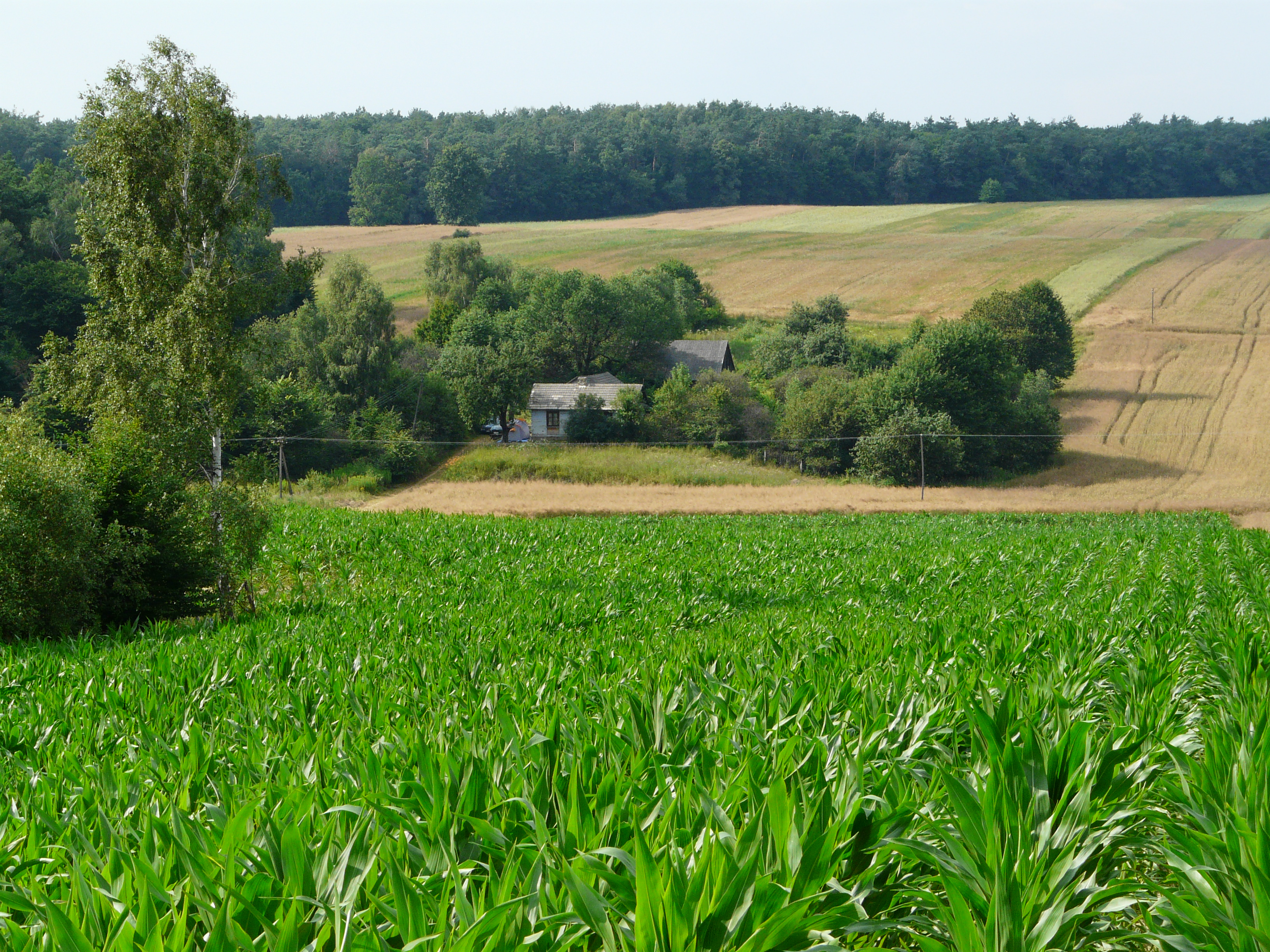
- Overlooking Pniaki

- Location within Poland
- Coordinates: 50°57′31″N 23°19′37″E
- Country: Poland
- Voivodeship: Lublin
- County: Krasnystaw
- Gmina: Kraśniczyn

Pniaki [ˈpɲaki] is a village in the administrative district of Gmina Kraśniczyn, within Krasnystaw County, Lublin Voivodeship, in eastern Poland. The village became desolate in first decade of the 21st century.
