= Podhuszczka =

- Village
- Location within Poland
- Coordinates: 50°51′16″N 23°19′48″E
- Country: Poland
- Voivodeship: Lublin
- County: Zamość
- Gmina: Skierbieszów

Podhuszczka [pɔtˈxuʂt͡ʂka] is a village in the administrative district of Gmina Skierbieszów, within Zamość County, Lublin Voivodeship, in eastern Poland.
