= Dębowiec, Zamość County =

Dębowiec
- Village
- Location within Poland
- Coordinates: 50°47′N 23°20′E
- Country: Poland
- Voivodeship: Lublin
- County: Zamość
- Gmina: Skierbieszów

Dębowiec [dɛmˈbɔvjɛt͡s] is a village in the administrative district of Gmina Skierbieszów, within Zamość County, Lublin Voivodeship, in eastern Poland.
