= Surhów =

- Village
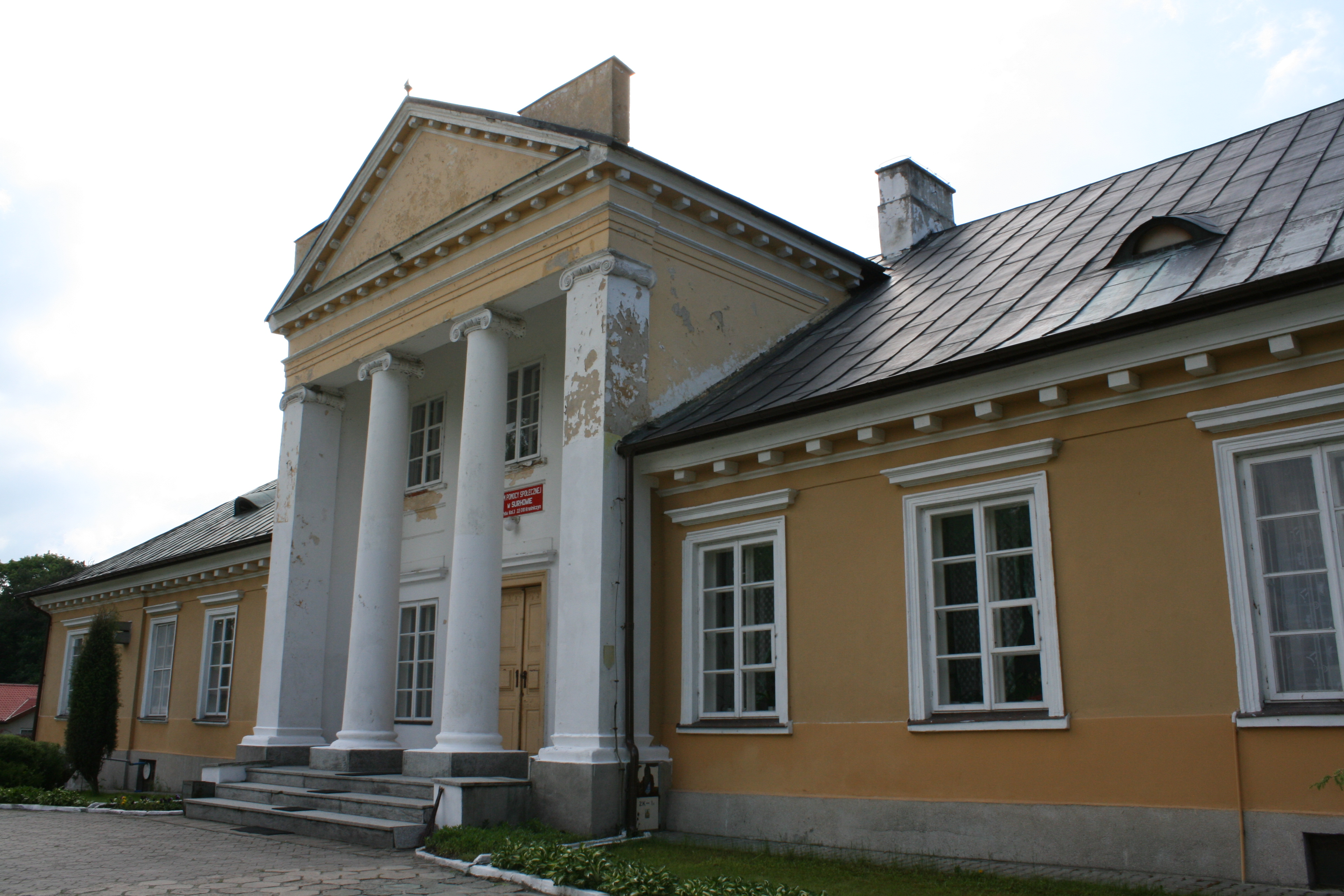
- Surhów Palace

- Location within Poland
- Coordinates: 50°56′N 23°16′E
- Country: Poland
- Voivodeship: Lublin
- County: Krasnystaw
- Gmina: Kraśniczyn
- Time zone: UTC+1 (CET)
  - Summer (DST): UTC+2 (CEST)
- Vehicle registration: LKS

Surhów [ˈsurxuf] is a village in the administrative district of Gmina Kraśniczyn, within Krasnystaw County, Lublin Voivodeship, in eastern Poland.
