= Skierbieszów-Kolonia =

- Village
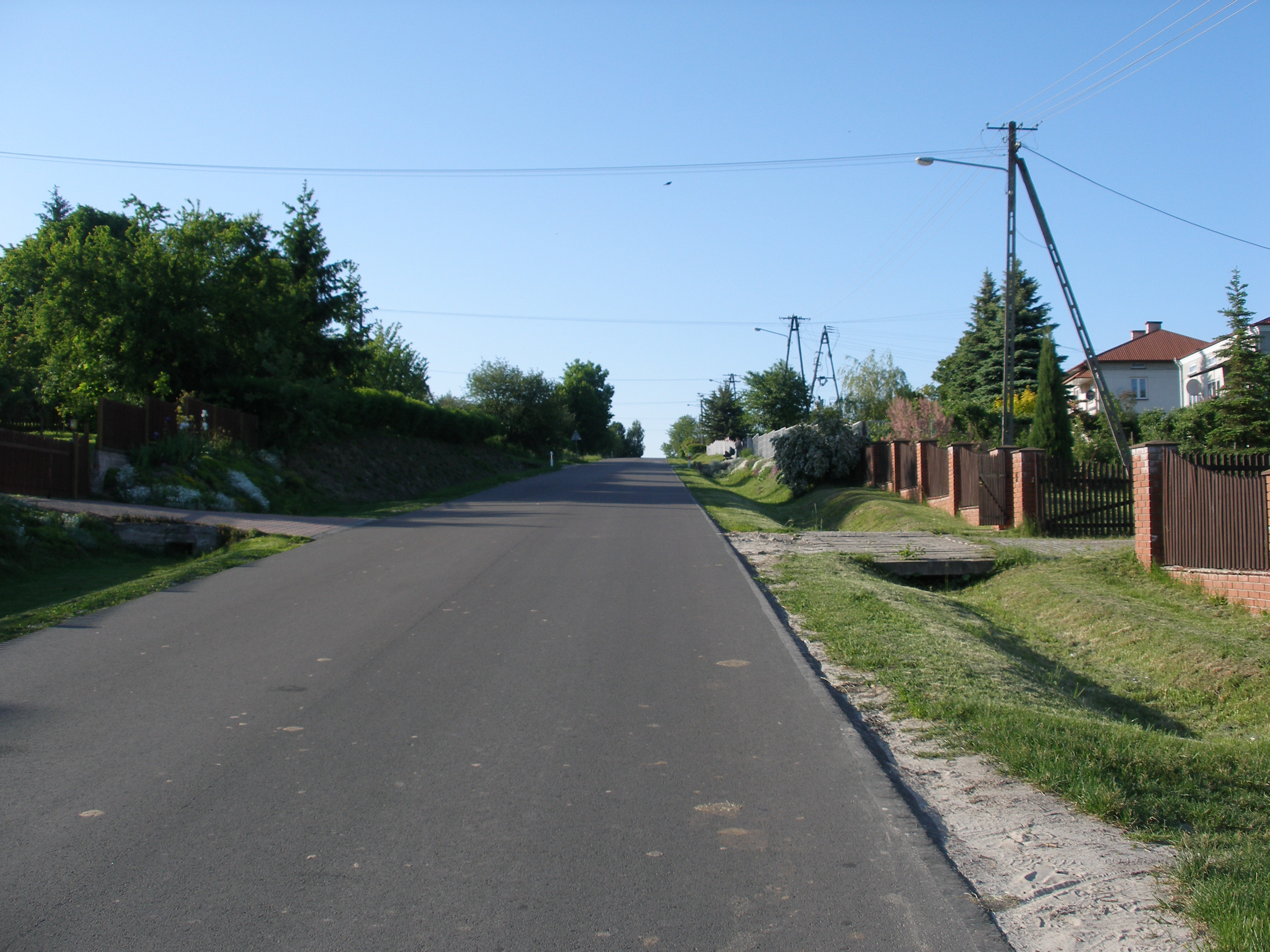
- Street of Skierbieszów-Kolonia

- Location within Poland
- Coordinates: 50°51′59″N 23°22′40″E
- Country: Poland
- Voivodeship: Lublin
- County: Zamość
- Gmina: Skierbieszów

Skierbieszów-Kolonia [skʲɛrˈbjɛʂuf kɔˈlɔɲa] is a village in the administrative district of Gmina Skierbieszów, within Zamość County, Lublin Voivodeship, in eastern Poland.
