= Dębowiec-Kolonia =

- Village
- Location within Poland
- Coordinates: 50°47′11″N 23°19′09″E
- Country: Poland
- Voivodeship: Lublin
- County: Zamość
- Gmina: Skierbieszów

Dębowiec-Kolonia [dɛmˈbɔvjɛt͡s kɔˈlɔɲa] is a village in the administrative district of Gmina Skierbieszów, within Zamość County, Lublin Voivodeship, in eastern Poland.
