= Kraśniczyn =

- Village
- Location within Poland
- Coordinates: 50°56′N 23°22′E
- Country: Poland
- Voivodeship: Lublin
- County: Krasnystaw
- Gmina: Kraśniczyn
- Population: 447
- Website: http://www.krasniczyn.lubelskie.pl/

Kraśniczyn [kraɕˈnit͡ʂɨn] is a village in Krasnystaw County, Lublin Voivodeship, in eastern Poland. It is the seat of the gmina (administrative district) called Gmina Kraśniczyn.
