= Nowa Lipina =

- Village
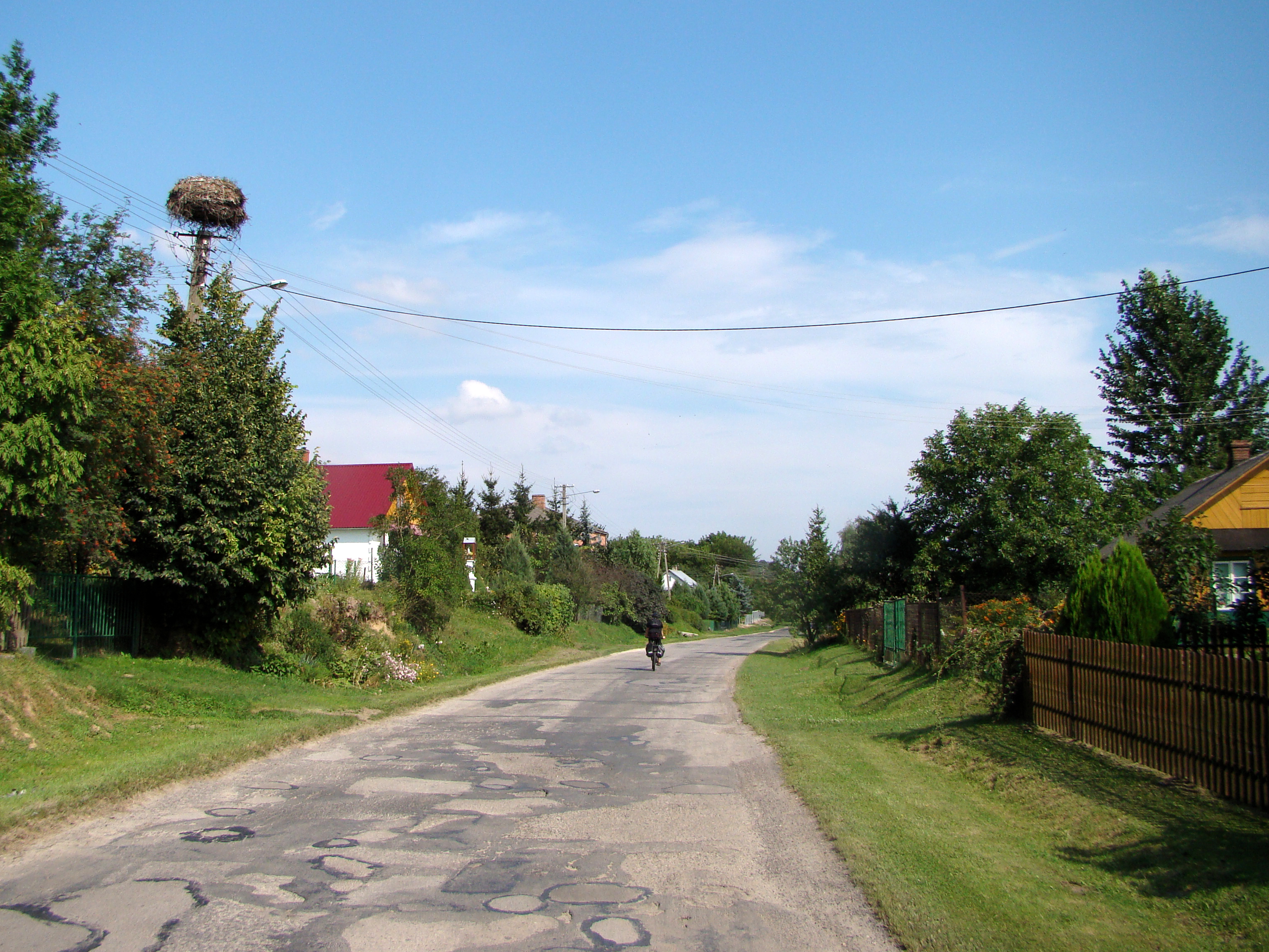
- Road in Nowa Lipina

- Location within Poland
- Coordinates: 50°50′32″N 23°24′52″E
- Country: Poland
- Voivodeship: Lublin
- County: Zamość
- Gmina: Skierbieszów
- Time zone: UTC+1 (CET)
  - Summer (DST): UTC+2 (CEST)

Nowa Lipina [ˈnɔva liˈpina] is a village in the administrative district of Gmina Skierbieszów, within Zamość County, Lublin Voivodeship, in eastern Poland. Currently, the population is 54 people, and from the year of 2000 to 2015, the population change is +22.7%.

== History ==
Three Polish citizens were murdered by Nazi Germany in the village during World War II.
