= Łukaszówka =

- Village
- Location within Poland
- Coordinates: 50°57′N 23°18′E
- Country: Poland
- Voivodeship: Lublin
- County: Krasnystaw
- Gmina: Kraśniczyn

Łukaszówka [wukaˈʂufka] is a village in the administrative district of Gmina Kraśniczyn, within Krasnystaw County, Lublin Voivodeship, in Eastern Poland.

According to the 2021 census, Łukaszówka has a population of 52 inhabitants.
