= Zrąb-Kolonia =

- Village
- Location within Poland
- Coordinates: 50°48′13″N 23°18′59″E
- Country: Poland
- Voivodeship: Lublin
- County: Zamość
- Gmina: Skierbieszów
- Population: 260

Zrąb-Kolonia [ˈzrɔmp kɔˈlɔɲa] is a village in the administrative district of Gmina Skierbieszów, within Zamość County, Lublin Voivodeship, in eastern Poland.
