= Stara Lipina =

- Village
- Location within Poland
- Coordinates: 50°52′00″N 23°25′07″E
- Country: Poland
- Voivodeship: Lublin
- County: Zamość
- Gmina: Skierbieszów

Stara Lipina [ˈstara liˈpina] is a village in the administrative district of Gmina Skierbieszów, within Zamość County, Lublin Voivodeship, in eastern Poland.
