= Skierbieszów =

- Village
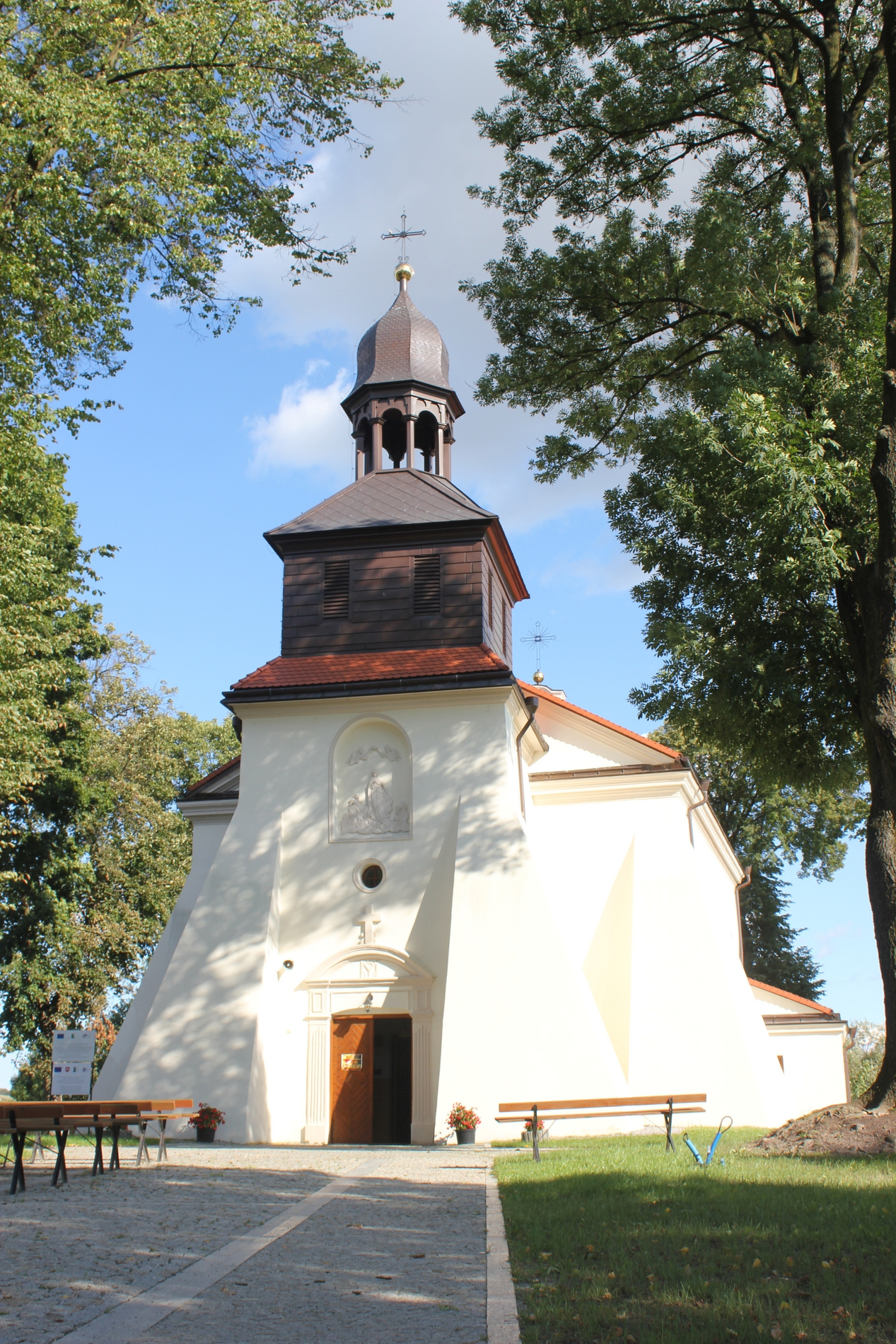
- Church of the Assumption in Skierbieszów

- Location within Poland
- Coordinates: 50°51′6″N 23°21′55″E
- Country: Poland
- Voivodeship: Lublin
- County: Zamość
- Gmina: Skierbieszów
- Elevation: 208 m (682 ft)

Population
  - Total: 1,317
- Time zone: UTC+1 (CET)
  - Summer (DST): UTC+2 (CEST)
- Vehicle registration: LZA

Skierbieszów [skʲɛrˈbjɛʂuf] is a village in Zamość County, Lublin Voivodeship, in eastern Poland. It is the seat of the gmina (administrative district) called Gmina Skierbieszów. There is a castle in the village.

== History ==
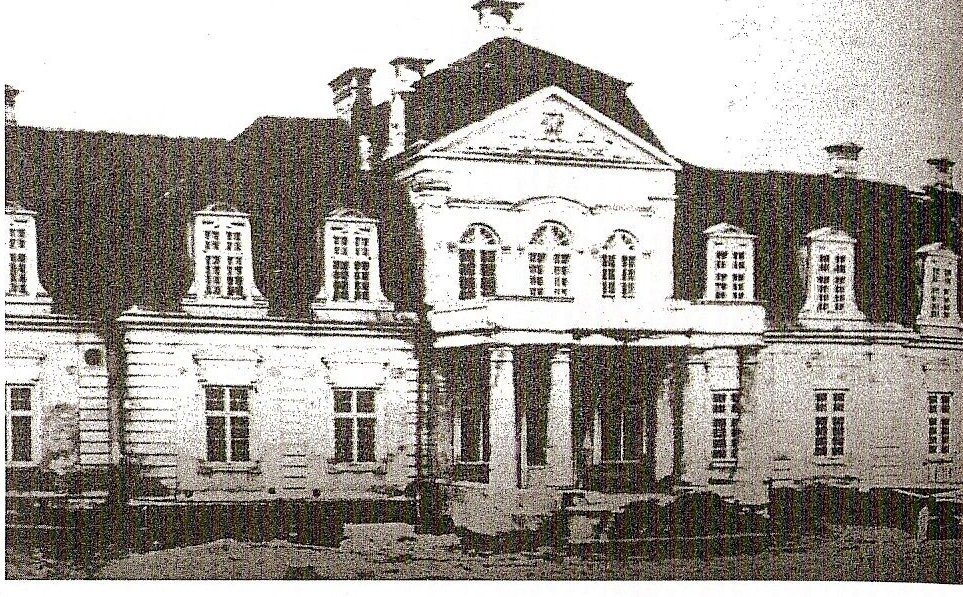
Wydżga Manor in 1914

In 1428 the village was given to the bishop Jan Zborowski of Clan of Ostoja and 1453 the village was given town rights by the Polish King. Skierbieszów was a town until 1822 and the coat of arms of the town/village is of Ostoja.

Following the German-Soviet invasion of Poland, which started World War II in September 1939, the town was occupied by Nazi Germany. In November 1942, the Polish inhabitants of Skierbieszów were expelled to make room for German settlers. 56 Polish citizens were murdered by Nazi Germany in the village during the war. Former German President Horst Köhler was born in the village during the occupation. The village was briefly renamed Heidenstein until the arrival of Soviet forces in 1944. In 1945-46 the Polish residents began returning to their homes.
