= Sławęcin, Lublin Voivodeship =

Sławęcin
- Village
- Location within Poland
- Coordinates: 50°48′N 23°24′E
- Country: Poland
- Voivodeship: Lublin
- County: Zamość
- Gmina: Skierbieszów

Sławęcin [swaˈvɛnt͡ɕin] is a village in the administrative district of Gmina Skierbieszów, within Zamość County, Lublin Voivodeship, in eastern Poland.
