= Gmina Kraśniczyn =

Gmina Kraśniczyn Kraśniczyn Commune
- Gmina
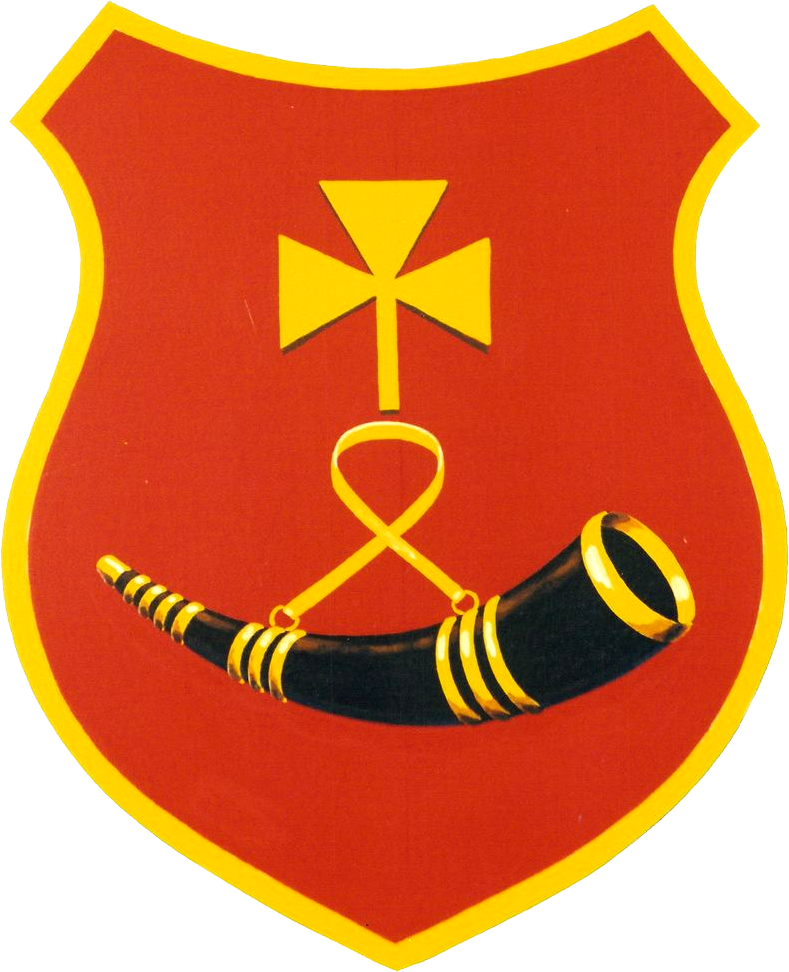
- Coat of arms
- Interactive map of Gmina Kraśniczyn
- Coordinates (Kraśniczyn): 50°56′N 23°22′E
- Country: Poland
- Voivodeship: Lublin
- County: Krasnystaw
- Seat: Kraśniczyn

Area
  - Total: 110.02 km^{2} (42.48 sq mi)

Population (2006)
  - Total: 4,284
  - Density: 38.94/km^{2} (100.8/sq mi)

Gmina Kraśniczyn is a rural gmina (administrative district) in Krasnystaw County, Lublin Voivodeship, in eastern Poland. Its seat is the village of Kraśniczyn, which lies approximately 16 kilometres (10 mi) south-east of Krasnystaw and 66 km (41 mi) south-east of the regional capital Lublin.

The gmina covers an area of 110.02 square kilometres (42.5 sq mi), and as of 2006 its total population is 4,284.

The gmina contains part of the protected area called Skierbieszów Landscape Park.

== Villages ==
Gmina Kraśniczyn contains the villages and settlements of Anielpol, Bończa, Bończa-Kolonia, Brzeziny, Chełmiec, Czajki, Drewniki, Franciszków, Kraśniczyn, Łukaszówka, Majdan Surhowski, Olszanka, Pniaki, Stara Wieś, Surhów, Surhów-Kolonia, Wolica, Wólka Kraśniczyńska, Zalesie and Zastawie.

== Neighbouring gminas ==
Gmina Kraśniczyn is bordered by the gminas of Grabowiec, Izbica, Krasnystaw, Leśniowice, Siennica Różana, Skierbieszów and Wojsławice.
