= Chełmiec, Lublin Voivodeship =

Chełmiec
- Village
- Location within Poland
- Coordinates: 50°57′N 23°20′E
- Country: Poland
- Voivodeship: Lublin
- County: Krasnystaw
- Gmina: Kraśniczyn

Chełmiec [ˈxɛu̯mjɛt͡s] is a village in the administrative district of Gmina Kraśniczyn, within Krasnystaw County, Lublin Voivodeship, in eastern Poland.
