= Łaziska, Zamość County =

Łaziska
- Village
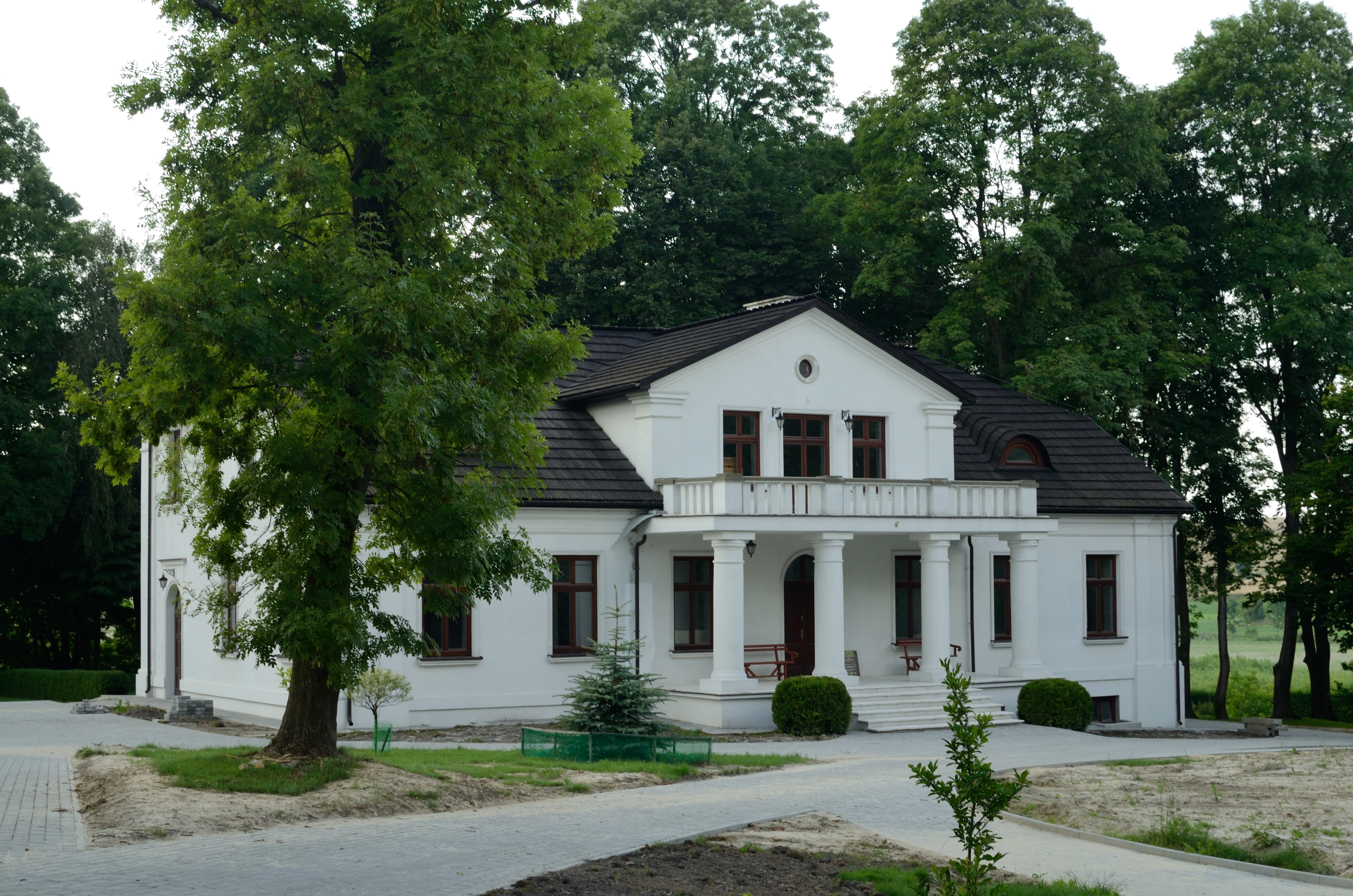
- Old manor house in Łaziska

- Location within Poland
- Coordinates: 50°49′N 23°23′E
- Country: Poland
- Voivodeship: Lublin
- County: Zamość
- Gmina: Skierbieszów

Population
  - Total: 440
- Time zone: UTC+1 (CET)
  - Summer (DST): UTC+2 (CEST)

Łaziska [waˈʑiska] is a village in the administrative district of Gmina Skierbieszów, within Zamość County, Lublin Voivodeship, in eastern Poland.

== History ==
13 Polish citizens were murdered by Nazi Germany in the village during World War II.
