= Odletajka =

- Village
- Location within Poland
- Coordinates: 50°55′N 23°45′E
- Country: Poland
- Voivodeship: Lublin
- County: Hrubieszów
- Gmina: Uchanie
- Population: 150

Odletajka [ɔdlɛˈtai̯ka] is a village in the administrative district of Gmina Uchanie, within Hrubieszów County, Lublin Voivodeship, in eastern Poland. It lays approximately 9 km (6 mi) east of Uchanie, 15 km (9 mi) north-west of Hrubieszów, and 91 km (57 mi) south-east of the regional capital Lublin.
