= Strzelce =

Strzelce may refer to the following places in Poland:

- Strzelce Opolskie, a town in Opole Voivodeship, south-west Poland, seat of Strzelce County
- Strzelce Krajeńskie, a town in Lubusz Voivodeship, west Poland, seat of Strzelce-Drezdenko County
- Strzelce, Greater Poland Voivodeship (west-central Poland)
- Strzelce, Kuyavian-Pomeranian Voivodeship (north-central Poland)
- Strzelce, Kutno County in Łódź Voivodeship (central Poland)
- Strzelce, Opoczno County in Łódź Voivodeship (central Poland)
- Strzelce, Oleśnica County in Lower Silesian Voivodeship (south-west Poland)
- Strzelce, Świdnica County in Lower Silesian Voivodeship (south-west Poland)
- Strzelce, Chełm County in Lublin Voivodeship (east Poland)
- Strzelce Landscape Park, a protected area in Lublin Voivodeship
- Strzelce, Puławy County in Lublin Voivodeship (east Poland)
- Strzelce, Opole Voivodeship (south-west Poland)
- Strzelce, Świętokrzyskie Voivodeship (south-central Poland)
- Strzelce, Warmian-Masurian Voivodeship (north Poland)
