= Kicin =

Kicin may refer to the following places:

- Kicin, Greater Poland Voivodeship (west-central Poland)
- Kicin, Lublin Voivodeship (east Poland)
- Kicin, Masovian Voivodeship (east-central Poland)
