= Radziejów (disambiguation) =

Radziejów may refer to the following places:

- Radziejów in Kuyavian-Pomeranian Voivodeship (north-central Poland)
- Radziejów, Lublin Voivodeship (east Poland)
- Radziejów, Opole Voivodeship (south-west Poland)
