= Skryhiczyn =

- Village
- Location within Poland
- Coordinates: 50°59′N 23°56′E
- Country: Poland
- Voivodeship: Lublin
- County: Chełm
- Gmina: Dubienka
- Time zone: UTC+1 (CET)
  - Summer (DST): UTC+2 (CEST)

Skryhiczyn [skrɨˈxit͡ʂɨn] is a village in the administrative district of Gmina Dubienka, within Chełm County, Lublin Voivodeship, in eastern Poland, close to the border with Ukraine.

== History ==
The founder of the village, in 1871, was Rabbi Mordko Kelman Rotenberg, nephew of the famous Góra Kalwaria tzaddik, Icchak Meir Alter. Before the German invasion of Poland at the start of World War II, the Jewish population of Skryhiczyn included 150 to 300 Jews. In November 1941, several Jews from Skryhiczyn were resettled in Hrubieszów, where they were put into forced labor. In June 1942, along with Jews from the ghetto in Hrubieszów, they were deported to the Nazi extermination camp in Sobibór. 11 Polish citizens were murdered by Nazi Germany in the village during the war.
