= Gmina Horodło =

Gmina Horodło Horodło Commune
- Gmina
- Coat of arms
- Interactive map of Gmina Horodło
- Coordinates (Horodło): 50°53′N 24°2′E
- Country: Poland
- Voivodeship: Lublin
- County: Hrubieszów
- Seat: Horodło

Area
  - Total: 130.27 km^{2} (50.30 sq mi)

Population (2013)
  - Total: 5,494
  - Density: 42.17/km^{2} (109.2/sq mi)
- Website: http://www.horodlo.pl/

Gmina Horodło is a rural gmina (administrative district) in Hrubieszów County, Lublin Voivodeship, in eastern Poland, on the border with Ukraine. Its seat is the village of Horodło, which lies approximately 13 kilometres (8 mi) north-east of Hrubieszów and 111 km (69 mi) east of the regional capital Lublin.

The gmina covers an area of 130.27 square kilometres (50.3 sq mi), and as of 2006 its total population is 5,689 (5,494 in 2013).

The gmina contains part of the protected area called Strzelce Landscape Park.

== Villages ==
Gmina Horodło contains the villages and settlements of Bereżnica, Cegielnia, Ciołki, Horodło, Hrebenne, Janki, Kobło-Kolonia, Kopyłów, Liski, Łuszków, Matcze, Poraj, Rogalin, Strzyżow, Lublin Voivodeship, and Zosin.

== Neighbouring gminas ==
Gmina Horodło is bordered by the gminas of Białopole, Dubienka and Hrubieszów. It also borders Ukraine.
