= Rozkoszówka =

- Village
- Location within Poland
- Coordinates: 50°53′45″N 23°37′28″E
- Country: Poland
- Voivodeship: Lublin
- County: Hrubieszów
- Gmina: Uchanie

Population (2021)
  - Total: 365
- Time zone: UTC+1 (CET)
  - Summer (DST): UTC+2 (CEST)

Rozkoszówka [rɔskɔˈʂufka] is a village in the administrative district of Gmina Uchanie, within Hrubieszów County, Lublin Voivodeship, in eastern Poland. It has a population of 365 as of 2021.

Between 1975 and 1998 the village belonged administratively to Zamość Voivodeship. It is the seat of a sołectwo (village council) within Gmina Uchanie. According to the 2011 National Census, the village had 425 inhabitants, making it the second-largest locality in the gmina at that time.

Roman Catholic residents belong to the parish of the Assumption of the Blessed Virgin Mary in Uchanie.

The village has an integral part called Dąbrowa, a kolonia (hamlet).

== History ==
The first mentions of the village date from 1819; a census from 1827 records a population of 293 at that time. Throughout its history, Rozkoszówka was ethnically and religiously homogeneous, with only small exceptions before World War II: in 1921, out of a total population of 730, four residents were of Ukrainian nationality and 11 of Jewish nationality; by 1938, out of a total population of 830, this had fallen to three Ukrainians and six Jews.

During the Nazi German occupation, terror in the village intensified. On 13 January 1943, German authorities carried out a deportation action against settlers in Gmina Uchanie, including the residents of Rozkoszówka. Residents were imprisoned in a temporary camp in Zamość and then divided into several groups. One of them, Paweł Pąk, was sent to the camp at Auschwitz. Others were sent by rail to forced labour in Germany. Children deemed unfit for work were transported by rail to Siedlce. Three Polish citizens were murdered by Nazi Germany in the village during World War II.

In 1953 the village was connected to radio broadcasting, and in 1956 it was electrified.

== Notable people ==
Bronisław Sowiński, a soldier of the Peasants' Battalions, was born in Rozkoszówka, as was the sculptor Stefan Momot. The village was also the birthplace of Paweł Pąk (son of the Paweł Pąk who died at Auschwitz), a soldier of Anders' Army who was killed on 12 May 1944 at Monte Cassino, and his niece, professor Maria Stopa-Boryczka.

== Bibliography ==
- Dzieje Uchań 1484-2006, ed. K. Spaleniec
