= Gmina Uchanie =

Gmina Uchanie Uchanie Commune
- Gmina
- Coat of arms
- Interactive map of Gmina Uchanie
- Coordinates (Uchanie): 50°54′N 23°38′E
- Country: Poland
- Voivodeship: Lublin
- County: Hrubieszów
- Seat: Uchanie

Area
  - Total: 120.75 km^{2} (46.62 sq mi)

Population (2013)
  - Total: 4,873
  - Density: 40.36/km^{2} (104.5/sq mi)
- Website: http://www.uchanie.gmina.woi.lublin.pl

Gmina Uchanie is a rural gmina (administrative district) in Hrubieszów County, Lublin Voivodeship, in eastern Poland. Its seat is the village of Uchanie, which lies approximately 20 kilometres (12 mi) north-west of Hrubieszów and 84 km (52 mi) south-east of the regional capital Lublin.

The gmina covers an area of 120.75 square kilometres (46.6 sq mi), and as of 2006 its total population is 5,009 (4,873 in 2013).

The gmina contains part of the protected area called Strzelce Landscape Park.

== Villages ==
Gmina Uchanie contains the villages and settlements of Aurelin, Białowody, Bokinia, Chyżowice, Dębina, Drohiczany, Feliksów, Gliniska, Jarosławiec, Lemieszów, Łuszczów, Łuszczów-Kolonia, Marysin, Miedniki, Mojsławice, Mojsławice-Kolonia, Odletajka, Pielaki, Putnowice Górne, Rozkoszówka, Staszic, Teratyn, Teratyn-Kolonia, Uchanie-Kolonia, Wola Uchańska and Wysokie.

== Neighbouring gminas ==
Gmina Uchanie is bordered by the gminas of Białopole, Grabowiec, Hrubieszów, Trzeszczany and Wojsławice.
