= Rogatka =

Rogatka may refer to the following places in Poland:

- Rogatka, Lublin Voivodeship
- Rogatka, Szczecin
