= Hrebenne =

Hrebenne is the name of two villages in Lublin Voivodeship, southeastern Poland:

- Hrebenne, Hrubieszów County
- Hrebenne, Gmina Lubycza Królewska, Tomaszów County
