= Siedliszcze =

Siedliszcze may refer to the following places:

- Siedliszcze, Gmina Dubienka in Lublin Voivodeship (east Poland)
- Siedliszcze, Gmina Siedliszcze in Lublin Voivodeship (east Poland)
- Siedliszcze, Włodawa County in Lublin Voivodeship (east Poland)
- Siedliszcze, Pomeranian Voivodeship (north Poland)
