= Stanisławówka, Lublin Voivodeship =

Stanisławówka
- Village
- Location within Poland
- Coordinates: 51°4′30″N 23°50′23″E
- Country: Poland
- Voivodeship: Lublin
- County: Chełm
- Gmina: Dubienka

Stanisławówka [staniswaˈvufka] is a village in the administrative district of Gmina Dubienka, within Chełm County, Lublin Voivodeship, in eastern Poland, close to the border with Ukraine.
