= Grobelki, Chełm County =

Grobelki
- Village
- Location within Poland
- Coordinates: 51°0′N 23°47′E
- Country: Poland
- Voivodeship: Lublin
- County: Chełm
- Gmina: Białopole
- Time zone: UTC+1 (CET)
  - Summer (DST): UTC+2 (CEST)

Grobelki [ɡrɔˈbɛlki] is a village in the administrative district of Gmina Białopole, within Chełm County, Lublin Voivodeship, in eastern Poland.

== History ==
Ten Polish citizens were murdered by Nazi Germany in the village during World War II.
