= Łuszczów-Kolonia, Hrubieszów County =

Łuszczów-Kolonia
- Village
- Location within Poland
- Coordinates: 50°52′09″N 23°46′04″E
- Country: Poland
- Voivodeship: Lublin
- County: Hrubieszów
- Gmina: Uchanie

Łuszczów-Kolonia [ˈwuʂt͡ʂuf kɔˈlɔɲa] is a village in the administrative district of Gmina Uchanie, within Hrubieszów County, Lublin Voivodeship, in eastern Poland.
