= Feliksów, Lublin Voivodeship =

Feliksów
- Village
- Location within Poland
- Coordinates: 50°54′38″N 23°36′39″E
- Country: Poland
- Voivodeship: Lublin
- County: Hrubieszów
- Gmina: Uchanie

Feliksów (Polish pronunciation: [fɛˈliksuf]) is a village in the administrative district of Gmina Uchanie, within Hrubieszów County, Lublin Voivodeship, in eastern Poland.
