= Dębina, Hrubieszów County =

Dębina
- Village
- Location within Poland
- Coordinates: 50°52′08″N 23°37′40″E
- Country: Poland
- Voivodeship: Lublin
- County: Hrubieszów
- Gmina: Uchanie

Dębina [dɛmˈbina] is a village in the administrative district of Gmina Uchanie, within Hrubieszów County, Lublin Voivodeship, in eastern Poland.
