= Wola Uchańska =

- Village
- Location within Poland
- Coordinates: 50°55′N 23°38′E
- Country: Poland
- Voivodeship: Lublin
- County: Hrubieszów
- Gmina: Uchanie

Wola Uchańska [ˈvɔla uˈxaɲska] is a village in the administrative district of Gmina Uchanie, within Hrubieszów County, Lublin Voivodeship, in eastern Poland.
