= Marysin, Gmina Uchanie =

Marysin
- Village
- Location within Poland
- Coordinates: 50°54′59″N 23°46′58″E
- Country: Poland
- Voivodeship: Lublin
- County: Hrubieszów
- Gmina: Uchanie

Marysin [maˈrɨɕin] is a village in the administrative district of Gmina Uchanie, within Hrubieszów County, Lublin Voivodeship, in eastern Poland.
