= Białopole, Lublin Voivodeship =

Białopole
- Village
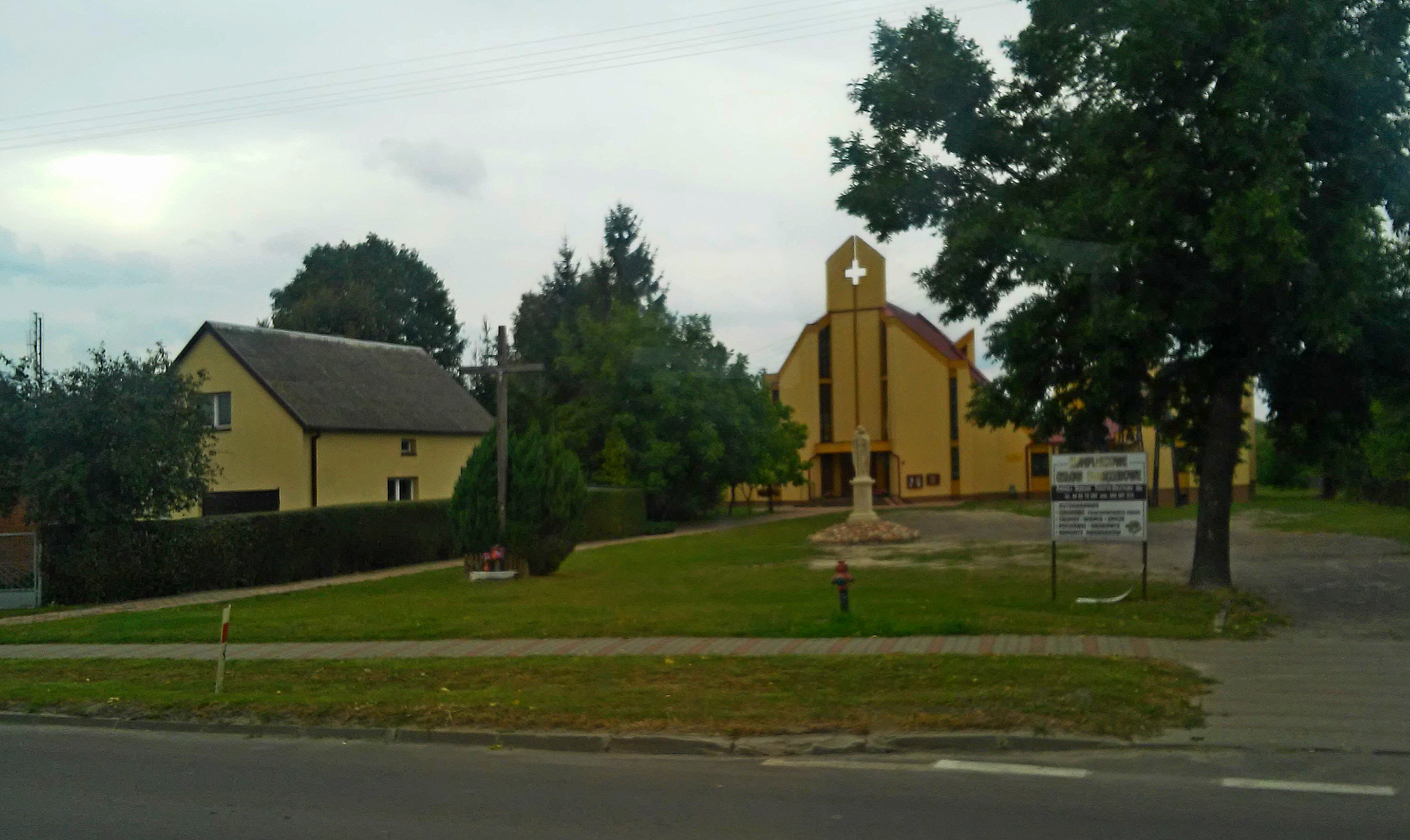
- Center of the village with the Church of Our Lady of Częstochowa

- Location within Poland
- Coordinates: 50°58′59″N 23°44′4″E
- Country: Poland
- Voivodeship: Lublin
- County: Chełm
- Gmina: Białopole

Area
  - Total: 5.24 km^{2} (2.02 sq mi)

Population (2008)
  - Total: 883
  - Density: 169/km^{2} (436/sq mi)
- Postal Code: 22-135
- Area Code: (+48) 82
- Vehicle registration: LCH

Białopole [bʲawɔˈpɔlɛ] is a village in Chełm County, Lublin Voivodeship, in eastern Poland. It is the seat of the gmina (administrative district) called Gmina Białopole.
