= Kajetanówka, Chełm County =

Kajetanówka
- Village
- Location within Poland
- Coordinates: 51°3′N 23°47′E
- Country: Poland
- Voivodeship: Lublin
- County: Chełm
- Gmina: Dubienka

Kajetanówka [kajɛtaˈnufka] is a village in the administrative district of Gmina Dubienka, within Chełm County, Lublin Voivodeship, in eastern Poland, close to the border with Ukraine.
