= Horodło =

- Village
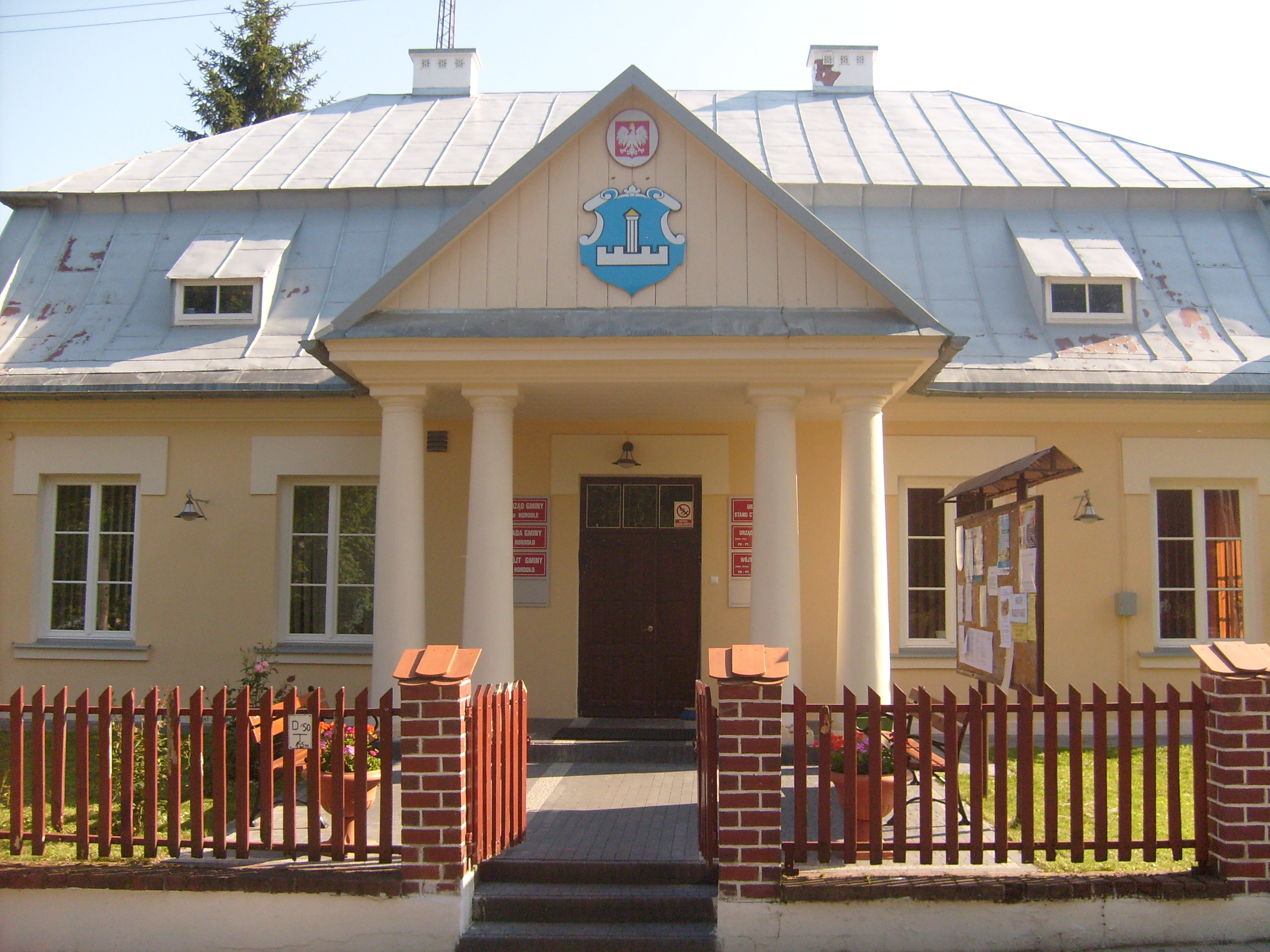
- Gmina office

- Location within Poland
- Coordinates: 50°53′N 24°2′E
- Country: Poland
- Voivodeship: Lublin
- County: Hrubieszów
- Gmina: Horodło

Population
  - Total: 1,200
- Time zone: UTC+1 (CET)
  - Summer (DST): UTC+2 (CEST)
- Vehicle registration: LHR

Horodło ([xɔˈrɔdwɔ]) is a village in Hrubieszów County, Lublin Voivodeship, in eastern Poland, on the border with Ukraine. It is the seat of the gmina (administrative district) called Gmina Horodło.

The village has a current population of 1,200.

== History ==
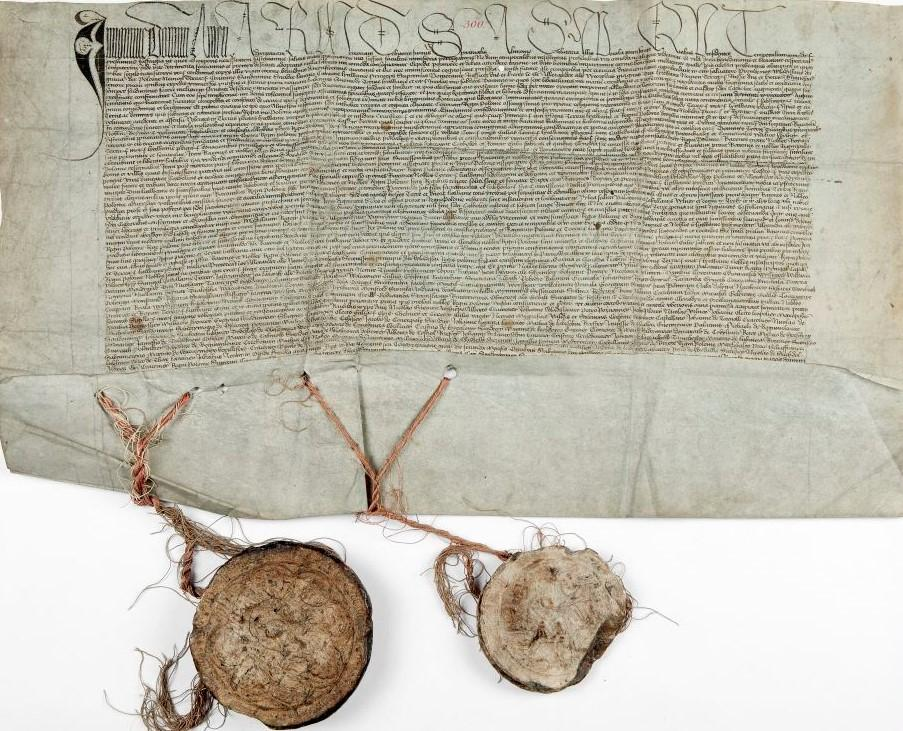
Act of the Union of Horodło, 1413

The Union of Horodło was signed there in 1413. It was a royal town of the Kingdom of Poland, administratively located in the Bełz Voivodeship in the Lesser Poland Province. During the late-18th-century Partitions of Poland, it was annexed by Austria. Following the Polish victory in the Austro-Polish War of 1809, it was regained by Poles and included within the short-lived Duchy of Warsaw, and after its dissolution in 1815, it passed to the Russian Partition of Poland. A large Polish patriotic demonstration took place here in 1861. After World War I, Poland regained independence and control of Horodło.

Following the joint German-Soviet invasion of Poland, which started World War II in September 1939, it was occupied by Germany until 1944. During the Holocaust, the population of 1,000 Jews from the town were murdered.
