= Białowody =

- Village
- Location within Poland
- Coordinates: 50°52′N 23°36′E
- Country: Poland
- Voivodeship: Lublin
- County: Hrubieszów
- Gmina: Uchanie

Białowody [bjawɔˈvɔdɨ] is a village in the administrative district of Gmina Uchanie, within Hrubieszów County, Lublin Voivodeship, in eastern Poland.
