= Gmina Białopole =

Gmina Białopole Białopole Commune
- Gmina
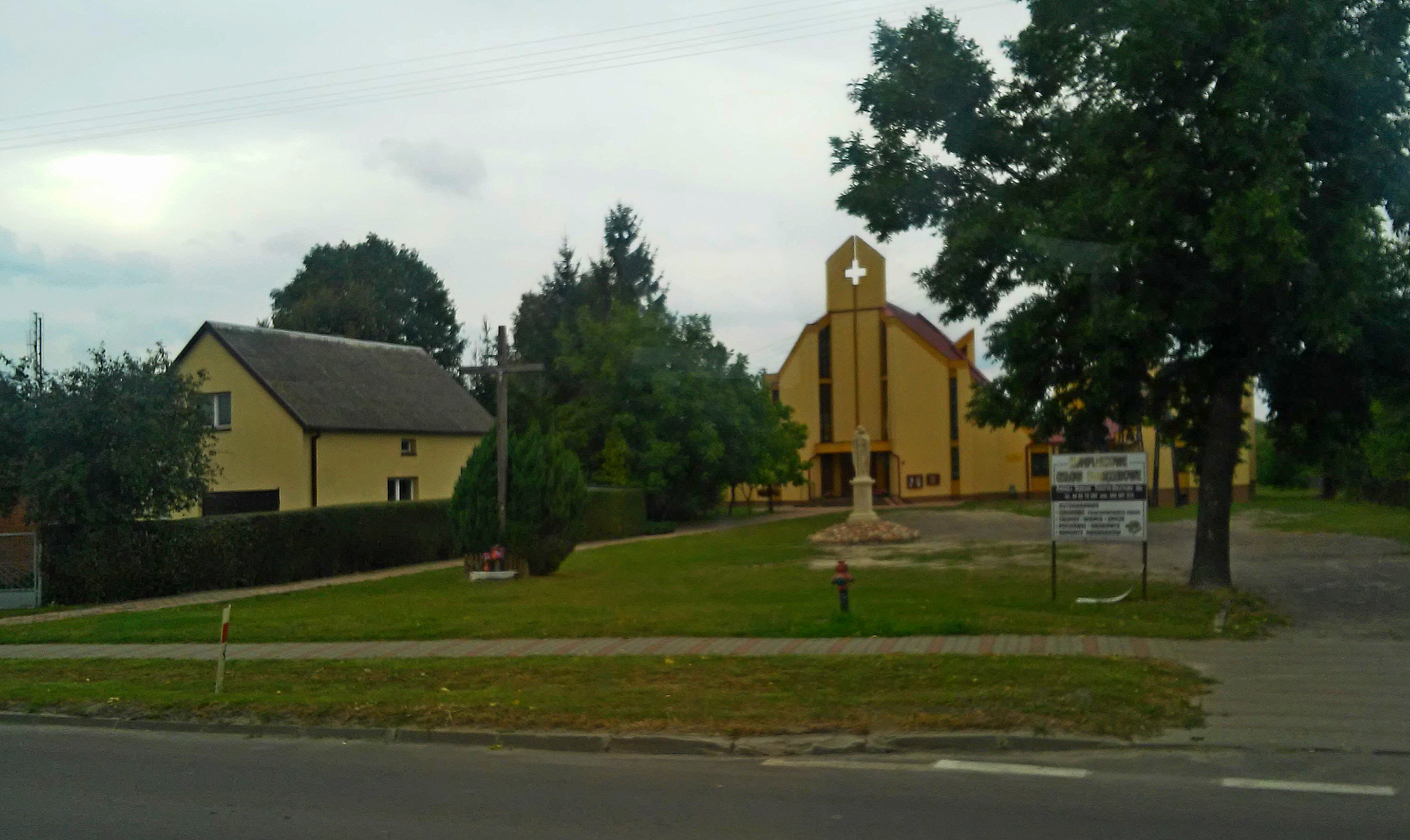

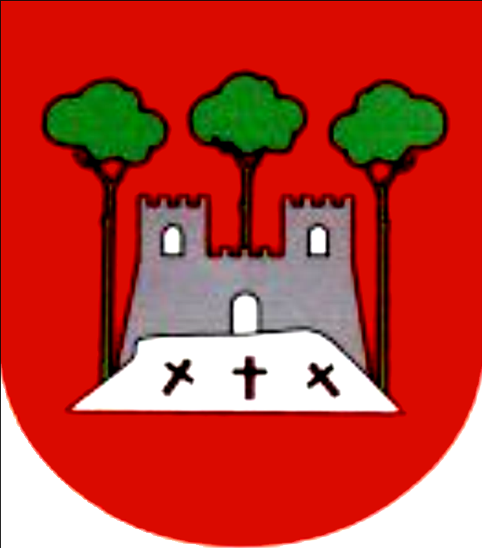
- Coat of arms

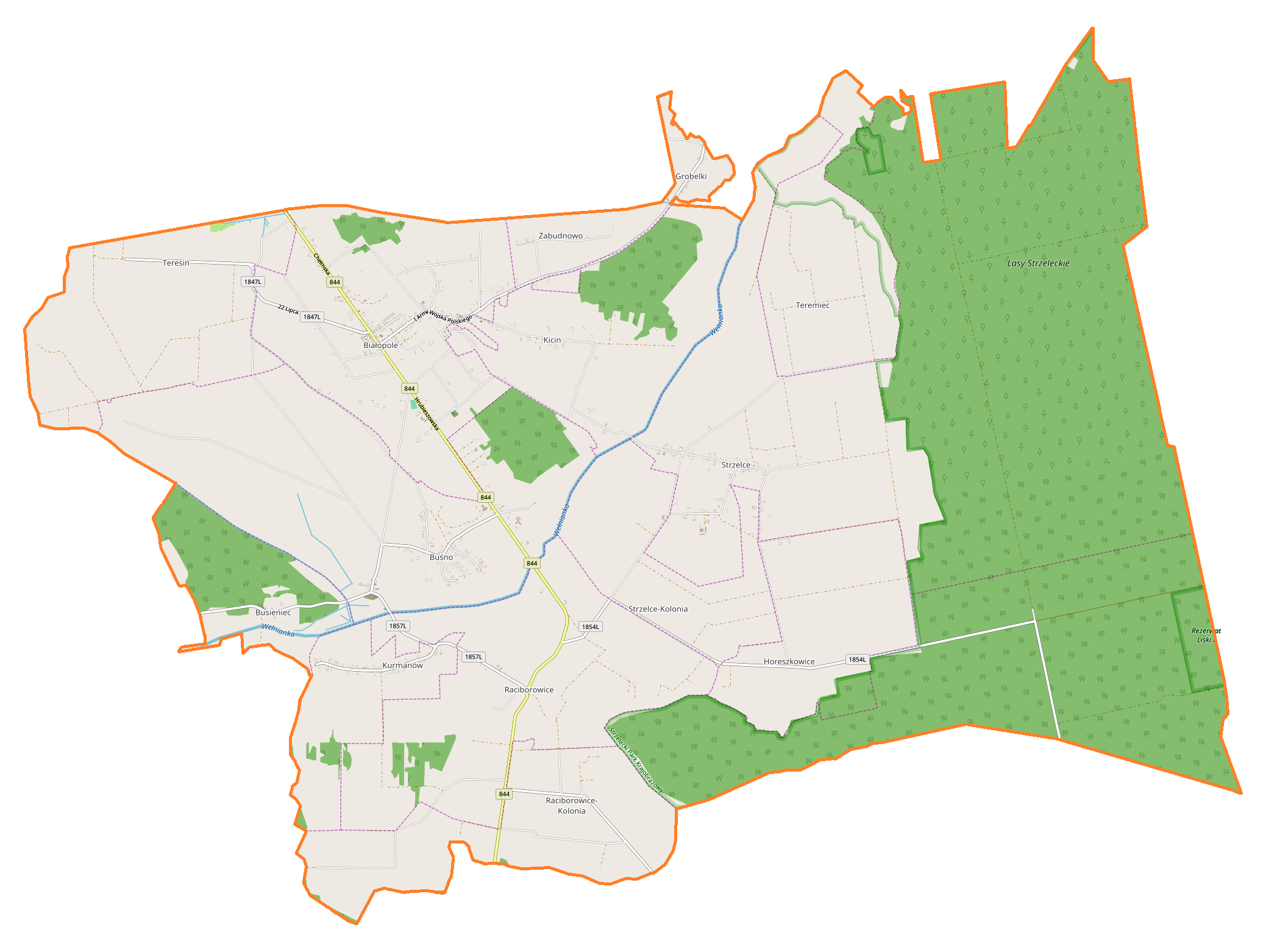

- Location within Poland
- Coordinates (Białopole): 50°58′59″N 23°44′4″E
- Country: Poland
- Voivodeship: Lublin
- County: Chełm County
- Seat: Białopole

Area
  - Total: 103.57 km^{2} (39.99 sq mi)

Population (2006)
  - Total: 3,227
  - Density: 31.16/km^{2} (80.70/sq mi)
- Website: http://bialopole.eu/

Gmina Białopole is a rural gmina (administrative district) in Chełm County, Lublin Voivodeship, in eastern Poland. Its seat is the village of Białopole, which lies approximately 26 kilometres (16 mi) south-east of Chełm and 87 km (54 mi) east of the regional capital Lublin.

The gmina covers an area of 103.57 square kilometres (40.0 sq mi), and as of 2006 its total population is 3,227.

The gmina contains part of the protected area called Strzelce Landscape Park.

== Villages ==
Gmina Białopole contains the villages and settlements of Białopole, Busieniec, Buśno, Grobelki, Horeszkowice, Kicin, Kurmanów, Maziarnia Strzelecka, Raciborowice, Raciborowice-Kolonia, Strzelce, Strzelce-Kolonia, Teremiec, Teresin and Zabudnowo.

== Neighbouring gminas ==
Gmina Białopole is bordered by the gminas of Dubienka, Horodło, Hrubieszów, Uchanie, Wojsławice and Żmudź.
