= Matcze =

- Village
- Location within Poland
- Coordinates: 50°57′N 23°59′E
- Country: Poland
- Voivodeship: Lublin
- County: Hrubieszów
- Gmina: Horodło
- Time zone: UTC+1 (CET)
  - Summer (DST): UTC+2 (CEST)

Matcze [ˈmatt͡ʂɛ] is a village in the administrative district of Gmina Horodło, within Hrubieszów County, Lublin Voivodeship, in eastern Poland, close to the border with Ukraine.

== History ==
Five Polish citizens were murdered by Nazi Germany in the village during World War II.
