= Maziarnia Strzelecka =

- Village
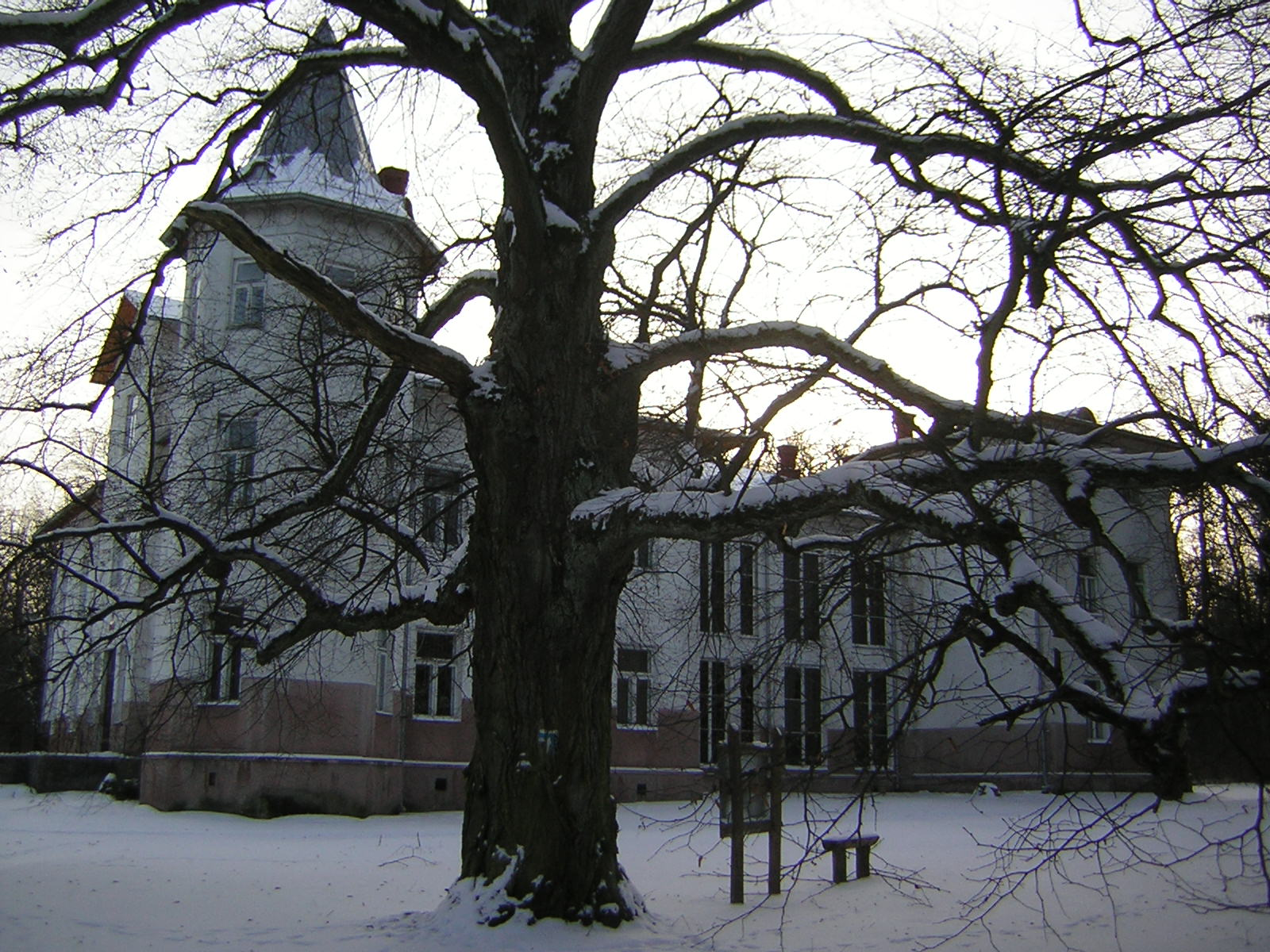
- A hunting place in Maziarnia Strzelecka

- Location within Poland
- Coordinates: 50°57′13″N 23°50′59″E
- Country: Poland
- Voivodeship: Lublin
- County: Chełm
- Gmina: Białopole

Maziarnia Strzelecka [maˈʑarɲa stʂɛˈlɛt͡ska] is a village in the administrative district of Gmina Białopole, within Chełm County, Lublin Voivodeship, in eastern Poland.
