= Bereżnica =

- Village
- Location within Poland
- Coordinates: 50°55′27″N 23°59′42″E
- Country: Poland
- Voivodeship: Lublin
- County: Hrubieszów
- Gmina: Horodło

Bereżnica [bɛrɛʐˈnit͡sa] (Polish; Berezhnitza [Russian]) is a village in the administrative district of Gmina Horodło, within Hrubieszów County, Lublin Voivodeship, in eastern Poland, close to the border with Ukraine.
