= Teresin, Gmina Białopole =

Teresin
- Village
- Location within Poland
- Coordinates: 50°59′40″N 23°42′30″E
- Country: Poland
- Voivodeship: Lublin
- County: Chełm
- Gmina: Białopole
- Time zone: UTC+1 (CET)
  - Summer (DST): UTC+2 (CEST)

Teresin (Polish pronunciation: [tɛˈrɛɕin]) is a village in the administrative district of Gmina Białopole, within Chełm County, Lublin Voivodeship, in eastern Poland.

In 2021, the population is of 217 people.

== History ==
Three Polish citizens were murdered by Nazi Germany in the village during World War II.
