= Łuszków =

- Village
- Location within Poland
- Coordinates: 50°52′28″N 24°7′5″E
- Country: Poland
- Voivodeship: Lublin
- County: Hrubieszów
- Gmina: Horodło

Łuszków [ˈwuʂkuf] is a village in the administrative district of Gmina Horodło, within Hrubieszów County, Lublin Voivodeship, in eastern Poland, close to the border with Ukraine.
