= Poraj, Lublin Voivodeship =

Poraj
- Village
- Location within Poland
- Coordinates: 50°54′N 24°0′E
- Country: Poland
- Voivodeship: Lublin
- County: Hrubieszów
- Gmina: Horodło

Poraj [ˈpɔrai̯] is a village in the administrative district of Gmina Horodło, within Hrubieszów County, Lublin Voivodeship, in eastern Poland, close to the border with Ukraine.
