= Uchanie-Kolonia =

- Village
- Location within Poland
- Coordinates: 50°55′40″N 23°36′30″E
- Country: Poland
- Voivodeship: Lublin
- County: Hrubieszów
- Gmina: Uchanie

Uchanie-Kolonia [uˈxaɲɛ kɔˈlɔɲa] is a village in the administrative district of Gmina Uchanie, within Hrubieszów County, Lublin Voivodeship, in eastern Poland. Among locals, it is commonly known as Malarzówka.
