= Church of the Dormition of the Mother of God, Hrubieszów =

Orthodox church in Hrubieszów, Poland

Coordinates: 50°48′17.9″N 23°53′22.2″E

Church of the Dormition of the Mother of God
- Cerkiew Zaśnięcia Przenajświętszej Bogurodzicy
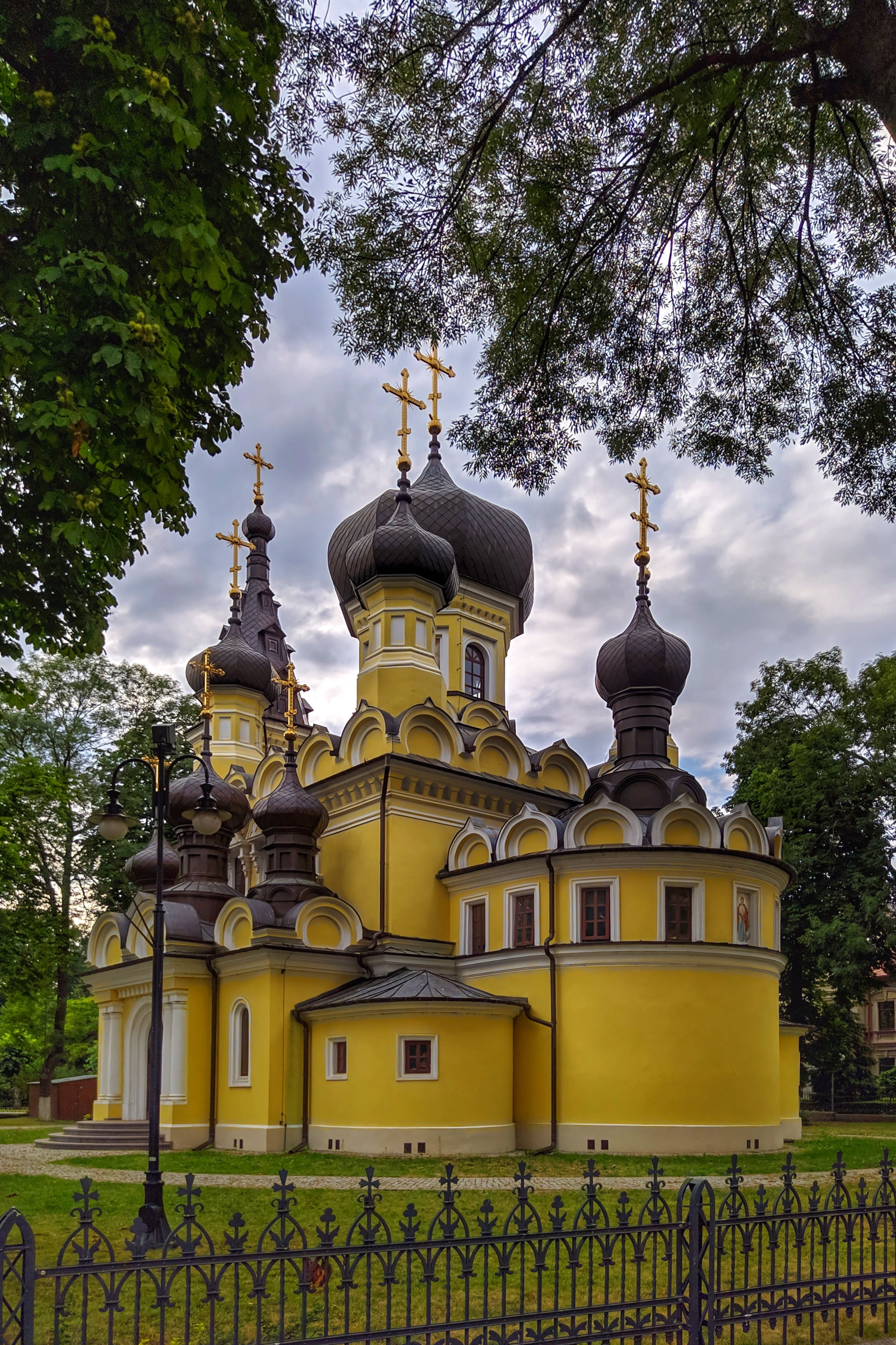
- Church of the Dormition of the Mother of God
- Location: Hrubieszów, Poland
- Denomination: Eastern Orthodoxy
- Churchmanship: Polish Orthodox Church

History
- Status: active Orthodox church
- Dedication: Dormition of the Mother of God
- Dedicated: May 13, 1876

Architecture
- Style: Russian Revival
- Years built: 1867–1875

Specifications
- Materials: brick

Administration
- Diocese: Diocese of Lublin and Chełm

The Church of the Dormition of the Mother of God is an Orthodox parish church in Hrubieszów. It belongs to the Zamość Deanery of the Diocese of Lublin and Chełm of the Polish Orthodox Church. It is located at 3 Maja Street, in the city center.

The first church under this dedication was built in Hrubieszów in the 1520s. Before 1630, this church undoubtedly came into the possession of the Uniates following a violent conflict between supporters and opponents of the Union of Brest. The current building was erected between 1867 and 1875, initiated by the incoming Russian population. The presence of an Orthodox church in Hrubieszów was intended not only to meet their religious needs but also to provide an opportunity for religious agitation among the students of the local Uniate progymnasium.

After the mass deportation, the church was closed, and pastoral activities were resumed in 1921. The Hrubieszów parish continued to operate after World War II and the deportations of Orthodox Ukrainians to the Soviet Union, which resulted in the loss of most of its faithful. It was one of the seven pastoral centers in the Chełm Land that the hierarchy of the Polish Orthodox Church made special efforts to preserve in 1944 (most of the existing Orthodox churches were closed due to a lack of faithful). Closed after Operation Vistula, the church resumed its activities just four years later, in 1951, and has been continuously active since then.

The church in Hrubieszów is a tripartite, oriented structure. It represents the Russian Revival style, similar to other Orthodox churches built during the same period in the Russian Empire. However, it stands out among other churches built in the Chełm Land in the second half of the 19th century due to its monumentalism and the number of domes – it uniquely features 13 domes. It is also the only 13-domed Orthodox church within Poland's borders and one of only two in the world (the other is in Finland).

== History ==
=== First church of the Dormition of the Mother of God in Hrubieszów ===
The Orthodox Church of the Dormition of the Mother of God in Hrubieszów was built in the 1520s, funded by the townsman Sofrony Kozula. He paid for both the construction of the church and all its furnishings. In 1596, when Bishop Dionysius of Chełm signed the Union of Brest, the entire Chełm Eparchy became a Uniate administration. By 1630, the church in Hrubieszów certainly belonged to the Uniate parish. The change in jurisdiction occurred after a violent conflict between Orthodox Christians and Uniates.

=== Brick church in Hrubieszów ===
The construction of a brick church in Hrubieszów was associated with the influx of Orthodox Russians from the Russian Empire. At the same time, a Uniate boys' progymnasium was established in the town. The opening of the parish church was intended to enable the Orthodox clergy to carry out missionary activities among its listeners and among the Uniate peasants living in villages around Hrubieszów. The pastoral station began operating in 1867, initially using a home chapel. In the same year, the construction of a freestanding brick church began. The church was built on the site of a parish church demolished in 1785. The cornerstone was laid on 11 May 1873. The construction was completed in 1875 or 1876, and the dedication took place on 13 May 1876, led by Archbishop Leoncjusz of Chełm and Warsaw. The construction was financed from a state fund allocated for the construction of new churches.

The church remained open until 1914, when the Orthodox residents of Hrubieszów went into mass deportation. In the early years after World War I and Poland's regained independence, the church remained closed. It was not listed in the 1919 register of Orthodox churches intended to be reopened by the Ministry of Religious Affairs and Public Enlightenment, nor in the list of 30 actually reopened buildings compiled in mid-1921. However, the church in Hrubieszów was restored for liturgical use later that same year. In the 1923 register of Orthodox churches in Lublin Voivodeship, it was listed as one of the 19 active churches of this faith in Hrubieszów County and the seat of one of the 17 parishes of the Hrubieszów Deanery of the Diocese of Warsaw and Chełm.

After World War II and the deportations of Orthodox Ukrainians to the Soviet Union, the parish network of the Orthodox Church in Lublin almost completely ceased to exist. Bishop Timothy Szretter, administering the church structures in the former Diocese of Chełm and Podlachia from 1944, perhaps under the pressure of the communist authorities, asked the local administration to keep only seven pastoral stations, citing the need to preserve parishes for Orthodox Poles. The church in Hrubieszów was among these churches. Despite the negative opinion of the local authorities on the matter, the Ministry of Public Administration accepted the hierarchy's request in late December 1945. (Note: In fact, in 1947, before Operation Vistula, there were still 33 active churches in the Lublin region. However, only seven churches (in Lublin, Chełm, Włodawa, Hrubieszów, Terespol, Biała Podlaska, and Jabłeczna) were officially registered and, therefore, not at risk of being closed (Wysocki (2011, p. 76)).) In 1947, the Hrubieszów parish had 100 members. After the completion of Operation Vistula, the pastoral station ceased its activities due to a lack of faithful but was restored before 1951 and included in the Lublin Deanery of the Diocese of Warsaw and Bielsko. In 1956, an incident occurred: a group of hooligans disrupted the service with shouts and whistles. In the late 1950s, funds obtained from the demolition of inactive and devastated churches in Modryń and Koniuchy were allocated for emergency repairs of the Hrubieszów church. In 1969, the number of faithful attending the Hrubieszów church and its branch in Tomaszów Lubelski was estimated at 200. In the 1970s, the church was robbed of five icons. During the same period, the local parish priest unsuccessfully applied to the Church Fund and the Metropolitan of Warsaw for state-funded or church-wide collections for the church's renovation.

In 2023, a long-term renovation was completed, during which the choir was renewed, the dome coverings were refurbished, the iconostasis was preserved, and the electrical, fire protection, and anti-burglary systems were replaced.

== Architecture ==
=== Structure ===
The church was built on the plan of a Greek cross in the Russian Revival style. It is richly decorated on the outside with columns, cornices, and niches. The entrance to the church leads through a church porch, above which rises a bell tower. The entire structure is crowned by 13 domes. These domes are positioned over the chancel (1) and the nave (5), as well as over the side annexes forming the arms of the cross (3 each). The thirteenth, smallest dome is located at the top of the tented roof of the church bell tower. The church in Hrubieszów is the only Orthodox church in Poland with such a number of domes. The domes on the bell tower are topped with gilded cast iron crosses.

The Hrubieszów church stood out for its monumentalism compared to other parish churches built in the Congress Poland in the 1860s and 1870s. Although its overall structure was analogous to that of older churches, this church was larger and had a more varied form.

=== Interior ===
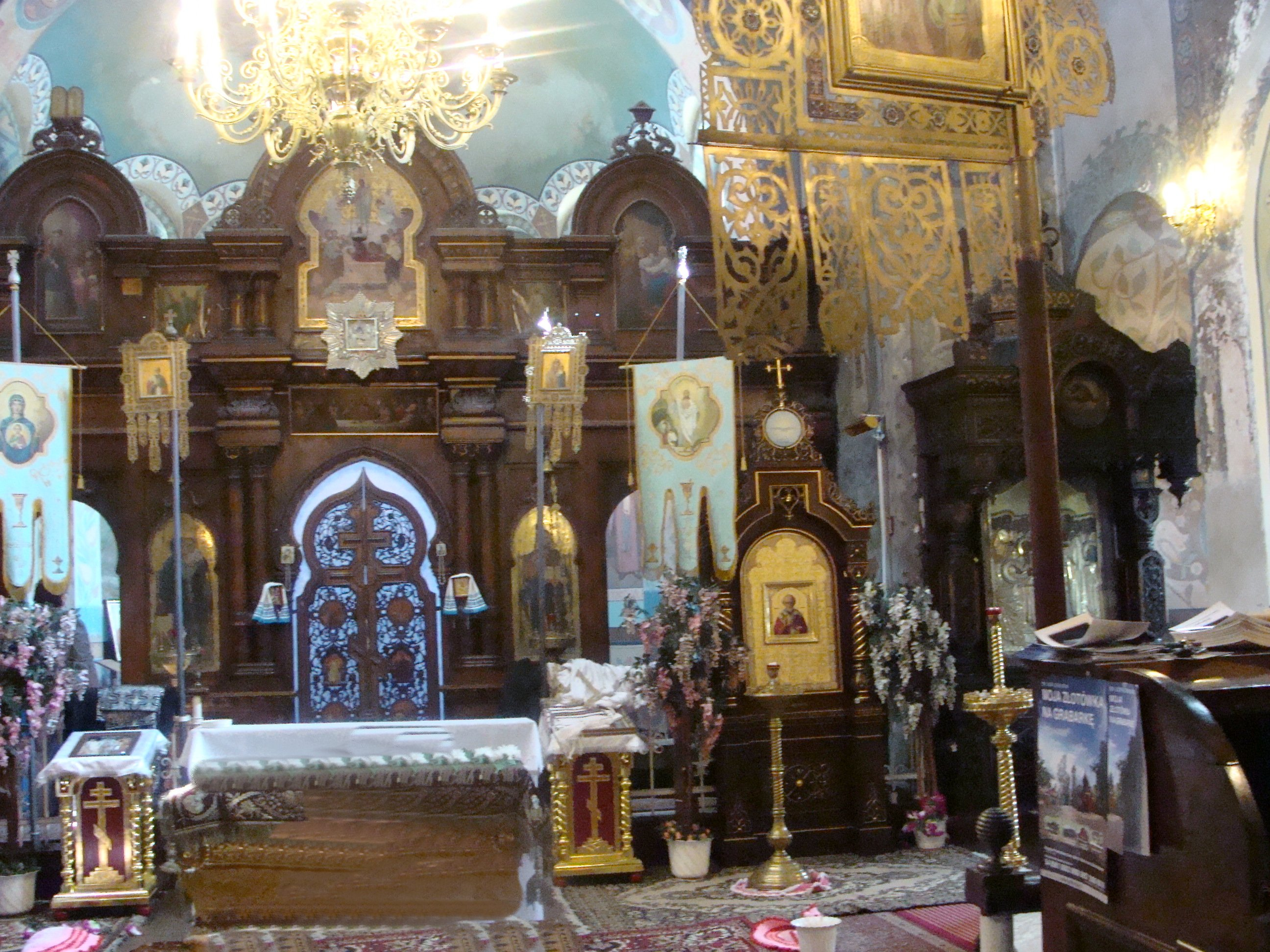
Interior of the church

Inside, there is a two-tiered iconostasis made of oak wood with gilding. The icons within it were painted by the St. Petersburg iconographer Silayev. He also created the images of saints located in the altar room in oak icon cases. The church also houses four older icons from the turn of the 18th and 19th centuries: two images of Mary (one transferred from the church in Tyszowce, demolished in 1958) and depictions of the Dormition of the Mother of God and Christ the Good Shepherd. Another piece of equipment older than the church itself is the altar cross from the first half of the 19th century.

The church bell tower originally housed five bells, which went missing during World War II. Three new bells, funded by private donors, were hung in the same place only in 2005.

The church was listed in the register of monuments on 4 April 1958 under number V-Oa/9/58, and again on 16 July 1977 under number A/176.

== Bibliography ==
- Cynalewska-Kuczma, P. (2004). Architektura cerkiewna Królestwa Polskiego narzędziem integracji z Imperium Rosyjskim (in Polish). Poznań: Wydawnictwo Naukowe Uniwersytetu Adama Mickiewicza. ISBN 83-232-1463-8.
- Wysocki, J. (2011). Ukraińcy na Lubelszczyźnie w latach 1944–1956 (in Polish). Lublin: Instytut Pamięci Narodowej. ISBN 978-83-7629-260-1.
