= Krynica, Chełm County =

Krynica
- Village
- Location within Poland
- Coordinates: 51°00′57″N 23°52′43″E
- Country: Poland
- Voivodeship: Lublin
- County: Chełm
- Gmina: Dubienka

Krynica [krɨˈnit͡sa] is a village in the administrative district of Gmina Dubienka, within Chełm County, Lublin Voivodeship, in eastern Poland, close to the border with Ukraine.
