= Teratyn-Kolonia =

Village in Lublin Voivodeship, Poland

- Village
- Location within Poland
- Coordinates: 50°54′N 23°46′E
- Country: Poland
- Voivodeship: Lublin
- County: Hrubieszów
- Gmina: Uchanie

Teratyn-Kolonia [tɛˈratɨn kɔˈlɔɲa] is a village in the administrative district of Gmina Uchanie, within Hrubieszów County, Lublin Voivodeship, in eastern Poland.
