= Strzelce-Kolonia =

- Village
- Location within Poland
- Coordinates: 50°57′11″N 23°47′01″E
- Country: Poland
- Voivodeship: Lublin
- County: Chełm
- Gmina: Białopole

Strzelce-Kolonia [ˈstʂɛlt͡sɛ kɔˈlɔɲa] is a village in the administrative district of Gmina Białopole, within Chełm County, Lublin Voivodeship, in eastern Poland.
