= Cegielnia, Hrubieszów County =

Cegielnia
- Village
- Location within Poland
- Coordinates: 50°57′N 23°57′E
- Country: Poland
- Voivodeship: Lublin
- County: Hrubieszów
- Gmina: Horodło

Cegielnia [t͡sɛˈɡʲɛlɲa] is a village in the administrative district of Gmina Horodło, within Hrubieszów County, Lublin Voivodeship, in eastern Poland, close to the border with Ukraine.
