= Raciborowice, Lublin Voivodeship =

Raciborowice
- Village
- Location within Poland
- Coordinates: 50°57′N 23°46′E
- Country: Poland
- Voivodeship: Lublin
- County: Chełm
- Gmina: Białopole
- Time zone: UTC+1 (CET)
  - Summer (DST): UTC+2 (CEST)

Raciborowice [rat͡ɕibɔrɔˈvit͡sɛ] is a village in the administrative district of Gmina Białopole, within Chełm County, Lublin Voivodeship, in eastern Poland.

== History ==
17 Polish citizens were murdered by Nazi Germany in the village during World War II.
