= Jarosławiec, Hrubieszów County =

Jarosławiec
- Village
- Location within Poland
- Coordinates: 50°54′27″N 23°42′15″E
- Country: Poland
- Voivodeship: Lublin
- County: Hrubieszów
- Gmina: Uchanie
- Population: 520

Jarosławiec [jarɔˈswavjɛt͡s] is a village in the administrative district of Gmina Uchanie, within Hrubieszów County, Lublin Voivodeship, in eastern Poland.
