= Rogalin, Lublin Voivodeship =

Rogalin
- Village
- Location within Poland
- Coordinates: 50°51′10″N 24°03′18″E
- Country: Poland
- County: Hrubieszów
- Gmina: Horodło
- Time zone: UTC+1 (CET)
  - Summer (DST): UTC+2 (CEST)
- Vehicle registration: LHR

Rogalin [rɔˈɡalin] is a village in the administrative district of Gmina Horodło, within Hrubieszów County, in eastern Poland, close to the border with Ukraine.

== History ==
During the German-Soviet invasion of Poland which started World War II, on 24 September 1939, Soviet troops committed a massacre of 28 Polish soldiers including three officers. Afterwards, the village was handed over by the Soviets to Nazi Germany in accordance with the Molotov–Ribbentrop Pact, and was occupied by Germany until 1944.
