= Gmina Dubienka =

Gmina Dubienka Dubienka Commune
- Gmina
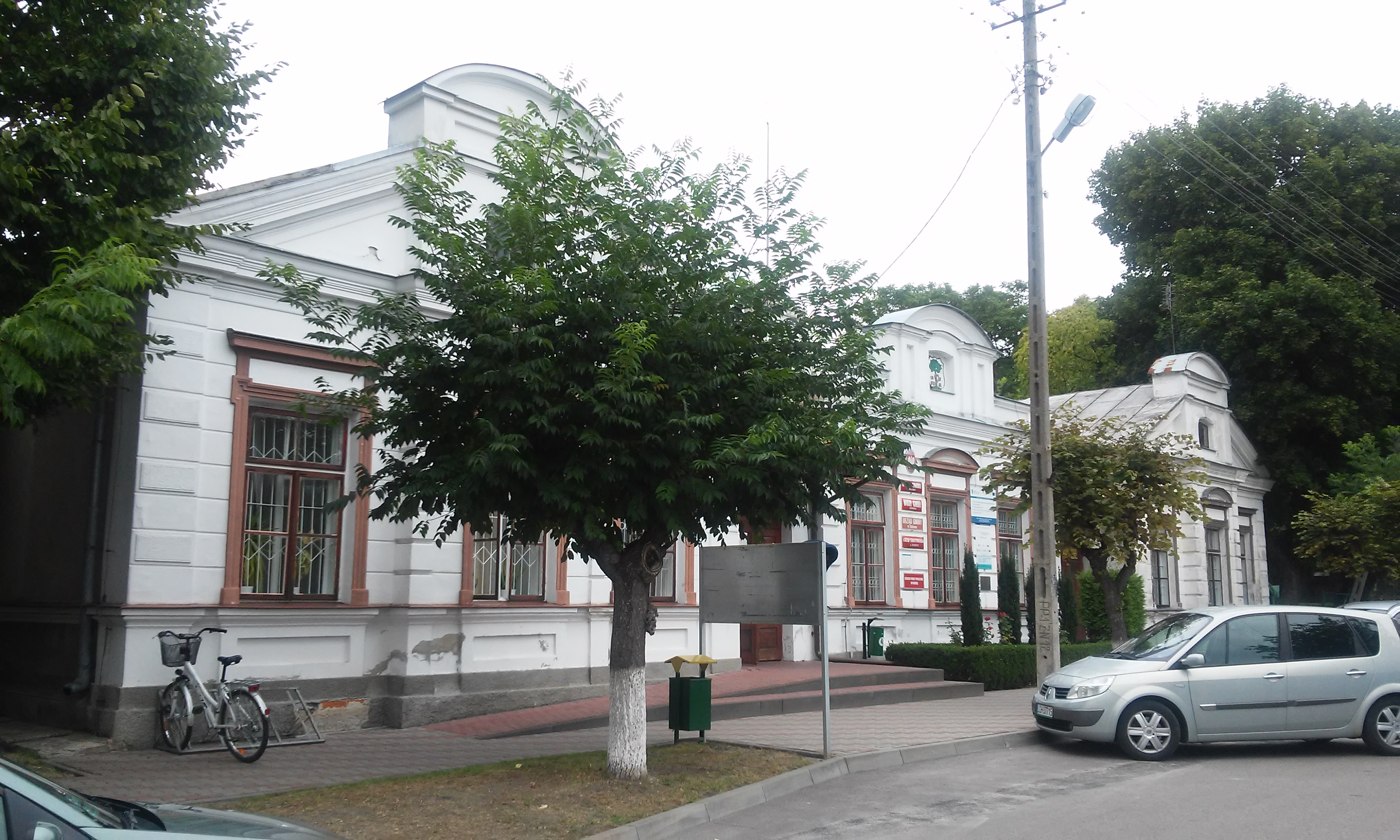

- Coat of arms
- Interactive map of Gmina Dubienka
- Coordinates (Dubienka): 51°3′N 23°53′E
- Country: Poland
- Voivodeship: Lublin
- County: Chełm County
- Seat: Dubienka

Area
  - Total: 96.26 km^{2} (37.17 sq mi)

Population (2006)
  - Total: 2,749
  - Density: 28.56/km^{2} (73.97/sq mi)
- Website: dubienka.lubelskie.pl

Gmina Dubienka is a rural gmina (administrative district) in Chełm County, Lublin Voivodeship, in eastern Poland, on the border with Ukraine. Its seat is the village of Dubienka, which lies approximately 31 kilometres (19 mi) east of Chełm and 95 km (59 mi) east of the regional capital Lublin.

The gmina covers an area of 96.26 square kilometres (37.2 sq mi), and as of 2006 its total population is 2,749.

The gmina contains part of the protected area called Strzelce Landscape Park.

== Villages ==
Gmina Dubienka contains the villages and settlements of Brzozowiec, Dubienka, Holendry, Janostrów, Jasienica, Józefów, Kajetanówka, Krynica, Lipniki, Mateuszowo, Nowokajetanówka, Radziejów, Rogatka, Siedliszcze, Skryhiczyn, Stanisławówka, Starosiele, Tuchanie, Uchańka, and Zagórnik.

== Neighbouring gminas ==
Gmina Dubienka is bordered by the gminas of Białopole, Dorohusk, Horodło and Żmudź. It also borders Ukraine.
