= Horeszkowice =

- Village
- Location within Poland
- Coordinates: 50°56′56″N 23°48′23″E
- Country: Poland
- Voivodeship: Lublin
- County: Chełm
- Gmina: Białopole

Horeszkowice [xɔrɛʂkɔˈvit͡sɛ] is a village in the administrative district of Gmina Białopole, within Chełm County, Lublin Voivodeship, in eastern Poland.
