= Józefów, Chełm County =

Józefów
- Village
- Location within Poland
- Coordinates: 50°59′N 23°53′E
- Country: Poland
- Voivodeship: Lublin
- County: Chełm
- Gmina: Dubienka

Józefów (Polish pronunciation: [juˈzɛfuf]) is a village in the administrative district of Gmina Dubienka, within Chełm County, Lublin Voivodeship, in eastern Poland, close to the border with Ukraine.
