= Bokinia =

- Village
- Location within Poland
- Coordinates: 50°56′N 23°41′E
- Country: Poland
- Voivodeship: Lublin
- County: Hrubieszów
- Gmina: Uchanie

Bokinia [bɔˈkiɲa] is a village in the administrative district of Gmina Uchanie, within Hrubieszów County, Lublin Voivodeship, in eastern Poland.
