= Strzelce Landscape Park =

Protected area in Lublin Voivodeship, Poland

Coordinates: 50.9729°N 23.8822°E

- Strzelecki Park Krajobrazowy
- IUCN category V (protected landscape/seascape)
- Interactive map of Strzelce Landscape Park
- Location: Lublin Voivodeship
- Area: 111.17 km^{2} (42.92 sq mi)
- Established: 1983

Strzelce Landscape Park (Strzelecki Park Krajobrazowy) is a protected area (Landscape Park) in eastern Poland, on the border with Ukraine. The Park was established in 1983, and covers an area of 111.17 square kilometres (42.92 sq mi).

The Park lies within Lublin Voivodeship: in Chełm County (Gmina Białopole, Gmina Dubienka) and Hrubieszów County (Gmina Horodło, Gmina Hrubieszów, Gmina Uchanie). It takes its name from the village of Strzelce in Gmina Białopole.

Within the Landscape Park are two nature reserves.
