= Wysokie, Hrubieszów County =

Wysokie
- Village
- Location within Poland
- Coordinates: 50°55′4″N 23°41′37″E
- Country: Poland
- Voivodeship: Lublin
- County: Hrubieszów
- Gmina: Uchanie
- Population: 271

Wysokie [vɨˈsɔkʲɛ] is a village in the administrative district of Gmina Uchanie, within Hrubieszów County, Lublin Voivodeship, in eastern Poland.
