= Raciborowice-Kolonia =

- Village
- Location within Poland
- Coordinates: 50°55′58″N 23°46′14″E
- Country: Poland
- Voivodeship: Lublin
- County: Chełm
- Gmina: Białopole

Raciborowice-Kolonia [rat͡ɕibɔrɔˈvit͡sɛ kɔˈlɔɲa] is a village in the administrative district of Gmina Białopole, within Chełm County, Lublin Voivodeship, in eastern Poland.
