= Tuchanie =

- Village
- Location within Poland
- Coordinates: 51°2′N 23°48′E
- Country: Poland
- Voivodeship: Lublin
- County: Chełm
- Gmina: Dubienka

Tuchanie [tuˈxaɲɛ] is a village in the administrative district of Gmina Dubienka, within Chełm County, Lublin Voivodeship, in eastern Poland, close to the border with Ukraine.
