= Kobło-Kolonia =

- Village
- Location within Poland
- Coordinates: 50°52′21″N 23°58′38″E
- Country: Poland
- Voivodeship: Lublin
- County: Hrubieszów
- Gmina: Horodło

Kobło-Kolonia [ˈkɔbwɔ kɔˈlɔɲa] is a village in the administrative district of Gmina Horodło, within Hrubieszów County, Lublin Voivodeship, in eastern Poland, close to the border with Ukraine.
