= Hrebenne, Hrubieszów County =

Hrebenne
- Village
- Location within Poland
- Coordinates: 50°52′26″N 24°00′56″E
- Country: Poland
- Voivodeship: Lublin
- County: Hrubieszów
- Gmina: Horodło

Hrebenne [xrɛˈbɛnːɛ] is a village in the administrative district of Gmina Horodło, within Hrubieszów County, Lublin Voivodeship, in southeastern Poland, close to the border with Ukraine.
