= Siedliszcze, Gmina Dubienka =

Siedliszcze
- Village
- Location within Poland
- Coordinates: 51°1′16″N 23°48′36″E
- Country: Poland
- Voivodeship: Lublin
- County: Chełm
- Gmina: Dubienka

Population
  - Total: 360

Siedliszcze [ɕɛdˈliʂt͡ʂɛ] is a village in the administrative district of Gmina Dubienka, within Chełm County, Lublin Voivodeship, in eastern Poland, close to the border with Ukraine.
