= Uchanie =

- Village
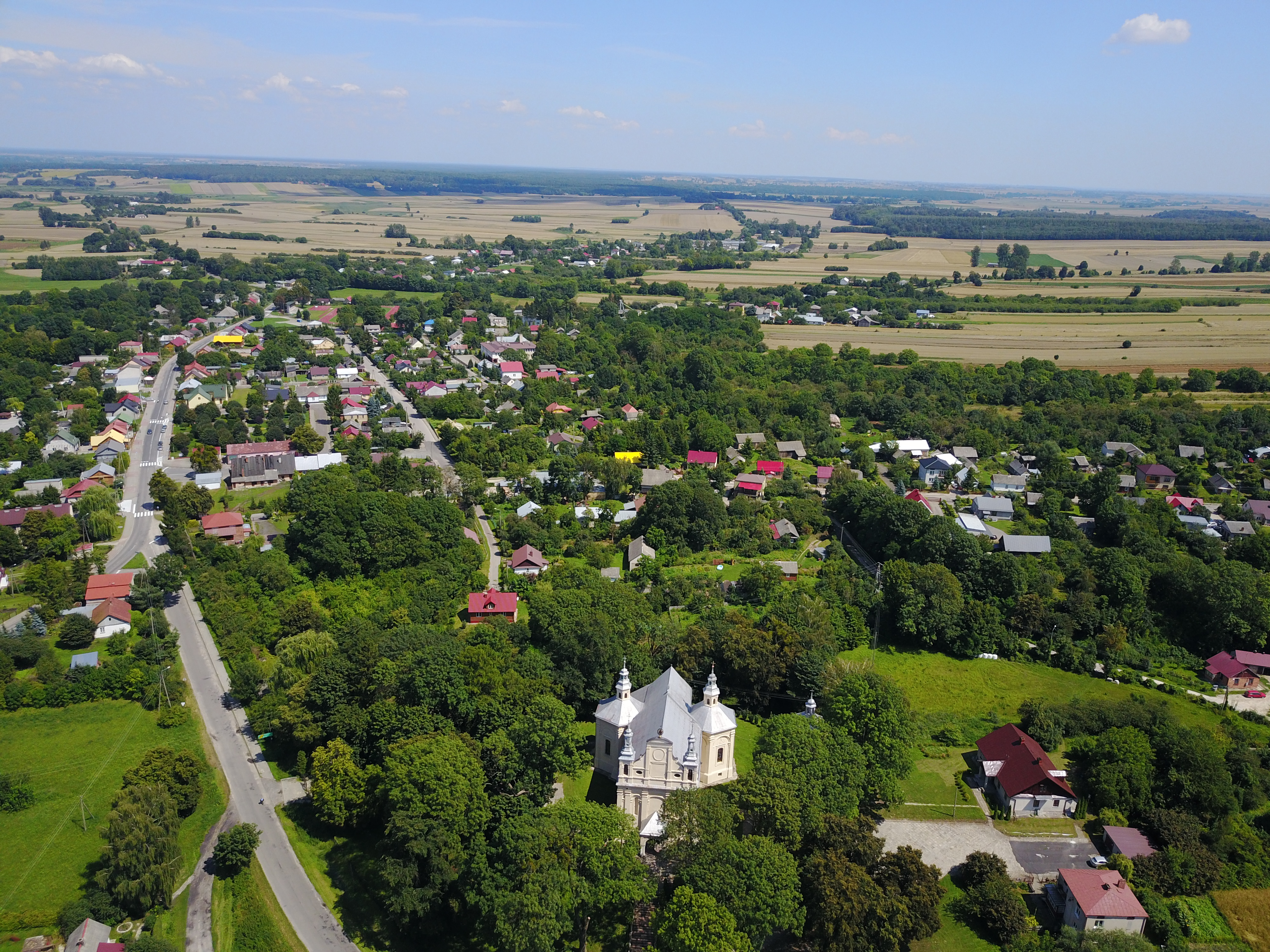
- Aerial view of Uchanie

- Location within Poland
- Coordinates: 50°54′30″N 23°39′00″E
- Country: Poland
- Voivodeship: Lublin
- County: Hrubieszów
- Gmina: Uchanie
- Time zone: UTC+1 (CET)
  - Summer (DST): UTC+2 (CEST)
- Vehicle registration: LHR

Uchanie [uˈxaɲɛ] is a village in Hrubieszów County, Lublin Voivodeship, in southeastern Poland. It is the seat of the gmina (administrative district) called Gmina Uchanie.

== History ==
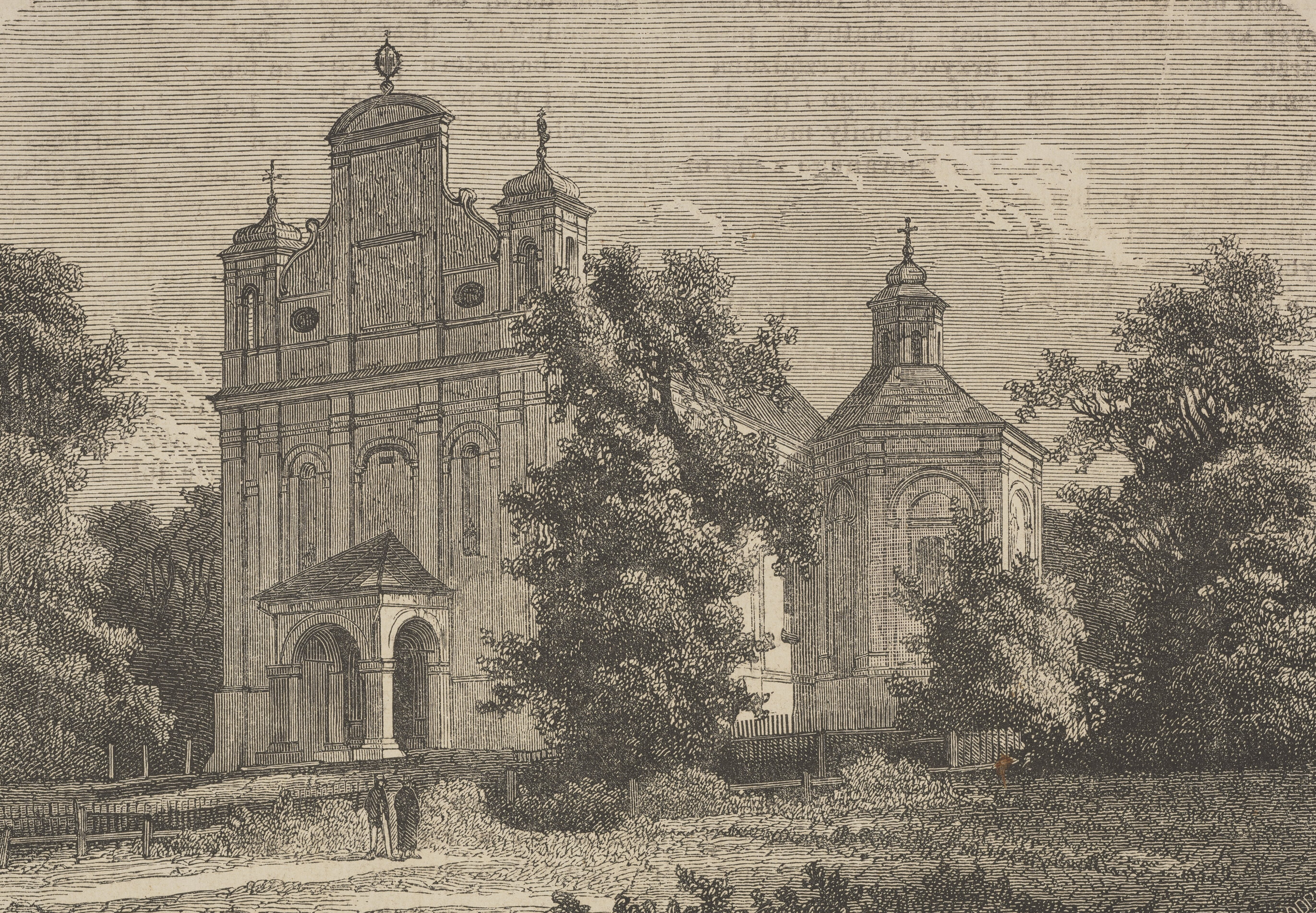
Church of the Assumption, before 1900

Uchanie was a royal village, half of which was granted in 1470 by King Casimir IV Jagiellon in Radom to Paweł Jasieński, castellan of Sandomierz, starost of Bełz and Chełm. Paweł Jasieński built a church in 1482–1484. The castle was possibly also built by Paweł Jasieński. In 1484, by an act granted in Piotrków, Casimir IV granted Magdeburg town rights and established weekly markets and annual fairs. In 1504 King Alexander Jagiellon confirmed these privileges in Kraków. 1549, the castle withstood a Tatar raid, but the church and monastery were looted. In 1596, King Sigismund III Vasa established an additional annual fair and moved the weekly markets from Wednesdays to Mondays. In 1603, he established a third annual fair and authorized the construction of a town hall and inns. Uchanie was a private town of the Jasieński, Uchański, Daniłowicz and Potocki families.

According to the data of the ethnographic expedition of 1869-1870 under the leadership of Pavlo Chubynskyi, Greek Catholics who spoke Ukrainian lived in this village In 1874, Szydłowski built a new palace near the old castle remains.

Historical population
Year	Pop.	±%
1827	867	—
1864	1,812	+109.0%

Between the years of 1928-1932, the Polish government ordered the destruction of the local Orthodox church as part of a large-scale campaign to destroy Ukrainian churches in the Chełm region and Podlasie.

Upon the German invasion of Poland at the start of World War II in 1939, Uchanie had a population of 1,161 Jews. The Jewish population was sent to nearby Hrubieszów, from where they were sent to the Sobibór extermination camp. The Jewish community then ceased to exist.
