= Zosin, Hrubieszów County =

Zosin
- Village
- Location within Poland
- Coordinates: 50°51′N 24°6′E
- Country: Poland
- Voivodeship: Lublin
- County: Hrubieszów
- Gmina: Horodło
- Population: 70

Zosin [ˈzɔɕin] is a village in the administrative district of Gmina Horodło, within Hrubieszów County, Lublin Voivodeship, in eastern Poland, close to the border with Ukraine.

The meander of the River Bug near Zosin is the easternmost point of Poland (24° 8′ 42.44″ E).

A border crossing into Ukraine is located here. Across the border is the village of Ustyluh.
