= Kicin, Lublin Voivodeship =

Kicin
- Village
- Location within Poland
- Coordinates: 50°59′N 23°46′E
- Country: Poland
- Voivodeship: Lublin
- County: Chełm
- Gmina: Białopole

Kicin [ˈkit͡ɕin] is a village in the administrative district of Gmina Białopole, within Chełm County, Lublin Voivodeship, in eastern Poland.
