= Strzelce, Chełm County =

Strzelce
- Village
- Location within Poland
- Coordinates: 50°58′N 23°48′E
- Country: Poland
- Voivodeship: Lublin
- County: Chełm
- Gmina: Białopole

Strzelce [ˈstʂɛlt͡sɛ] is a village in the administrative district of Gmina Białopole, within Chełm County, Lublin Voivodeship, in eastern Poland.
