= Hrubieszów =

Town in Lublin Voivodeship, Poland

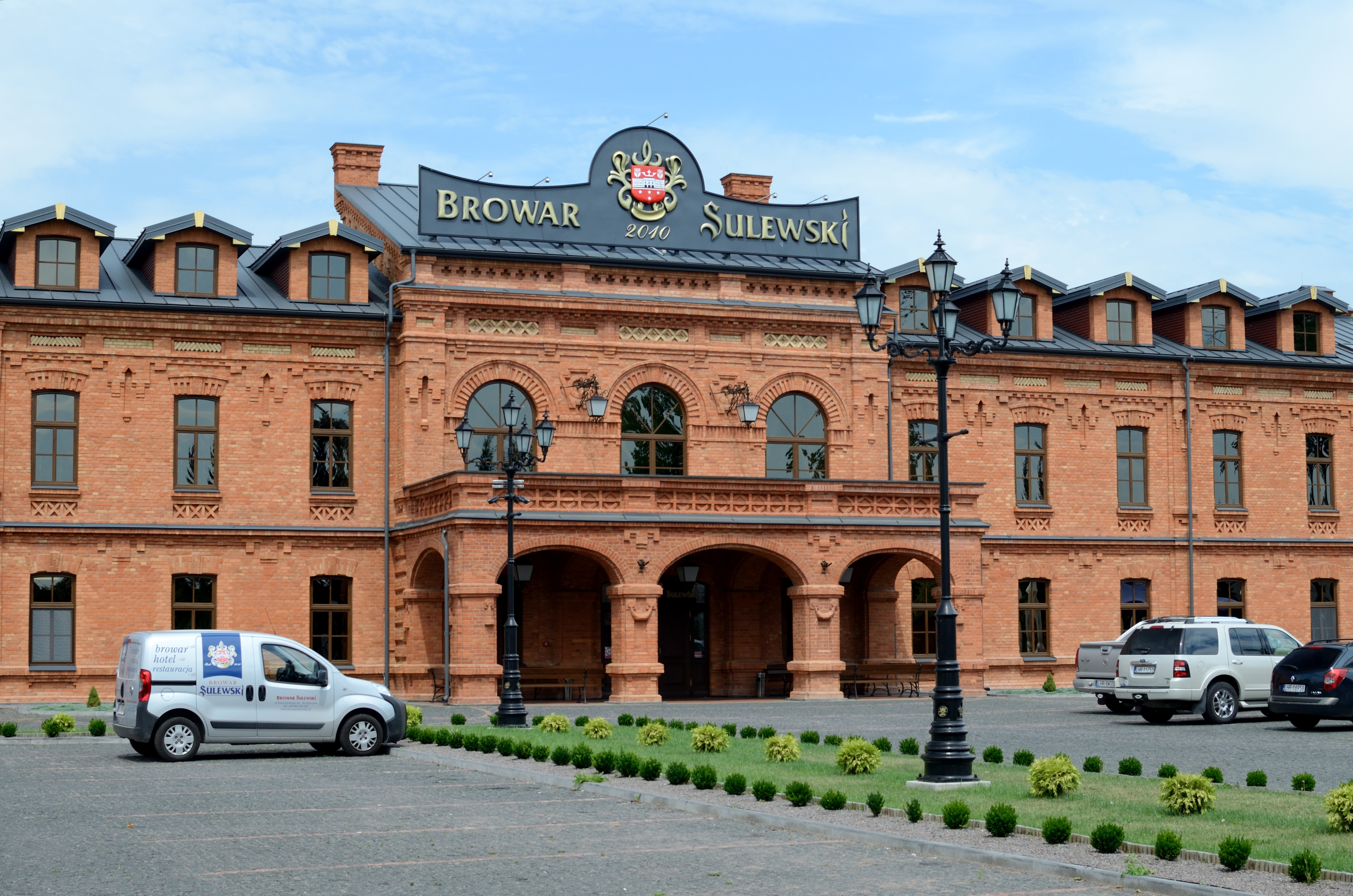
- Browar Sulewski - local brewery

- Flag Coat of arms

- Location within Poland
- Coordinates: 50°49′N 23°53′E
- Country: Poland
- Voivodeship: Lublin
- County: Hrubieszów
- Gmina: Hrubieszów (urban gmina)
- First mentioned: 1254
- Town rights: 1400

Government
  - Mayor: Marta Majewska

Area
  - Total: 33.03 km^{2} (12.75 sq mi)
- Elevation: 200 m (660 ft)

Population (2016)
  - Total: 18,212
  - Density: 551.4/km^{2} (1,428/sq mi)
- Time zone: UTC+1 (CET)
  - Summer (DST): UTC+2 (CEST)
- Postal code: 22-500
- Car plates: LHR
- Website: Official website

Hrubieszów (Note: Polish: [xruˈbjɛʂuf]; Ukrainian: Грубешів, romanized: Hrubeshiv; Yiddish: הרוביעשאָוו, romanized: Hrubyeshov, or רובעשויוו, Ribeshoyv/Rubeshoyv.) is a town in southeastern Poland, with a population of around 18,212 (2016). It is the capital of Hrubieszów County within the Lublin Voivodeship.

Founded in the medieval period and granted town rights by King Władysław II Jagiełło, Hrubieszów is a former royal town of Poland. It was the site of several Polish-Lithuanian congresses and a number of victorious Polish battles. It was home to the oldest cooperative organization in Europe, founded in 1800. Hrubieszów is the birthplace of the Polish writer, novelist and author of popular books Bolesław Prus, and the entrepreneur and Holocaust survivor Henry Orenstein.

Hrubieszów is located on the Huczwa River, some 169 kilometres (105 mi) south-east of the provincial capital Lublin, and is the easternmost town of Poland.

== History ==
=== Early history ===
In the 10th century the area formed part of the Cherven Cities, a territory which was included within the emerging Polish state by its first historic ruler, Mieszko I. It was invaded and annexed from Poland by Kievan Rus' in 981, and afterwards it changed possession several times between Poland and Rus', and even fell to the Mongol Empire in the mid-13th century. The origins of the town go back to the early Middle Ages, when a defensive gord existed on the Huczwa river island. It was first mentioned in 1254, as a hunting settlement located among forests.

In 1366, the area, along with Hrubieszów, then called Rubieszów, was eventually recaptured by King Casimir III the Great, and reintegrated with the Kingdom of Poland. Sometime in the late 14th century, a wooden castle was built here, as a residence of a local governor. Probably in 1400 Rubieszów received a town charter from Polish king Władysław II Jagiełło, who visited it in 1411, 1413 and 1430. A castle and church were later added. King Casimir IV Jagiellon ordered the construction of a route from Lublin to Lwów passing through Rubieszów. Several Polish-Lithuanian congresses were held in Rubieszów. The town was raided several times by the Tatars between 1498 and 1526. In 1672, Tatars raided the town once again, but were eventually defeated by Poles led by John III Sobieski.

=== Late modern period ===
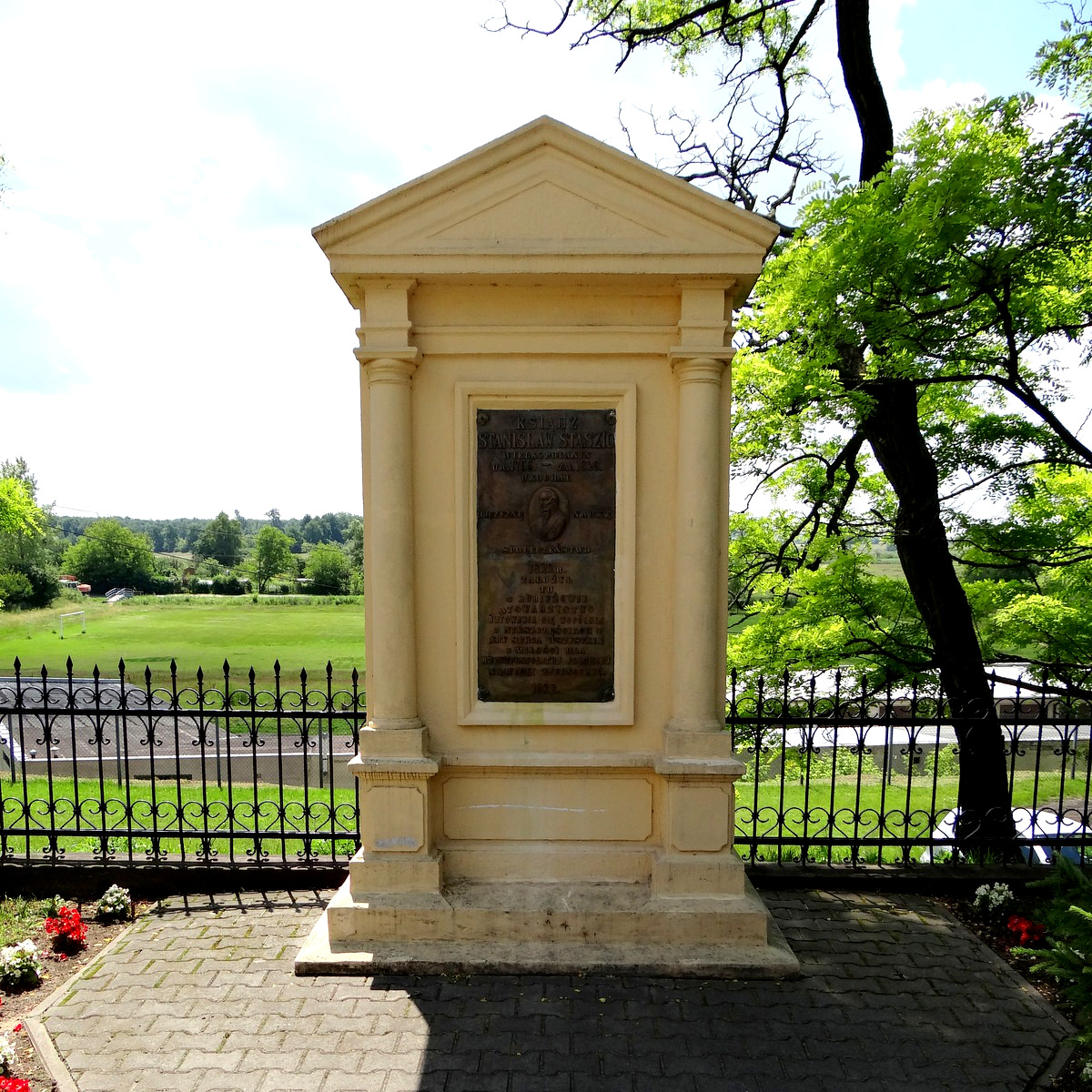
Stanisław Staszic memorial

After the First Partition of Poland in 1772, Hrubieszów was annexed by Austria. In 1800, Stanisław Staszic founded the Hrubieszów Agricultural Society, the first cooperative organization in Europe, which existed until 1945. The name of the town was changed in 1802 from Rubieszów to Hrubieszów. Following the Austro-Polish War of 1809 the town became part of the short-lived Polish Duchy of Warsaw, then in 1815 it became part of Russian-controlled Congress Poland, within the Lublin Governorate. In 1909, its population was 15,000.

Hrubieszów was the site of victorious battles fought by the Poles against Russia during the 19th-century uprisings. First during the November Uprising, on 15 February 1831, the Poles defeated the Russians in Hrubieszów and captured their commander, then at the beginning of the January Uprising, on 23 January 1863, a 400-strong insurgent unit captured the town.

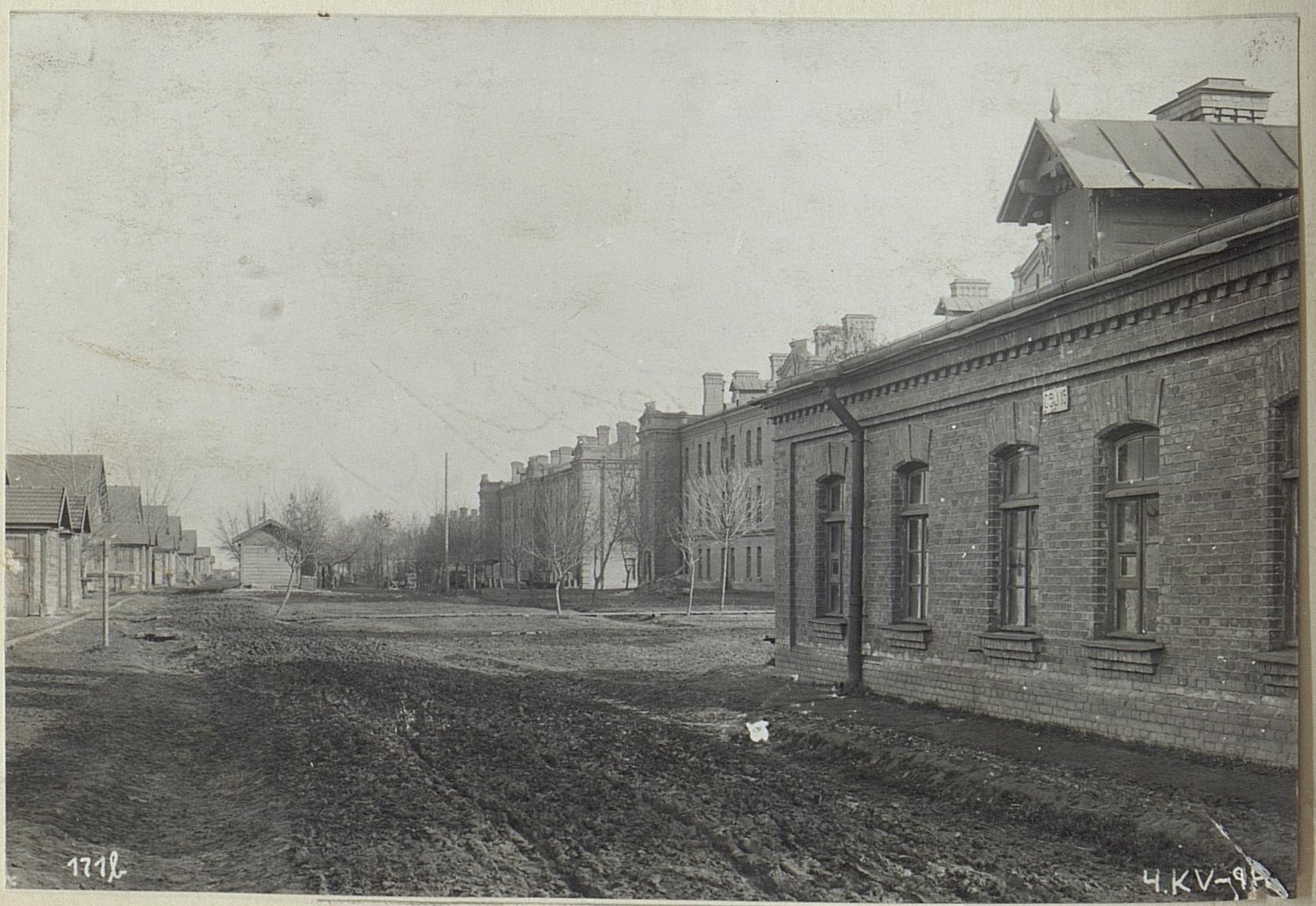
Military barracks in Hrubieszów in 1917

In the final weeks of World War I, in November 1918, a newly formed Polish unit from Chełm liberated the town. It was integrated with the Second Polish Republic, within which it was administratively part of the Lublin Voivodeship. In 1919, the 4th Polish Rifles Regiment was based in Hrubieszów, before relocating to Bełz. During the Polish–Soviet War, in August and September 1920, the Battle of Hrubieszów was fought, won by the Poles. In 1921, the Polish 1st Krechowce Uhlan Regiment was briefly stationed in Hrubieszów, before relocating to Augustów.

=== World War II and post-war period ===
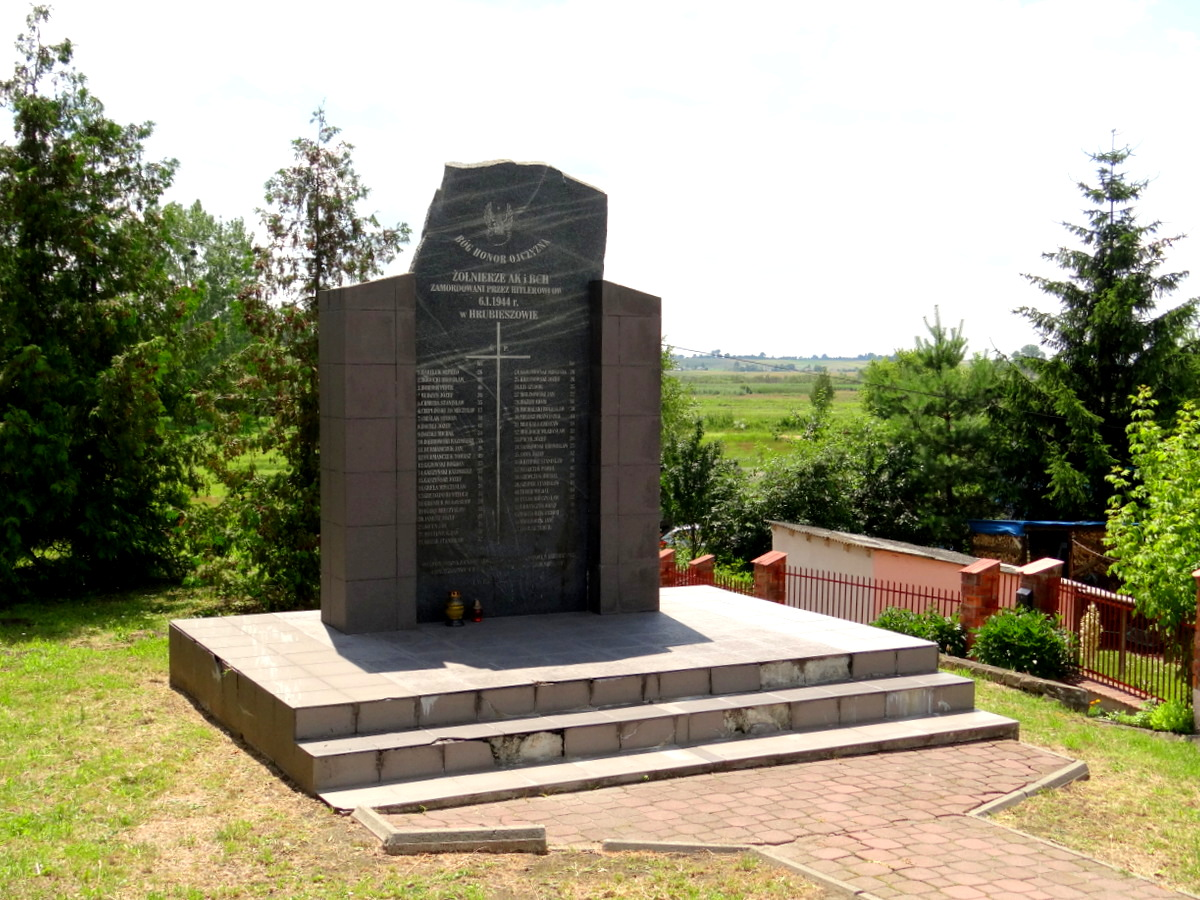
Memorial to local Polish partisans murdered by Nazi Germany in 1944

During the joint German-Soviet invasion of Poland, which started World War II, the German army entered the town on 15 September 1939. Ten days later the Germans withdrew and the Soviet army occupied the town, but after a fortnight returned it to the Germans, in accordance with a new Soviet-German agreement. Over a dozen Poles who were either born, educated or lived and worked in Hrubieszów, including the head of the local Military Recruitment Office, the former mayor and the former deputy starost, were murdered by the Russians in the Katyn massacre in 1940. During the German occupation, the region witnessed the Zamość Uprising. Many inhabitants, including almost all of the 7,000 Jewish residents, were murdered in the Holocaust. In 1944, the German occupation ended, and the town was restored to Poland, although with a Soviet-installed communist regime, which stayed in power until the Fall of Communism in the 1980s.

After World War II, what remained of the town's Ukrainian population was expelled to the Soviet Union. In May 1946, the town was the site of the attack on Hrubieszow, the largest joint action by the partisans of the Polish anti-communist Freedom and Independence movement and those of the Ukrainian Insurgent Army.

Between 1975 and 1998, the town was administratively part of the Zamość Voivodeship.

== Jewish community ==
The Jewish population numbered 709 in 1765, 3,276 in 1856, 5,352 (out of 10,636) in 1897, in 1921, there were 5679, and probably around 7500 in 1939.

During World War II, the German army immediately organized a series of "aktions" after it invaded the town on 15 September 1939. Over 2,000 Jews, having experienced the Nazi German terror, left with the withdrawing Soviet army, which had shortly occupied the town after 25 September 1939. On 2 December 1939, 1,000 Jews from Hrubieszów and 1,100 from Chełm were led on a death march by the Germans to the Bug River. Hundreds were murdered along the way, survivors were forced to try to swim across the Bug to the USSR, but the Soviets denied them entry. The survivors returned to Hrubieszów. In August 1940, German police arrested about 800 Jews and deported 600 to a forced labor camp where about half died. Sometime between the summer of 1940 and June 1942, an occupation ghetto was formed. Both local Jews and those forced to move to Hrubieszów were confined to a fixed area. By April 1942, there were more than 5800 Jews in the ghetto.

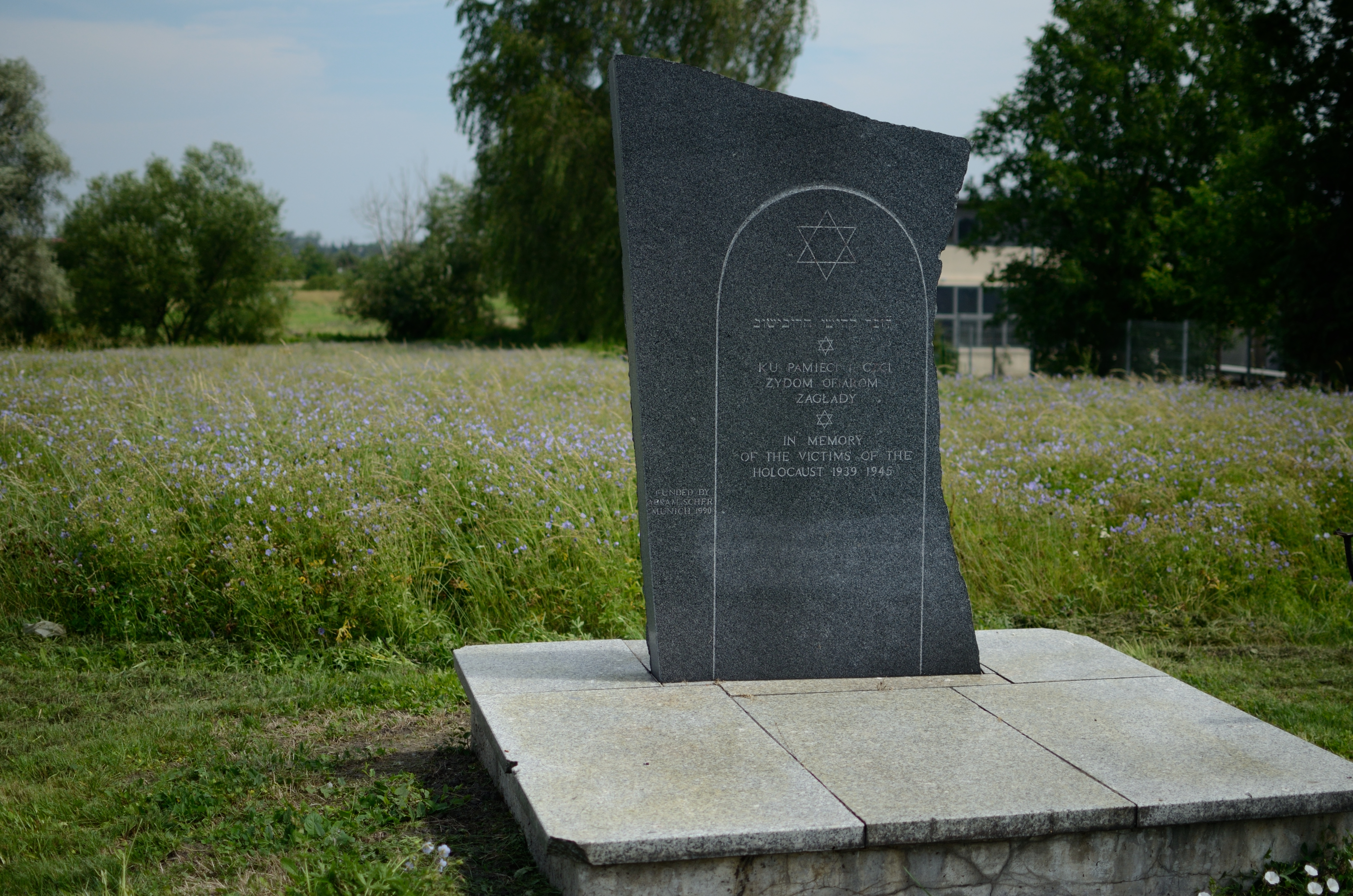
Memorial to Holocaust victims

In June 1942, around 3,000 Jews from the ghetto were rounded up, some were killed in the town, and most were sent to the Sobibor extermination camp where they were all killed. The second deportation from Hrubieszów took place on 28 October 1942, when 2,500 Jews were deported to Sobibor and killed. Around 400 who resisted were executed at the Jewish cemetery and the last 160 Jews were sent to a forced labor camp in Budzyń. About 140 of Hrubieszów's Jews are thought to have survived. They were mostly those who had fled to Soviet controlled territory at the beginning of the war, to cities such as Tashkent. After the events of the war, several Jews went diasporic, going across the world, with reports of at least 2 former inhabitants going to Colombia.

=== Jewish resistance ===
In the summer of 1941, Julek (Joel/Jakób) Brandt, a leader of the Zionist youth movement Betar from Chorzów who was a relative of the chairman of the Hrubieszów Judenrat (Jewish Council), Samuel Brandt, arranged for several hundred members of the Betar youth movement in the Warsaw Ghetto to work on local farms and estates, including one in Dłużniów and Werbkowice. Before the war, the estate in Dłużniów had belonged to Maks Glazermann, a Jewish engineer from Lwów who was left to run the property. Among those sent to Dłużniów was a young woman from Warsaw named Hanka Tauber. Her account of what went on there was recorded in the ghetto diary of Abraham Lewin.

Most of the Betar youth were killed in the spring of 1942 and in subsequent months together with the local Jewish population. A small number, however, managed to return to the ghetto and later took part in the Warsaw Ghetto Uprising of 1943. Julek Brandt escaped from a transport heading for the Sobibor extermination camp. He was denounced by locals who tuned him over to the Gestapo in Hrubieszów. There he was put to work by Gestapo Obersturmbannführer Ebner, who named him chief of a small work camp on Jatkowa Street. At the end of 1942, Brandt was executed by Ebner. Ebner himself was assassinated in December 1942.

== Transport ==
National road 74 runs through the town, continuing to the road border crossing with Ukraine at Zosin-Ustyluh located about 20 km (12 mi) to the east. In 2015 the road was rerouted to a newly built bypass avoiding the town centre. A wide gauge Hrubieszów–Sławków Południowy LHS railway (Broad Gauge Metallurgy Line) runs through the town. A normal gauge railway runs parallel to it, which carries two pairs of PKP Intercity trains, first through southern Poland to Jelenia Góra and second through northern-central Poland to Piła. Lublin Airport is the closest international airport, located about 120 km (75 mi) away by road.

== Heritage sights and monuments ==
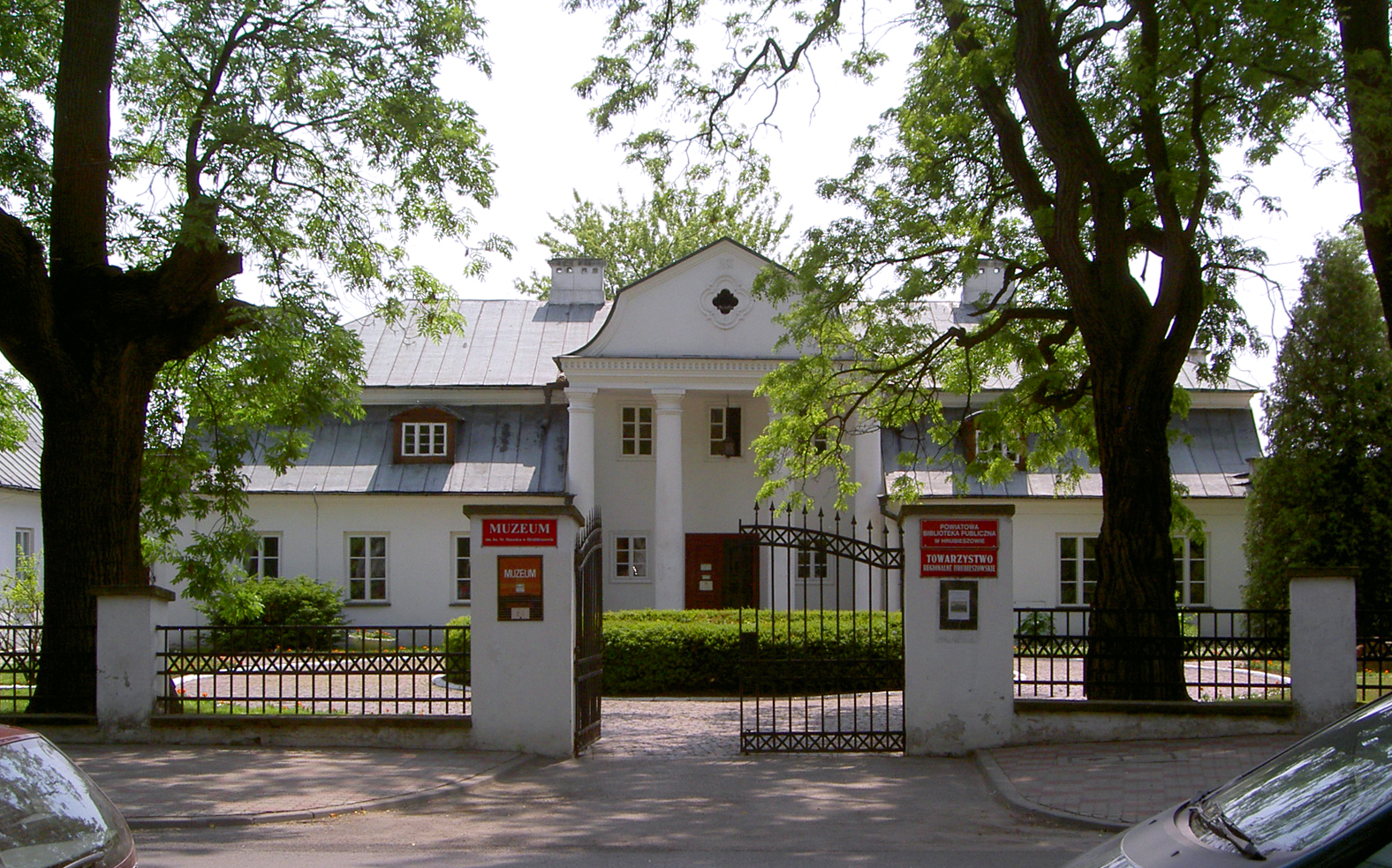
Du Château Mansion, a regional museum

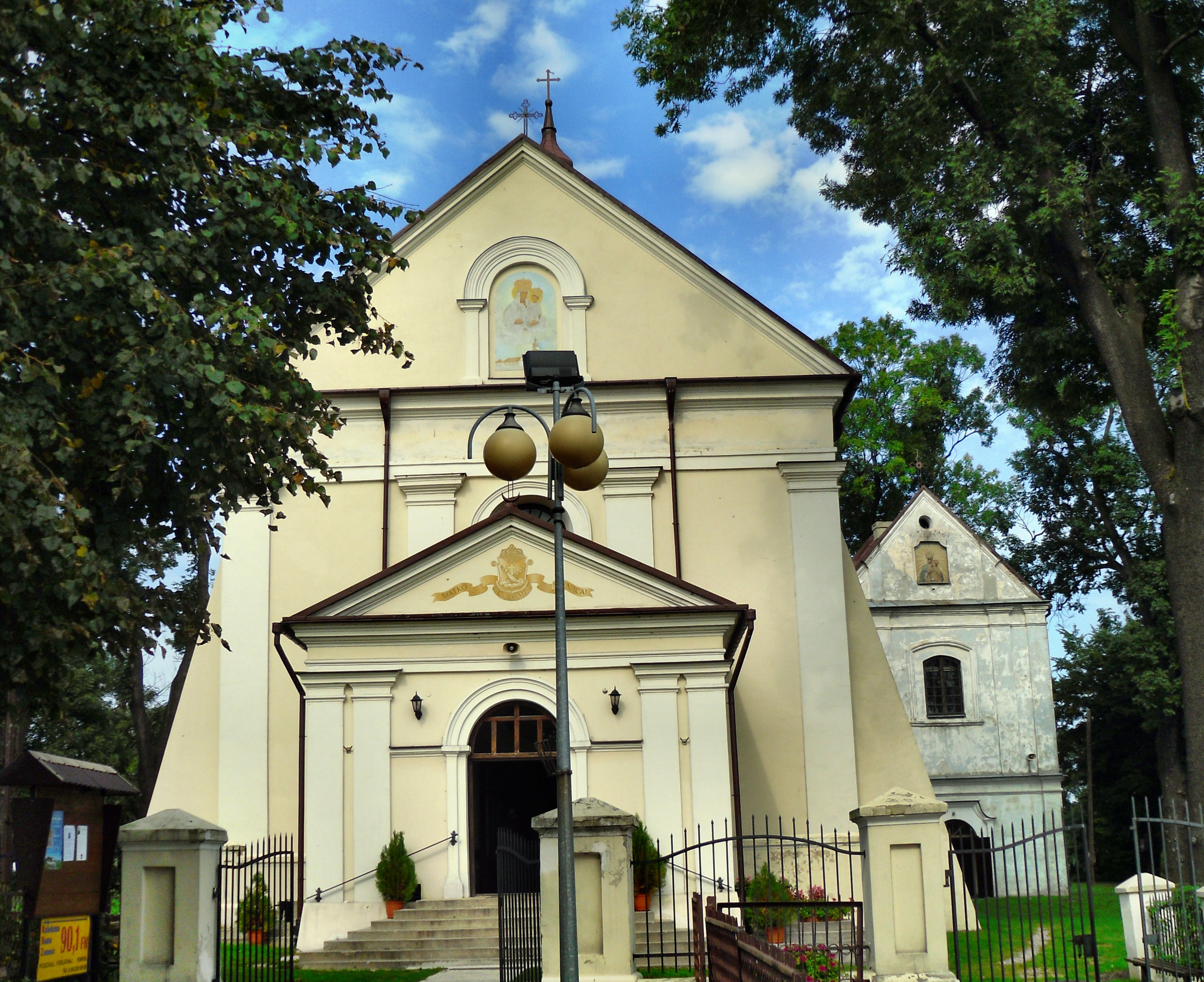
Saint Stanislaus Kostka church

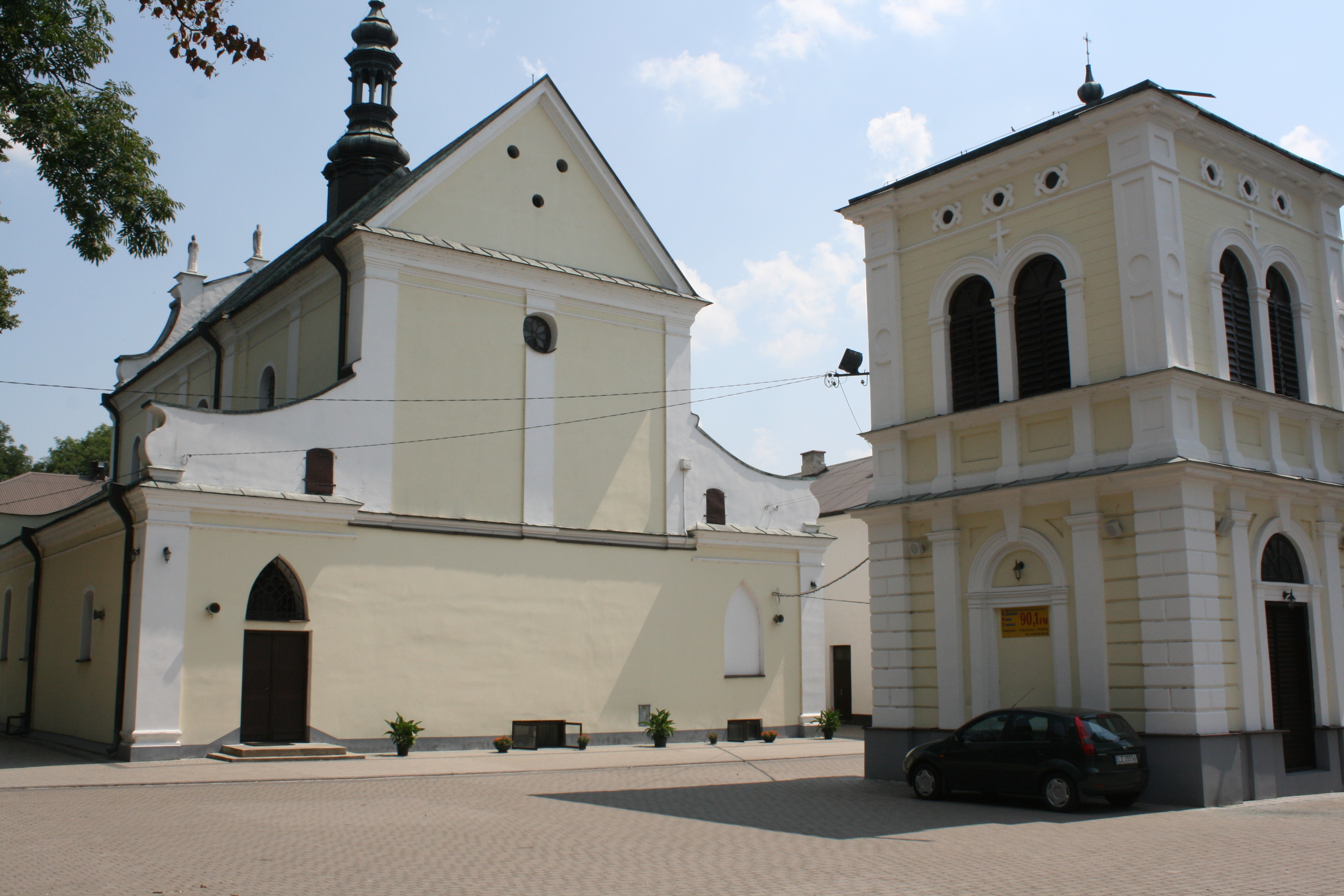
Saint Nicholas church

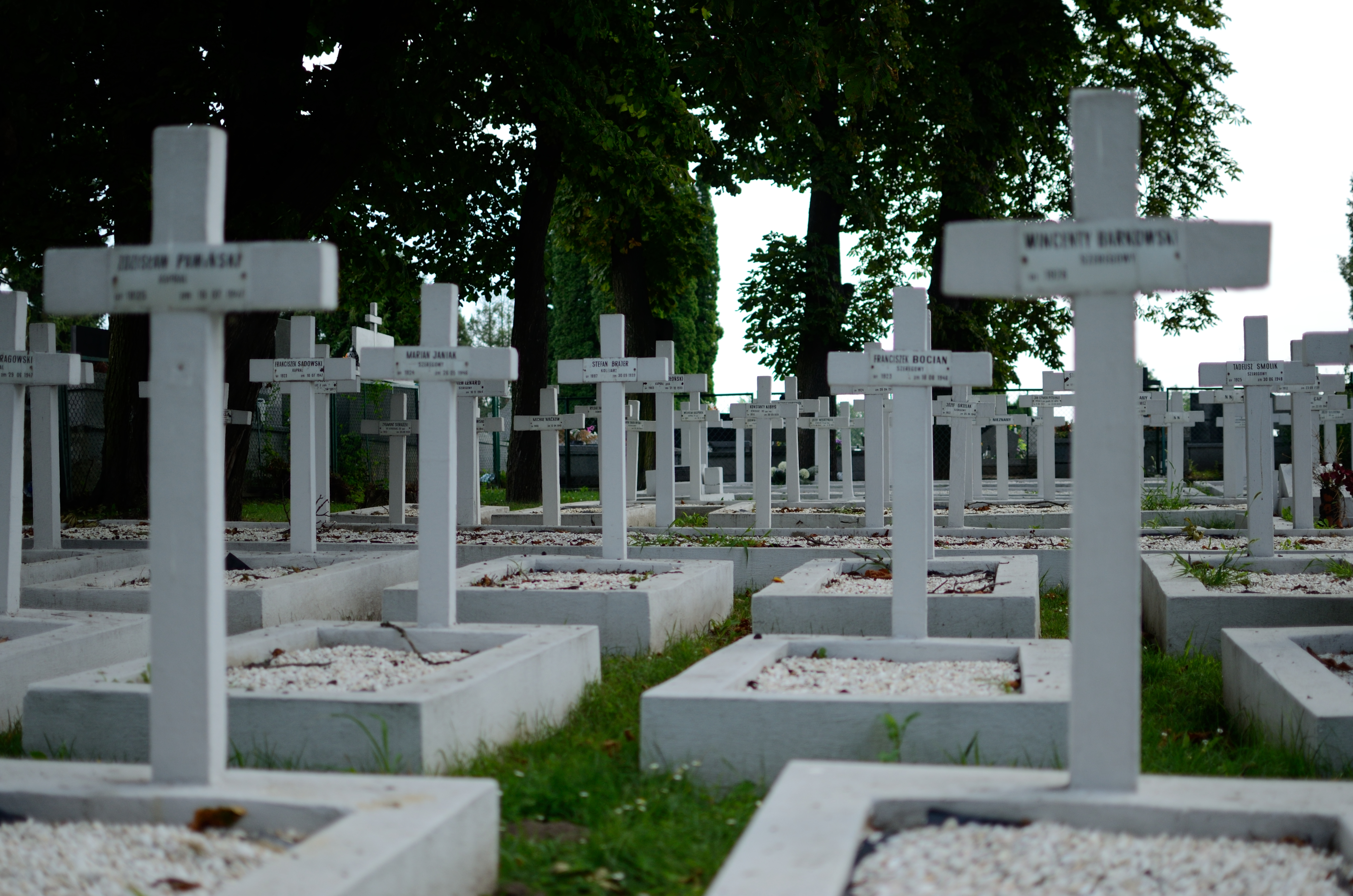
Polish military quarter

Monuments in Hrubieszów include:

- Baroque Saint Nicholas Catholic Church (17th-century)
- Birthplace of writer Bolesław Prus
- Du Château manor complex, housing a regional museum
- Baroque Saint Stanislaus Kostka Church, Sanctuary of Madonna of Sokal
- Church of the Dormition of the Mother of God with 13 cupolas (1875)
- Our Lady of Perpetual Help Catholic Church (1903-5)
- Memorial to local Polish partisans of the Home Army and Peasant Battalions murdered by Nazi Germany in 1944
- Memorial to Stanisław Staszic
- An outdoor sculpture of Bolesław Prus
- Catholic cemetery with a Polish military quarter
- Jewish cemeteries (Old and New) with memorials to Holocaust victims.

== Sports ==
Unia Hrubieszów sports club is based in Hrubieszów, with football, athletics and weightlifting sections.

== Notable people ==
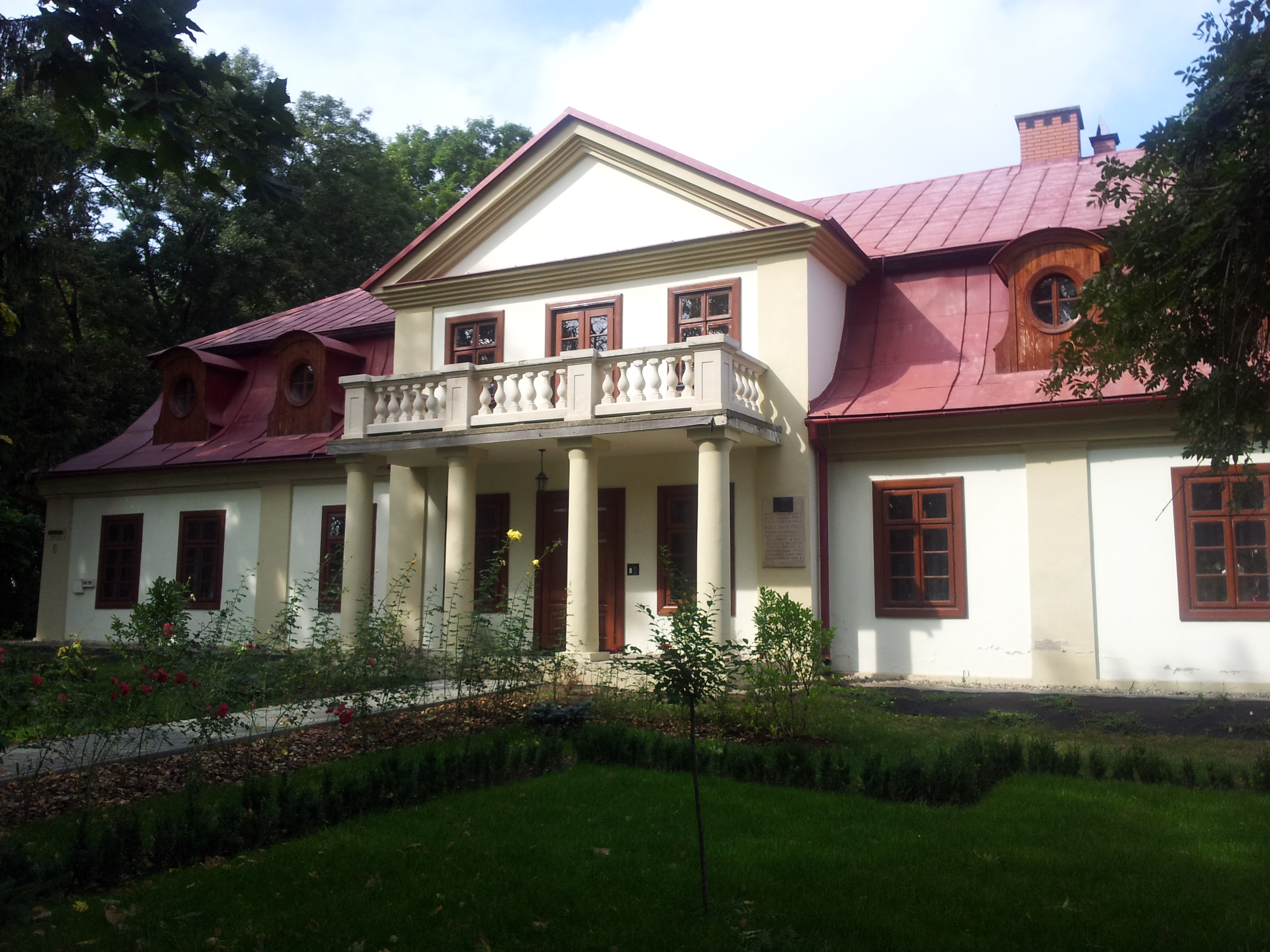
Birthplace of Bolesław Prus

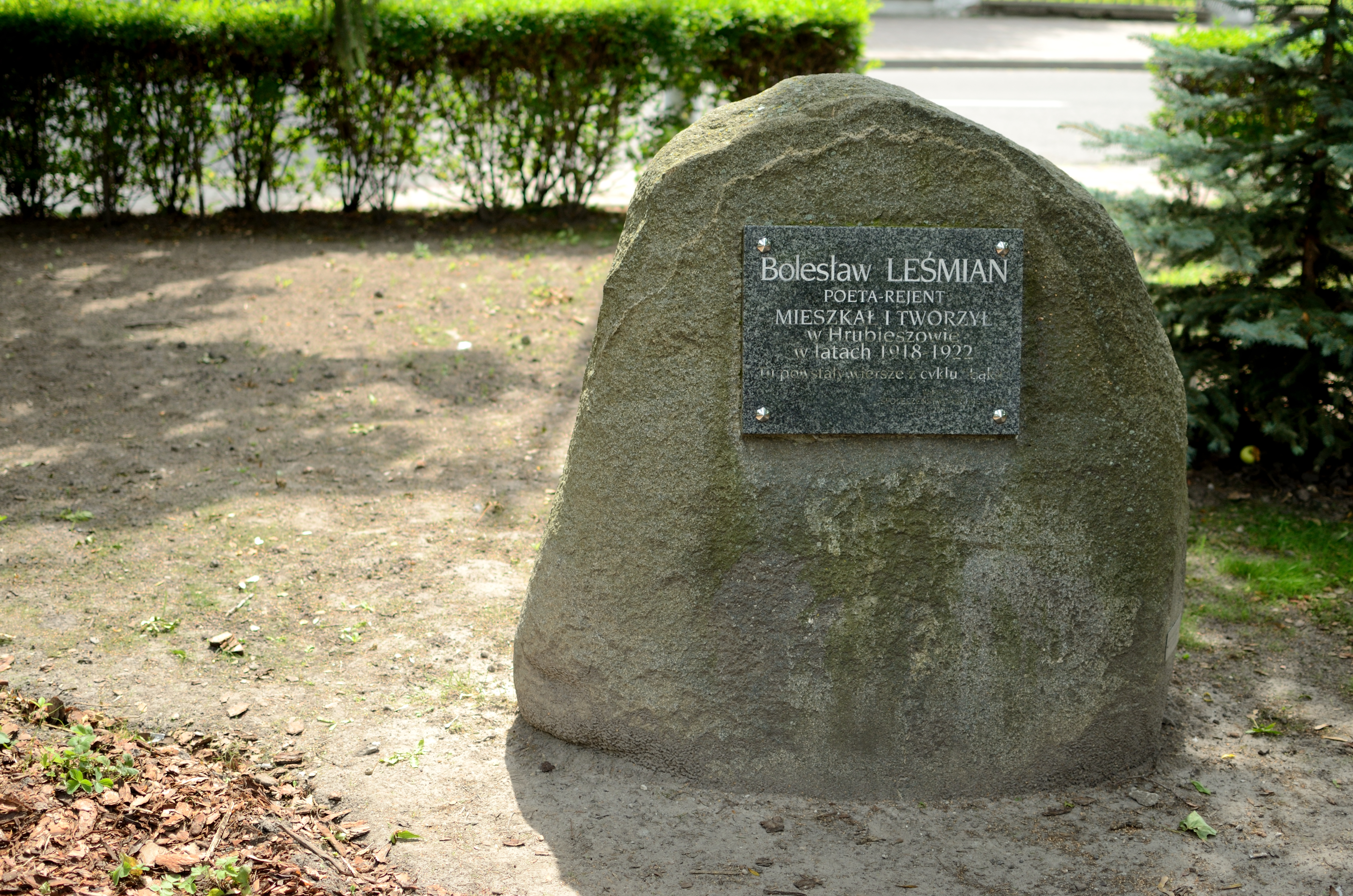
Memorial stone to Bolesław Leśmian

Notable residents of Hrubieszów have included:

- Abraham Stern (1762–1842), inventor
- Yosef Almogi (1910–1991), member of the Israeli Knesset, Israeli Minister of Housing, Israeli Minister of Development, and Israeli Minister of Labor
- Bolesław Leśmian (1877–1937), poet
- Henry Orenstein (1923–2021), toymaker, poker player, author, and entrepreneur
- Bolesław Prus (1847–1912), novelist
- Milton Rokeach (1918–1988), psychologist

Others with ancestry from the city include:

- David Mamet (born 1947), American playwright
- Zalman Shazar (1889–1974), third President of Israel

== See also ==
- List of cities and towns in Poland
