= Participation of Ukrainians in the suppression of the Warsaw Uprising =

Ukrainian collaboration with Nazi Germany to quash liberation of Warsaw

Participation of Ukrainians in the suppression of the Warsaw Uprising refers to the involvement of Ukrainian collaborators in German service in quelling the Warsaw Uprising in 1944.

This issue evokes strong emotions in Poland and has also been surrounded by many myths and distortions. In the summer of 1944, there was a widespread belief among the residents of Warsaw, fueled by the uprising's press and propaganda, that units composed of Ukrainians played a crucial role in the pacification of the Polish capital. They were also said to have committed particularly brutal war crimes. This belief became ingrained in Polish historical memory, reflected in post-war accounts and testimonies, in some historical works, and in both memoir literature and fiction.

Germans employed numerous collaborationist units made up of former Soviet citizens and residents of Eastern Borderlands to suppress the uprising. Among them were also units composed of Ukrainians, the largest of which was the Ukrainian Legion of Self-Defense. Nevertheless, Ukrainian collaborators played a marginal role in the suppression of the uprising and the accompanying crimes.

== Ukrainian collaborationist units fighting in Warsaw in the summer of 1944 ==
=== In the Warsaw garrison ===
According to the findings of Polish and German historians, on 1 August 1944, two units composed of Ukrainians were stationed in Warsaw:

- a police company in the area of Szucha Avenue, within the so-called police district. It numbered from 80 to 150 men;
- a company-sized unit located in the building of the School of Political Sciences at 56 Wawelska Street in Ochota. It comprised no more than 150 men.

Additionally, around 40 Ukrainians were part of the Pawiak prison staff, and an unspecified number served in the ranks of the industrial police (Werkschutzpolizei).

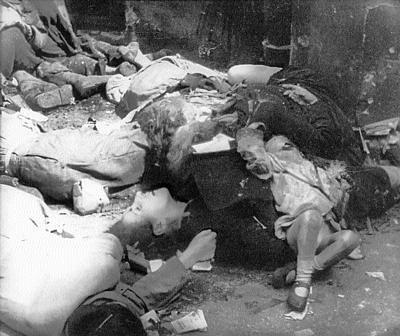
Victims of executions at 111 Marszałkowska Street

According to Grzegorz Motyka and Hubert Kuberski, there is no convincing evidence indicating that Ukrainian companies committed murders against the Polish civilian population. This especially pertains to the members of the unit stationed at Wawelska Street, who, according to Motyka, "did not stand out in any particular way". On the other hand, in the situational report by the commander of the Warsaw District of the Home Army, General Albin Skroczyński, codenamed Łaszcz, it was noted that Ukrainians from the territories of the Ukrainian SSR were part of the crew of a German armored car that carried out the massacre of several dozen residents of the tenements at 109, 111, and 113 Marszałkowska Street on 3 August 1944. This information was reportedly obtained during the interrogation of the captured perpetrators. For this reason, some Polish historians were inclined to assume that among those responsible for this crime were Ukrainian policemen stationed in the area of Szucha Avenue.

Many issues concerning these companies and their actions remain unclear. Hubert Kuberski points out that it cannot be ruled out that the Ukrainian company from Szucha Avenue might be confused with the Belarusian 13th Auxiliary Police Battalion (Schutzmannschafts-Bataillon der Sicherheitspolizei 13), which had been present in the "police district" at least since August 3. Meanwhile, the only source indicating the presence of Ukrainians in the School of Political Sciences is the account of Lieutenant Jerzy Modro, codenamed Rarańcza, deputy commander of the Wawelska Redoubt, which is cited in the monograph by Adam Borkiewicz.

=== Ukrainian Legion of Self-Defense ===
The largest cohesive Ukrainian unit that the German command sent to Warsaw was the Ukrainian Legion of Self-Defense (Ukrainian: Український Легіон Самооборони), also known by its German name, Schützmannschaft Bataillon der Sipo 31.

The order to participate in the suppression of the Polish uprising reached the legion in the second half of August 1944. At that time, there was a tense atmosphere within the unit, caused by the earlier decision of the Germans to transfer it from the partially populated by Ukrainians areas of the Bug river to ethnically Polish regions around Miechów. The political leadership of the Ukrainian Legion of Self-Defense opposed the order to go to Warsaw, believing it would distance the prospect of fighting for Ukraine's independence and reduce the legion solely to the role of a German police unit. As a result, one of the political leaders of the Ukrainian Legion of Self-Defense, Mychajło Sołtys, codenamed Czerkas, went missing, most likely arrested and murdered by the Gestapo. Another leader, Wołodymyr Trojan, deserted, having previously unsuccessfully called on Ukrainian Legion of Self-Defense members to follow his example. Ultimately, as a show of force, the Germans surrounded Bukowska Wola, where the legion was stationed. The Ukrainian unit was then disbanded, and a select group of policemen was formed into a combat detachment, which was sent to Warsaw. Colonel Petro Dyachenko, an officer recently assigned to the Ukrainian Legion of Self-Defense, who, according to some sources, had strong ties to the German Sicherheitsdienst, was put in charge of it.

Along with Dyachenko, about one-third of the Ukrainian Legion of Self-Defense personnel went to Warsaw; they were likely volunteers or individuals selected by the German command as "troublemakers". According to German sources, 219 policemen participated in the suppression of the uprising, while Hubert Kuberski estimates their number to be around 400.

The Ukrainian Legion of Self-Defense most likely arrived in Warsaw at the beginning of September 1944 and fought there for about 2 to 3 weeks. However, determining the exact course of its military path poses a number of difficulties. It is probable that the legionnaires initially took part in the German assault on Powiśle, occupying positions in the area of what was then 6 Sierpnia Street or along Rozbrat Street. Subsequently, from August 13, they participated in the fighting in Solec. It is possible that the Ukrainian Legion of Self-Defense held positions between the present-day Marshal Edward Rydz-Śmigły Park and the Vistula river, from where they advanced north towards Wilanowska and Ludna streets. However, it is also possible that they were initially dug in at the Wybrzeże Kościuszkowskie Street before being transferred to the area east of Frascati Street. Their opponents at that time were soldiers of the Home Army from the Radosław Group and/or the Kryska Group, as well as units of the First Polish Army which landed at the western bank of Vistula.

According to German data, from 4 to 13 September, the Ukrainian Legion of Self-Defense suffered losses of 10 killed and 34 wounded (20% of its personnel). However, legionnaires interrogated after the war estimated their unit's losses at around 20 to 30 killed. Hubert Kuberski suspects that the Ukrainian Legion of Self-Defense must have suffered the greatest losses during the fighting in Solec.

Among the war crimes committed by the Germans and their collaborators in Warsaw, the policemen from the Ukrainian Legion of Self-Defense can undoubtedly be attributed only one: the rape and murder of three Polish women at 23 Bednarska Street. They were also accused of murdering patients and staff at one of the insurgent hospitals in Solec, but due to the fact that the source of this accusation is a propaganda publication issued after the war in the Soviet Union, it cannot be considered fully credible. However, it cannot be entirely dismissed either, as it is possible that the author of this publication had access to testimony protocols from former legionnaires held in the KGB archives.

After the fighting in Powiśle ended, the unit was transferred to the Leszno area on the outskirts of the Kampinos Forest. The task of the Ukrainian Legion of Self-Defense from then on was to combat the Kampinos Group. Initially, the Ukrainian policemen formed part of the cordon surrounding the forest. From September 27, they participated in the anti-partisan operation Sternschnuppe.

On 24 September 1944, during their stay on the outskirts of the forest, the Ukrainian Legion of Self-Defense carried out the pacification of the village of Zaborówek. Ukrainian policemen killed two Poles and arrested another 49. They also burned down 26 farmsteads directly in the pacified village and five more near their place of accommodation.

=== In the ranks of other German and collaborationist formations ===
In the first half of September 1944, the 34th Police Rifle Regiment (Polizei Schützen Regiment 34) was part of Korpsgruppe von dem Bach. Of the three battalions in this regiment, two (the II and III) had a mixed character, meaning they included Ukrainian volunteers, while the officer cadre was composed of Germans. By mid-September, there were a total of 982 foreign volunteers serving in the regiment. By the end of that month, the regiment participated in Operation Sternschnuppe in the Kampinos Forest. In October, after the fall of the uprising, part of the regiment took part in a large sweep conducted in the deserted city to capture those hiding among the ruins, referred to as Robinson Crusoes of Warsaw.

Around 40–50 Ukrainian volunteers served in the horse-mounted reconnaissance platoon of the SS-Sonderbataillon Dirlewanger in 1943. This unit was later incorporated into the 1st Company of the Mixed Battalion when the formation was expanded and redesignated as the SS-Sturmbrigade Dirlewanger on 11 November 1944. This unit primarily consisted of German criminals, poachers, and soldiers and SS members sentenced for disciplinary offenses. In July 1944, foreign volunteers made up only 10% of the regiment's personnel, with this group including Ukrainians and Russians. Available sources do not allow for an accurate assessment of the scale of participation of these collaborators in the crimes committed in Warsaw by the Dirlewanger unit.

Individual Ukrainians served in the largest collaborationist unit deployed to suppress the uprising, namely the Kaminski Brigade (Waffen-Sturm-Brigade der SS RONA). However, this unit was predominantly Russian in character. (Note: Marszalec (2001, pp. 66–68) points out: "In RONA, there were exclusively Russians; if there were also Ukrainians and Belarusians, it was in an imperceptible percentage".)

=== Galicia Division's involvement in suppressing the uprising ===
Contrary to the widely held opinion in Poland, historians have undeniably established that the 14th Waffen Grenadier Division of the SS, composed of Ukrainians (14. Galizische SS-Freiwilligen-Division, commonly known as the Galicia Division), did not participate in the suppression of the uprising as a separate combat unit. This division was encircled and destroyed by the Red Army between 20 and 22 July 1944 near Brody. By August 3 of that year, its remnants had been concentrated around the town of Serednie, and by the end of that month, plans for its reconstruction began at the Neuhammer training ground in Lower Silesia.

There is also no evidence to support the claim that the Germans deployed the reserve regiment of the Galicia Division against Warsaw or any of the police regiments formed from volunteers for this unit.

However, it is possible that individual soldiers from the Galicia Division fought in Warsaw in the summer of 1944. On the eve of the uprising, cadets from this division were attending an officer course at the SS officer school in Owińska (SS-Junkerschule Braunschweig–Posen–Treskau). After August 1, a company was formed from the school's trainees, which was part of an improvised police group from the Wartheland, commanded by SS-Gruppenführer Heinz Reinefarth. Several Ukrainian cadets (Ukrainian sources mention 10) were included in Reinefarth's group, serving as translators. It is uncertain whether they participated in the Wola massacre in the early days of August, but they were likely aware of the ongoing atrocities in that district. (Note: One of the few sources suggesting the involvement of Ukrainian cadets in the massacres in Wola is the account of Zofia Staworzyńska, who survived the mass execution at the "Ursus" factory on 55 Wolska Street. In her post-war testimony, Staworzyńska claimed that she spoke with a Ukrainian present at the execution site, who was translating her words to the Germans (Motyka (2006, p. 120)).)

Some Polish publications state that the 14th Waffen Grenadier Division of the SS included the previously mentioned Ukrainian company stationed at the School of Political Sciences in Ochota. The only source of this information is the account of Second Lieutenant Jerzy Modro, codenamed Rarańcza, cited by Adam Borkiewicz in his monograph. On August 4, documents found beside the body of the killed non-commissioned officer Rarańcza indicated that he had served in the Galicia Division. Some historians question this account; however, Grzegorz Motyka is inclined to consider it credible. He believes it is possible that this unit served, for example, as a non-commissioned officer school for the division.

== Ukrainians in the insurgent Warsaw ==
On 1 August 1944, there were probably between 4,000 and 5,000 Ukrainians in Warsaw. After the uprising began, Ukrainians accused of collaborating with the Germans were detained by the National Security Corps officers and subsequently imprisoned in detention centers and internment camps. There were likely instances of overzealousness and abuse; for example, Grzegorz Motyka points to the detention and beating of the head of the public library, Łew Bykowśkij. (Note: He was released after a few weeks thanks to the efforts of Polish acquaintances (Motyka (2006, p. 123)).) Interned Ukrainians were assigned to various tasks, including clearing rubble in the city.

During the uprising, several hundred Ukrainians likely lost their lives. Some were murdered by the Germans. Individuals of Ukrainian nationality were among the victims of the execution carried out on August 1 behind the Cathedral of St. Mary Magdalene in Praga, as well as among the clergy and parishioners from the Orthodox parish of St. John Climacus, who were killed during the Wola massacre. At least one Ukrainian fell while fighting in the ranks of the Home Army.

== Origins of the myth ==
When the Warsaw Uprising broke out, frontline units of the Wehrmacht and SS on the central section of the Eastern Front were engaged in heavy fighting against the advancing Red Army. As a result, the German command was forced to send primarily improvised alarm units and combat groups to Warsaw, formed from cadets of military and police schools, as well as members of reserve, training, and police battalions. Numerous collaborationist formations, consisting of Russians, Cossacks, Belarusians, Azeris, and residents of Central Asia, were also designated to suppress the Polish uprising. Among them were also a few units made up of Ukrainians.

The origins of the myth about the numerous participation of Ukrainians in the suppression of the uprising date back to the first days of August 1944. Residents of Warsaw and insurgents who encountered soldiers from Eastern volunteer formations were generally unable to recognize the languages they spoke or correctly identify the uniforms and insignia they wore. At the same time, the population of the capital was strongly influenced by earlier information about the crimes committed by Ukrainian nationalists in the Eastern Borderlands. An important role was also played by the negative stereotype of Ukrainians shaped over centuries. Consequently, the Eastern collaborators suppressing the Warsaw Uprising were collectively referred to as "Ukrainians". The only exception were soldiers from Central Asia, who were referred to as "Kalmyks". (Note: This is also an incorrect term, as none of the collaborationist units suppressing the Warsaw Uprising were composed of Kalmyks (Kuberski (2017, pp. 218–219)).)

From the very first days of the uprising, the insurgent press of various factions regularly disseminated information about allegedly numerous Ukrainian units fighting in Warsaw, including the Galicia Division. It also reported on the cruel crimes that Ukrainian collaborators were said to have committed. For instance, on 3 August 1944, a note published in Biuletyn Informacyjny accused Ukrainians living in the city of recruiting snipers who were firing at insurgents and civilians. Meanwhile, on August 20, the same publication described Ukrainians as "the most brutal instrument of enemy terror in Warsaw". Following the insurgent press, similar information appeared in Polish publications issued in the United Kingdom. Grzegorz Motyka does not rule out that the accusations against Ukrainians were politically motivated, reflecting a reluctance to expose the participation of Russian collaborationist units in suppressing the uprising – especially as assistance from the Soviet Union was expected for the fighting Warsaw.

As a result, the image of Ukrainians suppressing the Warsaw Uprising and committing brutal murders, rapes, and robberies became firmly entrenched in Polish historical memory. Information on this topic appeared frequently in testimonies and accounts from Polish witnesses. It can also be found in memoir literature and even in some historical works. In particular, Ukrainians were attributed crimes committed by the predominantly Russian Kaminski Brigade, as well as crimes perpetrated by Azerbaijani and "Eastern Muslim" subunits.

Another common error repeated in witness accounts and in post-war Polish publications was the designation of soldiers from Eastern volunteer formations as "Vlasovites". In reality, the first units of the Russian Liberation Army of the Committee for the Liberation of the Peoples of Russia, commanded by General Andrey Vlasov, were not formed until November 1944, after the suppression of the Warsaw Uprising. It even occurred that the terms "Ukrainian" and "Vlasovite" were used interchangeably; for example, Janusz Marszalec cites the testimony of one witness to the Ochota massacre, who described the perpetrators as "soldiers of the Ukrainian Kaminski Brigade, so-called Vlasovites".

In Ukrainian historiography, there have occasionally been tendencies to minimize the participation of Ukrainian units in suppressing the Warsaw Uprising or even to deny it entirely.

== Bibliography ==
- Krannhals, Hanns (2017). Powstanie Warszawskie 1944 [Warsaw Uprising 1944] (in Polish). Warsaw: Bellona. ISBN 978-83-11-15049-2.
- Kuberski, Hubert (2017). "Nieniemieccy ochotnicy w Ostheer, Waffen SS i policji walczący w rejonie Warszawy oraz podczas tłumienia Powstania Warszawskiego (lipiec–październik 1944 roku)" [Non-German Volunteers in the Ostheer, Waffen SS, and Police Fighting in the Warsaw Area and During the Suppression of the Warsaw Uprising (July–October 1944)]. In Szymoniczek, Joanna (ed.). Jak patrzeć na Polskę, Niemcy i świat? Księga jubileuszowa profesora Eugeniusza Cezarego Króla [How to View Poland, Germany, and the World? A Jubilee Book of Professor Eugeniusz Cezary Król] (in Polish). Warsaw: Bellona. ISBN 978-83-11-10292-7.
- Kuberski, Hubert (2021). "Walki SS-Sonderregiment Dirlewanger o Wolę a egzekucje zbiorowe ludności cywilnej" [Fighting of SS-Sonderregiment Dirlewanger for Wola and the Mass Executions of the Civilian Population]. Dzieje Najnowsze (in Polish). LIII (I). ISSN 0419-8824.
- Ludność cywilna w powstaniu warszawskim [The Civilian Population in the Warsaw Uprising] (in Polish). Vol. II. Warsaw: Państwowy Instytut Wydawniczy. 1974.
- Majewski, Marcin (2005). "Przyczynek do wojennych dziejów Ukraińskiego Legionu Samoobrony (1943–1945)" [Contributions to the War History of the Ukrainian Self-Defense Legion (1943–1945)]. Pamięć i Sprawiedliwość (in Polish). 4 (8). ISSN 1427-7476.
- Marszalec, Janusz (4 August 2001). "Z Krzyżem Świętego Jerzego" [With the Cross of Saint George]. Polityka (in Polish). 31 (2309).
- Motyka, Grzegorz (2006). "Prawda i mity o udziale Ukraińców w zwalczaniu Powstania Warszawskiego" [Truth and Myths about the Participation of Ukrainians in Suppressing the Warsaw Uprising]. In Krajewski, Kazimierz; Łabuszewski, Tomasz (eds.). Powstanie Warszawskie. Fakty i mity [Warsaw Uprising: Facts and Myths] (in Polish). Warsaw: Instytut Pamięci Narodowej. ISBN 83-60464-03-0.
