= Mariusz Sowiński =

Polish serial killer and rapist

- Born: 26 March 1976 (age 50); Jarosławiec, Poland
- Other name: "The Stefankowice Vampire"
- Conviction: Murder
- Penalty: 50 years in prison

Details
- Victims: 4
- Span of crimes: 1994–1997
- Country: Poland

Mariusz Sowiński (born 26 March 1976) is a Polish serial killer, rapist, and zoophile known as The Stefankowice Vampire. In the years 1994 to 1997, he raped and killed four women.

== Crimes ==
Sowiński committed his first murder in 1994 in Stefankowice, in which he raped and murdered Zofia K. before throwing her body down a well. His next attack was a year later; in Kułakowice, he raped Antonina E., and to erase any traces he set her house on fire. The woman later died in hospital from her injuries. In August 1996, in a garden plot in Hrubieszów he raped and stabbed Wiesława Ł. His last murder was on the night of 31 August to 1 September 1997; in Stefankowice, Genowefa S., a resident of the village, was raped and then strangled with a cable.

== Victims ==
Nmb.	Name	Age	Date of murder	Place of murder
1.	Zofia K.	63	9 October 1994	Stefankowice
2.	Antonina E.	80	26 November 1995	Kułakowice
3.	Wiesława Ł.	36	5 August 1996	Hrubieszów
4.	Genowefa S.	67	31 August 1997	Stefankowice

== Investigation and arrest ==
The initial suspect was a man named Kazimierz P., who served 19 months in prison. On the trail of Sowiński, the police had already fallen off in September 1997. He was a conscript soldier in the Nadwślańskie units of the Ministry of Interior and Administration in Sanok. During the interrogations, without any embarrassment or emotion, he confessed to the crimes. This, combined with other evidence gathered, was enough to prosecute him.

== Trial and sentence ==
The trial began in autumn 1998 in Zamość and from the very beginning was accompanied by great emotions. In October, during the first trial, the father of Wiesława Ł., one of Sowiński's victims, attacked him with an axe smuggled to court, wounding him in the back. Sowiński went to the hospital and the attacker was detained. However, thanks to the intercession of the voivodes of Zamość and the protests of his neighbours, he was released. After he recovered, his case was resumed. The prosecutor's office accused him of quadruple murder and rape. To emphasize how dangerous and deranged he was, the prosecutor cited that after one of the killings he killed the owner's cows and then began to interact sexually with their corpses. The accused himself refused to give explanations, he only said he was innocent. His advocate tried to prove that Sowiński could not be convicted because he was mentally ill. 20 experts in the field of psychology and sexology were appointed in his case. Everyone clearly stated that he was fully sane, and his deviations could be even deeper. The prosecutor's office demanded the penalty of life imprisonment with the possibility of conditional release after 50 years. In 2000, the District Court of Zamość sentenced him to the highest penalty. The Court of Appeal in Lublin also upheld it on the grounds that Sowiński posed a threat to the environment. A year later, as a result of the cassation of Sowiński, the Supreme Court quashed the verdict and remitted it for re-examination. In 2002, the District Court of Zamość imposed on him life imprisonment with the possibility of conditional release after serving 50 years of imprisonment. In 2003, the Court of Appeal in Lublin finally upheld the sentence.

== Punishment ==
Sowiński is serving a sentence in the Rzeszów-Załęże Criminal Facility, in a one-person cell in the therapeutic ward. He repeatedly sued in court during the sanction: against the father of one of his victims, who attacked him with an axe when he was led to the courtroom, from whom he demanded PLN 13,000 for "moral damage and losses"; against two policemen who escorted him - demanded PLN 80,000 for "not providing him with adequate protection", and PLN 360 for "damaged clothing". In another case, against the District Prosecutor of Zamość, he demanded PLN 500,000 in compensation for "the prosecutor being rude and did not allow him to get acquainted with the case file". Sowiński brought his last action in 2010 against Radio Lublin. For using the term "vampire", he demanded compensation from the radio for PLN 500,000. All actions brought by Sowiński were validly dismissed.

While serving the penalty, he completed a journeyman's course in the profession of a basket-maker.

Since 2004, he has consistently sought a pardon from successive presidents of Poland: Aleksander Kwaśniewski, Lech Kaczyński, and more recently (in 2011) - Bronisław Komorowski. So far, all the requests, due to the negative criminological prognosis (progressive progression of sexual dysfunction) have been treated negatively at the judicial stage, and thus left without further progress.

Mariusz Sowiński will be able to apply for conditional early release in early 2047, at the age of 71.

== See also ==
- List of serial killers by country
