= Walternienburg-Bernburg culture =

Bernburg Culture
- Geographical range: Harzvorland up to the Thuringian Basin
- Period: Late Neolithic
- Dates: 3100 BC - 2700 BC.
- Characteristics: decorated/undecorated bulbous cups with broad handles, amphorae, storage containers with perforated rims, wave-edged vessels, clay drums
- Preceded by: Funnelbeaker culture
- Followed by: Corded Ware culture, Bell Beaker culture

Walternienburg-Bernburger Kultur refers to a mid-Neolithic culture which was focused on the area of modern Saxony-Anhalt, the Thuringian Basin and Franconia from 3200 to 2800 BC. It consisted of two regional groups, Walternienburg and Bernburg which interacted closely with each other. Both are named after burial sites in Saxony-Anhalt. Alfred Götze identified the Bernburg type in 1892 and the Walternienburg in 1911. Nils Åberg linked them together as the Walternienburg-Bernburg Culture in 1918, as two closely connected or completely co-extensive cultures. This suggestion is no longer valid, however, since the two cultures have clearly distinct funerary and burial practices. The earlier large stone graves attributed to the Walternienburg culture are today assigned to the Tiefstichkeramik culture and the shape of pottery belonging to the Walternienburg culture shows that it was in the Tiefstichkeramik tradition.

== History ==
The Bernburg Culture emerged about 3200 BC as a late southern offshoot of the Funnelbeaker culture.

== Material artifacts ==
The Walternienburg group is recognisable by the appearance of sharply articulated handle-cups and hanging vessels with eyelets. The vessels of the Bernburg group on the other hand are rather bulbous, concave, and curved in an 's' shape. The pottery of both groups is decorated with deep incisions, which were partially filled with a white paste and thereby made to stand out. The dominant ceramic forms are decorated and undecorated bulbous handled cups, belly amphorae, funnel beakers and bowls. Clay drums also appear. Especially typical is the presence of double-axes, and slate blades, as well as triangular and trapezoidal flint arrowheads. The group lacks two major types of artefacts which are typical of the funnelbeaker culture: funnelbeakers and collar bottles.

== Burials ==
The graves take on many forms. Common forms include flat graves, stone cists and stone chamber tombs. Communal burials in Totenhütte are found at Schönstedt and Benzingerode. Rampenkiste and Mauerkammern are also widespread. The skeletal material shows evidence of trepanation.

=== Relative Quantity ===
The 178 excavated graves (Stand 1982) can be divided as follows:

- 86 (48,3 %): Bernburg Culture
- 40 (22,5 %): Walternienburg Culture
- 12 (6,75 %): Walternienburg and Bernburg Culture
- 34 (19%): Walternienburg-Bernburg Culture
- 5 (2,75 %): Globular Amphora culture (which is associated with the Bernburg forms)
- 1 (0,5 %): corded ware culture.

The separation of the Walternienburg-Bernburg culture into two separate cultures in Hesse and along the Havel is apparent in the funerary and burial remains. The graves of the Bernburg culture are in Thuringia and North Harzvorland, while the Walternienburg culture is concentrated in the Havel watershed. In the area around Quedlinburg, in eastern Harzvorland and around Köthen however, a clear mixing of the forms of both cultures can be observed in the inventories of graves.

== Settlements ==
Village settlements and fortified citadel settlements are widespread. Known citadels with multiple graves are found on the Lang Berg in Dölauer Heide near Halle, the Schalkenburg near Quenstadt and the Steinkuhlenberg near Derenburg.

== Economy ==
The basis of the economy was agriculture and cattle farming. Emmer, Einkorn, barley and flax were known and grown. They are known to have domesticated cattle, sheep, goats, pigs, dogs and horses.

== Genetics ==
Brandt et al. 2013 found that the emergence of the Bernburg Culture was accompanied by a significant genetic shift. People of the Bernburg Culture were found to be closely related to people of the Scandinavian Funnelbeaker culture, having a much higher proportion of maternal lineages associated with hunter-gatherers. While previous cultures of the area displayed genetic affinites to the Middle East, the Bernburg culture is shifted towards Northern Europe.

Haak et al. 2015 examined the remains of a Salzmünde/Bernburg male buried in Esperstedt, c. 3360-3086 BC. He was found to be a carrier of the paternal haplogroup I2a1b1a1 and the maternal haplogroup T2b.

Beau et al. 2017 noted that the emergence of the Bernburg culture was associated by a significant increase in hunter-gatherer lineages as compared to previous cultures of Central Europe. The amount of hunter-gatherer maternal lineages among the Bernburg people was estimated at c. 30%. Similar high levels of hunter-gatherer lineages is observable among Funnelbeaker groups further north. The authors of the study suggested that the Bernburg culture emerged through the migration of peoples from Scandinavia.

Stolarek et al. 2018 examined remains from the 1st to 2nd century AD site of Kowalenko, Poland, which was part of the Iron Age Wielbark culture. The mtDNA of the females examined was found to be most closely related to the Bernburg culture, while the mtDNA of the males was found to be most closely related to the Jutland Iron Age. A later study by Stolarek et al. 2019 examined the 2nd to 4th century AD site at Masłomęcz, Poland, also ascribed to the Wielbark culture. The mtDNA of the examined individuals was very similar to that of the Bernburg culture. It was found that several major cultures of Late Neolithic, Bronze Age and Iron Age cultures, such as the Corded Ware culture, Bell Beaker culture and Unetice culture, shared strong maternal genetic affinity with the Bernburg culture.

== Bibliography ==
- Birgitt Berthold: Die Totenhütte von Benzingerode, Halle 2008, ISBN 978-3-939414-12-4
- Hans-Jürgen Beier: "Die Grab- und Bestattungssitten der Walternienburger und der Bernburger Kultur." Wissenschaftliche Beiträge 1984/30 (L19) of the Martin-Luther University of Halle-Wittenberg ISSN 0440-1298
- Beau, Alice; et al. (July 5, 2017). "Multi-scale ancient DNA analyses confirm the western origin of Michelsberg farmers and document probable practices of human sacrifice". PLOS One. 12 (7) e0179742. PLOS. Bibcode:2017PLoSO..1279742B. doi:10.1371/journal.pone.0179742. PMC 5497962. PMID 28678860.
- Brandt, Guido; et al. (December 10, 2013). "Ancient DNA Reveals Key Stages in the Formation of Central European Mitochondrial Genetic Diversity". Science. 342 (6155). American Association for the Advancement of Science: 257–261. Bibcode:2013Sci...342..257B. doi:10.1126/science.1241844. PMC 4039305. PMID 24115443.
- Haak, Wolfgang; et al. (March 2, 2015). "Massive migration from the steppe was a source for Indo-European languages in Europe". Nature. 522 (7555). Nature Research: 207–211. arXiv:1502.02783. Bibcode:2015Natur.522..207H. doi:10.1038/nature14317. PMC 5048219. PMID 25731166.
- Mathieson, Iain; et al. (February 21, 2018). "The genomic history of southeastern Europe". Nature. 555 (7695). Nature Research: 197–203. Bibcode:2018Natur.555..197M. doi:10.1038/nature25778. PMC 6091220. PMID 29466330.
- Stolarek, Ireneuz; et al. (February 6, 2018). "A mosaic genetic structure of the human population living in the South Baltic region during the Iron Age". Nature Communications. 8 (2455). Nature Research: 2455. Bibcode:2018NatSR...8.2455S. doi:10.1038/s41598-018-20705-6. PMC 5802798. PMID 29410482.
- Stolarek, I.; et al. (May 1, 2019). "Goth migration induced changes in the matrilineal genetic structure of the central-east European population". Nature Communications. 9 (6737). Nature Research: 6737. Bibcode:2019NatSR...9.6737S. doi:10.1038/s41598-019-43183-w. PMC 6494872. PMID 31043639.
- Heinz Knöll "Kragenflaschen Ihre Verbreitung und Ihre Zeitstellung" Europäischen Neolithikum Offa, Vol. 41.
- Ernst Probst: Deutschland in der Steinzeit, pp. 380–385, München 1991, ISBN 3-572-01058-6
- Karin Schwertfeger: "Walternienburger Kultur," pp. 195–202. In: H.-J. Beier und R. Einicke (Edd.): Das Neolithikum im Mittelelbe-Saale-Gebiet. Eine Übersicht und ein Abriß zum Stand der Forschung. Verlag Beier & Beran. Wilkau-Hasslau. 1994. ISBN 3-930036-05-3
- Marcel Torres-Blanco: "Bernburger Kultur," pp. 159–177. In: H.-J. Beier und R. Einicke (Edd.): Das Neolithikum im Mittelelbe-Saale-Gebiet. Eine Übersicht und ein Abriß zum Stand der Forschung. Verlag Beier & Beran. Wilkau-Hasslau. 1994. ISBN 3-930036-05-3
