= Michael Karkoc =

Ukrainian Nazi collaborator

- Михайло Каркоць
- Born: Mykhailo Karkots; March 6, 1919; Luzk, Ukrainian People's Republic
- Died: December 14, 2019 (aged 100); Minneapolis, Minnesota
- Occupation: Military officer

Michael Karkoc (Note: Ukrainian: Михайло Каркоць, romanized: Mykhailo Karkots) (March 6, 1919 – December 14, 2019) was a military officer who served in the Ukrainian Self Defense Legion (USDL) and later in the Waffen-SS during World War II. In June 2013, a man with the same name who lived in Minnesota was alleged by Associated Press to be the same person. His son rejected his father's identification as a "Nazi".

== World War II ==
According to the Associated Press, Karkoc was a founding member and a lieutenant in the 2nd Company of the Ukrainian Self Defense Legion. The USDL was one of the battalions of the Schutzmannschaft organized and sponsored by the Nazi German Schutzstaffel, led by the Nazi German SS-Police, and the Nazi German Sicherheitsdienst (SD) SS Intelligence Agency. Following the disbandment of the USDL, he was transferred to the 14th Waffen Grenadier Division of the SS (1st Ukrainian) "Galizien" ("14th Waffen-SS Division"), where he was an officer and served as a deputy company commander.

The USDL allegedly took part in war crimes against civilians in Ukraine and Poland. His personal participation in any war crimes has not been demonstrated, but according to the AP, Nazi German records suggest that as the lieutenant and company leader he, along with his USDL unit, participated in suppressing the August 1944 Warsaw Uprising, as well as multiple other actions against civilians including the massacres at the villages of Chłaniów and Władysławin on July 23, 1944. Some news reports, referencing the AP investigation, state that Karkoc served in the 14th Waffen-SS Division and that it helped to suppress the Warsaw Uprising; however the Division did not participate in the fighting of the Warsaw Uprising, nor was it even in Poland at the time.

The USDL was disbanded in November 1944 and the few surviving units were mostly assigned to the 30th Grenadier Division of the Waffen-SS. In the first months of 1945, some of the remaining elements of the USDL, formally known as the 31 SD Schutzmannschafts Battalion, were transferred to the 14th Waffen-SS Division, which was engaged in anti-partisan actions on the Slovenian-Austrian border. Thus if Karkoc had been a member of the 14th Waffen-SS Division, it would have been for a few months before it surrendered to Western Allies by May 10, 1945. According to the AP, a Nazi German payroll sheet found in Polish archives signed by an SS officer on January 8, 1945 suggests that Karkoc was present in Kraków, Poland to collect his salary as a member of the USDL.

== Allegations about identity ==
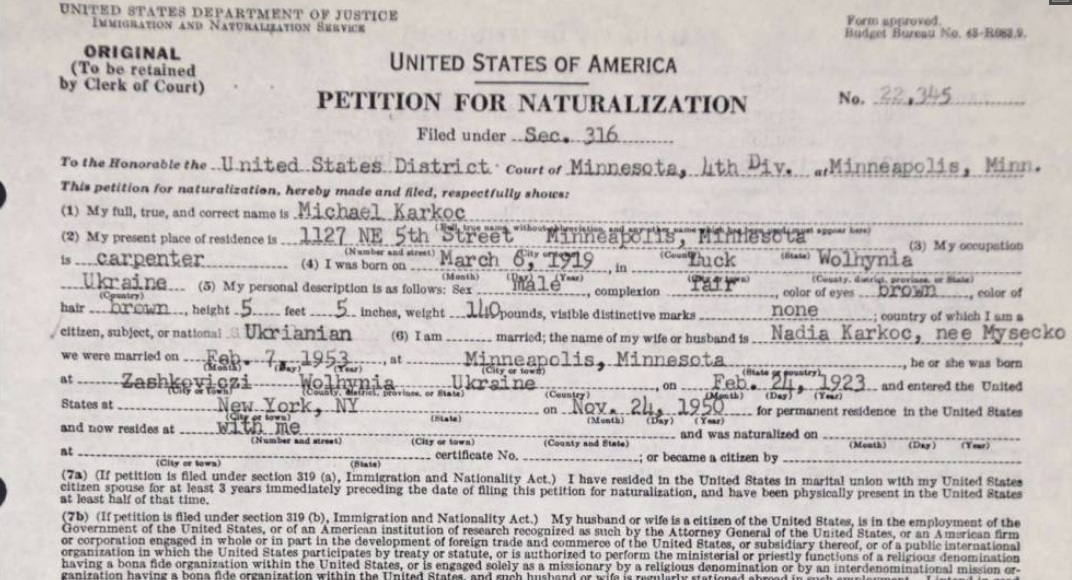
Karkoc's petition for naturalization

A man named Michael Karkoc immigrated to the U.S. in 1949 after claiming to the immigration authorities that he had performed no military service during the war. At that time, he said that he worked for his father until 1944 and then worked in a labor camp from 1944 until 1945. Ten years after immigrating he became a naturalized U.S. citizen.

In June 2013, the Associated Press published a lengthy investigative report after earlier having been briefed in detail by Nazi war crimes and Holocaust researcher Dr. Stephen Ankier, who had initially documented Michael Karkoc's wartime record and located his whereabouts as well as uncovering his wartime memoir that crucially revealed his 'nom de guerre', which alleged that the man named Michael Karkoc currently living in Minneapolis, Minnesota is the same Michael Karkoc who was a "SS commander", born in 1919, and that he had acknowledged his roles with the USDL and the 14th Waffen-SS Division in a 1995 Ukrainian language memoir. (Note: Immigration papers for a Michael Karkoc show he was born in the Lutsk, while Nazi German papers show a Michael Karkoc born in Horodok. There are several places by that name; one of them is in Lutsk Raion.) (Note: The same membership records show that two of the men under Karkoc's command were Teodozy Dak, who was convicted of war crimes in Poland in 1972, and Vasyl Malazhenski, who allegedly admitted to committing war crimes to Soviet authorities in 1967.)

Andriy Karkos, the son of the Minnesota Michael Karkoc who spells his last name differently from his father, stated that his father was never a Nazi and accused the Associated Press of defaming his father. Karkos described his father as a "lifelong Republican", who donated $3,850 to the Republican National Committee in 2013 and 2014. A German investigation was initiated shortly after the Associated Press story broke. In July 2015, the investigation was shelved due to Karkoc being deemed not fit to stand trial. In March 2017, the Polish government announced it would be seeking the extradition of an individual known as Michael K. from the United States in connection with crimes committed during World War II. Prosecutor Robert Janicki, Head of the Main Commission for the Prosecution of Crimes Against the Polish Nation, acknowledged that specialised analysis of the photographs included in the investigation played ”an important and vital role” in confirming the identity of Michael K. The Associated Press subsequently reported that they had identified this individual to be the same person as Karkoc. In 2018, U.S. medical experts examined whether Karkoc was fit to stand trial, following the Polish extradition request.

== Death ==
Karkoc died in Minneapolis on December 14, 2019, at the age of 100. He was buried at Hillside Cemetery next to his wife, Nadia, who died in 2018.
