= Baalberge group =

Archaeological culture

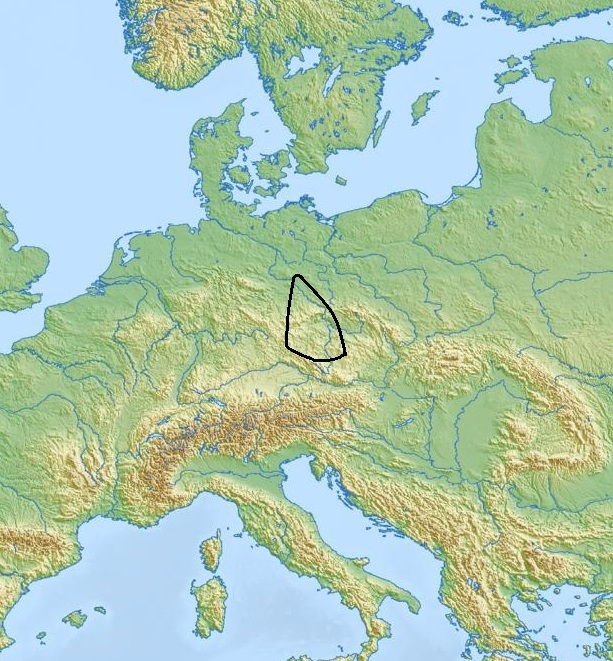
Map of the distribution of the Baalberge group

The Baalberge Group (German: Baalberger Kultur, also Baalberge-Kultur) was a late neolithic "culture" in Central Germany and Bohemia between 4000 and 3150 BC. Because of issues with the archaeological use of the term culture it is now often referred to as the Baalberge Ceramic style (Baalberger Keramikstil). It is named after its first findspot: on the Schneiderberg at Baalberge, Salzlandkreis, Saxony-Anhalt. The Baalberge group is generally seen as part of the Funnelbeaker culture. In the Middle Elbe/Saale region it is part of Funnelbeaker phase TRB-MES II and III.

== History and scholarship ==
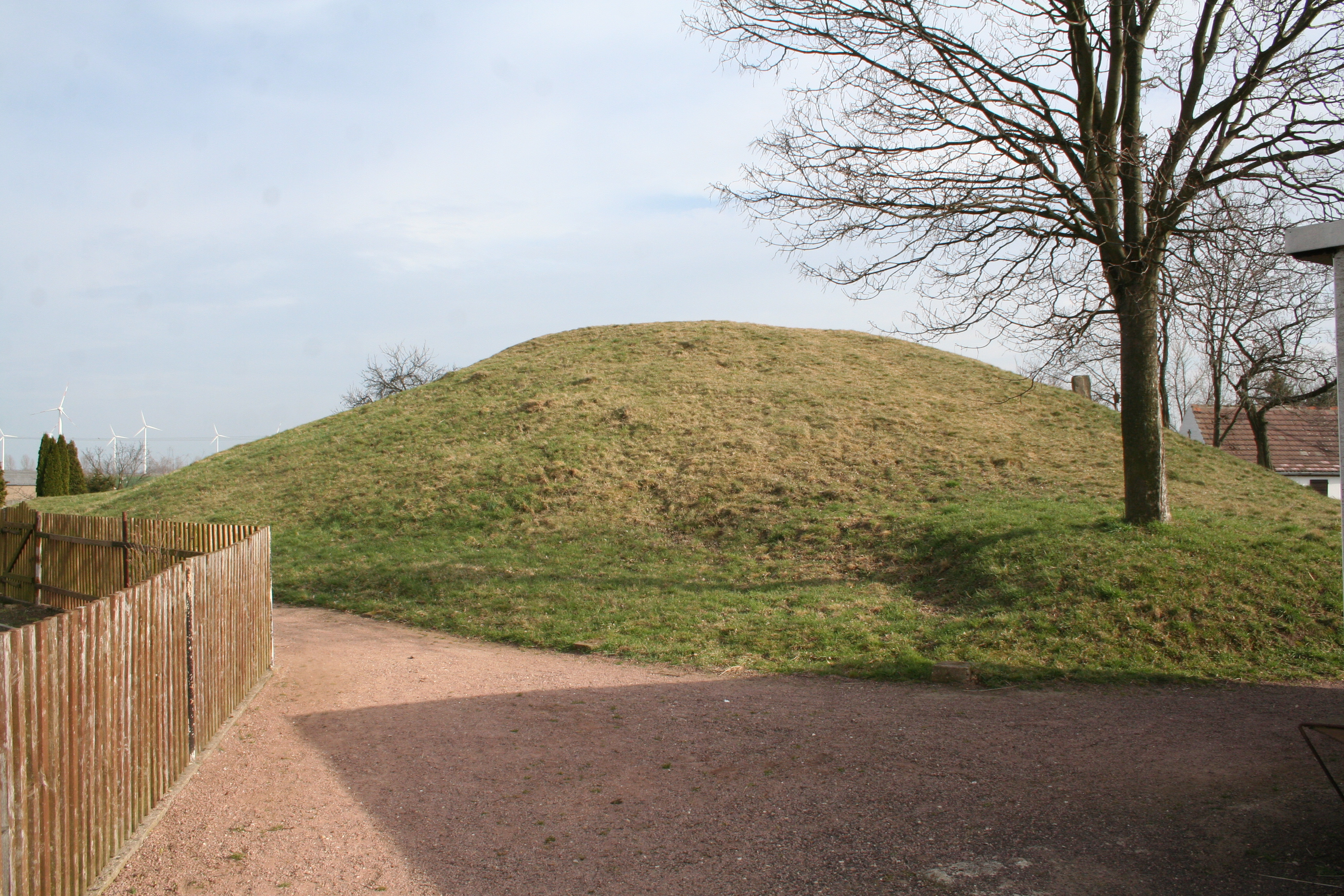
The Schneiderberg in Baalberge is the namesake of the Baalberge Kultur.

An early example of the Funnelbeaker culture, the Baalberge ceramic style dates between 3800 - 3400 BC and belongs to the central German funnelbeaker phases TRB-MES II (3800-3500 BC) and TRB-MES III (3500-3350 BC). It developed out of phase TRB-MES I (4100-3800 BC), innovating under the influence of western influences (Michelsberg culture and the southeastern, late Lengyel culture).

A more complex society developed after 3350 BC in the TRB-MES IV phase, with distinct decorative styles (Salzmünd group and Walternienburg-Bernburg Culture).

The Baalberge culture was first identified as a distinct group on the grounds of pottery types by Nils Niklasson and Paul Kupka. Before this it had been included in the Bernburg type. Kupka grouped the finds belonging to the Baalberge culture together under the name "Central German Stilthouse Pottery" (mitteldeutsche Pfahlbaukeramik). Paul Grimm followed this with the first division of the material into Early, High, Late and Pre-Unetice periods in 1937. Paul Kupka and C.J. Becker put the Baalberg group in parallel with the northern Funnelbeaker culture. Joachim Preuß divided the Baalberg culture into an older and later phase using burial practices and pottery typologies. Scientific data indicates however that the divisions do not indicate chronological differences. According to Johannes Müller they instead show different social groups.

Marija Gimbutas and her followers argue that the Baalberg culture was an intrusive hybrid culture deriving ultimately from the Eurasian steppe, part of the Kurgan hypothesis. In that case it would have been an Indo-European-speaking culture. Some aspects of Baalberge burials might support this theory, such as the presence of pottery allegedly influenced by the Baden culture (an Indo-Europeanised culture according to Gimbutas) and the Bodrogkeresztúr culture and the posture of the corpses, laid on their right hand side with their legs pulled up - a posture typical of the "Yamna culture." But other aspects of the burials are very different from burials in the east, such as the placement of the hands over the mouth in an eating gesture (which is unknown in authentic kurgan sites) and the much less marked use of red ochre. In particular, there are no signs of the steppe kurgans that characterise the Kurgan culture. Finally, comparative anatomy suggests the deceased came from a locally derived population, not from the east. Mallory therefore considers the Baalberge group a local development.

== Distribution ==
The main distribution area is the central Elbe-Saale region. Further finds occur in Mecklenburg-Vorpommern and Brandenburg. A distinctive variant is also known from Bohemia, of which numerous individual finds extend as far as Lower Austria. The distribution area extends further to the north than that of the Rössen culture. The whole settlement area is self-contained.

== Settlements ==
Settlements are only barely known. Usually they contain waste pits with characteristic material (clay, stone, bone material), hearths, and the postholes of a few individual houses in rather extended settlements (Braunsdorf, Merseburg).

Houses are rectangular or square and of medium size. Pit-houses are rectangular or oval. Other pits were used for storage, waste disposal and sacrifices. A large settlement in Pirkau, Hohenmölsen was found in emergency excavations but provides no evidence of houses. There were also finds at the settlement built at Dölauer Heide in Halle which is surrounded by an embankment.

== Material culture ==
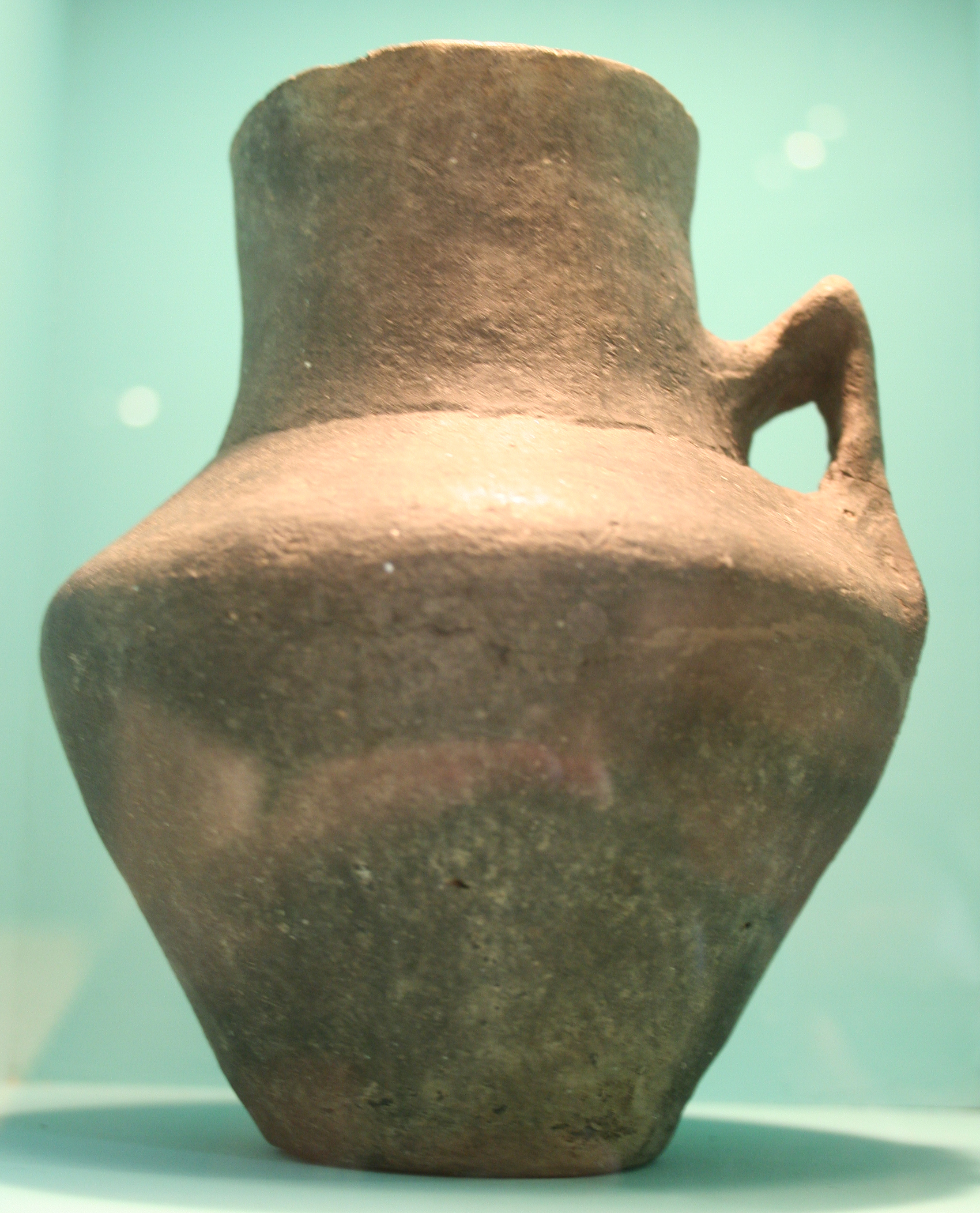
Jug of the Baalberge group from Winningen, Saxony-Anhalt; Museum für Vor- und Frühgeschichte, Berlin

The Baalberge group is largely made up of undecorated wares with clearly defined neck, shoulder and lower parts. They have a very round profile, varying between egg-shaped, biconical, and bulbous, with clearly differentiated bases. Incised and stamped patterns occur around the neck and shoulder. The pottery types, generally used as funerary items, were very well represented at Dölauer Heide in Halle. A grey-brown leatherlike finish is typical of the Baalberge culture. When broken, the sherds reveal a dark grey to black fabric. The complete ceramic inventory forms a self-contained type region in the usage area of the Baalberg culture. The main forms are:

- Amphorae: with two, four and multiple handles
- Pitchers: Baalberg is the first culture which has pitchers. The necks are usually trefoil shaped.
- Cups: usually with small footprints.
- Funnelbeakers: tall and slim with small footprints
- Bowls: angle-lipped bowls, wide funnel lip bowls with distinct feet and carinated bowls
- Pottery tools: ladles and spoons

Stone tools:

- Short, squat, round-necked axes from Chörau in Köthen and Warle in Wolfenbüttel,
- Flat stone hatchets with rounded rectangular cross-sections,
- Flint tools like crosscutters, three-point arrow heads (Quenstedt, Hettstedt), knives and knife-sharpeners.

The metal finds associated with the Baalberge culture are among the oldest in the central German Neolithic.

== Economy ==
The economy was unspecialised agriculture and pastoralism. Crops included emmer, einkorn, dwarf wheat, and barley. Animals included cattle, pigs, sheep and goats.

== Graves and funerary sites ==
The graves are mostly individual. A large graveyard was found at Zauschwitz, Borna. Double graves and pit graves are also known (e.g. Schalkenburg, Quenstedt). Unusual forms include settlement burials and partial burials.

In addition to simple earth graves, innovative forms with architectural elements also appear. The first tumulus graves in central Germany also come from this culture. Baalberge is the first culture in which megalithic influences in the form of grave complexes, tumulus enclosures, and cists can be detected. At the same time, heavy cists sunk in the ground or raised above it and slab graves are rare. Other grave elements can be detected, such as stone packing, wooden fittings and the combination of stone and wooden components.

Tumulus graves contain earth and stone cist graves as primary burials. In the gravemound at Latdorf in Bernburg, a narrow stone cist was found which was surrounded by a 25 metre long trapezoidal barrow. The earthen graves of the Baalberge culture usually contain inhumations, with the bodies nearly always laid out on a west-east orientation flexed on their right side. Some inhumations were enclosed in square or trapezoidal ditches. In 1966, J. Preuß recorded 116 grave-complexes in the central German habitation area. The grave-complex at Stemmem excavated by W. Matthias in 1952 is 16.4 m long and squared at both ends and was the first enclosure grave recognised as a Baalberge burial.

In 1983, G. Möbes published a number of new finds from Thuringia. In Großbrembach in Sömmerda a nearly square complex with rounded corners measuring 10.8 x 10.4 metres contains two crouching inhumations lying on their right sides and oriented south-north. The grave ditch was described as partially flat, partially trough shaped. Bright bands in the soil filling seem to indicate the inflow of water. Unetice stone packed graves around it indicate that the flat barrow must have remained well known. A similar complex was investigated in 1974 at Sommerberg near Großfahner in the proximity of Erfurt. It was a 19/17 x 15.5/14.5 metre trapezoid containing a 2.3 metre wide grave. The west side was overlapped by a small burial hut of the Corded Ware culture with several skeletons. This Corded Ware grave in the centre also shows that the main tomb must have remained well known even 1000 years after its construction. This reuse by later cultures, including the Globular Amphora culture and the Unetice culture, is common. Pottery was found as grave goods, including combinations of pitchers and cups.

== Religion and Cult ==
A belief in an afterlife (perhaps in the grave) is suggested by the grave goods.

Cultic finds include charred remains of human and animal skeletons in a pit at Melchendorf in Erfurt. At Wansleben in Eilsleben an upright human skull between two sandstone plates and below a plate covered in cattle horns attests to the practice of skull deposition.

== Genetics ==
Mathieson et al. (2015) found two males carrying the paternal haplogroups I2 and R1b1b=R-PF6323, V88. Beside this, other teams only found many mtDNA examples between 3900 and 3150 BC.

== Bibliography ==
General Overview

- Hermann Behrens. Die Jungsteinzeit im Mittelelbe-Saale-Gebiet (= Veröffentlichungen des Landesmuseums für Vorgeschichte Halle. Vol 27). Berlin 1973. (outdated)
- Paul Grimm. "Die Baalberger Kultur in Mitteldeutschland." Mannus, Vol. 19, 1937, pp. 155–187.
- Thomas Kubenz. "Baalberger Kultur." in Hans-Jürgen Beier and Ralph Einicke (edd.). Das Neolithikum im Mittelelbe-Saale-Gebiet. Eine Übersicht und ein Abriß zum Stand der Forschung. Verlag Beier & Beran. Wilkau-Hasslau. 1994. ISBN 3-930036-05-3, pp. 113-128.
- Cultural Association of the GDR (Ed.). Typentafeln zur Ur- und Frühgeschichte [Edited by R. Feustel/S. Barthel], Weimar 1972.
- J. P. Mallory, "Baalberge group", Encyclopedia of Indo-European Culture, Fitzroy Dearborn, 1997.
- Gerhard Mildenberger. Studien zum mitteldeutschen Neolithikum. Leipzig 1953.
- Joachim Preuß. Das Neolithikum in Mitteleuropa. Kulturen - Wirtschaft - Umwelt vom 6. bis 3. Jahrtausend v. u. Z. (Weißenbach, Beier und Beran 1996).
- Joachim Preuß. "Die chronologische Stellung der Baalberger, Salzmünder und Walternienburger Gruppe innerhalb der Trichterbecherkultur Mitteldeutschlands." in Academy of Sciences of the Czech Republic (Ed.). L'Europe à la fin de l'âge de la pierre: Actes du Symposium consacré aux problèmes du Néolithique européen, Prague, Liblice, Brno 5.-12.10.1959. Prag 1961, pp. 405–413.
- Joachim Preuß. Die Baalberger Gruppe in Mitteldeutschland. Berlin 1966.

Chronology

- Jan Lichardus. Rössen - Gatersleben - Baalberge. Ein Beitrag zur Gliederung des mitteldeutschen Neolithikums und zur Entstehung der Trichterbecher-Kulturen (Saarbrücker Beiträge zur Altertumskunde Vol. 17). Bonn 1976; reviewed by Ulrich Fischer in Germania Vol. 56, 1978, pp. 574-581.
- Johannes Müller. Radiocarbonchronologie – Keramiktechnologie – Osteologie - Anthropologie-Raumanalyse. Beiträge zum Neolithikum und zur Frühbronzezeit im Mittelelbe-Saale-Gebiet. 80. Ber. RGK 1999, pp.25-211.
- Johannes Müller. Soziochronologische Studien zum Jung- und Spätneolithikum im Mittelelbe-Saale-Gebiet (4100-2700 v. Chr.) (Vorgeschichtliche Forschungen Vol. 21). Rahden, Leidorf 2001.

Material culture

- Heinz Knöll. "Die Trichterbecher und ihre Beziehungen zu einigen neolithischen Kulturen Mitteldeutschlands." Jahresschrift für mitteldeutsche Vorgeschichte, Vol. 38, 1954, pp. 40–48.
- Paul Kupka. "Alter, Wesen und Verbreitung der mitteldeutschen Steinzeittonware. Nachträgliches und Ergänzendes." Beiträge zur Geschichte, Landes und Volkskunde der Altmark, Vol. 5 (1925–1930), 1928, pp. 201–262.
- Paul Kupka. "Die Wurzeln der mitteldeutschen Steinzeittonware." Beiträge zur Geschichte, Landes und Volkskunde der Altmark, Vol. 4 (1915–1925), 1922, pp. 364–384.
- Paul Kupka. "Neue aufschlußreiche Schönfelder Gräber von Kleimöringen im Kreis Stendal." Beiträge zur Geschichte, Landes und Volkskunde der Altmark, Vol. 7 (1938–1941), 1940, pp. 139–167.
- Detlef W. Müller. "Frühes Kupfer und Baalberge. Betrachtungen zu einem Grabfund aus Unseburg, Kr. Staßfurt." Ausgrabungen und Funde, Vol. 35, 1990, pp. 166–171.
- Nils Niklasson. "Neue Ausgrabungen in Rössen." Mannus, Vol. 11/12, 1920/21, pp. 309–337.
- Nils Niklasson. Studien über die Walternienburg-Bernburger Kultur 1 (= Jahresschrift für mitteldeutsche Vorgeschichte, Band 13). Halle (Saale) 1925.

Building works

- Kirstin Funke. Die Trapezgrabenanlagen der Baalberger Kultur von Großlehna-Altranstädt und Zwenkau, Lkr. Leipziger Land. 2 Vols., Halle (Saale) 2000.
- Oliver Rück. "Die baalbergezeitliche Kreisgrabenanlage Belleben I (Salzlandkreis, Sachsen-Anhalt). Die Ausgrabungen 2009 bis 2011 – Vorbericht und erste Ergebnisse." In Martin Hinz, Johannes Müller (Edd.). Siedlung Grabenwerk Großsteingrab. Frühe Monumentalität und Soziale Differenzierung. Vol. 2, Rudolf Habelt Verlag, Bonn 2012, ISBN 978-3-7749-3813-7, pp. 389–410.

Grave complexes and burial customs

- Ulrich Fischer. Die Gräber der Steinzeit im Saale-Gebiet. Studien über neolithische und frühbronzezeitliche Grab- und Bestattungsformen in Sachsen-Thüringen (= Vorgeschichtliche Forschungen, Band 15). Berlin 1956.
- Paul Höfer. "Baalberge." Jahresschrift für mitteldeutsche Vorgeschichte, Vol. 1, 1902, pp. 16–49.
- Dieter Kaufmann & Arno Brömme. "Ein Gräberkomplex der Baalberger Gruppe in der Dölauer Heide bei Halle (Saale)." Jahresschrift für mitteldeutsche Vorgeschichte, Vol. 56, 1972, pp. 39–57.
- Joachim Preuß. "Ein Grabhügel der Baalberger Gruppe von Preußlitz, Kr. Bernburg." Jahresschrift für mitteldeutsche Vorgeschichte, Vol. 41/42, 1958, pp. 197–202.
- Erhard Schröter. "Baalberger Gräber auf der Schalkenburg bei Quenstedt, Kr. Hettstedt." Ausgrabungen und Funde, Vol. 21, 1976, pp. 229–233.
- Thomas Weber. "Die Häuser der Toten" Archäologie in Sachsen-Anhalt Vol. 3. 1993.

Anthropology

- Kirstin Funke. Die Bevölkerung der Baalberger Kultur. Eine Anthropologisch-Archäologische Analyse. Halle (Saale) 2007 (PDF; 49,0 MB).

== Sources ==
- Mathieson, Iain (November 23, 2015). "Genome-wide patterns of selection in 230 ancient Eurasians". Nature. 528 (7583). Nature Research: 499–503. Bibcode:2015Natur.528..499M. doi:10.1038/nature16152. PMC 4918750. PMID 26595274.
- Mathieson, Iain (February 21, 2018). "The Genomic History of Southeastern Europe". Nature. 555 (7695). Nature Research: 197–203. Bibcode:2018Natur.555..197M. doi:10.1038/nature25778. PMC 6091220. PMID 29466330.
