= Ukrainian Legion of Self-Defense =

Ukrainian collaborationist faction

- Український легіон самооборони
- Leaders: Mikhail Soltis; Petro Dyachenko
- Founded: 1943
- Dissolved: 1945
- Country: Nazi Germany
- Allegiance: SD; Waffen-SS; UNA (April-May 1945)
- Headquarters: Western Ukraine; Poland; Chełm Land; Yugoslavia
- Ideology: Ukrainian nationalism Anticommunism; Antisemitism; Anti-Polish sentiment
- Size: 500-1,000
- Part of: OUN (Melnykites)

The Ukrainian Legion of Self-Defense (German: Ukrainische Selbstschutz Legion; Ukrainian: Український легіон самооборони, Ukrains’kyi Legion Samooborony) was a Ukrainian collaborationist formation during World War II known for its war crimes.

== Formation in Volhynia ==
The OUN-M began forming partisan units in Volhynia in parallel with the Bandera faction at the turn of 1942 and 1943. Despite hostility between the two factions, their partisans often cooperated in operations against Soviet partisans and German forces. Although the OUN-M condemned the genocidal actions of the Bandera forces, Melnyk-aligned partisan units occasionally took part in attacks on Polish villages. When the OUN-M leadership ordered in July 1943 its units to withdraw from any agreements with the Banderites, UPA units responded by surrounding the Melnyk units, disarming them, and forcibly incorporating them. As a result, the OUN-M was effectively deprived of its military forces in Volhynia.

In this situation, a rapprochement occurred between the Melnyk faction, represented by Mykhailo Soltys "Cherkies", and the local SD of the Volhynia–Podolia district of the Reichskommissariat Ukraine.

The Ukrainian Legion of Self-Defense was formed as a result of an agreement between the SD and the Lutsk leadership of the OUN-M. As a result, a partisan unit was formed which, in December, was stationed in Pidhaitsi, where it received equipment, training, and liaison officers from the Germans. One of them, SS Captain Siegfried Assmuss, became the unit’s German commander at the beginning of January 1944.

After him, the Legion was referred to by the Germans as Kampfgruppe Assmuss or Sondereinheit Assmuss. It was also known as the 31st Schutzmannschaft Battalion of the Security Police (31. Schutzmannschaft der Sicherheitspolizei Bataillon) and as the Melnyk Combat Group (Melnikkampfgruppe). Initially, Ukrainians referred to it as the Raiding Unit (Ukrainian: Рейдуючий відділ), and later as the Volhynian Legion. By mid-1944, the name Ukrainian Legion of Self-Defense became established.

== Activity in the Lublin region ==
In February, the Legion took part in heavy fighting in western Volhynia against Soviet partisans and the Polish 27th Volhynian Infantry Division of the Home Army. During these clashes, it suffered heavy losses and carried out a pacification of the Polish village of Karczunek, where between 30 and 60 Poles were killed. At that point, the Germans replaced the Ukrainian commander. In place of "Cherkies," the position was taken by Colonel Oleksandr Kvitko, and they began intensive training in the area of Dziekanów and Moroczyn in the Lublin region. At the same time, the Legion continued fighting, mainly against Polish partisan forces. During these operations, the ULS committed crimes against the Polish population. On 8 March 1944, in the colony of Prehoryłe, it killed 38 people. On 26 March, on the road from Liski Horodelskie, a ULS patrol murdered five Poles. On 27 March, German forces, including the ULS, defeated the unit of Stanisław Basaj "Ryś" in Smoligów, after which they began the pacification of the village and the two colonies of Ameryka and Olszynka. In Smoligów alone, 200–220 people were killed.

In April and May, the ULS spent most of its time in Volhynia, where it took part in fighting against the UPA.

In the spring of 1944, the ULS, then numbering between 300 and 600 men, together with other Ukrainian collaborationist units, was transferred again from Volhynia to eastern Lublin region to fight the Polish and Soviet underground. The ULS was stationed in the villages of Moroczyn and Tudorkowice, where it conducted recruitment, under new command of Colonel Volodymyr Herasymenko "Tur".

On 22 July 1944, the unit's German commander, Assmuss, was killed in a Soviet ambush near Chłaniów. In retaliation, ULS soldiers attacked Chłaniów and the nearby Władysławin, murdering 44 inhabitants, among them 5 children, and burning 41 farms. The death toll was relatively low because most of the residents had already evacuated.

== Miechów and Warsaw ==
The unit’s new German commander became SS Major Ewald Biegelmayer. The unit moved to Bukowska Wola, near Miechów. There, it grew to a strength of 600–900 men, reinforced mainly by officers from the SS Division Galicia and personnel from the 207th Schutzmannschaft Battalion. Near Miechów, the unit fought against Polish partisan forces, mainly those of the so-called Pińczów Republic. During this period, on 5 August 1944, its members committed a crime by murdering 11 inhabitants of Szarbia.

Fighting in a region so distant from Ukraine caused discontent within the ranks of the ULS. This was further intensified by the order to send the Legion to Warsaw to suppress the Polish uprising. The Germans managed to calm the situation and sent a ULS detachment of over 200 men to Warsaw under the command of Colonel Petro Diachenko. It arrived there in the first days of September, where it took part in fighting against the insurgents. Then, around 24 September, it was transferred to the Kampinos Forest, where it fought against Home Army units. In October, it returned to the Miechów area.

== Dissolution ==
In January 1945, the ULS marched through Cieszyn to Ostrava. From there, it was transferred to Austria and then to Slovenia, where it fought against Tito’s partisans. In March, ULS soldiers were forcibly incorporated into the 14th Waffen Grenadier Division of the SS.

== Bibliography ==
- Majewski, Marcin (2005). "Przyczynek do wojennych dziejów Ukraińskiego Legionu Samoobrony (1943–1945)" [A Contribution to the Wartime History of the Ukrainian Self-Defense Legion (1943–1945)]. Pamięć i Sprawiedliwość (in Polish). 8 (2): 295–327.
- Zajączkowski, Mariusz (2015). Ukraińskie podziemie na Lubelszczyźnie w okresie okupacji niemieckiej 1939-1944 [Ukrainian underground in the Lublin region during the German occupation 1939-1944] (in Polish).
