= Białoskóry =

Białoskóry refers to the following places in Poland:

- Białoskóry, Lublin Voivodeship
- Białoskóry, Masovian Voivodeship
