= Moniatycze-Kolonia =

- Village
- Location within Poland
- Coordinates: 50°53′N 23°52′E
- Country: Poland
- Voivodeship: Lublin
- County: Hrubieszów
- Gmina: Hrubieszów
- Elevation: 230 m (750 ft)
- Population: 171

Moniatycze-Kolonia [mɔɲaˈtɨt͡ʂɛ kɔˈlɔɲa] is a village in the administrative district of Gmina Hrubieszów, within Hrubieszów County, Lublin Voivodeship, in eastern Poland, close to the border with Ukraine.
