= Kozodawy =

- Village
- Location within Poland
- Coordinates: 50°45′34″N 23°55′56″E
- Country: Poland
- Voivodeship: Lublin
- County: Hrubieszów
- Gmina: Hrubieszów
- Elevation: 200 m (660 ft)

Population
  - Total: 213
- Time zone: UTC+1 (CET)
  - Summer (DST): UTC+2 (CEST)

Kozodawy [kɔzɔˈdavɨ] is a village in the administrative district of Gmina Hrubieszów, within Hrubieszów County, Lublin Voivodeship, in eastern Poland, close to the border with Ukraine.

== History ==
Twelve Polish citizens were murdered by Nazi Germany in the village during World War II.
