= Nowosiółki, Hrubieszów County =

Nowosiółki
- Village
- Location within Poland
- Coordinates: 50°50′45″N 23°50′8″E
- Country: Poland
- Voivodeship: Lublin
- County: Hrubieszów
- Gmina: Hrubieszów
- Elevation: 230 m (750 ft)
- Population: 285

Nowosiółki [nɔvɔˈɕuu̯kʲi] is a village in the administrative district of Gmina Hrubieszów, within Hrubieszów County, Lublin Voivodeship, in eastern Poland, close to the border with Ukraine. The first mention of Nowosiółki dates back to 1445.
