= Kułakowice Trzecie =

- Village
- Location within Poland
- Coordinates: 50°54′48″N 23°48′1″E
- Country: Poland
- Voivodeship: Lublin
- County: Hrubieszów
- Gmina: Hrubieszów
- Elevation: 235 m (771 ft)
- Population: 305

Kułakowice Trzecie [kuwakɔˈvit͡sɛ ˈtʂɛt͡ɕɛ] is a village in the administrative district of Gmina Hrubieszów, within Hrubieszów County, Lublin Voivodeship, in eastern Poland, close to the border with Ukraine.
