= Świerszczów, Hrubieszów County =

Świerszczów
- Village
- Location within Poland
- Coordinates: 50°49′16″N 23°54′22″E
- Country: Poland
- Voivodeship: Lublin
- County: Hrubieszów
- Gmina: Hrubieszów
- Elevation: 190 m (620 ft)
- Population: 257

Świerszczów (Polish pronunciation: [ˈɕfjɛrʂt͡ʂuf]) is a village in the administrative district of Gmina Hrubieszów, within Hrubieszów County, Lublin Voivodeship, in eastern Poland, close to the border with Ukraine.
