= Kobło, Lublin Voivodeship =

Kobło
- Village
- Location within Poland
- Coordinates: 50°52′11″N 23°57′45″E
- Country: Poland
- Voivodeship: Lublin
- County: Hrubieszów
- Gmina: Hrubieszów
- Elevation: 230 m (750 ft)
- Population: 328

Kobło [ˈkɔbwɔ] is a village in the administrative district of Gmina Hrubieszów, within Hrubieszów County, Lublin Voivodeship, in eastern Poland, close to the border with Ukraine.
