= Brodzica =

- Village
- Location within Poland
- Coordinates: 50°47′32″N 23°50′40″E
- Country: Poland
- Voivodeship: Lublin
- County: Hrubieszów
- Gmina: Hrubieszów
- Elevation: 190 m (620 ft)
- Population: 353
- Website: http://www.brodzica.info/

Brodzica [brɔˈd͡ʑit͡sa] is a village in the administrative district of Gmina Hrubieszów, within Hrubieszów County, Lublin Voivodeship, in eastern Poland, close to the border with Ukraine.
