= Annopol, Hrubieszów County =

Annopol
- Village
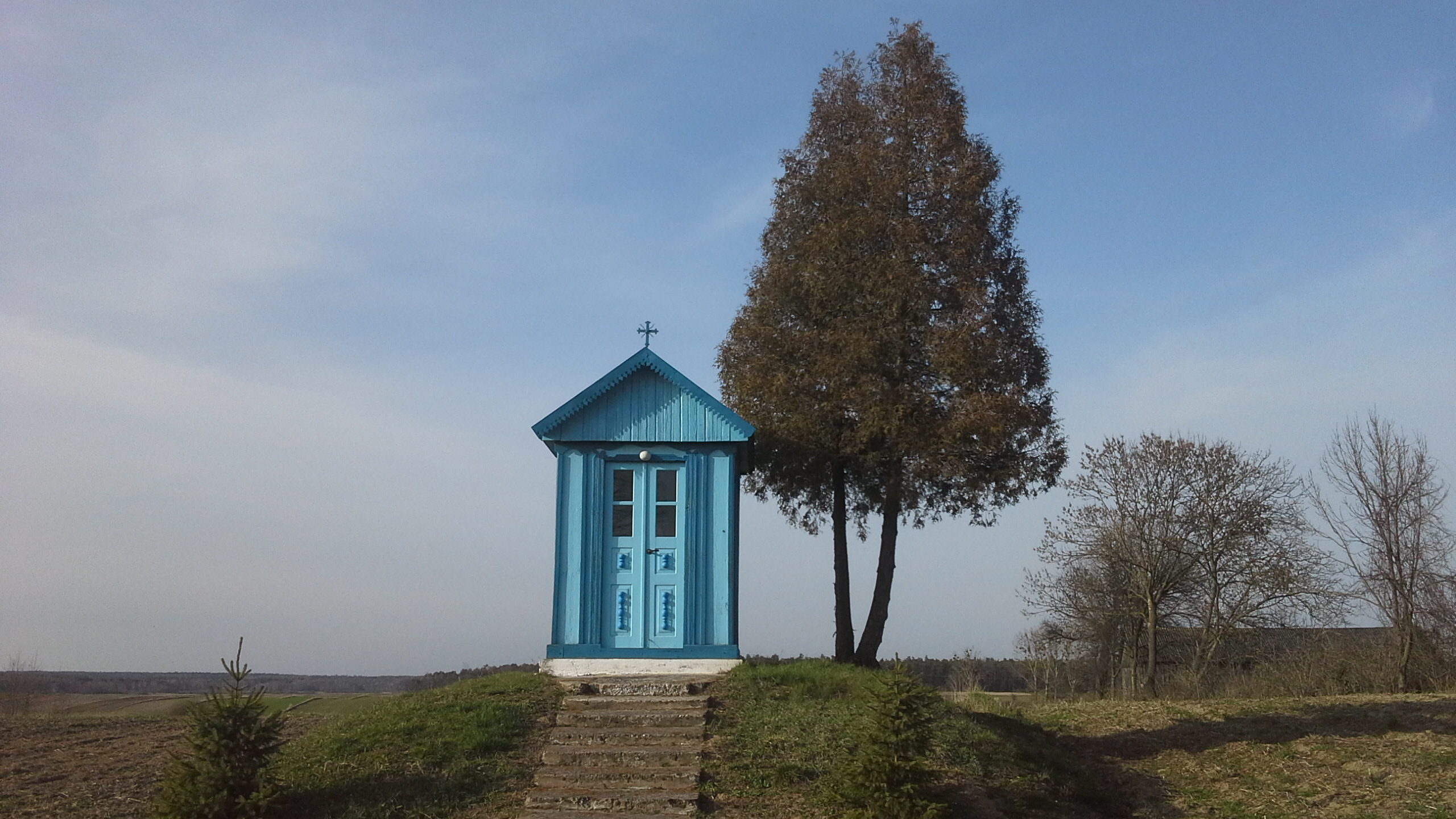

- Location within Poland
- Coordinates: 50°54′28″N 23°54′14″E
- Country: Poland
- Voivodeship: Lublin
- County: Hrubieszów
- Gmina: Hrubieszów
- Elevation: 215 m (705 ft)

Population
  - Total: 176
- Time zone: UTC+1 (CET)
  - Summer (DST): UTC+2 (CEST)

Annopol [aˈnːɔpɔl] is a village in the administrative district of Gmina Hrubieszów, within Hrubieszów County, Lublin Voivodeship, in eastern Poland, close to the border with Ukraine.
