= Obrowiec, Lublin Voivodeship =

Obrowiec
- Village
- Location within Poland
- Coordinates: 50°49′8″N 23°50′3″E
- Country: Poland
- Voivodeship: Lublin
- County: Hrubieszów
- Gmina: Hrubieszów
- Elevation: 220 m (720 ft)
- Population: 480

Obrowiec [ɔˈbrɔvjɛt͡s] is a village in the administrative district of Gmina Hrubieszów, within Hrubieszów County, Lublin Voivodeship, in eastern Poland, close to the border with Ukraine.
