= Kosmów, Lublin Voivodeship =

Kosmów
- Village
- Location within Poland
- Coordinates: 50°43′8″N 24°1′12″E
- Country: Poland
- Voivodeship: Lublin
- County: Hrubieszów
- Gmina: Hrubieszów
- Population: 351

Kosmów [ˈkɔsmuf] is a village in the administrative district of Gmina Hrubieszów, within Hrubieszów County, Lublin Voivodeship, in eastern Poland, close to the border with Ukraine.
