= Kułakowice Drugie =

- Village
- Location within Poland
- Coordinates: 50°53′30″N 23°48′36″E
- Country: Poland
- Voivodeship: Lublin
- County: Hrubieszów
- Gmina: Hrubieszów
- Elevation: 225 m (738 ft)
- Population: 73

Kułakowice Drugie [kuwakɔˈvit͡sɛ ˈdruɡʲɛ] is a village in the administrative district of Gmina Hrubieszów, within Hrubieszów County, Lublin Voivodeship, in eastern Poland, close to the border with Ukraine.
