= Wolica, Hrubieszów County =

Wolica
- Village
- Location within Poland
- Coordinates: 50°47′27″N 23°51′54″E
- Country: Poland
- Voivodeship: Lublin
- County: Hrubieszów
- Gmina: Hrubieszów
- Elevation: 190 m (620 ft)
- Population: 270

Wolica [vɔˈlit͡sa] is a village in the administrative district of Gmina Hrubieszów, within Hrubieszów County, Lublin Voivodeship, in eastern Poland, close to the border with Ukraine.
