= Czumów =

- Village
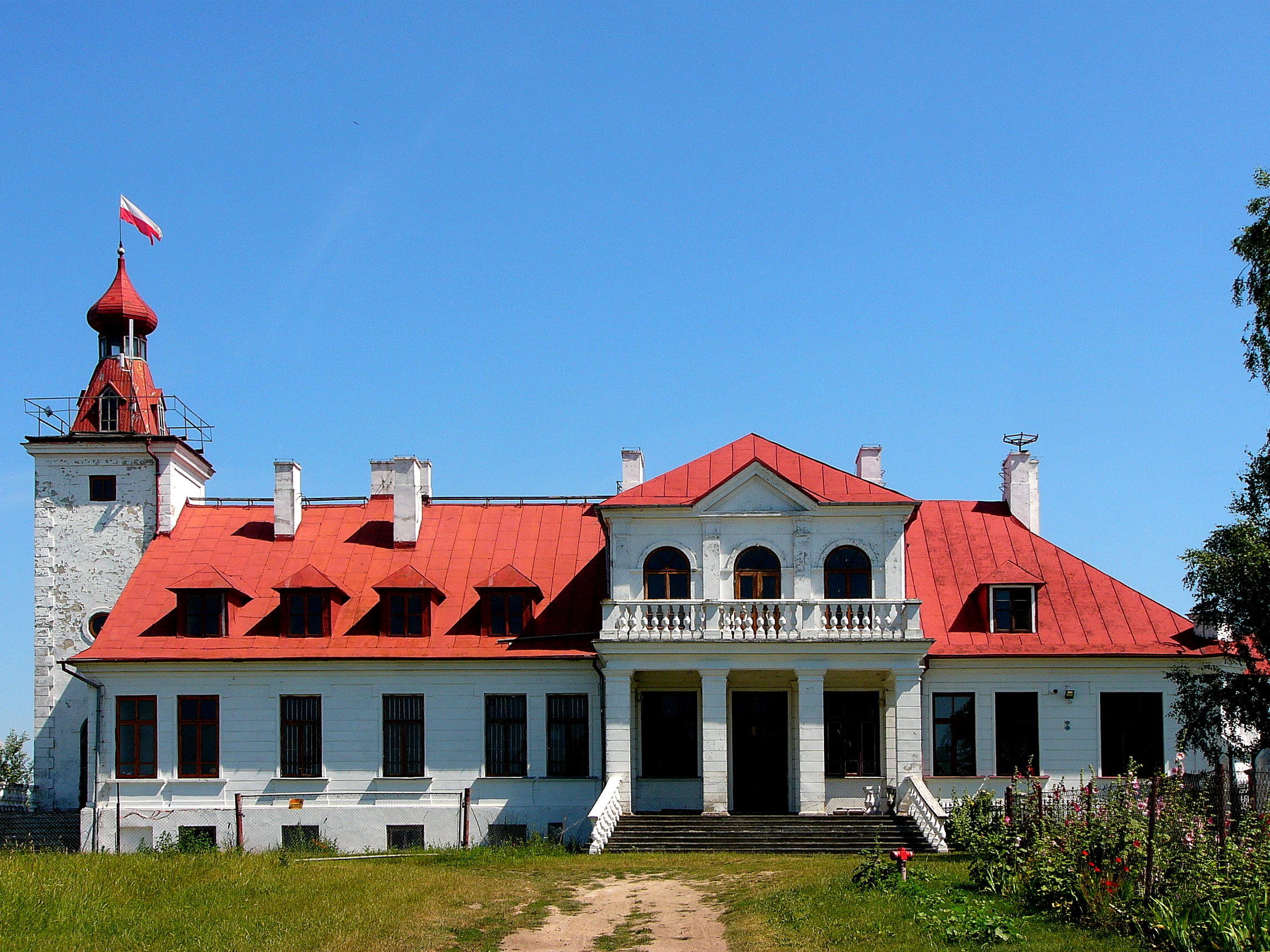
- Czumów Palace

- Location within Poland
- Coordinates: 50°46′13″N 23°58′7″E
- Country: Poland
- Voivodeship: Lublin
- County: Hrubieszów
- Gmina: Hrubieszów
- Elevation: 190 m (620 ft)

Population
  - Total: 304
- Time zone: UTC+1 (CET)
  - Summer (DST): UTC+2 (CEST)
- Vehicle registration: LHR

Czumów ([ˈt͡ʂumuf]; Ukrainian: Чамів) is a village in the administrative district of Gmina Hrubieszów, within Hrubieszów County, Lublin Voivodeship, in eastern Poland, close to the border with Ukraine.
