= Gmina Hrubieszów =

Gmina Hrubieszów Hrubieszów Commune
- Gmina
- Coat of arms
- Interactive map of Gmina Hrubieszów
- Coordinates (Hrubieszów): 50°49′N 23°53′E
- Country: Poland
- Voivodeship: Lublin
- County: Hrubieszów
- Seat: Hrubieszów

Area
  - Total: 259.2 km^{2} (100.1 sq mi)

Population (2013)
  - Total: 10,382
  - Density: 40.05/km^{2} (103.7/sq mi)
- Website: http://www.hrubieszow-gmina.pl/

Gmina Hrubieszów is a rural gmina (administrative district) in Hrubieszów County, Lublin Voivodeship, in eastern Poland, on the border with Ukraine. Its seat is the town of Hrubieszów, although the town is not part of the territory of the gmina.

The gmina covers an area of 259.2 square kilometres (100.1 sq mi), and as of 2006 its total population is 10,875 (10,382 in 2013).

The gmina contains part of the protected area called Strzelce Landscape Park.

== Villages ==
Gmina Hrubieszów contains the villages and settlements of Annopol, Białoskóry, Brodzica, Cichobórz, Czerniczyn, Czortowice, Czumów, Dąbrowa, Dziekanów, Gródek, Husynne, Janki, Kobło, Kosmów, Kozodawy, Kułakowice Drugie, Kułakowice Pierwsze, Kułakowice Trzecie, Łotoszyny, Masłomęcz, Metelin, Mieniany, Moniatycze, Moniatycze-Kolonia, Moroczyn, Nowosiółki, Obrowiec, Ślipcze, Stefankowice, Stefankowice-Kolonia, Świerszczów, Szpikołosy, Teptiuków, Turkołówka, Ubrodowice, Wołajowice, Wolica and Wołynka.

== Neighbouring gminas ==
Gmina Hrubieszów is bordered by the town of Hrubieszów and by the gminas of Białopole, Horodło, Mircze, Trzeszczany, Uchanie and Werbkowice. It also borders Ukraine.
