= Czerniczyn =

- Village
- Location within Poland
- Coordinates: 50°45′16″N 23°53′58″E
- Country: Poland
- Voivodeship: Lublin
- County: Hrubieszów
- Gmina: Hrubieszów
- Elevation: 205 m (673 ft)
- Population: 797

Czerniczyn [t͡ʂɛrˈɲit͡ʂɨn] is a village in the administrative district of Gmina Hrubieszów, within Hrubieszów County, Lublin Voivodeship, in eastern Poland, close to the border with Ukraine.
