= Metelin, Hrubieszów County =

Metelin
- Village
- Location within Poland
- Coordinates: 50°44′41″N 23°50′34″E
- Country: Poland
- Voivodeship: Lublin
- County: Hrubieszów
- Gmina: Hrubieszów
- Elevation: 210 m (690 ft)
- Population: 260

Metelin [mɛˈtɛlin] is a village in the administrative district of Gmina Hrubieszów, within Hrubieszów County, Lublin Voivodeship, in eastern Poland, close to the border with Ukraine.
