= Salzmünde group =

Salzmünde Group
- Geographical range: central and lower Saal region, exclave in the region of Leipzig and Altenburg
- Period: Middle Neolithic
- Dates: 3400 BC - 3000 BC.
- Type site: Salzmünde-Schiepzig, Saalekreis
- Characteristics: Pottery of the Opperschöner Type, Amphorae, clay drums
- Preceded by: Funnelbeaker culture
- Followed by: Globular Amphora culture, Corded Ware culture

The Salzmünde Group or Salzmünde Culture (German: Salzmünder Gruppe / Salzmünder Kultur) is the name for a late group from the Funnelbeaker culture in central Saale-Elbe region of Germany, which existed between 3400 and 3000 BC during the Neolithic period.

== Context ==
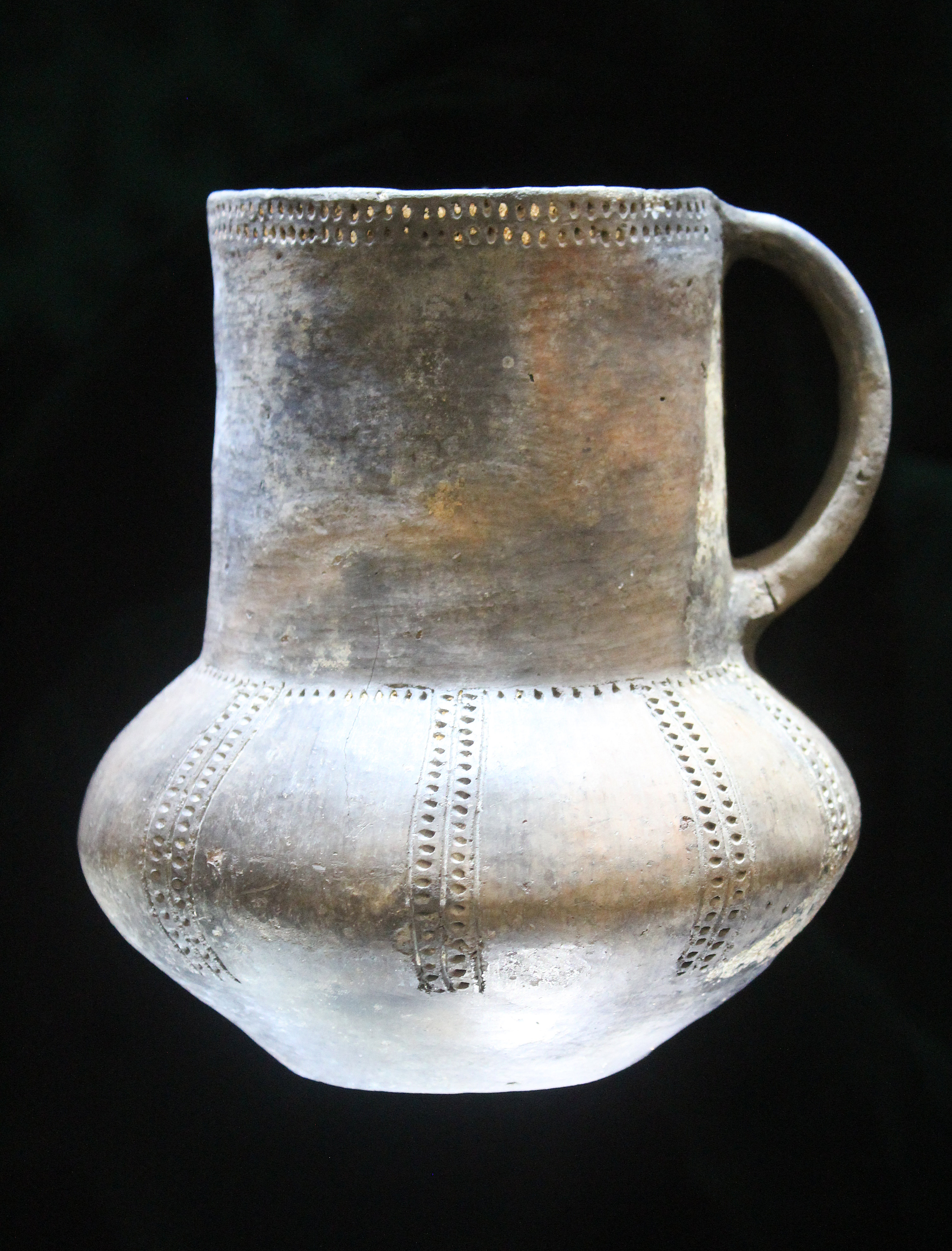
Ceramic vessel

The type site, Salzmünde-Schiepzig (Saalekreis) was excavated by Nils Niklasson in 1921. He attributed the finds to a "nordic culture" which in his opinion also included the Baalberge group. In 1938, Paul Grimm grouped Niklasson's "nordic culture" and the Opperschöner pottery style together as the Salzmünde culture.

Distinguishing the central and east German prehistoric groups (Hutburg, Walternienburg-Bernburg, Salzmünde und Schöningen) from one another is notoriously difficult with dramatic differences from author to author. For this reason, Johannes Müller argues they should all be understood as subgroups within the Funnelbeaker culture.

The Salzmünde group fits in the middle Neolithic according to the North German chronology, but in the Younger Neolithic according to Jens Lüning's South and West German chronology. In the central Saale-Elbe region, the Salzmünde ceramic style is the local expression of Funnelbeaker phases TRB-MES IV and V. In Bohemia, the latest material from the funnelbeaker culture (TRB C) belongs to the Salzmünde Group, which lasted longer here than in central Germany.

== Settlement pattern ==
Some walled hilltop settlements are known, such as Halle, Dölauer Heide, Salzmünde-Schiepzig, Mücheln and Wallendorf. The settlement of Halle, Dölauer Heide was surrounded by a two-metre-deep (6.6 ft) ditch with a palisade on the inside. The irregularly shaped fortifications enclose the entire plateau of the hill and were supplemented by at least two towers.

Most of the settlements of the Salzmünde Group are inadequately explored or have not been published. The type site, Salzmünde-Schiepzig, was destroyed by sand-mining and is only poorly published. The settlement of Karsdorf, Burgenlandkreis has yielded numerous Salzmünde finds.

== Material remains ==
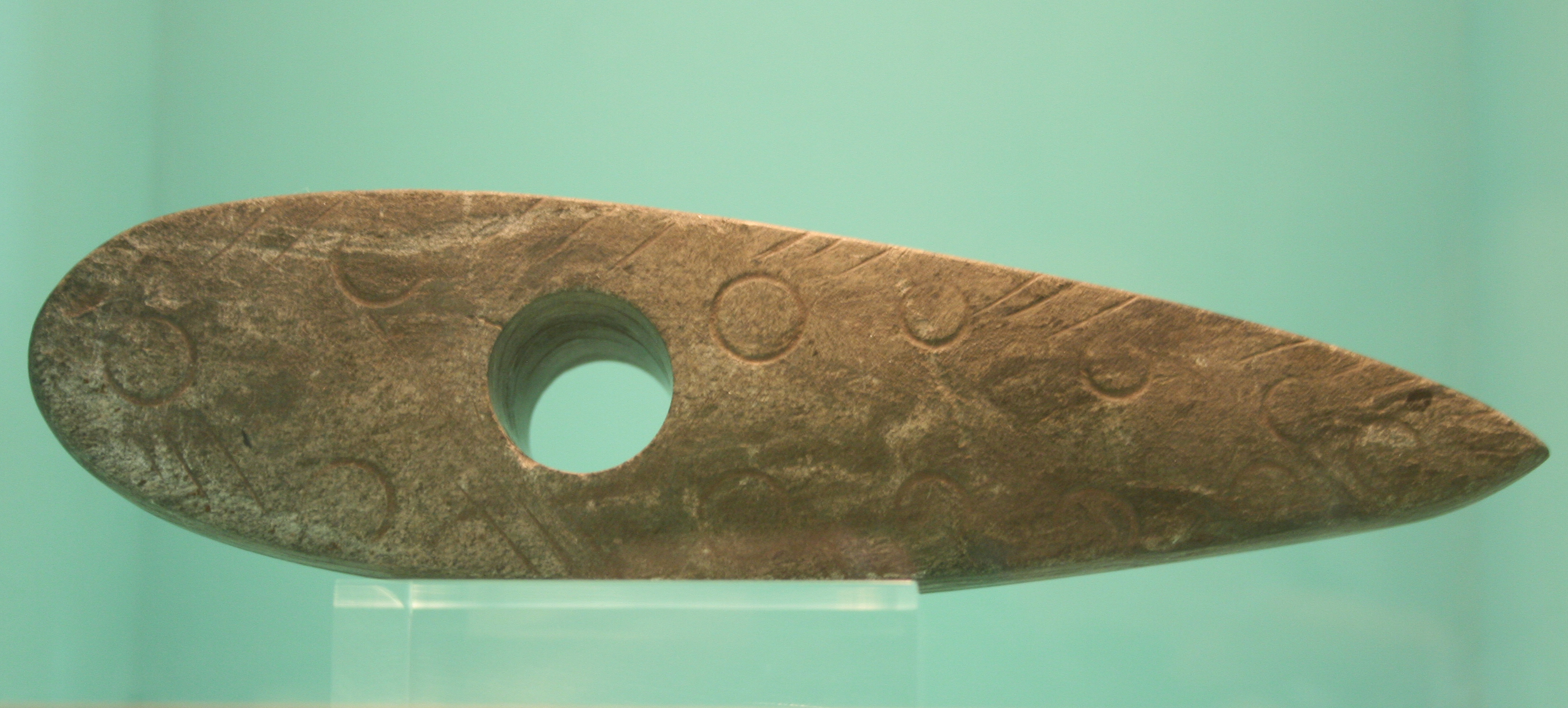
Decorated stone axe

One or two handled pots of the Oppenschöner Type, amphorae, funnel rimmed bowls and decorated clay drums are characteristic of the Salzmünde group. Decorated ornamental axes of the Saxon type have often been attributed to the Salzmünde group, but they are generally isolated finds.

== Funerary practices ==
Settlement and tumulus burials occur, as well as stone cist graves and walled chamber graves. However burial in the ground, with the body laid on one side and the feet drawn up is most common. Grave offerings are usually meagre.In addition to inhumation graves with crouched burials, some dead were placed beneath thick layers of pottery sherds and the remains of burnt houses.

== Subdivisions ==
Jonas Beran proposed a periodisation of the Salzmünde group in to periods with type sites at Zauschwitz and Mücheln respectively. From radiocarbon analysis of the pottery it is possible to distinguish Salzmünde A, B and C, which can be matched up to the respective periods of the Funnelbeaker culture.

== Genetics ==
In a 2017 genetic study published in Nature, the remains of three individuals ascribed to the Salzmünde group were analyzed. Of the two samples of Y-DNA extracted, one belonged to G2a2a1, and one belonged to IJK. mtDNA extracted were two samples of H2, and one sample of U3a1.

== Bibliography ==
- Jonas Beran. 1993. "Untersuchungen zur Stellung der Salzmünder Kultur im Jungneolithikum des Saalegebietes". In: Beiträge zur Ur- und Frühgeschichte Mitteleuropas. Vol. 2 Wilkau-Haßlau.
- Cultural Association of the GDR (Ed.). 1972. Typentafeln zur Ur- und Frühgeschichte. [Edited R. Feustel/S. Barthel] Weimar.
- Johannes Müller. 2001. Soziochronologische Studien zum Jung- und Spätneolithikum im Mittelelbe-Saale-Gebiet (4100-2700 v. Chr.). Vorgeschichtliche Forschungen 21. Rahden, Leidorf.
- Johannes Müller. 1999. Radiocarbonchronologie – Keramiktechnologie – Osteologie - Anthropologie-Raumanalyse. Beiträge zum Neolithikum und zur Frühbronzezeit im Mittelelbe-Saale-Gebiet. 80. Ber. RGK, 25-211.
- Lipson, Mark (November 16, 2017). "Parallel palaeogenomic transects reveal complex genetic history of early European farmers". Nature. 551 (7680). Nature Research: 368–372. Bibcode:2017Natur.551..368L. doi:10.1038/nature24476. PMC 5973800. PMID 29144465.
- Narasimhan, Vagheesh M. (September 6, 2019). "The formation of human populations in South and Central Asia". Science. 365 (6457). American Association for the Advancement of Science. bioRxiv 10.1101/292581. doi:10.1126/science.aat7487. PMC 6822619. PMID 31488661.
- Joachim Preuß. 1996. Das Neolithikum in Mitteleuropa, Kulturen - Wirtschaft - Umwelt vom 6. bis 3. Jahrtausend v. u. Z. Weißenbach, Beier und Beran.
- Giannina Schindler. 1994. "Salzmünder Kultur." In H.-J. Beier and R. Einicke (Edd.), Das Neolithikum im Mittelelbe-Saale-Gebiet. Eine Übersicht und ein Abriß zum Stand der Forschung. Verlag Beier & Beran. Wilkau-Hasslau. 1994. 145-158. ISBN 3-930036-05-3
