= Gródek, Hrubieszów County =

Gródek
- Village
- Interactive map of Gródek
- Location within Poland
- Coordinates: 50°48′15″N 23°57′3″E
- Country: Poland
- Voivodeship: Lublin
- County: Hrubieszów
- Gmina: Hrubieszów
- Elevation: 185 m (607 ft)
- Population: 332

Gródek [ˈɡrudɛk] is a village in the administrative district of Gmina Hrubieszów, within Hrubieszów County, Lublin Voivodeship, in eastern Poland, close to the border with Ukraine.
