= Chłaniów =

- Village
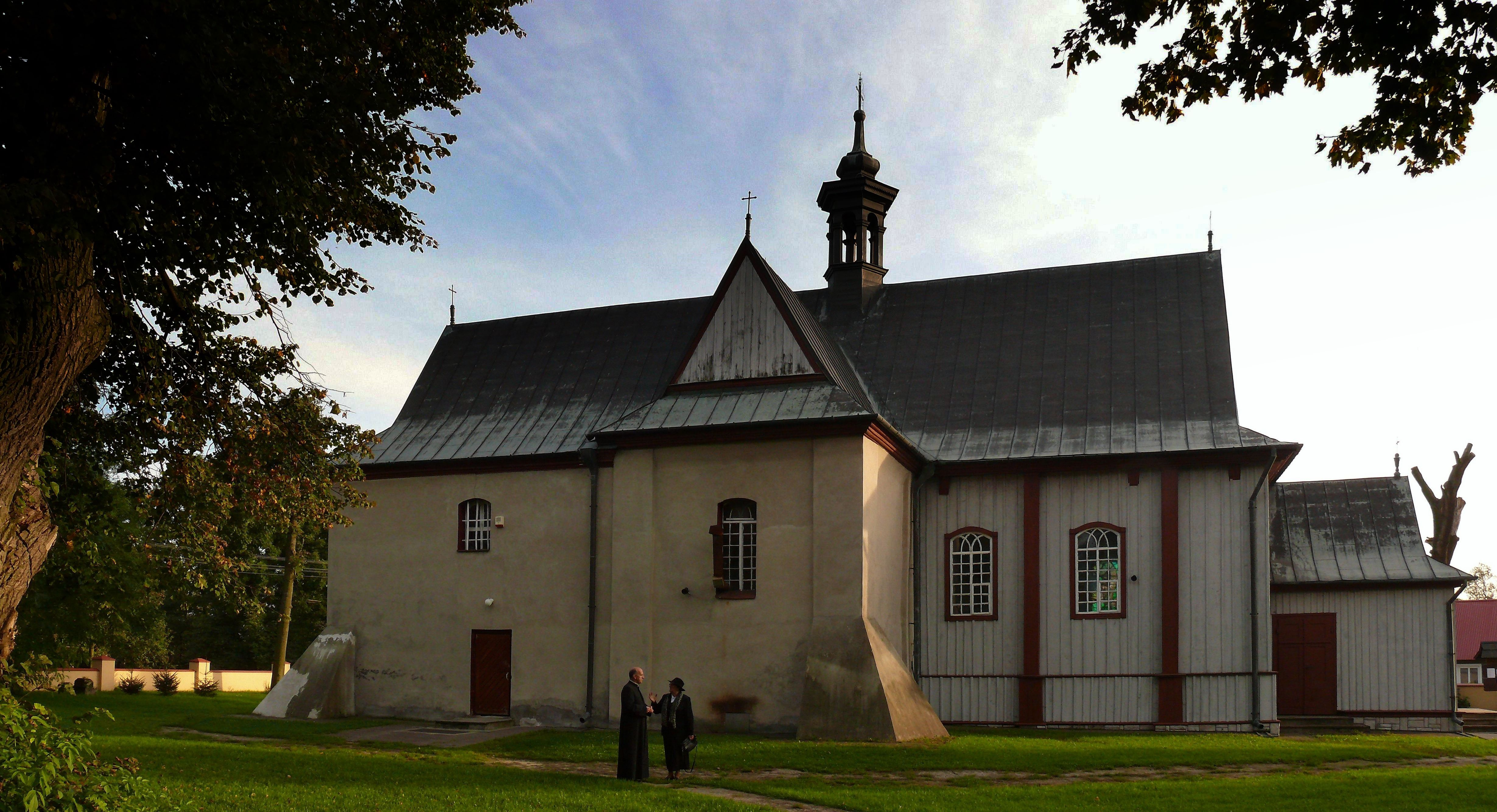
- Church of Saint Matthew

- Location within Poland
- Coordinates: 50°50′N 22°53′E
- Country: Poland
- Voivodeship: Lublin
- County: Krasnystaw
- Gmina: Żółkiewka

Chłaniów [ˈxwaɲuf] is a village in the administrative district of Gmina Żółkiewka, within Krasnystaw County, Lublin Voivodeship, in eastern Poland.

On 23 July 1944, as revenge for the killing by Polish partisans of an SS officer, the village of Chłaniów, together with nearby Władysławin, was burned down by the Ukrainian Self-Defense Legion. Overall, 44 residents died in the two villages. One of the officers ordering the attack was allegedly Michael Karkoc, who lived openly in Minnesota, USA until his death in 2019.
