= Wołynka =

- Village
- Location within Poland
- Coordinates: 50°44′41″N 24°0′18″E
- Country: Poland
- Voivodeship: Lublin
- County: Hrubieszów
- Gmina: Hrubieszów
- Population: 50

Wołynka [vɔˈwɨŋka] is a village in the administrative district of Gmina Hrubieszów, within Hrubieszów County, Lublin Voivodeship, in eastern Poland, close to the border with Ukraine.
