= Stefankowice-Kolonia =

- Village
- Location within Poland
- Coordinates: 50°54′54″N 23°49′38″E
- Country: Poland
- Voivodeship: Lublin
- County: Hrubieszów
- Gmina: Hrubieszów
- Elevation: 235 m (771 ft)
- Population: 289

Stefankowice-Kolonia [stɛfaŋkɔˈvit͡sɛ kɔˈlɔɲa] is a village in the administrative district of Gmina Hrubieszów, within Hrubieszów County, Lublin Voivodeship, in eastern Poland, close to the border with Ukraine.
