= Dąbrowa, Gmina Hrubieszów =

Dąbrowa
- Village
- Location within Poland
- Coordinates: 50°50′24″N 23°54′33″E
- Country: Poland
- Voivodeship: Lublin
- County: Hrubieszów
- Gmina: Hrubieszów
- Elevation: 205 m (673 ft)
- Population: 188

Dąbrowa [dɔmˈbrɔva] is a village in the administrative district of Gmina Hrubieszów, within Hrubieszów County, Lublin Voivodeship, in eastern Poland, close to the border with Ukraine.
