= Masłomęcz =

- Village
- Location within Poland
- Coordinates: 50°43′25″N 23°53′36″E
- Country: Poland
- Voivodeship: Lublin
- County: Hrubieszów
- Gmina: Hrubieszów
- Elevation: 205 m (673 ft)
- Population: 404

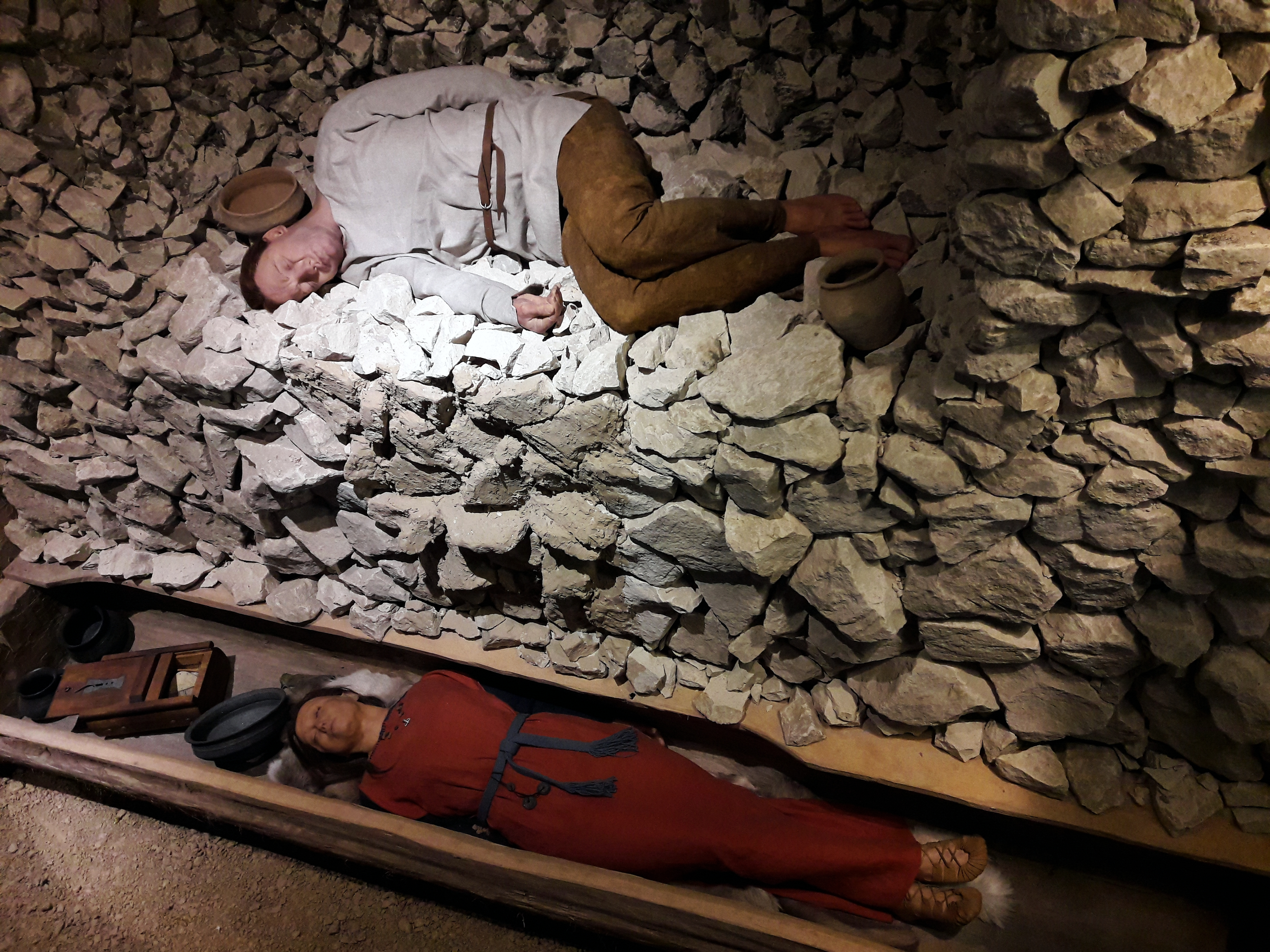
Reconstruction of the 3rd century Gothic grave from Masłomęcz in the National Museum of Lublin.

Masłomęcz [maˈswɔmɛnt͡ʂ] is a village in the administrative district of Gmina Hrubieszów, within Hrubieszów County, Lublin Voivodeship, in eastern Poland, close to the border with Ukraine.
