= Stefankowice =

- Village
- Location within Poland
- Coordinates: 50°54′18″N 23°50′57″E
- Country: Poland
- Voivodeship: Lublin
- County: Hrubieszów
- Gmina: Hrubieszów
- Elevation: 215 m (705 ft)
- Population: 255

Stefankowice [stɛfaŋkɔˈvit͡sɛ] is a village in the administrative district of Gmina Hrubieszów, within Hrubieszów County, Lublin Voivodeship, in eastern Poland, close to the border with Ukraine.
