= Dziekanów =

- Village
- Location within Poland
- Coordinates: 50°51′41″N 23°51′45″E
- Country: Poland
- Voivodeship: Lublin
- County: Hrubieszów
- Gmina: Hrubieszów
- Elevation: 210 m (690 ft)
- Population: 578

Dziekanów [d͡ʑɛˈkanuf] is a village in the administrative district of Gmina Hrubieszów, within Hrubieszów County, Lublin Voivodeship, in eastern Poland, close to the border with Ukraine.
