= Moroczyn =

- Village
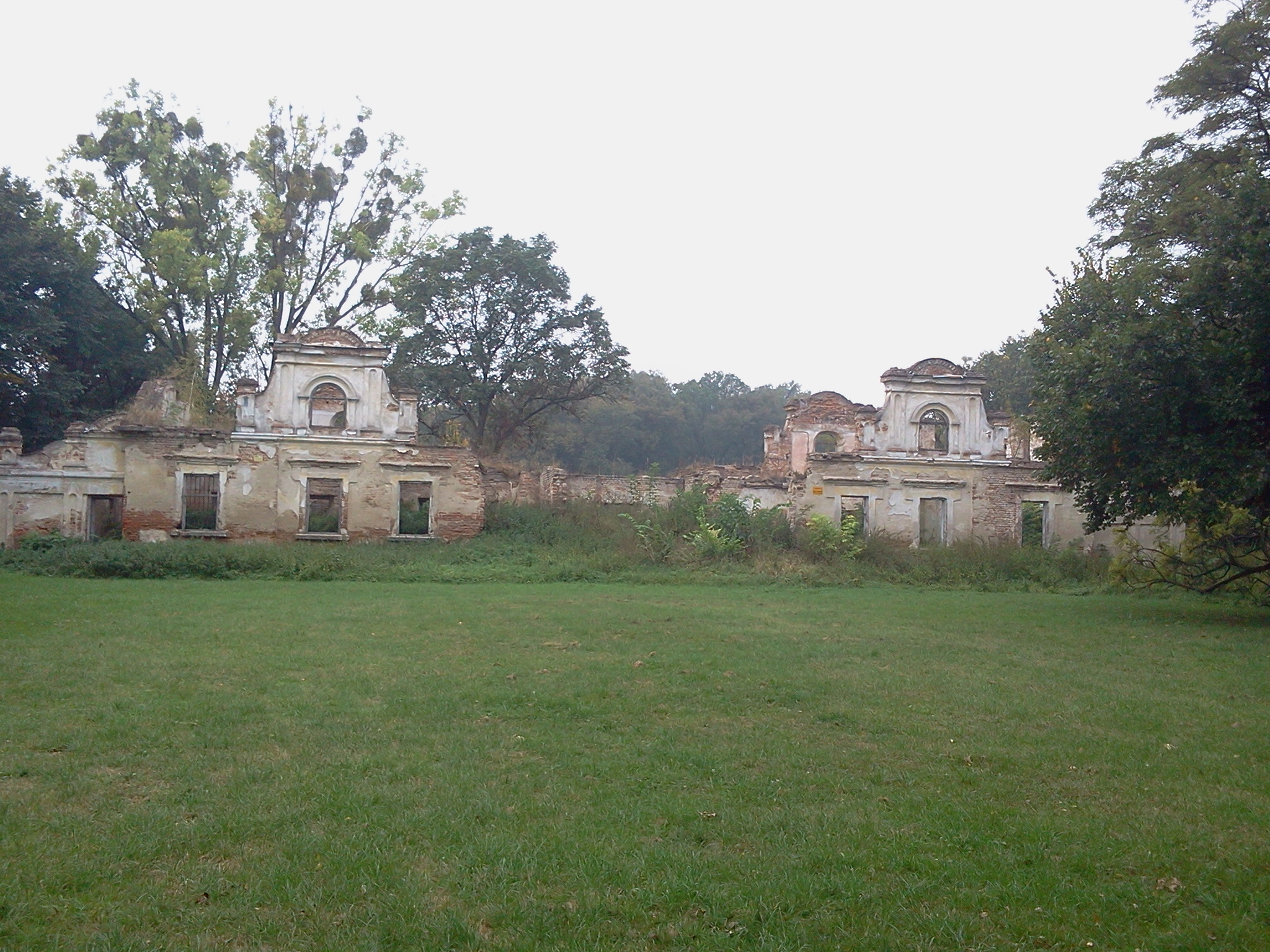
- Ruins of the Chrzanowski family (Poraj coat of arms) manor

- Location within Poland
- Coordinates: 50°50′N 23°56′E
- Country: Poland
- Voivodeship: Lublin
- County: Hrubieszów
- Gmina: Hrubieszów
- Elevation: 195 m (640 ft)

Population
  - Total: 346
- Time zone: UTC+1 (CET)
  - Summer (DST): UTC+2 (CEST)

Moroczyn [mɔˈrɔt͡ʂɨn] is a village in the administrative district of Gmina Hrubieszów, within Hrubieszów County, Lublin Voivodeship, in eastern Poland, close to the border with Ukraine.

== History ==
Eight Polish citizens were murdered by Nazi Germany in the village during World War II.
