= Massacre at 111 Marszałkowska Street, Warsaw =

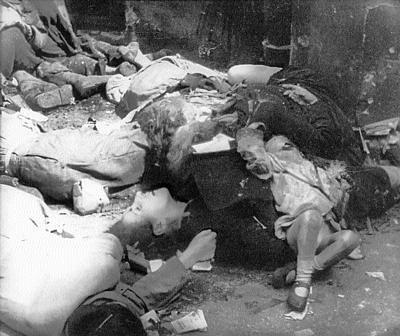
A frame from an insurgent film chronicle depicting the victims of the execution at 111 Marszałkowska St.

The massacre at 111 Marszałkowska Street - a crime against the civilian population of Warsaw committed by the Germans during the Warsaw Uprising. On August 3, 1944, next to the "Pod Światełkami" tavern, the crew of a German armoured car shot about 20-44 Polish civilians - residents of tenement houses on Marszałkowska Street No. 109, 111, 113.

== The massacre ==
During the first days of August 1944, the section of Marszałkowska Street enclosed by Chmielna and Złota Streets was not overtaken by major insurgent fights. On August 3, around 11:00 a.m., a German armoured car arrived there and started shooting at surrounding houses while driving north on Marszałkowska Street. The vehicle then stopped in front of tenement house no. 113, where a small group of soldiers got out. They entered the courtyard of the tenement house and then went to the grounds of the neighbouring house number 111. (Note: The building, which does not exist today, was located approximately at the crossroads of Marszałkowska Street and Chmielna Street, in the area of the present Parade Square.) According to Piotr Grzywacz, an inhabitant of that house, the unit consisted of one German and eight "Ukrainians" (Note: The collaborators from the eastern volunteer formations who suppressed Warsaw were collectively described by the inhabitants of the capital as "Ukrainians" or "Kalmyks", and these terms most often appear in their recollections. This was largely due to the impression that information about crimes committed by Ukrainian nationalists in Kresy Wschodnie had evoked throughout Poland. In reality, Ukrainian troops did not participate much in the uprising fights. So it is difficult to determine the nationality of these collaborators. In this case, they could indeed have been Ukrainians from the SS auxiliary units located in Szucha Avenue. See: Ludność cywilna w powstaniu warszawskim tom II Archiwalia, op.cit., p. 46-47.) dressed in SS uniforms. In the report of the commander of the Warsaw District of the Home Army, General Albin Skroczyński, pseudonym "Łaszcz", six soldiers, mostly Ukrainians, were mentioned. ('Situation report No 5 on the German repression of civilians in the Jerozolimskie Avenue region', 4 August 1944).

The SS men ordered the inhabitants to go to the courtyard immediately (the order was issued in German, Polish and "Russian"). About 40 people obeyed the order. The soldiers gathered everyone in front of the "Pod Światełkami" tavern and shot them with machine guns. It is not entirely clear how many civilians fell victims to this execution. In the "Łaszcz" report there was a reference to 20-30 murdered people. According to Piotr Grzywacz, there were 37 victims. Maja Motyl and Stanisław Rutkowski, authors of the study "Warsaw Uprising - the register of places and facts of crime", assessed the number of people killed at 44. The victims of the massacre were residents of houses at Marszałkowska Street: 109, 111, 113. Women and children were among the murdered.

After the murder, the German sub-unit tried to leave the tenement house, but it was prevented from doing so by insurgent fire from the "Metropol" hotel building. (Marszałkowska St., corner of Złota St.). The Germans stayed in the house for the next day. On August 4, an assault section from the staff unit of the Warsaw Home Army District broke into the tenement house, where they captured two "Ukrainians", the remaining SS men were killed during the exchange of fire. (Note: Witness Piotr Grzywacz claimed that two insurgents died in the battle, but in the "Łaszcz" report there is not a single word about it.) The prisoners confessed to carrying out the murder of civilians, claiming that they were following orders of their commanding officer, a German. They were both shot after the interrogation.
