= Clay drum (archaeology) =

Type of prehistoric ceramic drum

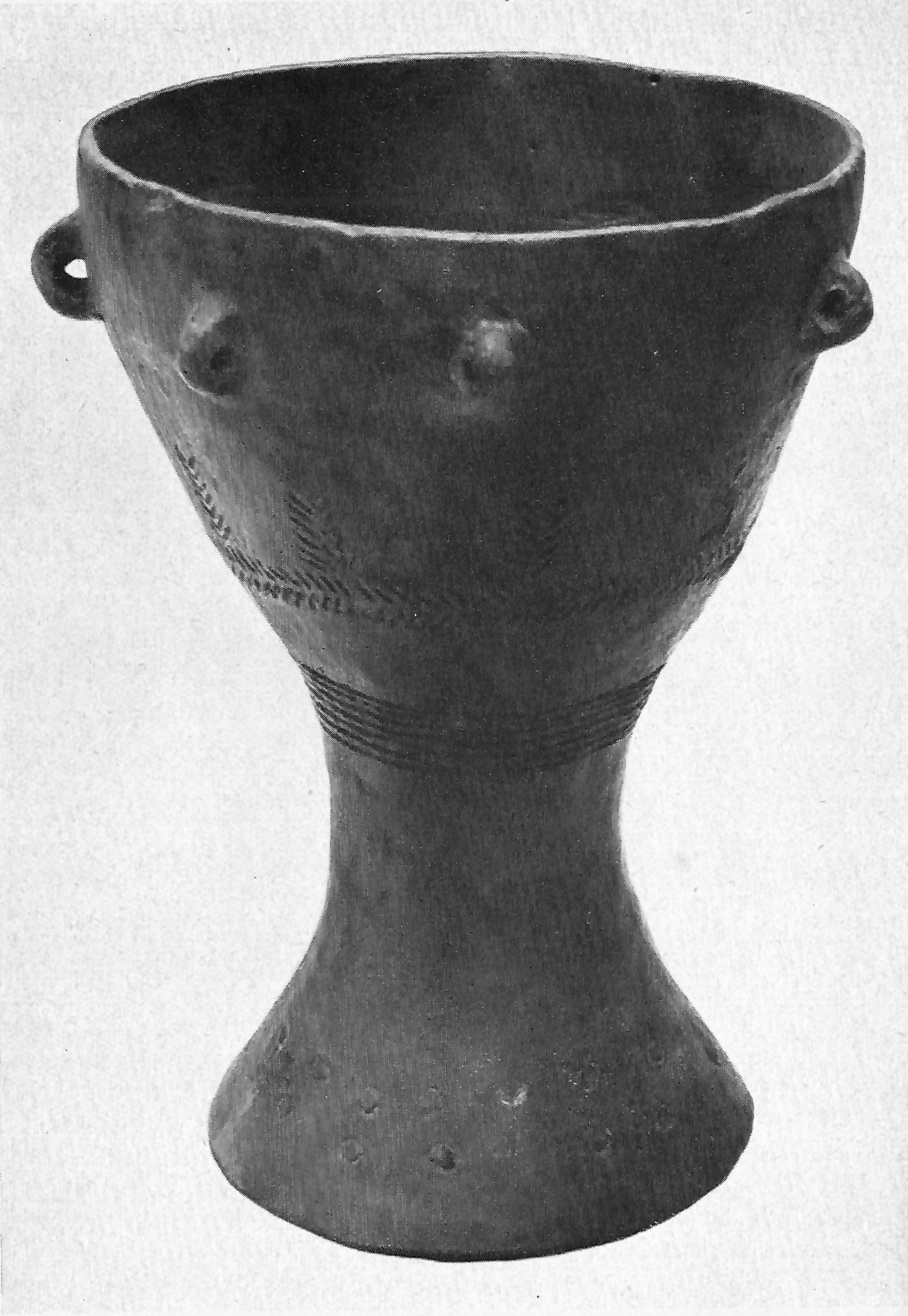
Drum from the fishing tomb in Ebendorf (26 cm high)

Clay drums (German Tontrommeln) are ceramic objects in the shape of an hourglass, eggcup or tulip with no feet, with a ring of up to 15 holes at either end. They are typical of southeastern groups within the Funnelbeaker culture, particularly the Walternienburg-Bernburg group, but are also found in southern successor groups of the Michelsberg culture. They are often well decorated and, unlike collar bottles, are often found completely shattered.

== Find spots ==
Around 200 clay drums have been found in German Megalithic complexes (e.g. Barskamp, Oldendorf in Landkreis Lüneburg), in settlements of the Walternienburg-Bernburg culture (Dölauer Heide) and in pit houses. One richly decorated, smashed clay drum was found in the Lower Franconian cemetery of Großeibstadt. Examples from the Wartburg culture were found in the gallery graves of Calden and Warburg. Another 20 or so examples have been found further afield in Denmark, Kujawy and Czech Republic.

== Cultures ==
The double cone or tulip shaped clay drums found to date belong to the late Neolithic Globular Amphora Culture and to several subgroups of the Funnelbeaker culture, especially the Walternienburg-Bernburg group, the Havelland group, the Salzmünde group, the Schönfeld group and the Wartberg group.

== Function ==
Hermann Müller-Karpe raised the question of whether the drums were actually musical instruments in 1974. They could also be beakers for libations, with skin or cloth across the openings. Reports from Großeibstädt mention that they contained liquid, which is not further identified. The question remains open.

== Bibliography ==
- J. Schween. "Trommeln und heilige Hörner" Archäologie in Deutschland 2002/2.
- M. Stock. "Musik in der Jungsteinzeit" in H. Meller (Ed.), Schönheit, Macht und Tod. 120 Funde aus 120 Jahren Landesmuseum für Vorgeschichte Halle. Companion to the 2001 Temporary Exhibition, Halle (Saale), pp. 192f.
