= Białoskóry, Lublin Voivodeship =

Białoskóry
- Village
- Location within Poland
- Coordinates: 50°54′27″N 23°54′26″E
- Country: Poland
- Voivodeship: Lublin
- County: Hrubieszów
- Gmina: Hrubieszów

Białoskóry [bʲawɔsˈkurɨ] is a village in the administrative district of Gmina Hrubieszów, within Hrubieszów County, Lublin Voivodeship, in eastern Poland, close to the border with Ukraine.
