= Władysławin =

- Village
- Location within Poland
- Coordinates: 50°50′12″N 22°53′33″E
- Country: Poland
- Voivodeship: Lublin
- County: Krasnystaw
- Gmina: Żółkiewka

Władysławin [vwadɨˈswavin] is a village in the administrative district of Gmina Żółkiewka, within Krasnystaw County, Lublin Voivodeship, in eastern Poland.

On July 23, 1944, as revenge for the killing by Polish partisans of an SS officer, the village of Władysławin, together with nearby Chłaniów, was burned down by the Ukrainian Self-Defense Legion. Overall, 44 residents died in the two villages.
