= Johannes Müller (archaeologist) =

German archaeologist and prehistorian

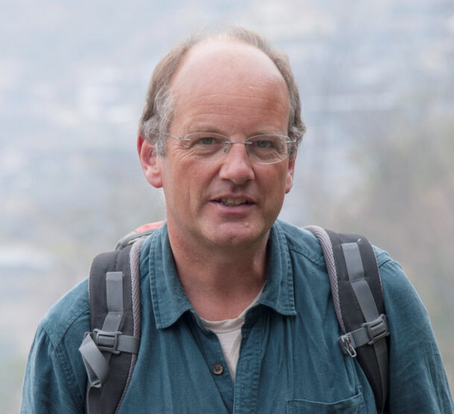
Johannes Müller on an ethnoarchaeological campaign in Nagaland in 2018.

Johannes Müller (born 29 November 1960 in Wolfhagen) is a German prehistoric archaeologist. Currently, he is professor at Kiel University (since 2004). He has achieved a high international reputation in the field, as he has repeatedly initiated or played a major role in developing great research projects, such as the Priority Programme SPP 1400, the Excellence Initiative "Graduate School: Human Development in Landscapes", the Collaborative Research Centre CRC 1266 and the Cluster of Excellence ROOTS. Judging by the interdisciplinary character of these projects, the number of universities and research institutes from different countries involved and, above all, the budget provided by the German Research Foundation, these projects can be described as extraordinary in this research field.

Müller has supervised dozens of theses (diploma, master's, bachelor's, master's, doctorate, post-doctoral) and thus influenced an entire generation of archaeologists. He has published a number of scientific articles, is (co-)editor of numerous journals and volumes and has written several popular science articles or his own books. For his achievements in international collaborations, he was awarded the Medal of Honour of the Adam Miekiewic University of Poznań in 2019 and the Swedish Riksbankens Jubileumsfond in 2021.

In December 2025, Adam Mickiewicz University honoured Johannes Müller with an honorary doctorate in recognition of his scientific achievements and decades of close collaboration.

== Books (collection) ==
Müller, J., Kirleis, W., Taylor, N. 2024. Perspectives on Socio-environmental Transformations in Ancient Europe. Cham: Springer Nature.

Müller, J. 2023. Separation, hybridisation, and networks. Globular Amphora sedentary pastoralists ca. 3200-2700 BCE. Scales of Transformations 17. Leiden: Sidestone Press. ISBN 9789464270488

Müller, J. ed. 2022. Connectivity Matters! Social, Environmental and Cultural Connectivity in Past Societies. ROOTS studies 2. Leiden: Sidestone Press. ISBN 9789464270273

Müller, J., Ricci, A. 2020. Past Societies. Human Development in Landscapes. Leiden: Sidestone Press. ISBN 9789088909245

Müller, J., Hinz, M., Wunderlich, M. eds., 2019. Megaliths – Societies – Landscapes. Early monumentality and social differentiation in Neolithic Europe. Bonn: Verlag Rudolf Habelt GmbH. ISBN 978-3-7749-4213-4

Müller, J. Rassmann, K., Videiko, M. eds., Trypillia Mega-Sites and european prehistory: 4100-3400 BCE. London/New York: Routledge. ISBN 9780367889517

Müller, J. 2017. Großsteingräber, Grabenwerke, Langhügel: Frühe Monumentalbauten Mitteleuropas. Stuttgart, Konrad Theiss Verlag.
