= Bukowska Wola =

- Village
- Location within Poland
- Coordinates: 50°21′28″N 20°4′24″E
- Country: Poland
- Voivodeship: Lesser Poland
- County: Miechów
- Gmina: Miechów
- Population: 490

Bukowska Wola (Polish pronunciation: [buˈkɔfska ˈvɔla]) is a village in the administrative district of Gmina Miechów, within Miechów County, Lesser Poland Voivodeship, in southern Poland.
