= Uśmierz =

- Village
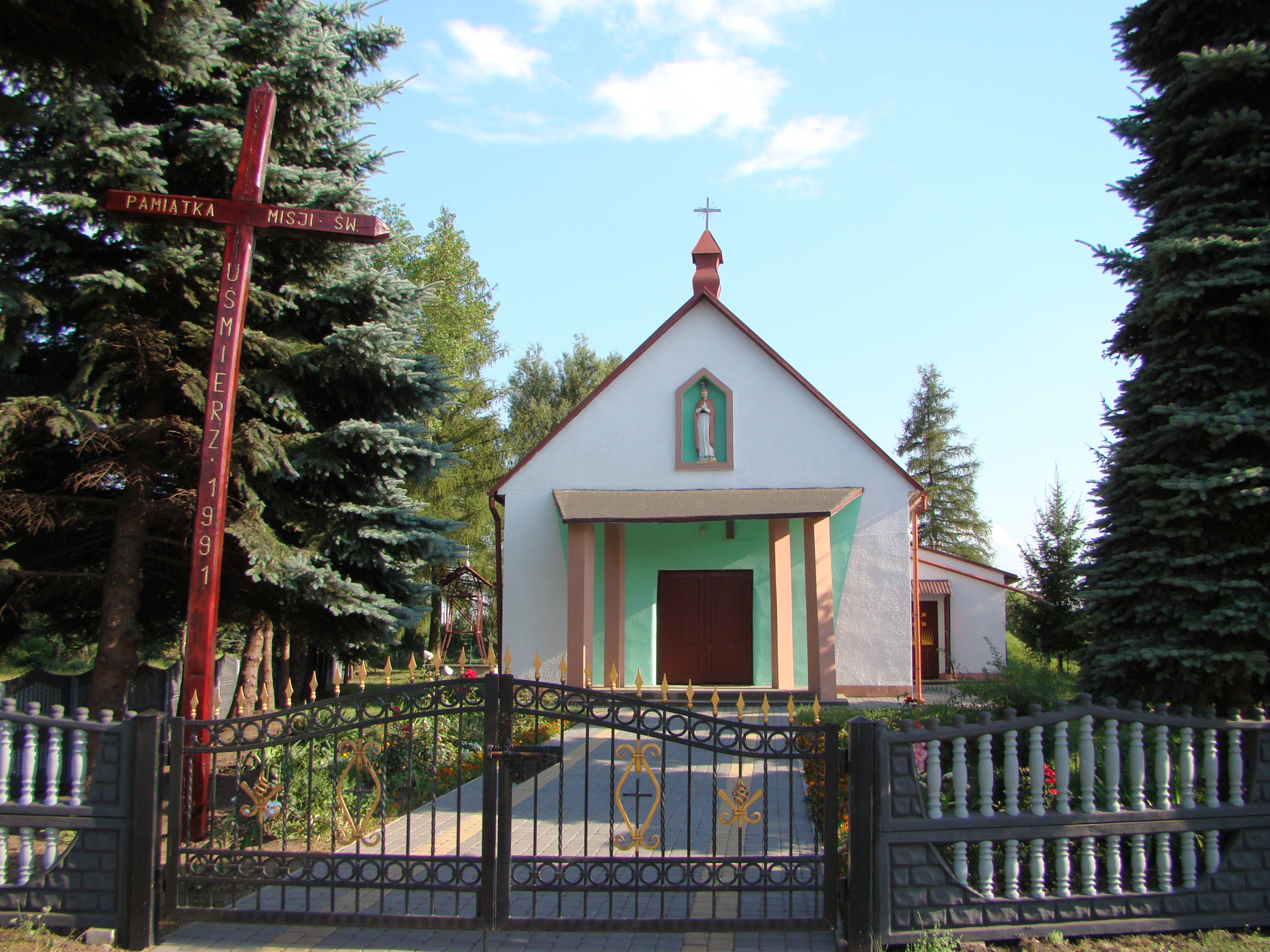
- Church in Uśmierz

- Location within Poland
- Coordinates: 50°32′18″N 24°3′52″E
- Country: Poland
- Voivodeship: Lublin
- County: Hrubieszów
- Gmina: Dołhobyczów
- Population: 30

Uśmierz [ˈuɕmjɛʂ] is a village in the administrative district of Gmina Dołhobyczów, within Hrubieszów County, Lublin Voivodeship, in eastern Poland, close to the border with Ukraine.
