= Horoszczyce =

- Village
- Location within Poland
- Coordinates: 50°33′48″N 23°59′57″E
- Country: Poland
- Voivodeship: Lublin
- County: Hrubieszów
- Gmina: Dołhobyczów
- Population: 120

Horoszczyce [xɔrɔʂˈt͡ʂɨt͡sɛ] is a village in the administrative district of Gmina Dołhobyczów, within Hrubieszów County, Lublin Voivodeship, in eastern Poland, close to the border with Ukraine.
