= Kadłubiska =

Kadłubiska may refer to the following places:

- Kadłubiska, Hrubieszów County in Lublin Voivodeship (east Poland)
- Kadłubiska, Zamość County in Lublin Voivodeship (east Poland)
- Kadłubiska, Subcarpathian Voivodeship (south-east Poland)
- Luchkivtsi in Brodivskyi Raion, Lviv Oblast, in western Ukraine, was formerly known as Kadłubiska.
