= Sulimów, Lublin Voivodeship =

Sulimów
- Village
- Location within Poland
- Coordinates: 50°31′9″N 24°1′39″E
- Country: Poland
- Voivodeship: Lublin
- County: Hrubieszów
- Gmina: Dołhobyczów
- Population: 40

Sulimów [suˈlimuf] is a village in the administrative district of Gmina Dołhobyczów, within Hrubieszów County, Lublin Voivodeship, in eastern Poland, close to the border with Ukraine. The village is located in the historical region Galicia.
