= Zagroble, Hrubieszów County =

Zagroble
- Settlement
- Location within Poland
- Coordinates: 50°49′1″N 23°48′8″E
- Country: Poland
- Voivodeship: Lublin
- County: Hrubieszów
- Gmina: Trzeszczany

Zagroble [zaˈɡrɔblɛ] is a settlement in the administrative district of Gmina Trzeszczany, within Hrubieszów County, Lublin Voivodeship, in eastern Poland.
