= Chochłów =

- Village
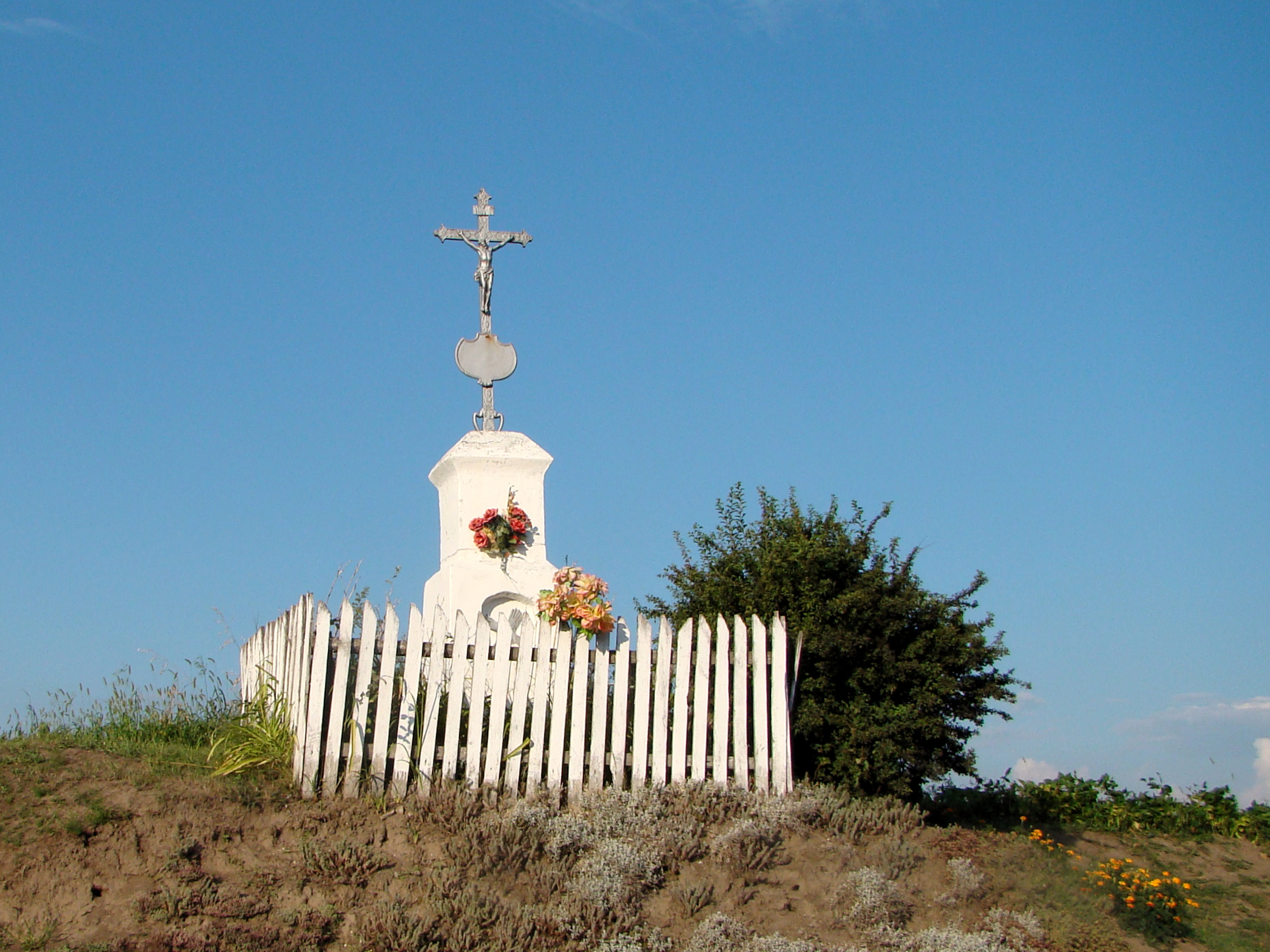
- Wayside cross in the village

- Location within Poland
- Coordinates: 50°29′30″N 24°1′17″E
- Country: Poland
- Voivodeship: Lublin
- County: Hrubieszów
- Gmina: Dołhobyczów
- Population: 40

Chochłów [ˈxɔxwuf] is a village in the administrative district of Gmina Dołhobyczów, within Hrubieszów County, Lublin Voivodeship, in eastern Poland, close to the border with Ukraine.
