= Dłużniów =

- Village
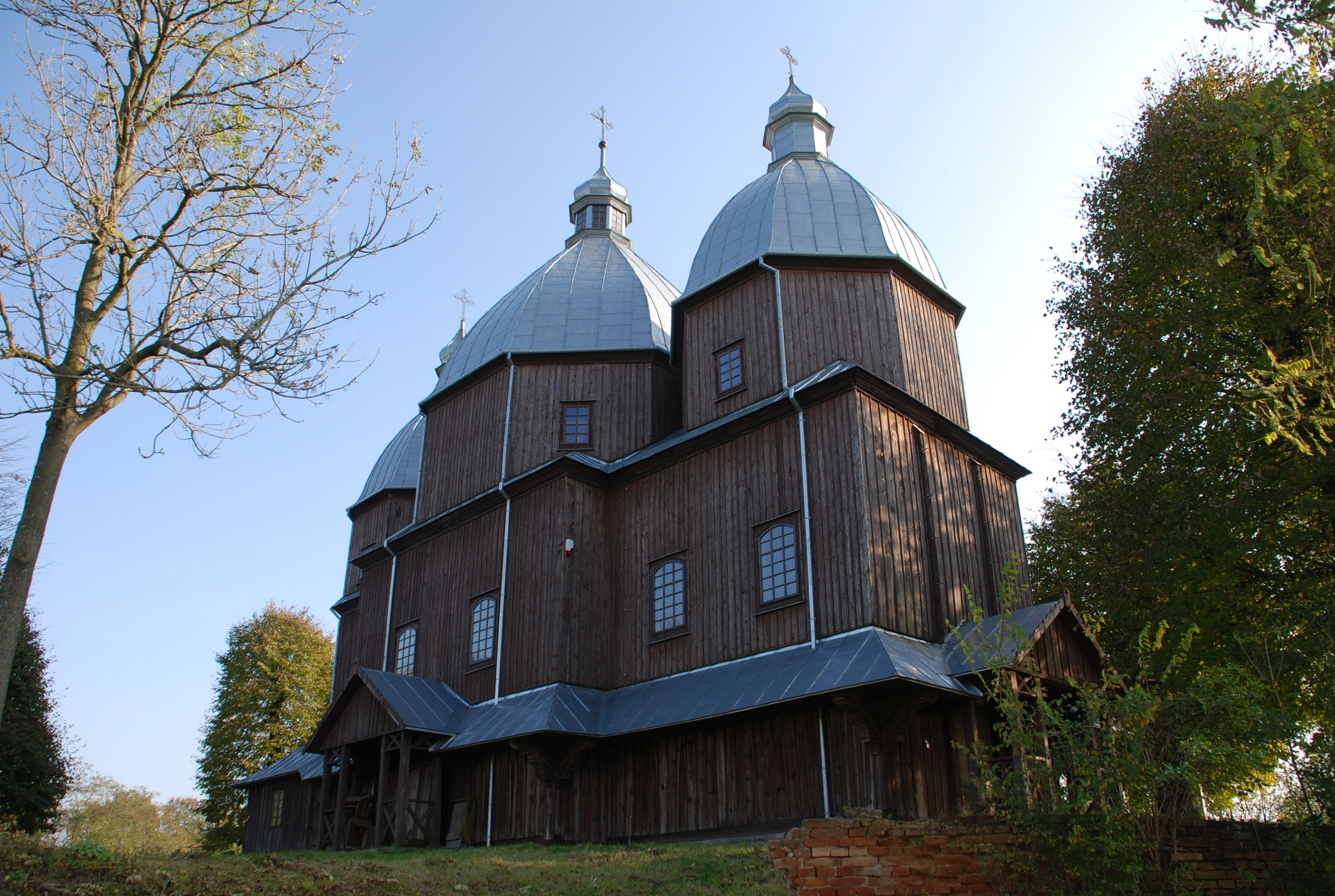
- Exaltation of the Holy Cross church

- Location within Poland
- Coordinates: 50°28′8″N 24°0′45″E
- Country: Poland
- Voivodeship: Lublin
- County: Hrubieszów
- Gmina: Dołhobyczów
- Population: 40

Dłużniów ([ˈdwuʐɲuf]) is a village in the administrative district of Gmina Dołhobyczów, within Hrubieszów County, Lublin Voivodeship, in eastern Poland, close to the border with Ukraine.

== German occupation ==
Before the war, Maks Glazermann, a Jewish engineer from Lwów owned an estate in Dłużniów. During the German occupation, he was initially left to run the property. In the summer of 1941, Julek (Joel/Jakób) Brandt, a leader of the Zionist youth movement Betar from Chorzów arranged for several hundred members of the Betar youth movement in the Warsaw Ghetto to work on farms and estates in the area, including Glazermann's in Dłużniów. Among them was Hanka Tauber, a young woman from Warsaw. Her account of what went on in Dłużniów was recorded in the diary of Abraham Lewin. Tauber returned to Warsaw, but most of the Betar youth who remained were killed in the spring of 1942.

Sights in Dłużniów

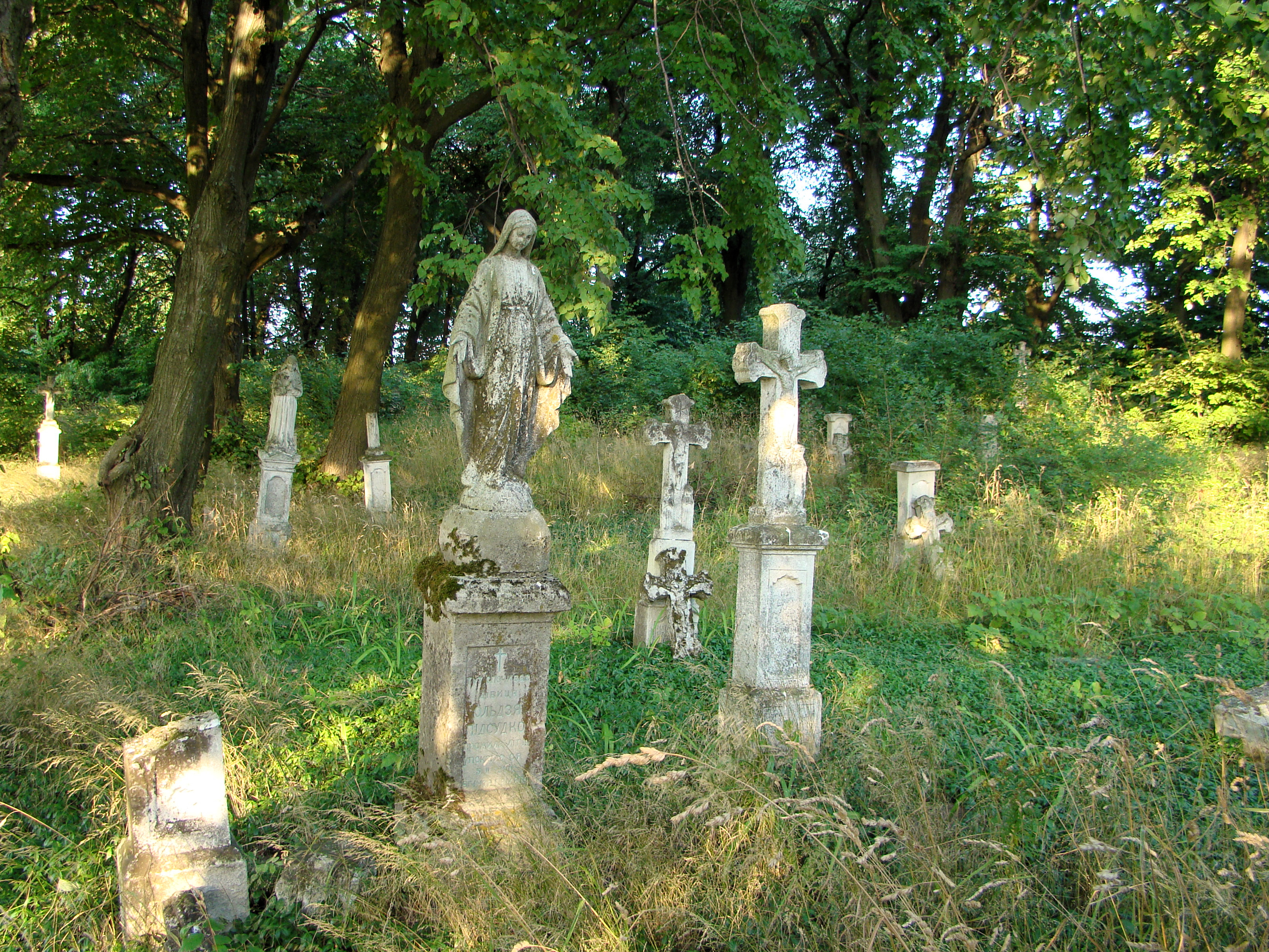
Cemetery

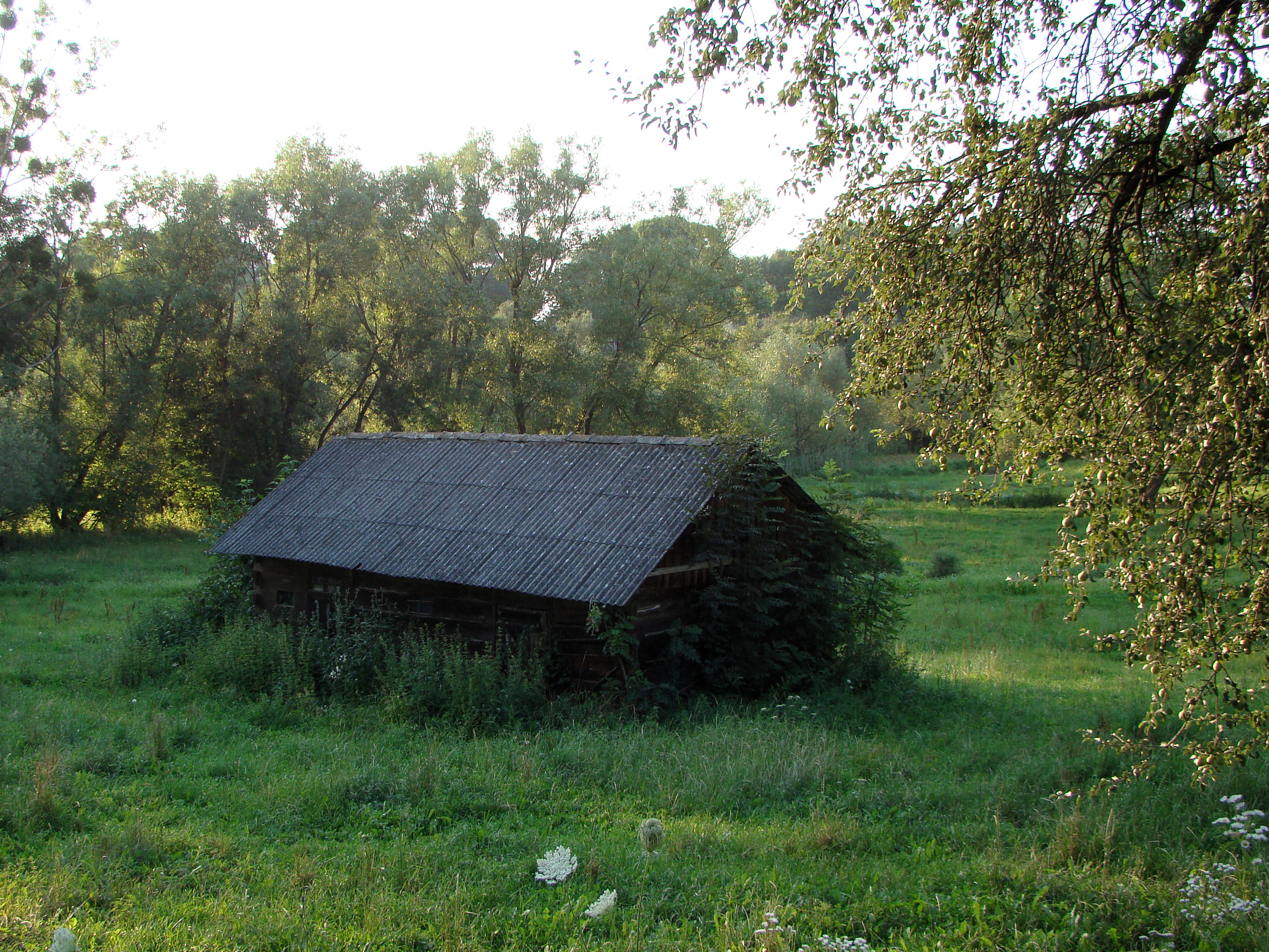
Old cottage

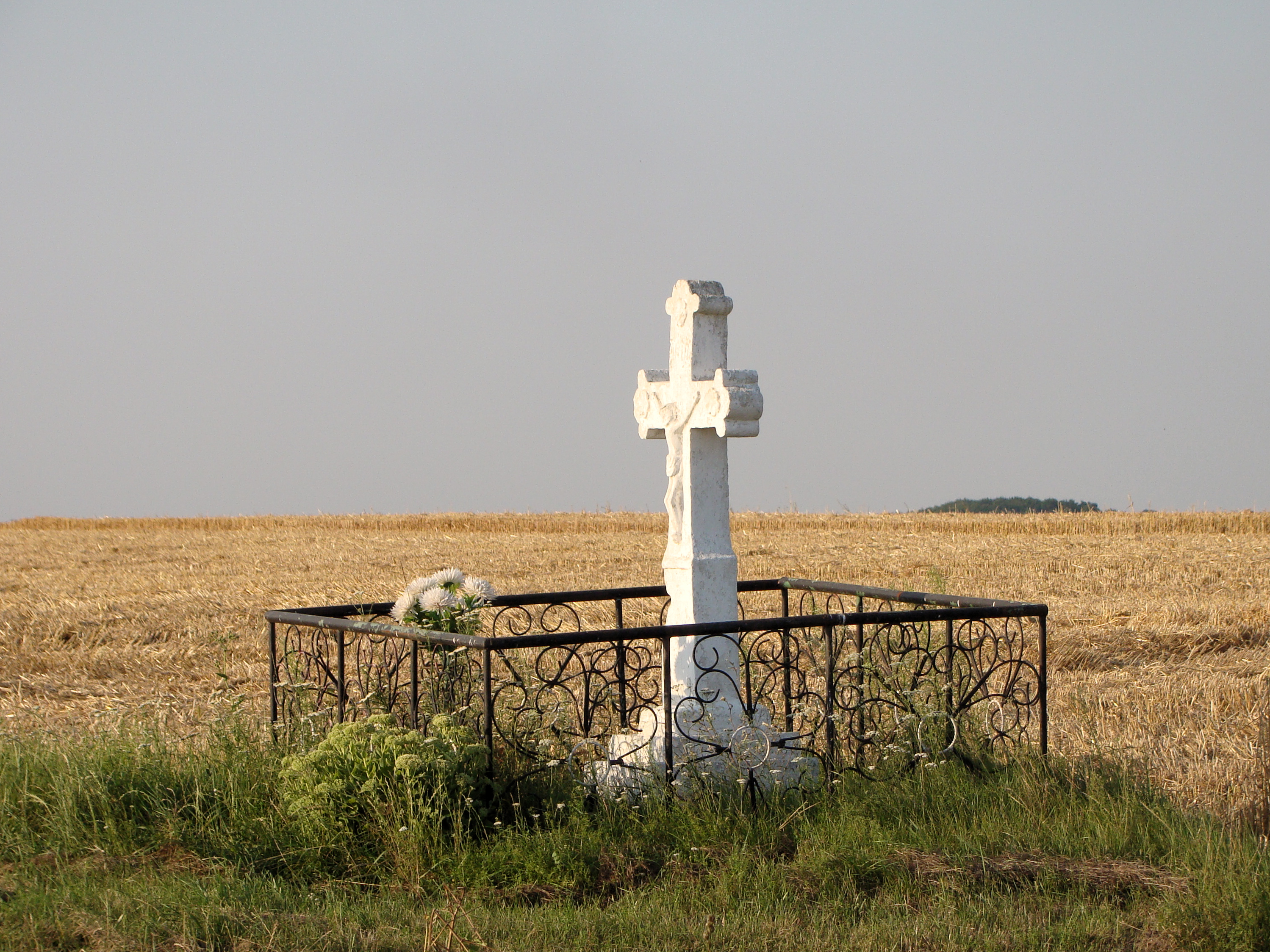
Wayside cross
