= Józefin, Hrubieszów County =

Józefin
- Village
- Location within Poland
- Coordinates: 50°49′N 23°40′E
- Country: Poland
- Voivodeship: Lublin
- County: Hrubieszów
- Gmina: Trzeszczany
- Time zone: UTC+1 (CET)
  - Summer (DST): UTC+2 (CEST)

Józefin [juˈzɛfin] is a village in the administrative district of Gmina Trzeszczany, within Hrubieszów County, Lublin Voivodeship, in eastern Poland.

== History ==
Three Polish citizens were murdered by Nazi Germany in the village during World War II.
