= Leopoldów, Hrubieszów County =

Leopoldów
- Village
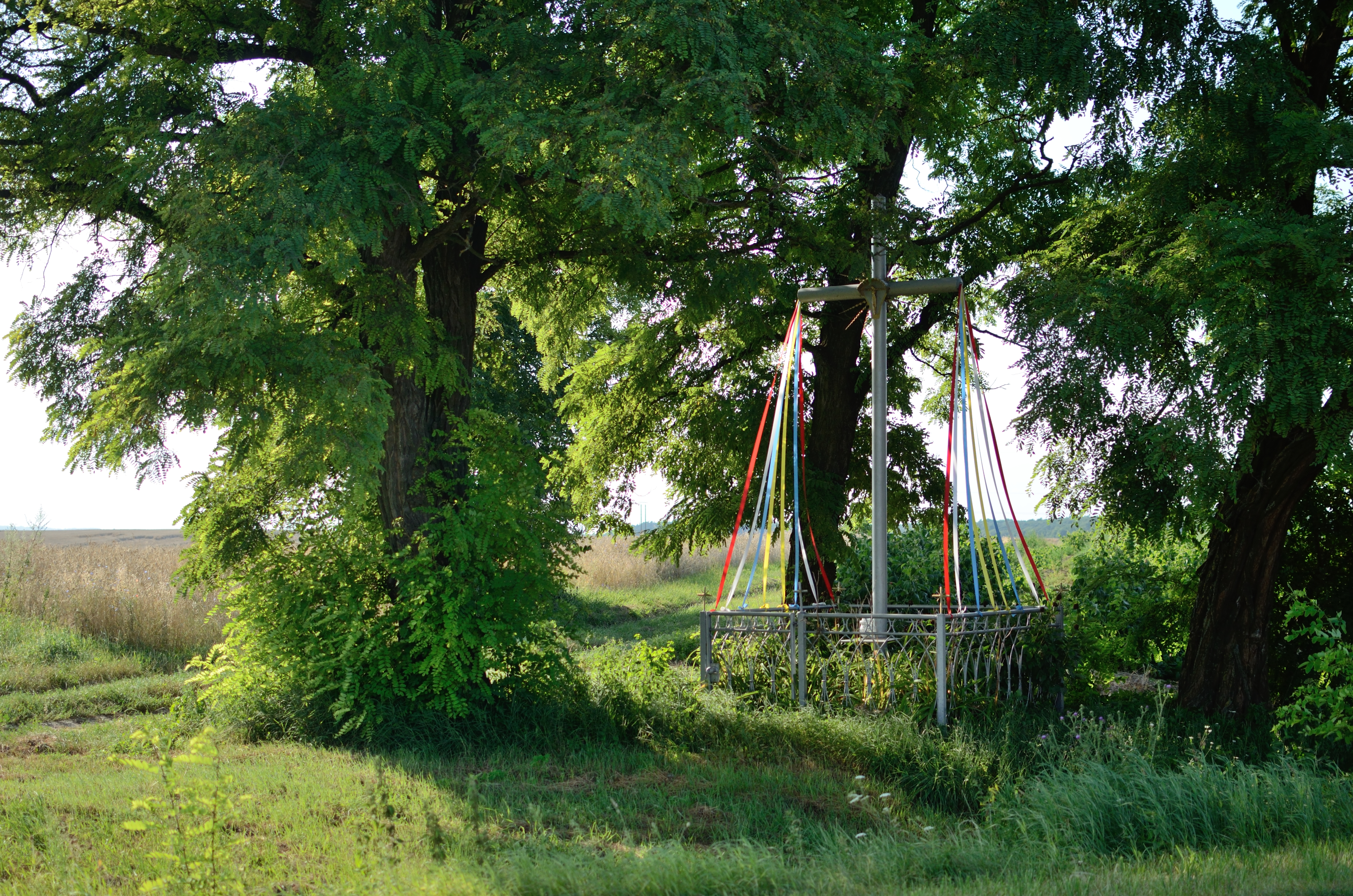

- Location within Poland
- Coordinates: 50°48′43″N 23°46′44″E
- Country: Poland
- Voivodeship: Lublin
- County: Hrubieszów
- Gmina: Trzeszczany
- Highest elevation: 300 m (980 ft)
- Lowest elevation: 150 m (490 ft)

Population
  - Total: 500
- Time zone: UTC+1 (CET)
  - Summer (DST): UTC+2 (CEST)

Leopoldów [lɛɔˈpɔlduf] is a village in the administrative district of Gmina Trzeszczany, within Hrubieszów County, Lublin Voivodeship, in eastern Poland.

== History ==
Five Polish citizens were murdered by Nazi Germany in the village during World War II.
