= Bogucice, Lublin Voivodeship =

Bogucice
- Village
- Location within Poland
- Coordinates: 50°47′46″N 23°43′48″E
- Country: Poland
- Voivodeship: Lublin
- County: Hrubieszów
- Gmina: Trzeszczany

Bogucice [bɔɡuˈt͡ɕit͡sɛ] is a village in the administrative district of Gmina Trzeszczany, within Hrubieszów County, Lublin Voivodeship, in eastern Poland.
