= Białystok (disambiguation) =

Białystok is a city in northeastern Poland.

Białystok or similar names may also refer to:

Administrative divisions around the Polish city

- Białystok County, current administrative division
- Białystok Voivodeship, an administrative district of Poland
  - Białystok Voivodeship (1919–1939), as defined before World War II
  - Białystok Voivodeship (1945–1975), as defined after World War II
  - Białystok Voivodeship (1975–1998), as defined after 1975
- Bezirk Bialystok, administrative division under the Nazis
- Białystok Department of the Kingdom of Prussia

Other

- Białystok, Lublin Voivodeship, a village in southeastern Poland
- Belostok, Tomsk Oblast, a village in Russia
- Max Bialystock, the character played by Zero Mostel in Mel Brooks' The Producers
- Bialystocks, a Japanese pop duo
- Ellen Bialystok, psychologist and academic
- Bialy (bread) a circular bread, named after the city
