= Witków, Lublin Voivodeship =

Witków
- Village
- Location within Poland
- Coordinates: 50°35′18″N 23°58′11″E
- Country: Poland
- Voivodeship: Lublin
- County: Hrubieszów
- Gmina: Dołhobyczów
- Population: 420

Witków [ˈvitkuf] is a village in the administrative district of Gmina Dołhobyczów, within Hrubieszów County, Lublin Voivodeship, in eastern Poland, close to the border with Ukraine. The village constitutes a sołectwo (administrative unit) within the Gmina Dołhobyczów. According to the National Census conducted in 2021, it had a population of 293, making it the fourth largest locality in the gmina.
