= Majdan Wielki, Hrubieszów County =

Majdan Wielki
- Village
- Location within Poland
- Coordinates: 50°50′N 23°40′E
- Country: Poland
- Voivodeship: Lublin
- County: Hrubieszów
- Gmina: Trzeszczany

Majdan Wielki (Polish pronunciation: [ˈmajdan ˈvjɛlkʲi]) is a village in the administrative district of Gmina Trzeszczany, within Hrubieszów County, Lublin Voivodeship, in eastern Poland.
