= Lipina, Lublin Voivodeship =

Lipina
- Village
- Location within Poland
- Coordinates: 50°28′8″N 23°54′18″E
- Country: Poland
- Voivodeship: Lublin
- County: Hrubieszów
- Gmina: Dołhobyczów
- Population: 150

Lipina [liˈpina] is a village in the administrative district of Gmina Dołhobyczów, within Hrubieszów County, Lublin Voivodeship, in eastern Poland, close to the border with Ukraine.
