= Hulcze =

- Village
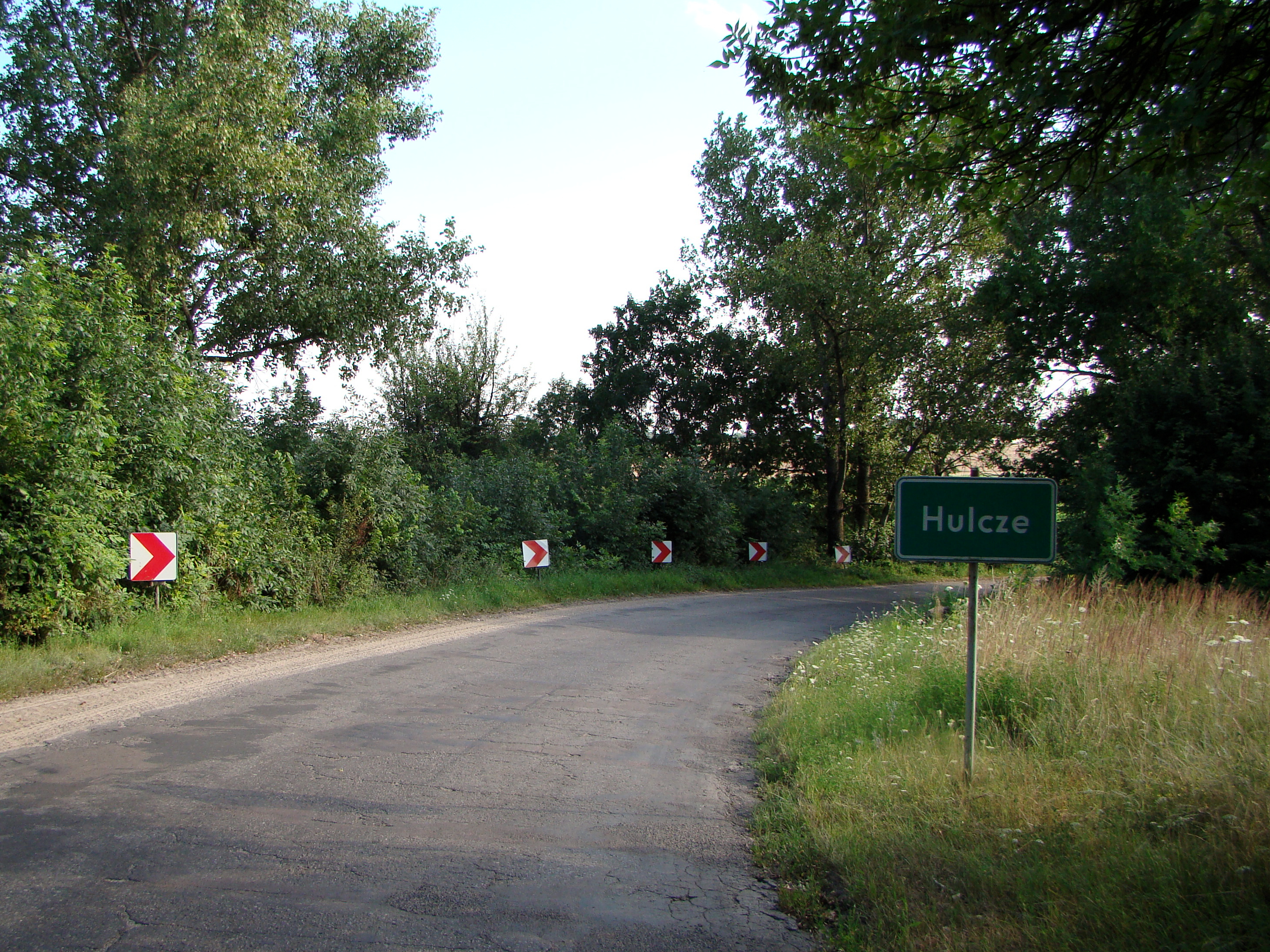
- Road to the village

- Location within Poland
- Coordinates: 50°29′53″N 24°0′44″E
- Country: Poland
- Voivodeship: Lublin
- County: Hrubieszów
- Gmina: Dołhobyczów
- Population: 40

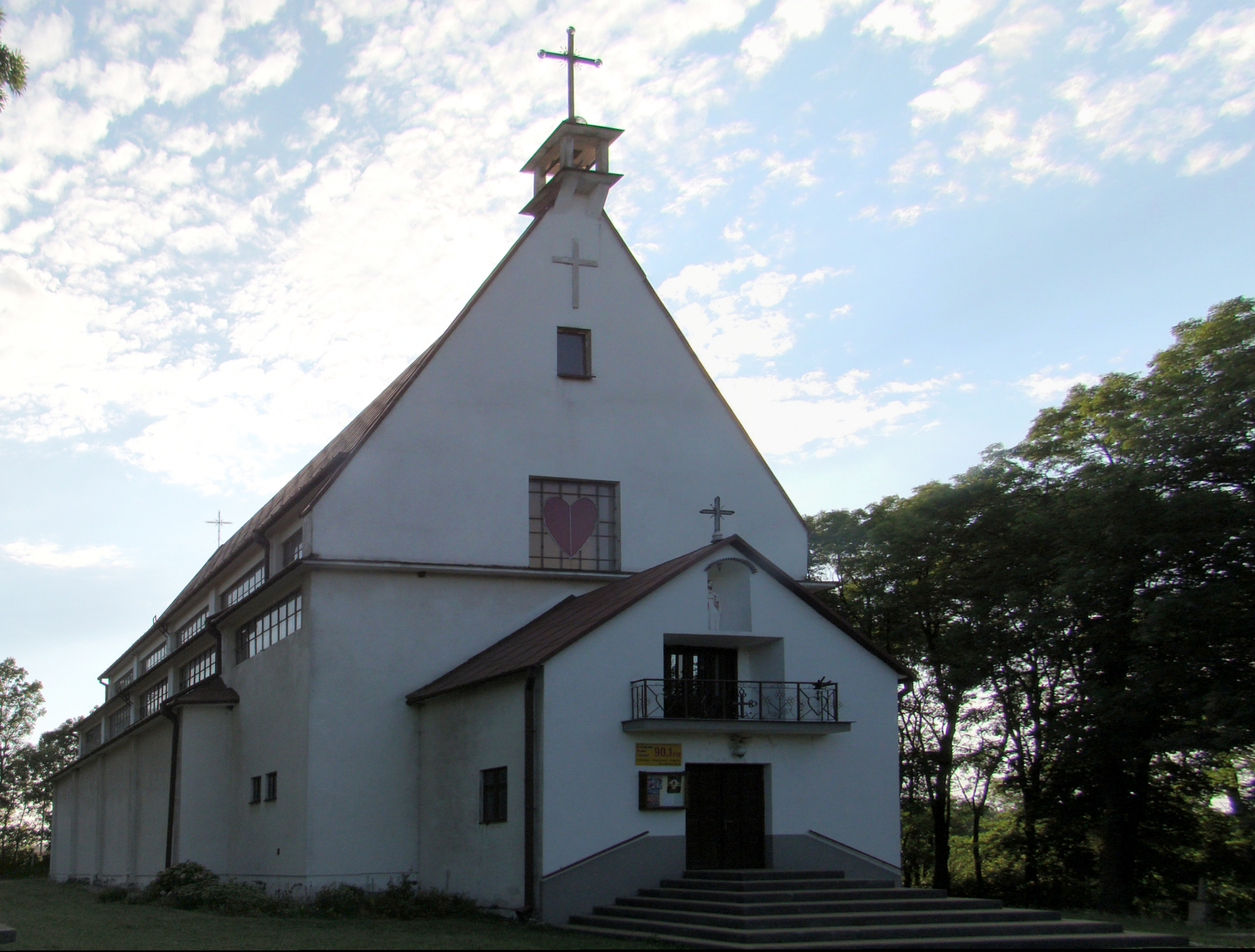
Sacred Heart church

Hulcze [ˈxult͡ʂɛ] is a village in the administrative district of Gmina Dołhobyczów, within Hrubieszów County, Lublin Voivodeship, in eastern Poland, close to the border with Ukraine.
