= Zadębce =

- Village
- Location within Poland
- Coordinates: 50°51′04″N 23°46′26″E
- Country: Poland
- Voivodeship: Lublin
- County: Hrubieszów
- Gmina: Trzeszczany

Zadębce [zaˈdɛmpt͡sɛ] is a village in the administrative district of Gmina Trzeszczany, within Hrubieszów County, Lublin Voivodeship, in eastern Poland.
