= Majdan, Hrubieszów County =

Majdan
- Village
- Location within Poland
- Coordinates: 50°27′52″N 23°57′53″E
- Country: Poland
- Voivodeship: Lublin
- County: Hrubieszów
- Gmina: Dołhobyczów
- Population: 150

Majdan (Polish pronunciation: [ˈmajdan]) is a village in the administrative district of Gmina Dołhobyczów, within Hrubieszów County, Lublin Voivodeship, in eastern Poland, close to the border with Ukraine.
