= Liski, Gmina Dołhobyczów =

Liski
- Village
- Location within Poland
- Coordinates: 50°30′20″N 23°57′9″E
- Country: Poland
- Voivodeship: Lublin
- County: Hrubieszów
- Gmina: Dołhobyczów
- Population: 60

Liski [ˈliski] is a village in the administrative district of Gmina Dołhobyczów, within Hrubieszów County, Lublin Voivodeship, in eastern Poland, close to the border with Ukraine. The village is located in the historical region of Sokal, Galicia. The Szelemej family was autochthonous to the village for centuries, with a direct most recent dynastic lineage of Hryc, Roman, Ivan, Dmytro, Hryhory, Ihor, and Paul (Pavlush) Szelemej, who now resides in Winnipeg, Canada.

Over the centuries, the village changed hands not infrequently. Sometime between 1805 and 1810, the lord of the village, named Kryzhanivsky, had a distillery built on the other side of the road. They first had to build a brickyard near the stream below the church, taking the clay for brickmaking from the Prysilka tract. This to some extent improved the financial situation of the peasants, only because the feculent refuse of the distillery served to fatten the cattle and pigs. In addition, Kryzhanivsky gave alcohol for the work, so as to intoxicate the peasants to suppress any risk of rebellion. The Muscovites would routinely exchange it for sugar (the story of the grandmother Maria Synytsa). Behind the distillery stood the lord's cowsheds and stables.

Water was taken to the plant from the source of the pond by birch water pipes (during the cleaning of the pond in 1935, up to 30 m of such pipes were dug).

In the First World War, all of the manor houses burned down. No one rebuilt them because Kryzhanivsky gave his daughter in marriage to Potvorovsky, who lived in the village of Hulcze. In 1920, having become a senator, he moved to Warsaw with his family.

For the whole of Galicia, and therefore also for the peasants of the village, the year 1848 was extremely memorable with the proclamation of the abolition of serfdom. On this occasion, an iron cross was installed and 4 linden trees were planted. This cross still stands on the left side of the stairs leading to the church.

In 1846, before the abolition of serfdom, Kryzhanivsky had a chapel built at the entrance to the village between the roads from Hulcze and Kościaszyn, with a wooden figure of St. Florian placed before the entrance to the village from Przewodów. There was also built an iron cross, the crucifix of Jesus Christ, which in the village was called a figurine. They stand to this day.

At the time, there was an old parish church in the village, and a cemetery around it. The parishioners were faced with the acute question of building a new church. Under the leadership of three unknown villagers (their names were erased from an inscription on the back wall of the new church), the parishioners of the villages of Liski, Przewodów, and Kościaszyn were to construct the new church in Liski for the parish comprising those three villages. The construction of the parish cathedral began in 1872 and was completed in 1875.
