= Gołębie =

Gołębie may refer to the following places:

- Gołębie, Lublin Voivodeship (east Poland)
- Gołębie, Masovian Voivodeship (east-central Poland)
- Gołębie, Podlaskie Voivodeship (north-east Poland)
