= Mołczany =

- Village
- Location within Poland
- Coordinates: 50°36′4″N 24°1′37″E
- Country: Poland
- Voivodeship: Lublin
- County: Hrubieszów
- Gmina: Dołhobyczów
- Population: 120

Mołczany [mɔu̯ˈt͡ʂanɨ] is a village in the administrative district of Gmina Dołhobyczów, within Hrubieszów County, Lublin Voivodeship, in eastern Poland, close to the border with Ukraine.
