= Ostrówek, Hrubieszów County =

Ostrówek
- Village
- Location within Poland
- Coordinates: 50°48′14″N 23°39′50″E
- Country: Poland
- Voivodeship: Lublin
- County: Hrubieszów
- Gmina: Trzeszczany
- Population: 270

Ostrówek [ɔsˈtruvɛk] is a village in the administrative district of Gmina Trzeszczany, within Hrubieszów County, Lublin Voivodeship, in eastern Poland. It is about 20 km (12 mi) west of Hrubieszow.
