= Myców =

- Village
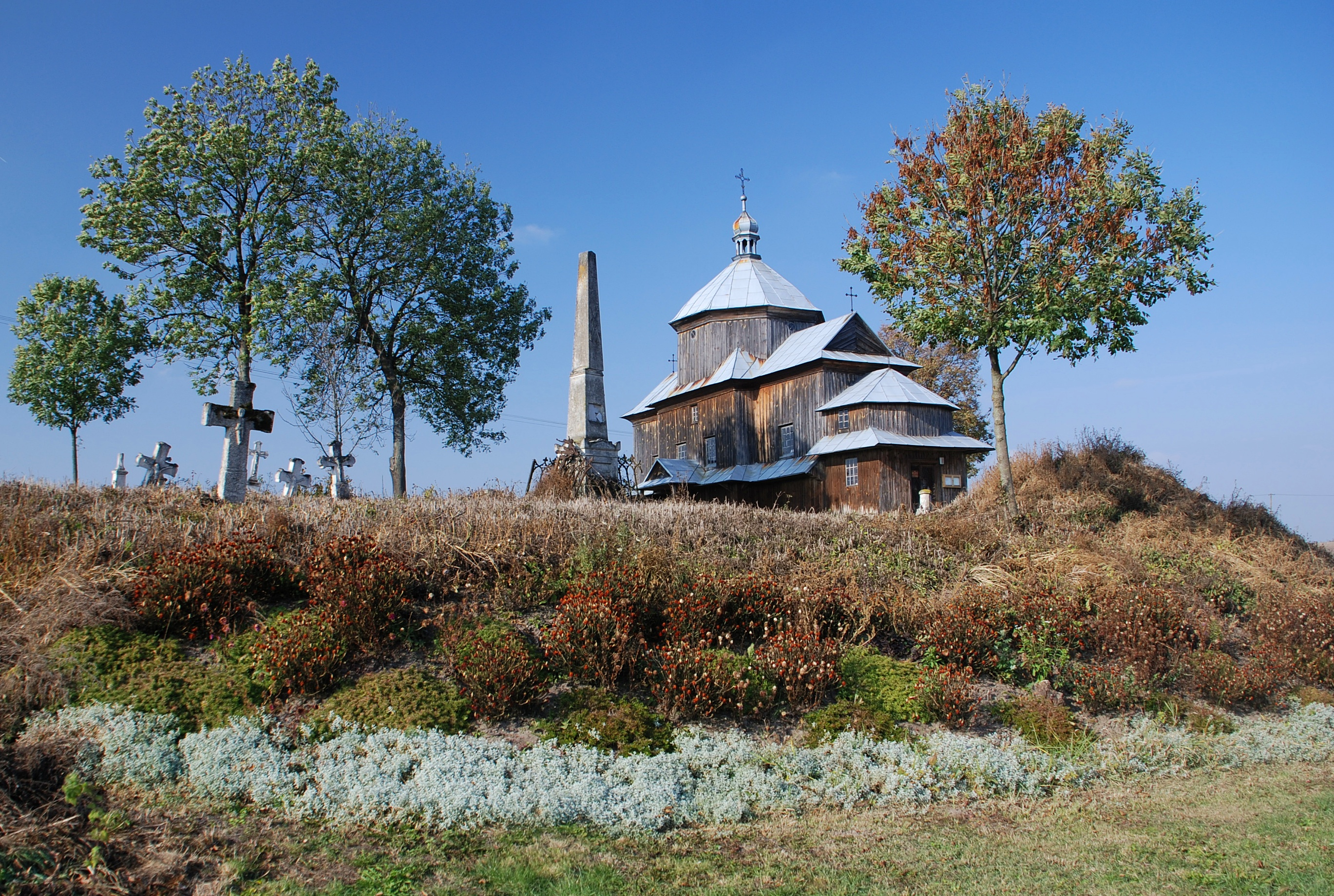
- St Nicholas’ Church in Myców

- Location within Poland
- Coordinates: 50°26′N 23°59′E
- Country: Poland
- Voivodeship: Lublin
- County: Hrubieszów
- Gmina: Dołhobyczów
- Population: 140

Myców [ˈmɨt͡suf] is a village in the administrative district of Gmina Dołhobyczów, within Hrubieszów County, Lublin Voivodeship, in eastern Poland, close to the border with Ukraine.
