= Nieledew =

- Village
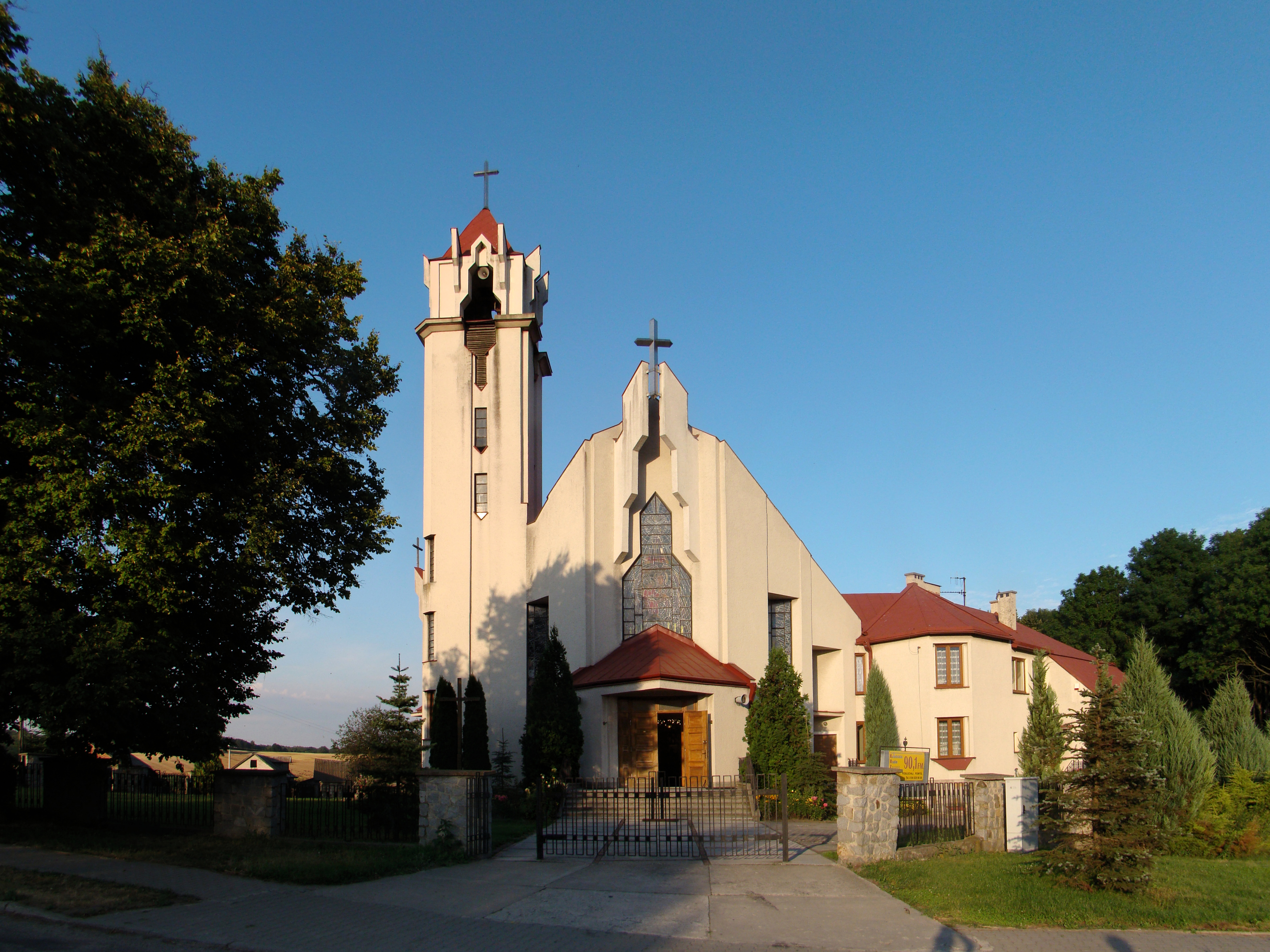
- Our Lady of Częstochowa church in Nieledew

- Location within Poland
- Coordinates: 50°49′47″N 23°47′20″E
- Country: Poland
- Voivodeship: Lublin
- County: Hrubieszów
- Gmina: Trzeszczany

Population
  - Total: 1,700
- Time zone: UTC+1 (CET)
  - Summer (DST): UTC+2 (CEST)
- Vehicle registration: LHR

Nieledew [ɲɛˈlɛdɛf] is a village in the administrative district of Gmina Trzeszczany, within Hrubieszów County, Lublin Voivodeship, in eastern Poland.

== History ==
In 1899, a sugar factory was established in Nieledew.

During World War II, on 26 May 1944, the Ukrainian Insurgent Army (UPA) attacked the village. The UPA robbed and burned Polish houses, and massacred either 18 or 23 Polish inhabitants. Three of the victims were shot and the others were burned alive.
