= Dołhobyczów =

- Village
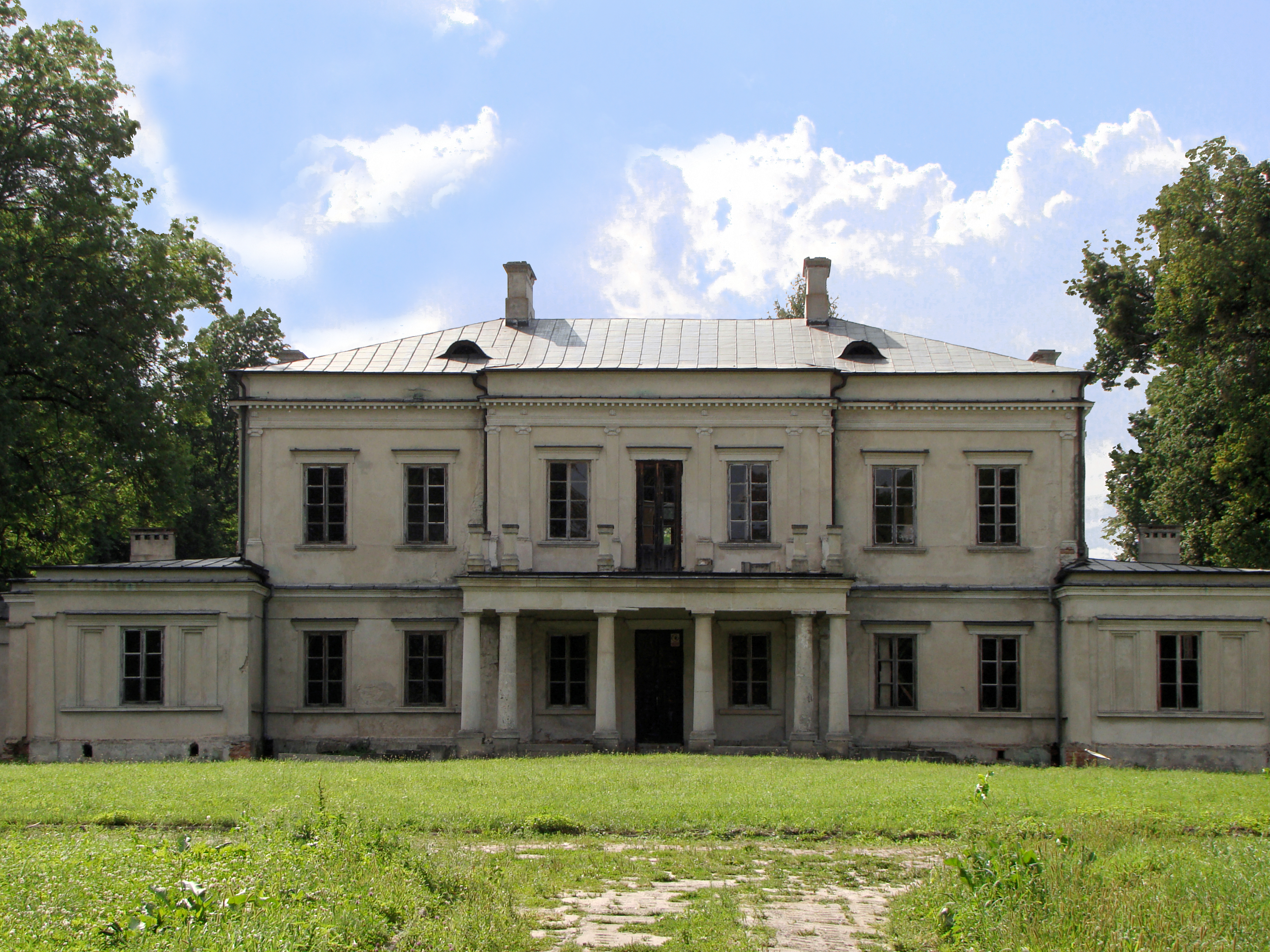
- Rastawiecki Palace in Dołhobyczów
- Interactive map of Dołhobyczów
- Location within Poland
- Coordinates: 50°35′12″N 24°2′1″E
- Country: Poland
- Voivodeship: Lublin
- County: Hrubieszów
- Gmina: Dołhobyczów

Population
  - Total: 1,720
- Time zone: UTC+1 (CET)
  - Summer (DST): UTC+2 (CEST)
- Postal code: 22-540
- Vehicle registration: LHR

Dołhobyczów (Polish pronunciation: [dɔwxɔˈbɨt͡ʂuf]; Ukrainian: Довгобичів) is a village in Hrubieszów County, Lublin Voivodeship, in eastern Poland, close to the border with Ukraine. It is the seat of the gmina (administrative district) called Gmina Dołhobyczów.

During the January Uprising, a clash between Polish insurgents and Russian troops took place in Dołhobyczów on 3 January 1864.

Road border crossing between Poland and Ukraine was opened temporarily in nearby village Dołhobyczów-Kolonia during Euro 2012 and on 24 June 2014 the permanent crossing was completed. Since 2015 the crossing is available for cars, coaches, trucks under 3.5 tonnes of mass, bikes and pedestrians.
