= Horodyszcze, Hrubieszów County =

Horodyszcze
- Village
- Location within Poland
- Coordinates: 50°30′40″N 24°3′15″E
- Country: Poland
- Voivodeship: Lublin
- County: Hrubieszów
- Gmina: Dołhobyczów
- Population: 40

Horodyszcze [xɔrɔˈdɨʂt͡ʂɛ] is a village in the administrative district of Gmina Dołhobyczów, within Hrubieszów County, Lublin Voivodeship, in eastern Poland, close to the border with Ukraine.
