= Żabcze =

- Village
- Location within Poland
- Coordinates: 50°32′32″N 24°0′28″E
- Country: Poland
- Voivodeship: Lublin
- County: Hrubieszów
- Gmina: Dołhobyczów
- Population: 40

Żabcze (Note: Polish pronunciation: [ˈʐapt͡ʂɛ]) is a village in the administrative district of Gmina Dołhobyczów, within Hrubieszów County, Lublin Voivodeship, in eastern Poland, close to the border with Ukraine.

== Demography ==
According to the 2011 National Census of Population and Housing, the population of Żabcze village is 224, of which 51.8% are women and 48.2% are men. The town is inhabited by 3.8% of the commune's inhabitants. In the years 1998-2011 the number of inhabitants decreased by 27.0%. 57.1% of the inhabitants of the village of Żabcze are in the working age, 17.9% in the pre-working age, and 25.0% of the inhabitants are in the post-working age.
