= Zaręka =

- Village
- Location within Poland
- Coordinates: 50°37′14″N 24°04′47″E
- Country: Poland
- Voivodeship: Lublin
- County: Hrubieszów
- Gmina: Dołhobyczów
- Population: 70

Zaręka [zaˈrɛŋka] is a village in the administrative district of Gmina Dołhobyczów, within Hrubieszów County, Lublin Voivodeship, in eastern Poland, close to the border with Ukraine.
