= Zadębce-Kolonia =

- Village
- Location within Poland
- Coordinates: 50°51′32″N 23°45′57″E
- Country: Poland
- Voivodeship: Lublin
- County: Hrubieszów
- Gmina: Trzeszczany

Zadębce-Kolonia [zaˈdɛmpt͡sɛ kɔˈlɔɲa] is a village in the administrative district of Gmina Trzeszczany, within Hrubieszów County, Lublin Voivodeship, in eastern Poland.
