= Wólka Poturzyńska =

- Village
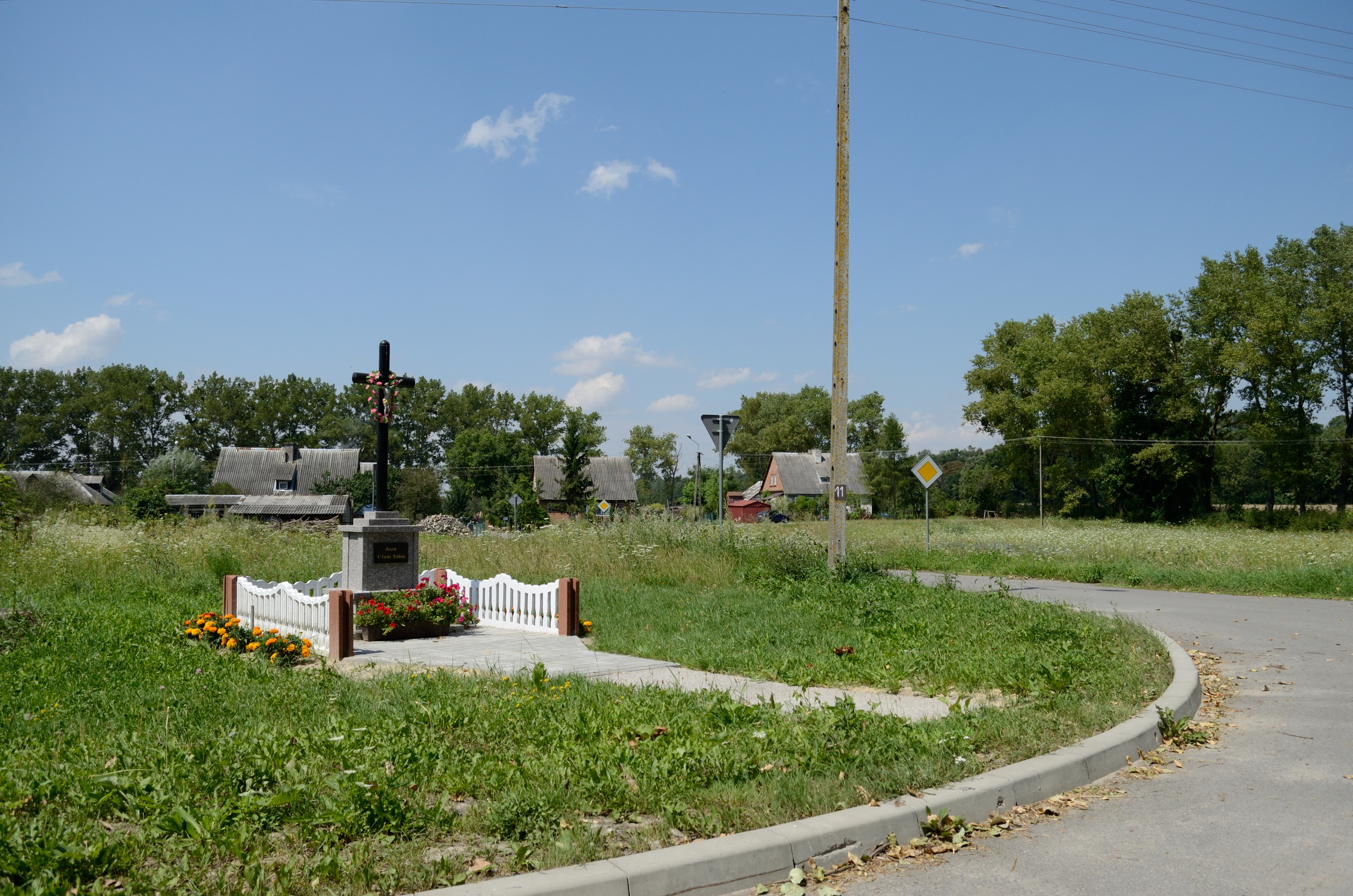
- Wayside cross in Wólka Poturzyńska

- Location within Poland
- Coordinates: 50°37′14″N 23°59′47″E
- Country: Poland
- Voivodeship: Lublin
- County: Hrubieszów
- Gmina: Dołhobyczów
- Population: 20
- Time zone: UTC+1 (CET)
  - Summer (DST): UTC+2 (CEST)
- Vehicle registration: LHR

Wólka Poturzyńska [ˈvulka pɔtuˈʐɨɲska] is a village in the administrative district of Gmina Dołhobyczów, within Hrubieszów County, Lublin Voivodeship, in south-eastern Poland, close to the border with Ukraine.
