= Zaborce =

- Village
- Location within Poland
- Coordinates: 50°47′N 23°40′E
- Country: Poland
- Voivodeship: Lublin
- County: Hrubieszów
- Gmina: Trzeszczany

Zaborce [zaˈbɔrt͡sɛ] is a village in the administrative district of Gmina Trzeszczany, within Hrubieszów County, Lublin Voivodeship, in eastern Poland.
