= Oszczów =

- Village
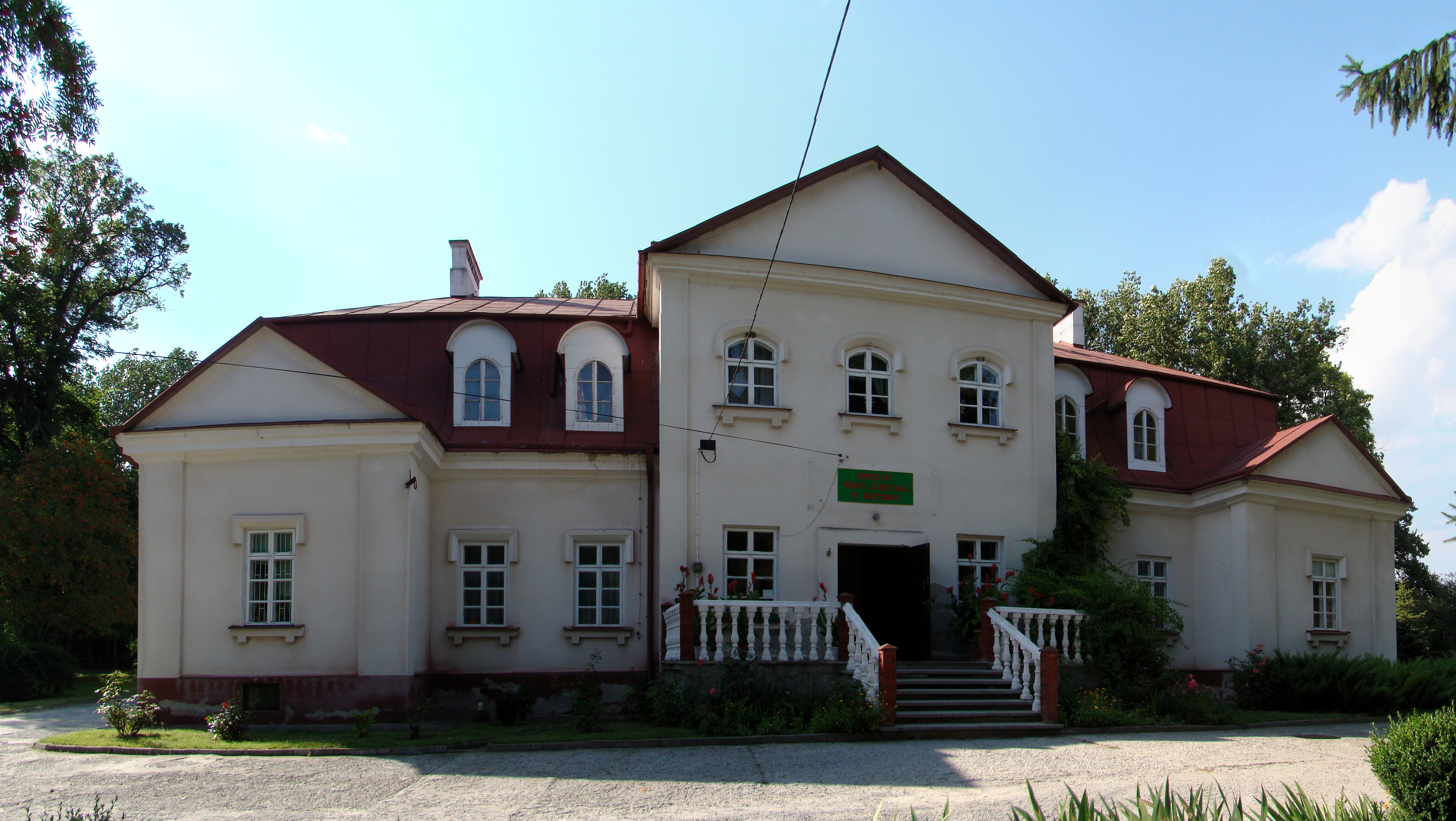
- Manor house in Oszczów

- Location within Poland
- Coordinates: 50°33′21″N 24°2′47″E
- Country: Poland
- Voivodeship: Lublin
- County: Hrubieszów
- Gmina: Dołhobyczów
- Population: 40

Oszczów [ˈɔʂt͡ʂuf] is a village in the administrative district of Gmina Dołhobyczów, within Hrubieszów County, Lublin Voivodeship, in eastern Poland, close to the border with Ukraine.

Sights in Oszczów

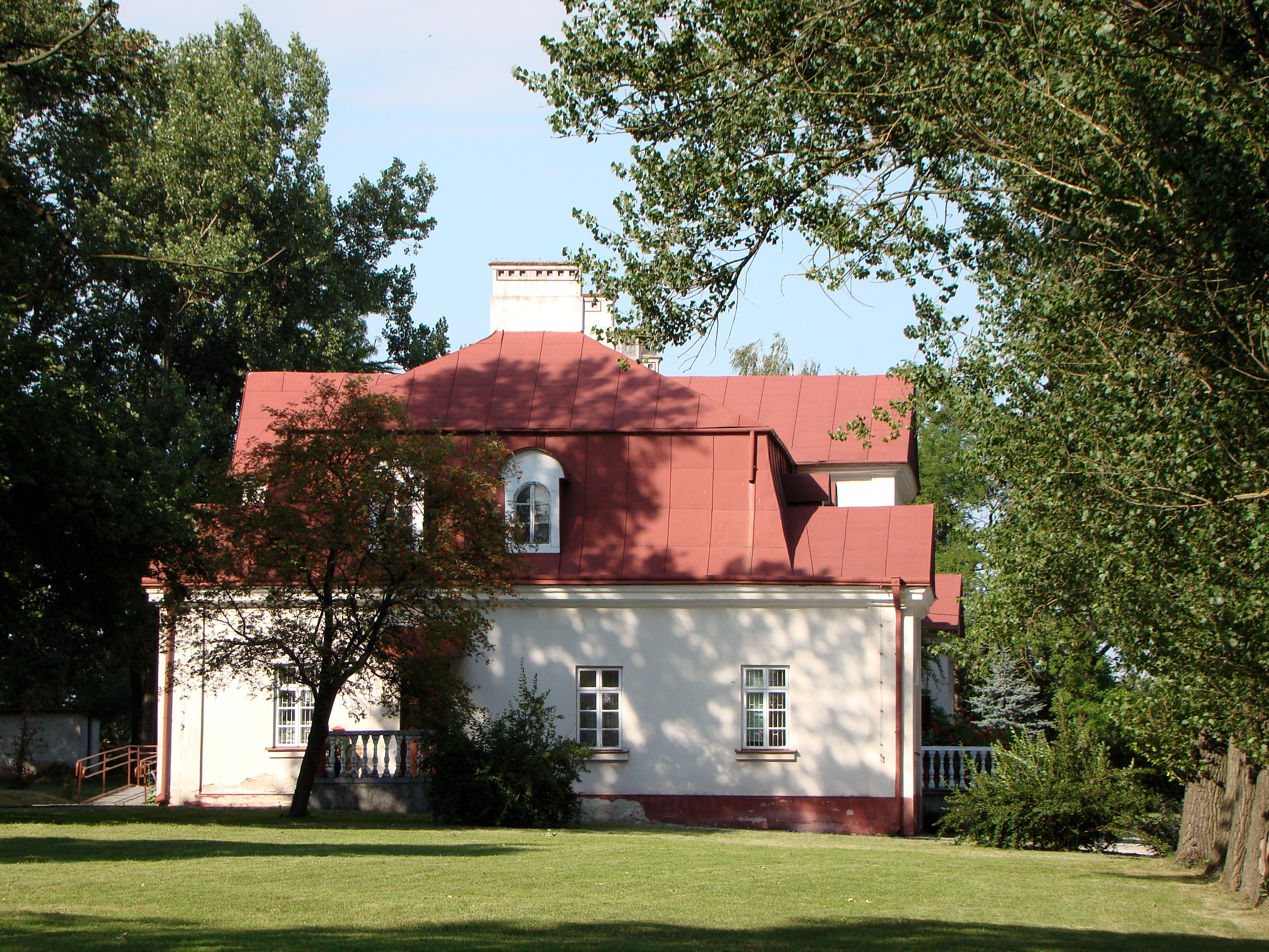
Manor house in Oszczów

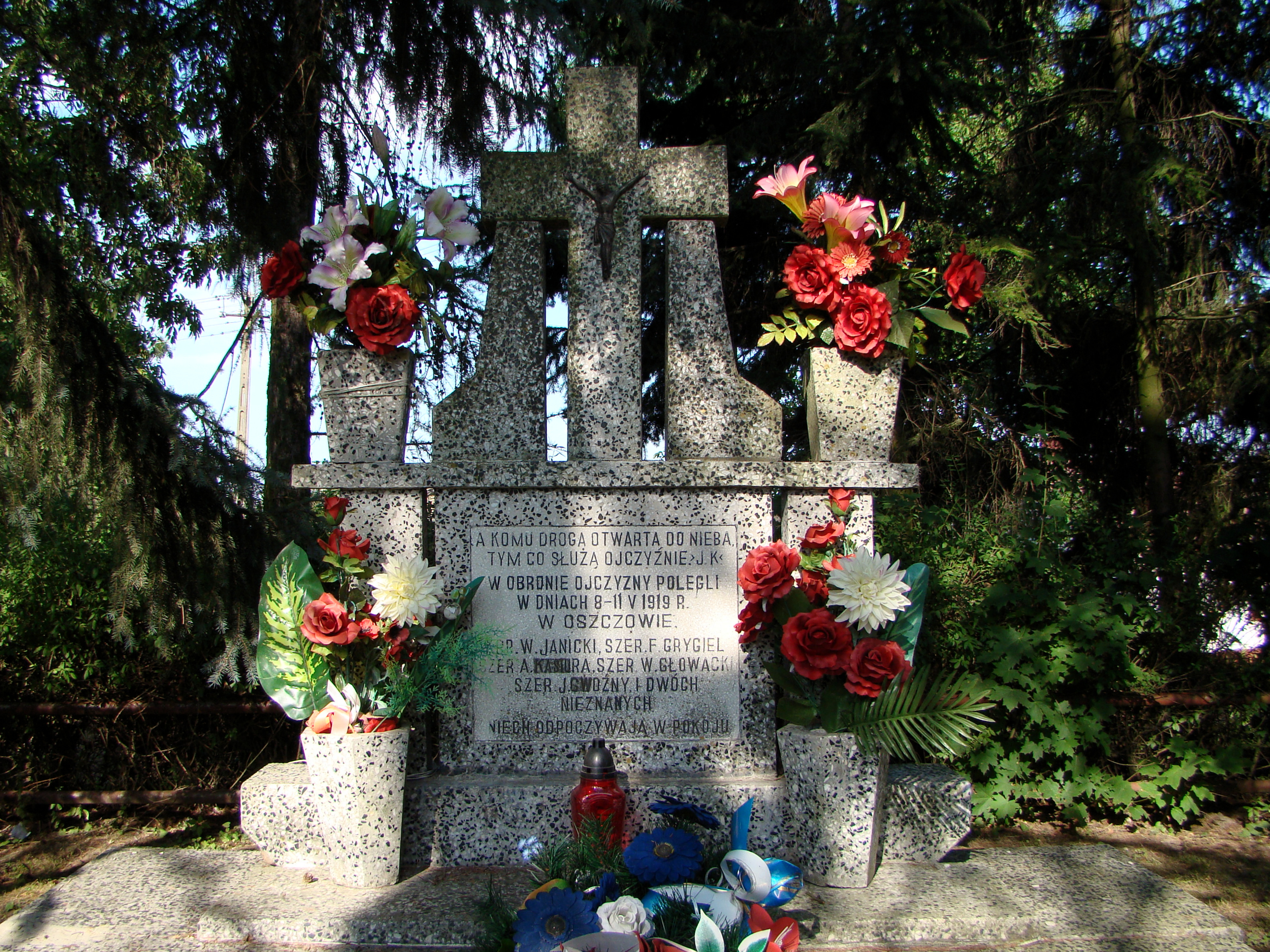
Memorial of soldiers fighting for the country and died in 1919

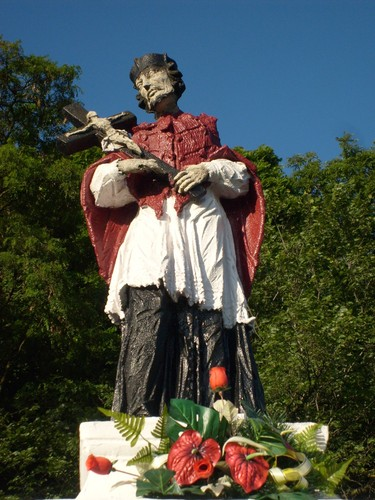
Monument of St. John of Nepomuk on the crossroad

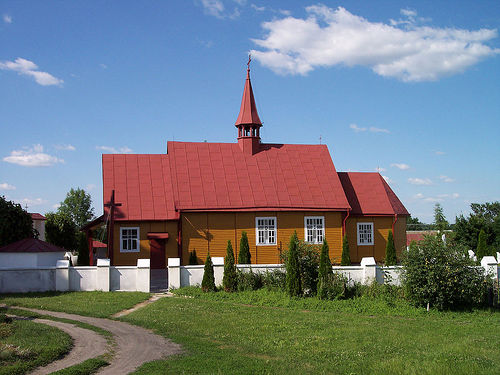
Parish church
