= Mołodiatycze =

- Village
- Location within Poland
- Coordinates: 50°49′N 23°42′E
- Country: Poland
- Voivodeship: Lublin
- County: Hrubieszów
- Gmina: Trzeszczany
- Time zone: UTC+1 (CET)
  - Summer (DST): UTC+2 (CEST)
- Vehicle registration: LHR

Mołodiatycze [mɔwɔdjaˈtɨt͡ʂɛ] is a village in the administrative district of Gmina Trzeszczany, within Hrubieszów County, Lublin Voivodeship, in eastern Poland.

== History ==
During World War II, a local Polish policeman was murdered by the Russians in the Katyn massacre in 1940.
