= Podhajczyki =

- Village
- Location within Poland
- Coordinates: 50°36′8″N 23°59′41″E
- Country: Poland
- Voivodeship: Lublin
- County: Hrubieszów
- Gmina: Dołhobyczów
- Population: 40

Podhajczyki [pɔtxai̯ˈt͡ʂɨki] is a village in the administrative district of Gmina Dołhobyczów, within Hrubieszów County, Lublin Voivodeship, in eastern Poland, close to the border with Ukraine.
