= Białystok, Lublin Voivodeship =

Białystok
- Village
- Location within Poland
- Coordinates: 50°29′34″N 23°56′24″E
- Country: Poland
- Voivodeship: Lublin
- County: Hrubieszów
- Gmina: Dołhobyczów
- Population: 95

Białystok (Polish pronunciation: [bjaˈwɨstɔk]) is a village in the administrative district of Gmina Dołhobyczów, within Hrubieszów County, Lublin Voivodeship, in eastern Poland, close to the border with Ukraine.
