= Gmina Trzeszczany =

Gmina Trzeszczany Trzeszczany Commune
- Gmina
- Location within Poland
- Coordinates (Trzeszczany): 50°49′15″N 23°44′18″E
- Country: Poland
- Voivodeship: Lublin
- County: Hrubieszów
- Seat: Trzeszczany

Area
  - Total: 90.17 km^{2} (34.81 sq mi)

Population (2013)
  - Total: 4,548
  - Density: 50.44/km^{2} (130.6/sq mi)
- Website: http://www.trzeszczany.pl

Gmina Trzeszczany is a rural gmina (administrative district) in Hrubieszów County, Lublin Voivodeship, in eastern Poland. Its seat is the village of Trzeszczany, which lies approximately 11 kilometres (7 mi) west of Hrubieszów and 95 km (59 mi) south-east of the regional capital Lublin.

The gmina covers an area of 90.17 square kilometres (34.8 sq mi), and as of 2006 its total population is 4,641 (4,548 in 2013).

== Villages ==
Gmina Trzeszczany contains the villages and settlements of Bogucice, Drogojówka, Józefin, Korytyna, Leopoldów, Majdan Wielki, Mołodiatycze, Nieledew, Ostrówek, Trzeszczany, Zaborce, Zadębce, Zadębce-Kolonia, Zagroble and Zamłynie.

== Neighbouring gminas ==
Gmina Trzeszczany is bordered by the gminas of Grabowiec, Hrubieszów, Miączyn, Uchanie and Werbkowice.
