= Trzeszczany =

- Village
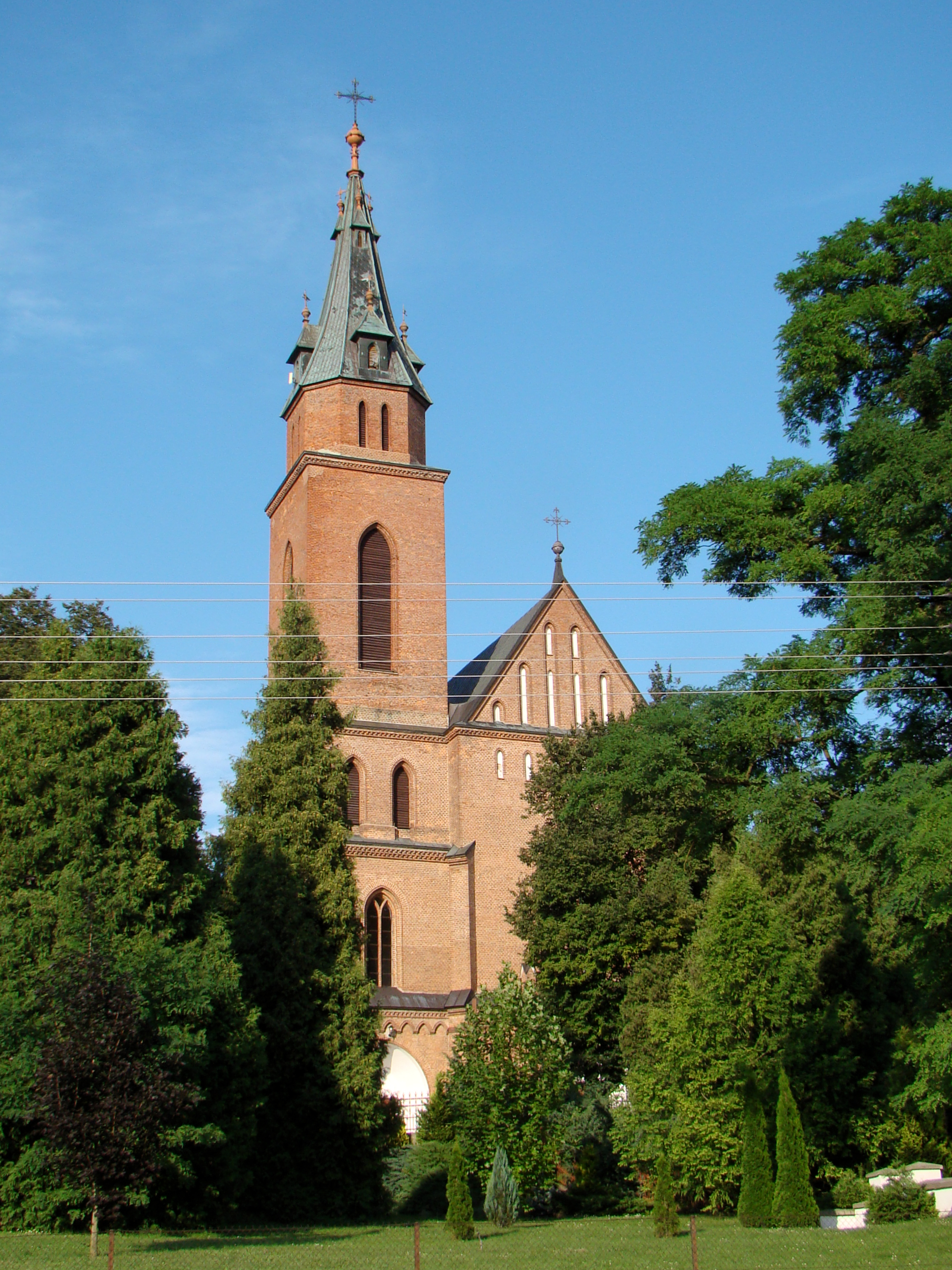
- Church of the Holy Trinity and Nativity of the Virgin Mary

- Location within Poland
- Coordinates: 50°49′15″N 23°44′18″E
- Country: Poland
- Voivodeship: Lublin
- County: Hrubieszów
- Gmina: Trzeszczany

Population
  - Total: 655
- Website: http://www.trzeszczany.pl

Trzeszczany [tʂɛʂˈt͡ʂanɨ] is a village in Hrubieszów County, Lublin Voivodeship, in eastern Poland. It is the seat of the gmina (administrative district) called Gmina Trzeszczany.

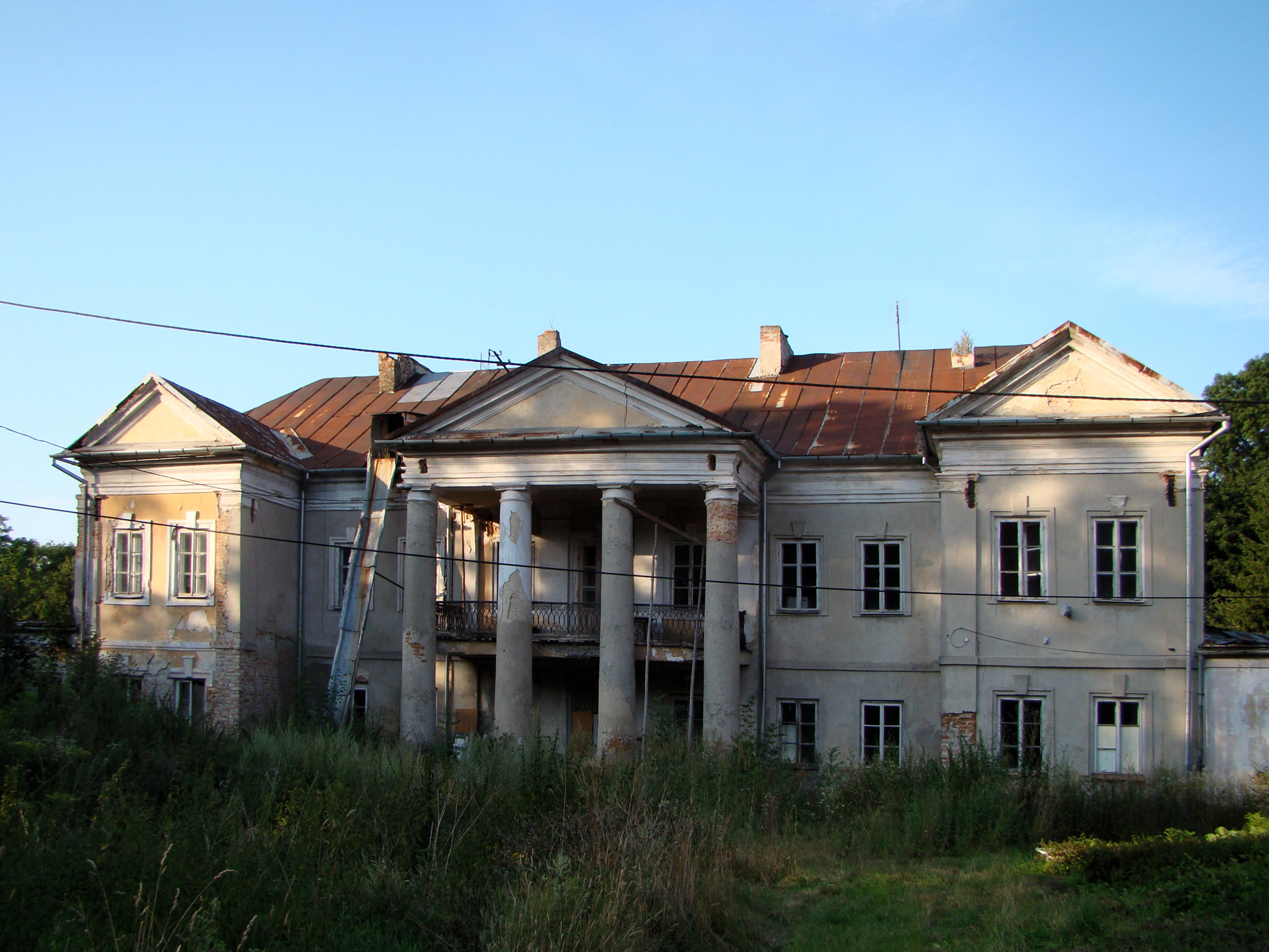
Bielski Palace in Trzeszczany
