= Gmina Dołhobyczów =

Gmina Dołhobyczów Dołhobyczów Commune
- Gmina
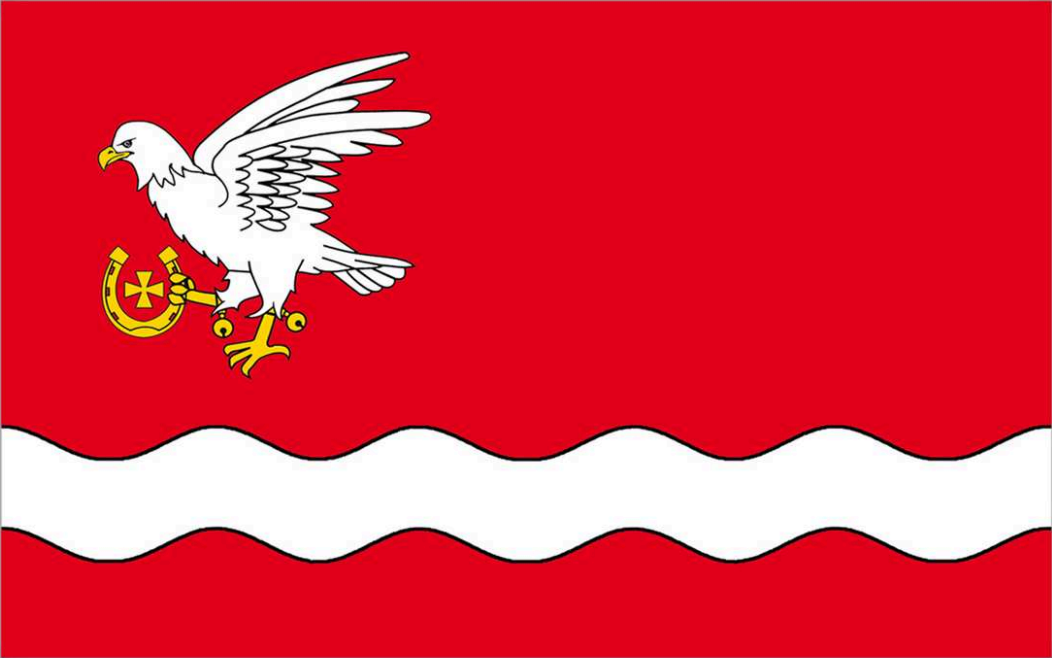
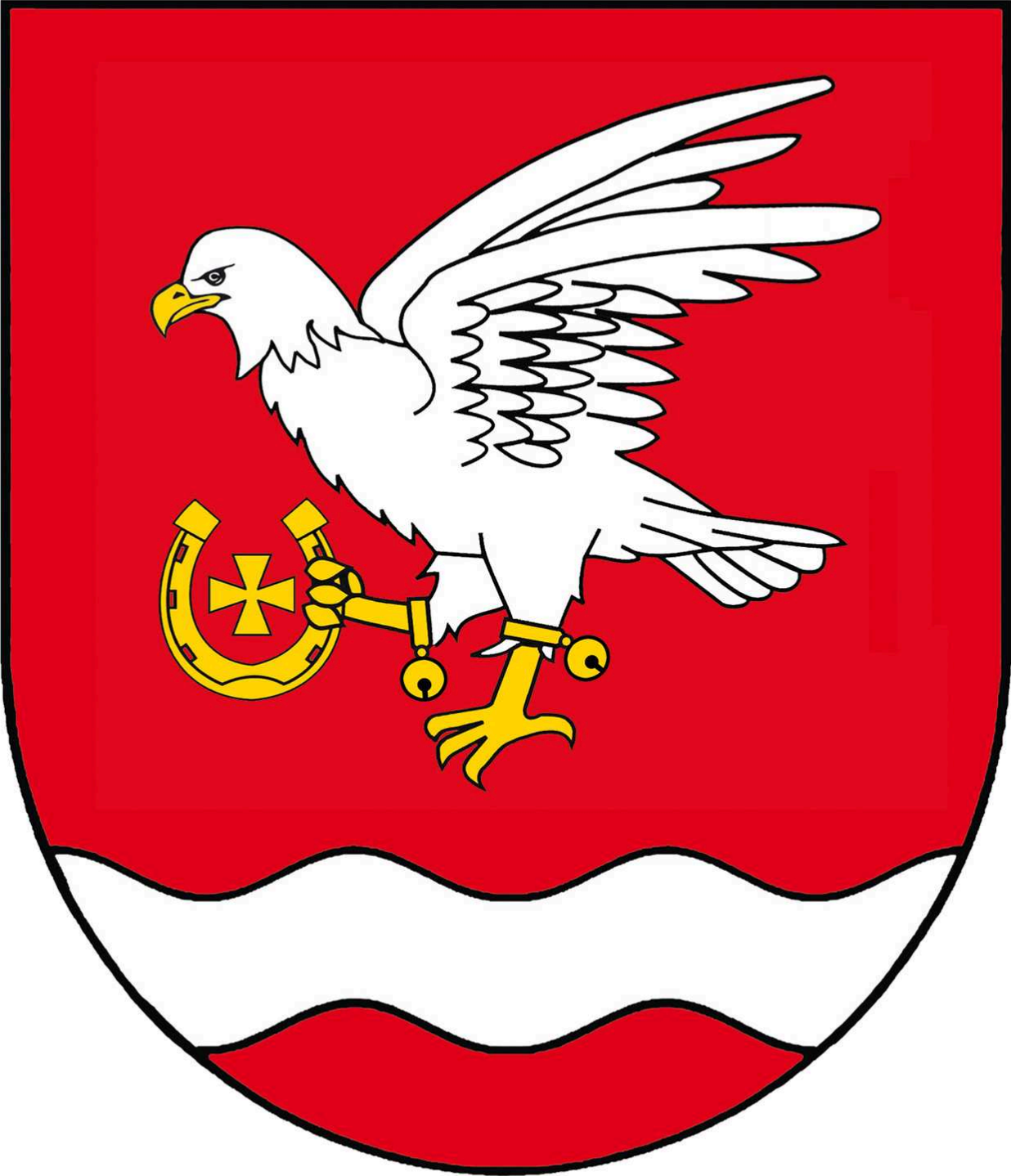
- Flag Coat of arms

- Location within Poland
- Coordinates (Dołhobyczów): 50°35′12″N 24°2′1″E
- Country: Poland
- Voivodeship: Lublin
- County: Hrubieszów
- Seat: Dołhobyczów

Area
  - Total: 214.19 km^{2} (82.70 sq mi)

Population (2013)
  - Total: 5,848
  - Density: 27.30/km^{2} (70.71/sq mi)
- Website: http://www.dolhobyczow.pl

Gmina Dołhobyczów is a rural gmina (administrative district) in Hrubieszów County, Lublin Voivodeship, in eastern Poland, on the border with Ukraine. Its seat is the village of Dołhobyczów, which lies approximately 28 kilometres (17 mi) south-east of Hrubieszów and 127 km (79 mi) south-east of the regional capital Lublin.

The gmina covers an area of 214.19 square kilometres (82.7 sq mi), and as of 2006 its total population is 6,100 (5,848 in 2013).

== Villages ==
Gmina Dołhobyczów contains the villages and settlements of Białystok, Chłopiatyn, Chochłów, Dłużniów, Dołhobyczów, Dołhobyczów-Kolonia, Gołębie, Honiatyn, Horodyszcze, Horoszczyce, Hulcze, Kadłubiska, Kościaszyn, Lipina, Liski, Liwcze, Majdan, Mołczany, Myców, Oszczów, Oszczów-Kolonia, Podhajczyki, Przewodów, Setniki, Siekierzyńce, Sulimów, Sulimów-Kolonia, Uśmierz, Witków, Wólka Poturzyńska, Wyżłów, Zaadamie, Żabcze, Zaręka and Żniatyn.

== Neighbouring gminas ==
Gmina Dołhobyczów is bordered by the gminas of Mircze, Telatyn and Ulhówek. It also borders Ukraine.
