= Wiszniów =

Polish village

- Village
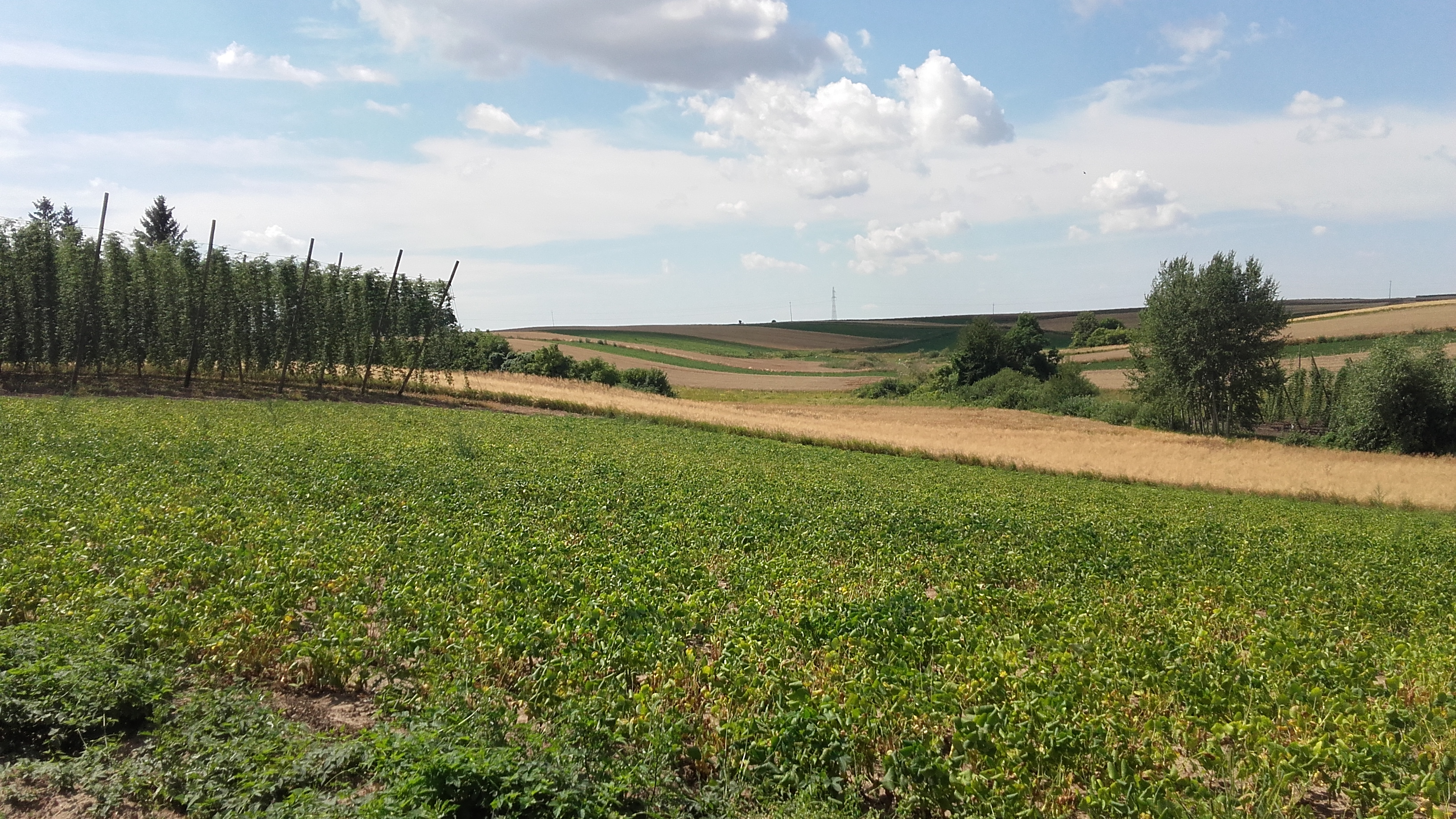
- Countryside in Wiszniów

- Location within Poland
- Coordinates: 50°35′N 23°54′E
- Country: Poland
- Voivodeship: Lublin
- County: Hrubieszów
- Gmina: Mircze
- First mentioned: 1396
- Population: 584
- Time zone: UTC+1 (CET)
  - Summer (DST): UTC+2 (CEST)
- Postal code: 22-530
- Vehicle registration: LHR

Wiszniów [ˈviʂɲuf] is a village in the administrative district of Gmina Mircze, within Hrubieszów County, Lublin Voivodeship, in eastern Poland, close to the border with Ukraine.

== Geography ==
Wiszniów is located on the south-eastern edge of the Mircze commune, on the Bukowa River on the border of the Kotlina Hrubieszowska and Grzęda Sokalska. The village is mainly of agricultural and fruit production owing to its suitable conditions. There are both farm buildings and a housing estate. The water reservoir is located in Korczunek (Karczunek), and there are several artificial reservoirs for breeding ponds. In the north of the village there is a mixed forest.

== Demography ==
In 2011, the population was 584, making Wiszniów the second largest village in the Mircze commune. Half of the community is women and half are men. From 1998 to 2011, the number of inhabitants decreased by 1.5%. 60.3% of the inhabitants of the village of Wiszniów are of working age, 20.5% in pre-working age, and 19.2% of residents are in post-working age. There are 65.9 people of non-working age in the village of Wiszniów per 100 people of working age.

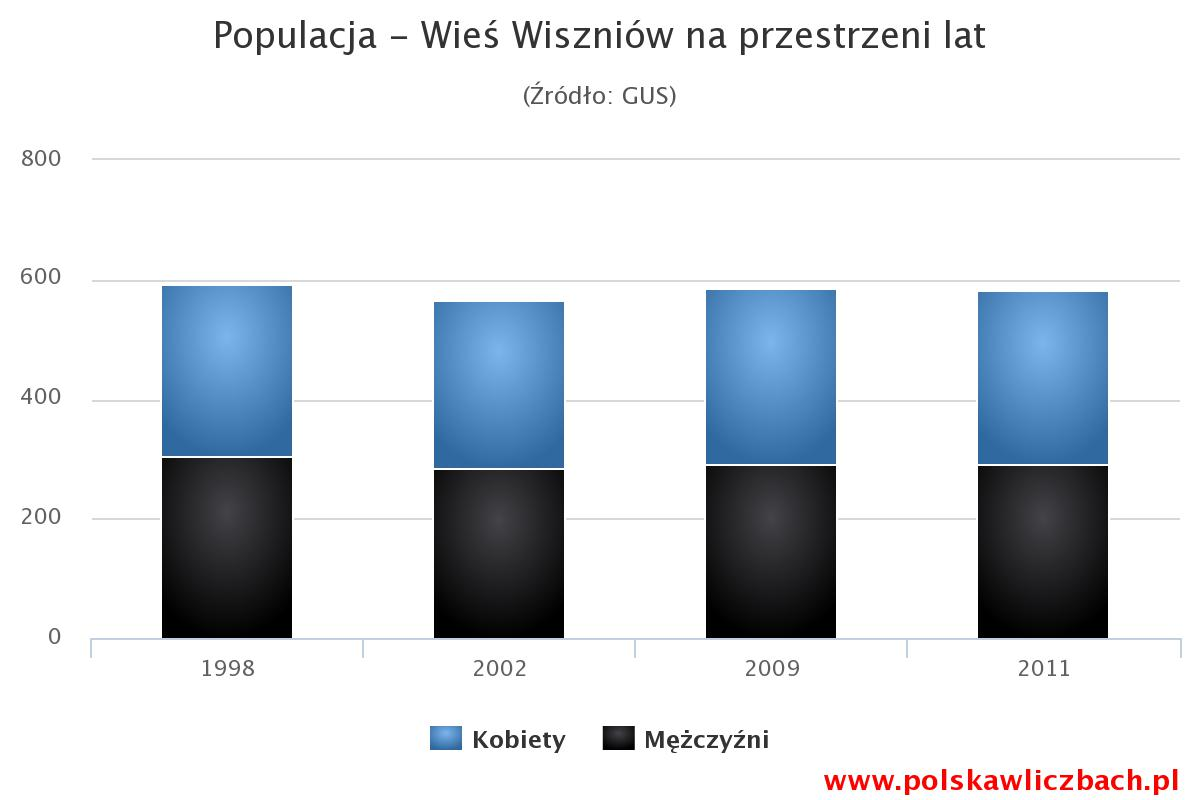
Demography

== History ==
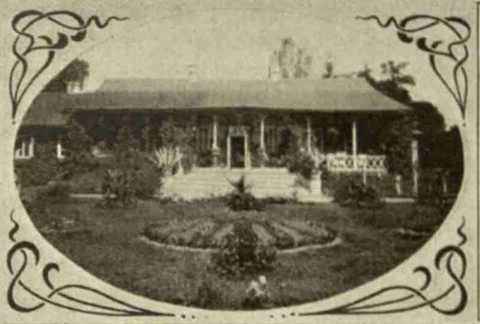
Manor of Kiełczewski family, 1910

The first information on the village dates from 1396. The first owner of the village was Mikołaj Mnich (1426). The next owner was Jan Makosiej. In 1564, the village owned 84 ha of arable land. According to the royal lustration of 1589, Wiszniów was the village of the Tyszowce district of the Bełz County of the Bełz Voivodeship of the Lesser Poland Province. Wiszniów was a possession of Makosiej, there were 5 farmland, 5 hedgehogs, 1 artisan and 4 surveyors. In 1827 Wiszniów had 78 houses and 393 inhabitants. At that time, the owners were Świeżawscy. The Świeżawscy sold the village to Seweryn Kiełczewski. The Kiełczewskis lived in Wiszniów in a wooden mansion. In 1921 there were 105 houses, 622 inhabitants. Most of the residents were Ukrainian. There were 27 Jews. During the Second World War, Wiszniów was burned. Many people, Ukrainians and Poles, were killed at that time. Probably all the Jews died. Ukrainians have been displaced to the Soviet Union. The Poles did not return after the war until 1947.

== Church ==
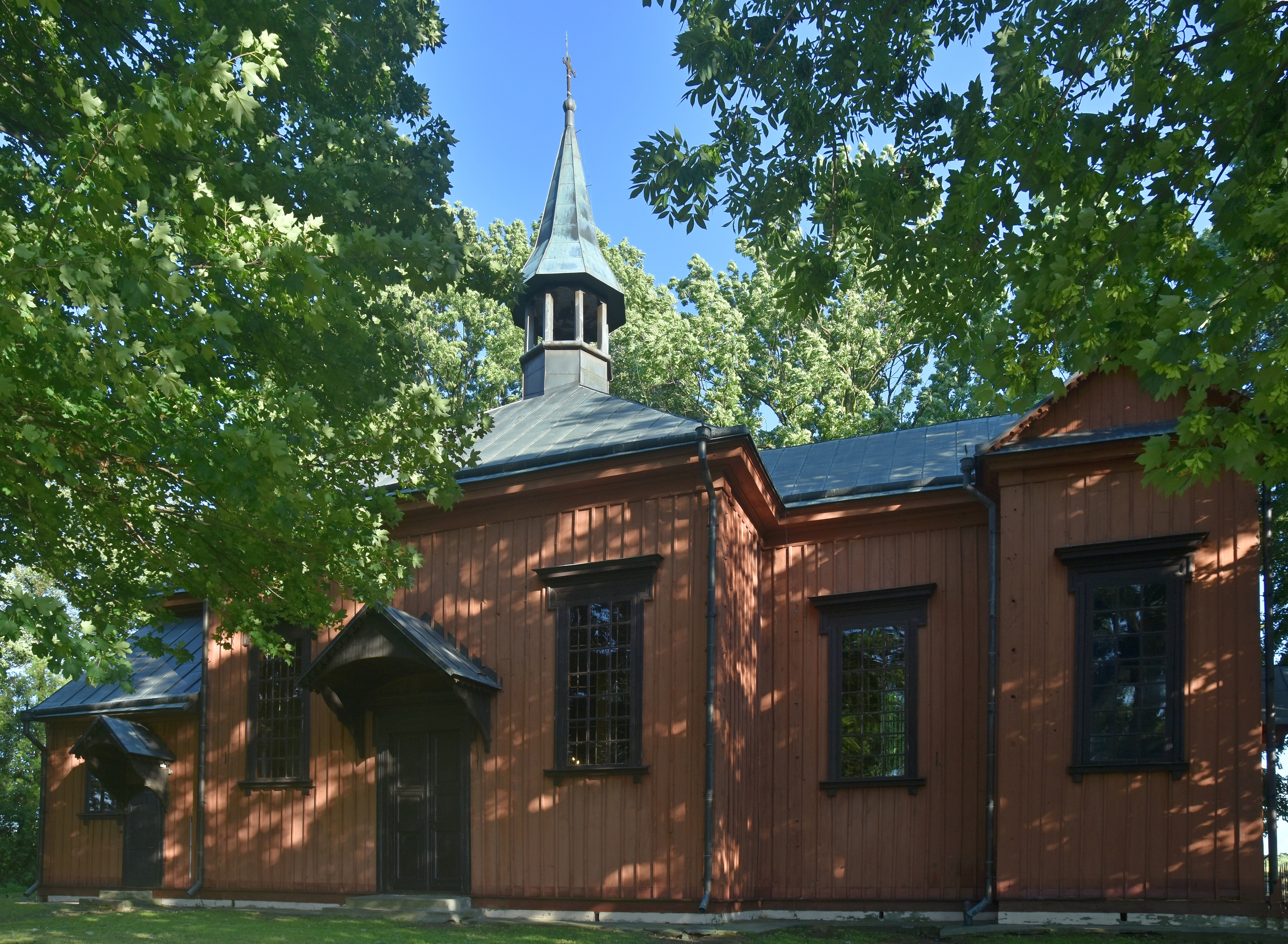
Saint Stanislaus church

The first information on the church dates from 1472. n 1531, the church was empty ("sinagoga deserta"). Another church was built in 1669, it was funded by King Michał Korybut Wiśniowiecki. The church was called Decapitation of the Saint Jeans. The new church was founded by Michał Radecki and Franciszek Świeżawski in 1780. The new church, which still exists today, was built in 1850. Władysław Kiełczewski was the founder of the church. In 1922, the church was converted to a Catholic church. The new parish is dedicated to Saint Stanislaus. The church was rebuilt (1922, 1954, 1987). The church is registered in the monument register.

== Notable people ==
- Jan Redzej, an officer of the Polish Army born in Wiszniów, participant in the Warsaw Uprising, prisoner of the Nazi Auschwitz-Birkenau camp, from which he escaped along with Witold Pilecki and Edward Ciesielski on the night of April 26–27, 1943.
- Adam Barszcz, a sergeant born in Wiszniów, a Polish pilot, served in the Royal Air Force.
