= Kadłubiska, Hrubieszów County =

Kadłubiska
- Village
- Location within Poland
- Coordinates: 50°35′13″N 24°0′57″E
- Country: Poland
- Voivodeship: Lublin
- County: Hrubieszów
- Gmina: Dołhobyczów
- Population: 208

Kadłubiska [kadwuˈbiska] is a village in the administrative district of Gmina Dołhobyczów, within Hrubieszów County, Lublin Voivodeship, in eastern Poland, close to the border with Ukraine.
