= Dołhobyczów-Kolonia =

- Village
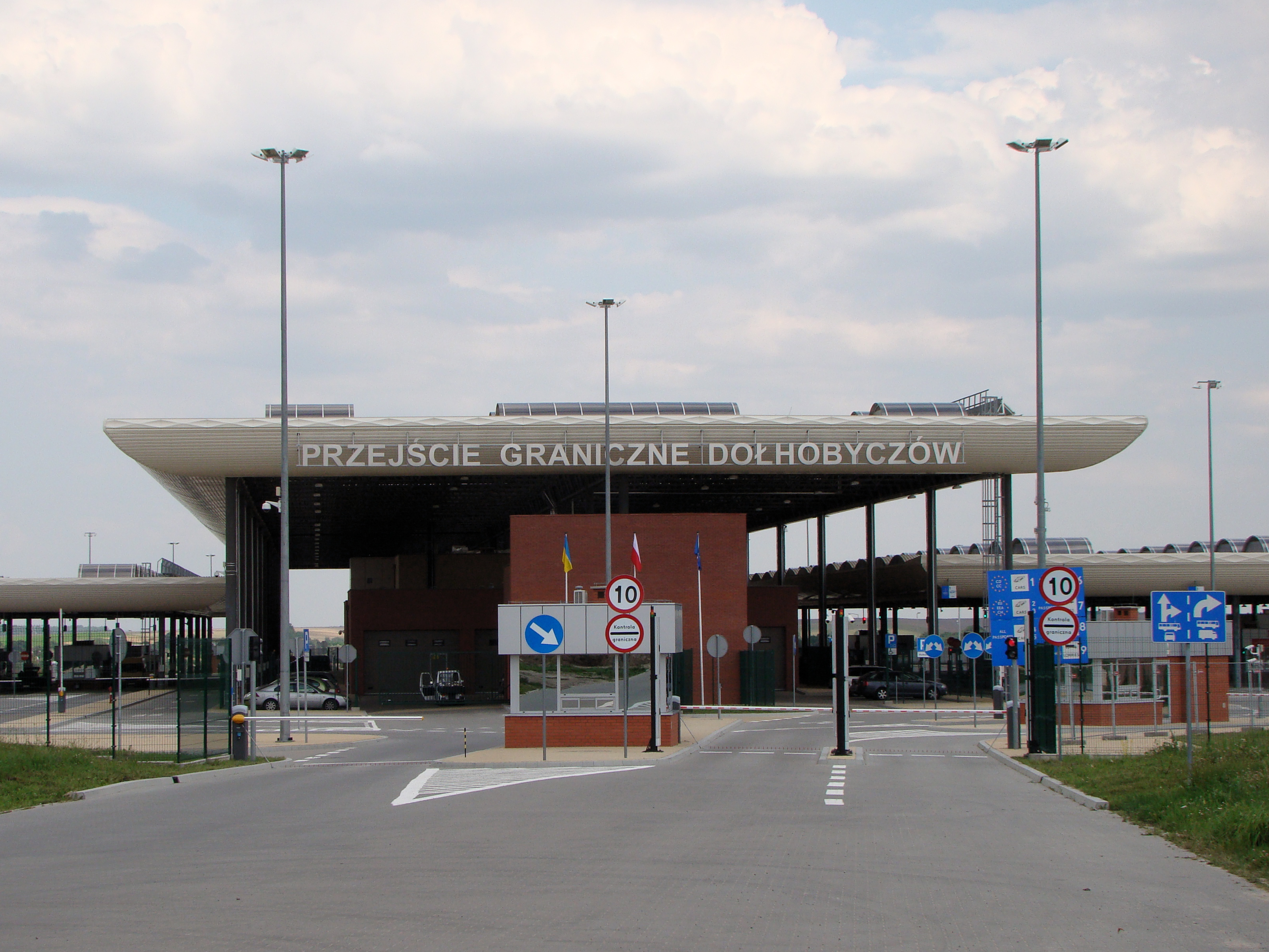
- Border checkpoint in Dołhobyczów-Kolonia

- Location within Poland
- Coordinates: 50°34′49″N 24°4′5″E
- Country: Poland
- Voivodeship: Lublin
- County: Hrubieszów
- Gmina: Dołhobyczów

Dołhobyczów-Kolonia (Polish pronunciation: [dɔwxɔˈbɨt͡ʂuf]) is a village in the administrative district of Gmina Dołhobyczów, within Hrubieszów County, Lublin Voivodeship, in eastern Poland, close to the border with Ukraine.
