= Hrubieszów County =

Hrubieszów County Powiat hrubieszowski
- County
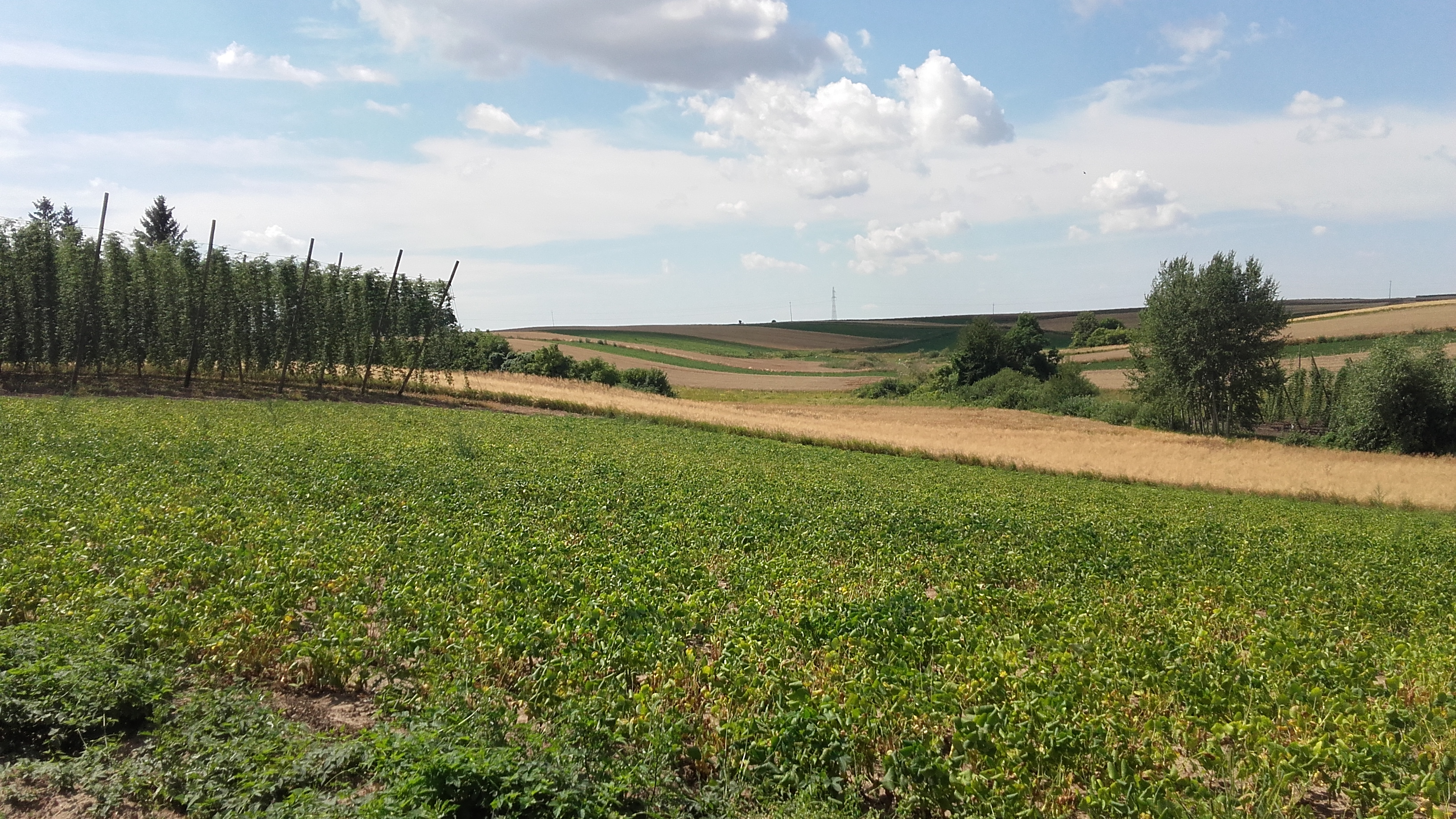
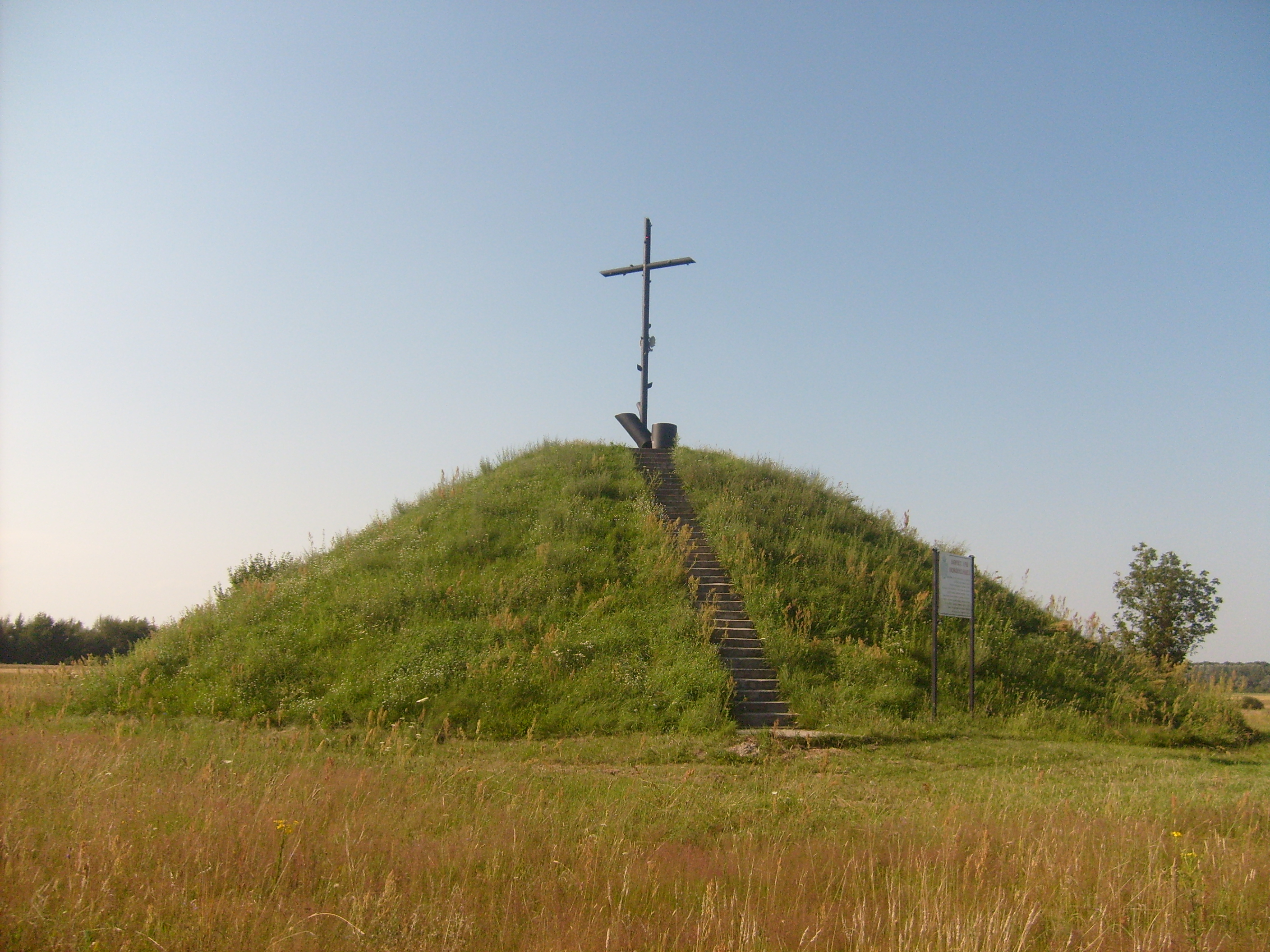
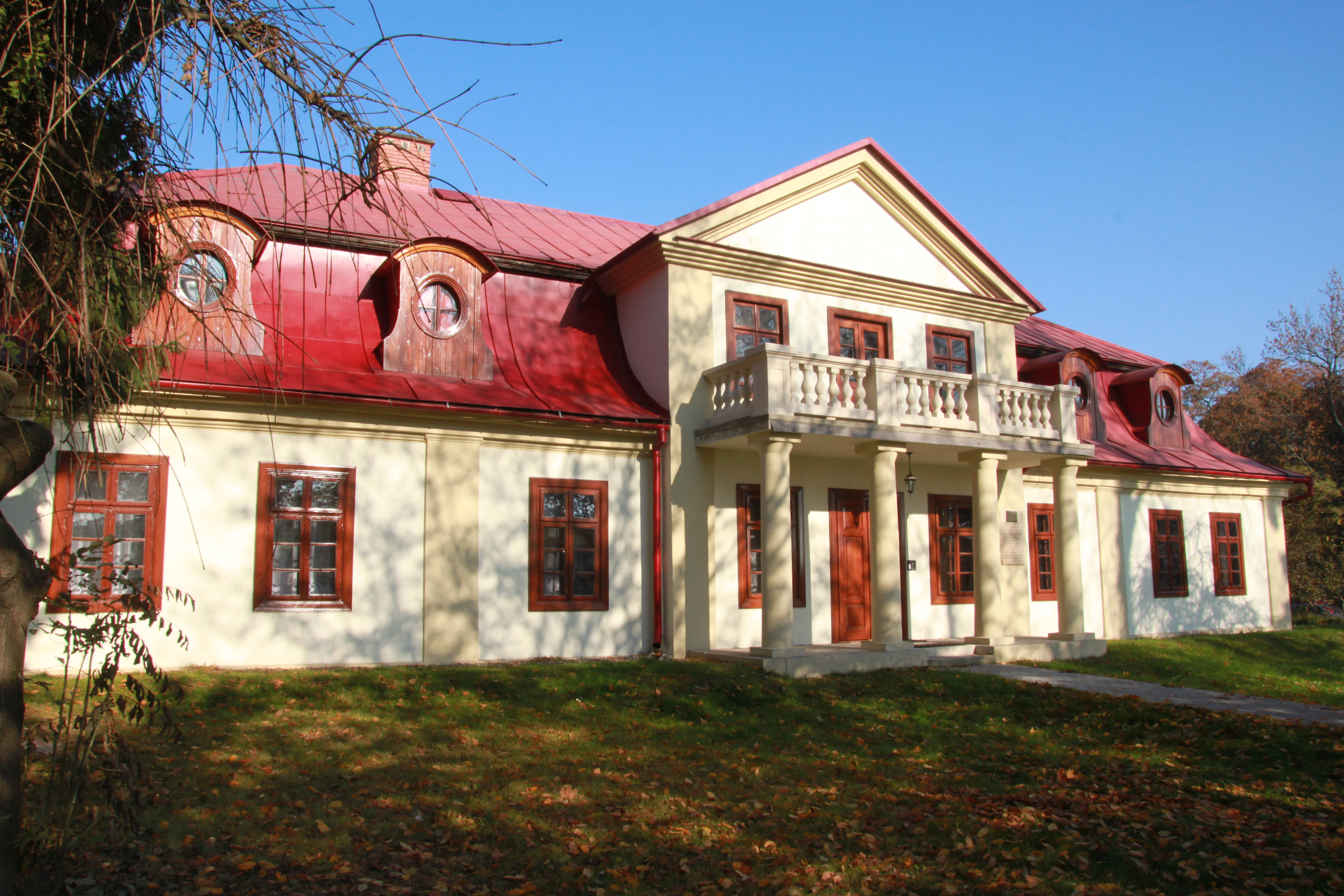
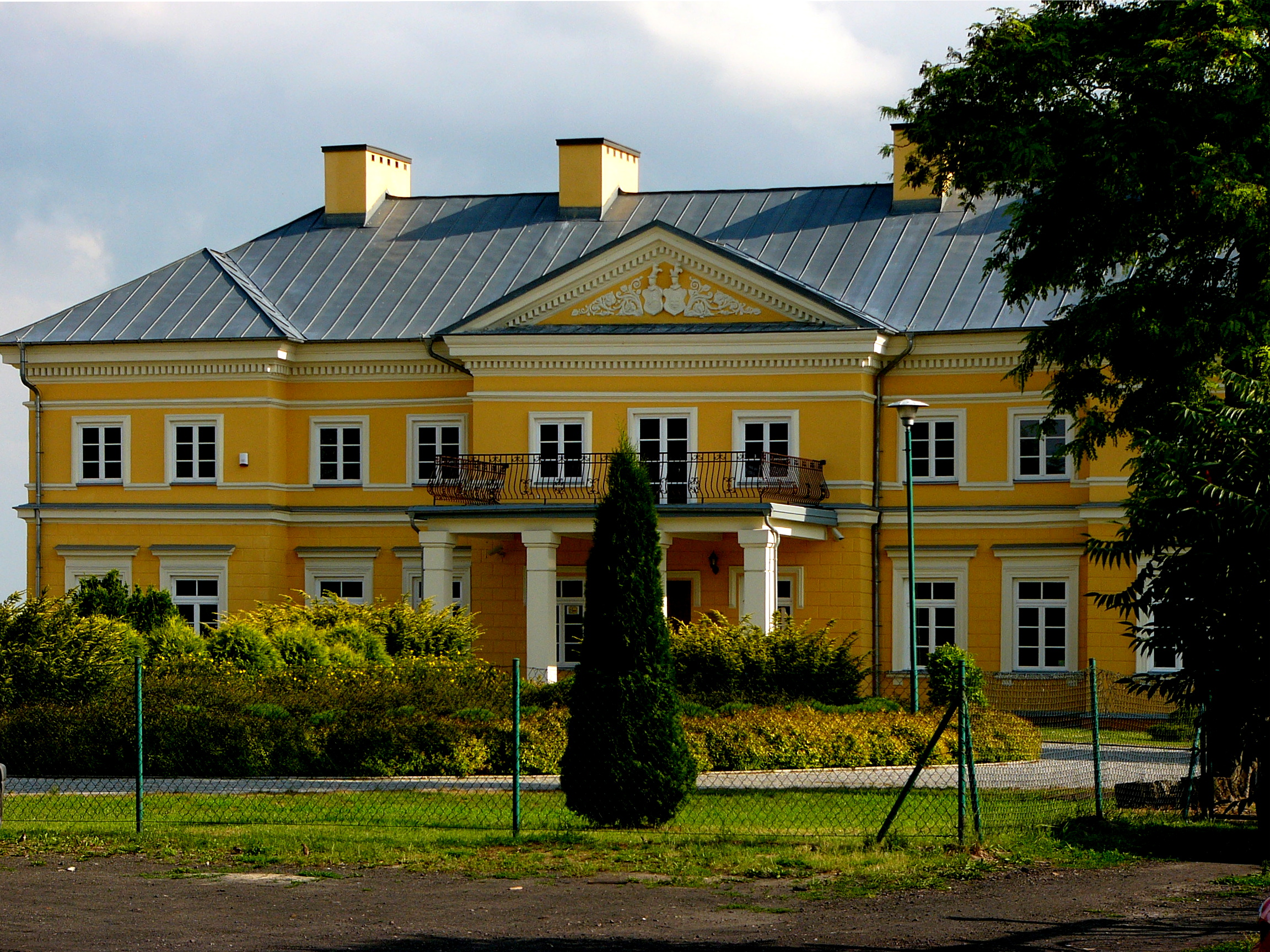
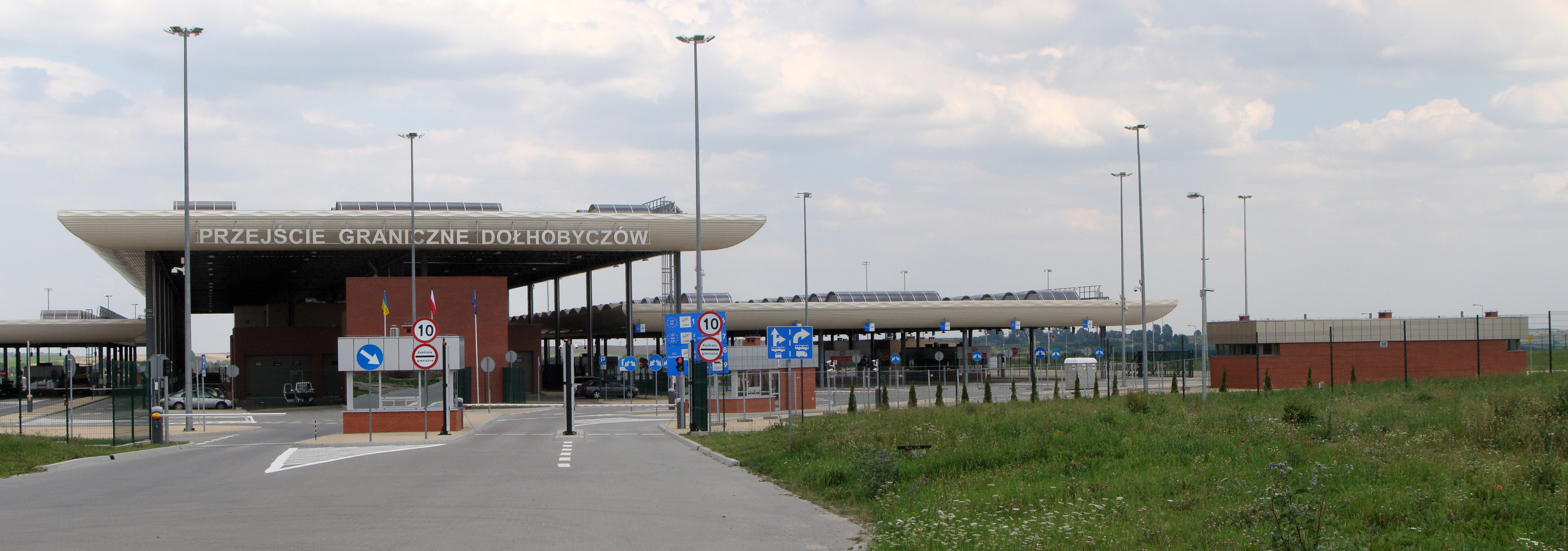
- Countryside in Wiszniów Union of Horodło Mound Birthplace of Bolesław Prus in Hrubieszów Lubomirski Palace in Strzyżów Dołhobyczów border crossing

- Coat of arms

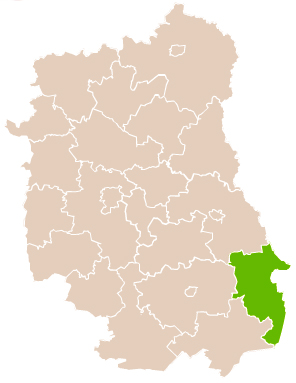
- Location within the voivodeship
- Coordinates (Hrubieszów): 50°49′N 23°53′E
- Country: Poland
- Voivodeship: Lublin
- Seat: Hrubieszów
- Gminas: Total 8 (incl. 1 urban): Hrubieszów; Gmina Dołhobyczów; Gmina Horodło; Gmina Hrubieszów; Gmina Mircze; Gmina Trzeszczany; Gmina Uchanie; Gmina Werbkowice

Area
  - Total: 1,269.45 km^{2} (490.14 sq mi)

Population (2019)
  - Total: 63,320
  - Density: 49.88/km^{2} (129.2/sq mi)
  - Urban: 17,634
  - Rural: 45,686
- Time zone: UTC+1 (CET)
  - Summer (DST): UTC+2 (CEST)
- Car plates: LHR
- Website: www.hrubieszow.pl/starostwo

Hrubieszów County (Polish: powiat hrubieszowski) is a unit of territorial administration and local government (powiat) in Lublin Voivodeship, eastern Poland, on the border with Ukraine. It was established on January 1, 1999, as a result of the Polish local government reforms passed in 1998. Its administrative seat and only town is Hrubieszów, which lies 104 kilometres (65 mi) south-east of the regional capital Lublin.

The county covers an area of 1,269.40 square kilometres (490.1 sq mi). As of 2019, its total population is 63,320, out of which the population of Hrubieszów is 17,634 and the rural population is 45.686.

== Neighbouring counties ==
Hrubieszów County is bordered by Tomaszów County to the south-west, Zamość County to the west and Chełm County to the north-west. It also borders Ukraine to the east.

== Administrative divisions ==
The county is subdivided into eight gminas (one urban and seven rural). These are listed in the following table, in descending order of population.

Gmina	Type	Area (km^{2})	Population (2019)	Seat
Hrubieszów	urban	33.0	17,634	
Gmina Hrubieszów	rural	259.2	10,014	Hrubieszów *
Gmina Werbkowice	rural	188.3	9,362	Werbkowice
Gmina Mircze	rural	233.8	7,065	Mircze
Gmina Dołhobyczów	rural	214.2	5,410	Dołhobyczów
Gmina Horodło	rural	130.3	5,161	Horodło
Gmina Uchanie	rural	120.8	4,543	Uchanie
Gmina Trzeszczany	rural	90.2	4,131	Trzeszczany
* seat not part of the gmina
