= Rogów =

Rogow or Rogów may refer to:

== Places ==
- Rogów, Greater Poland Voivodeship (west-central Poland)
- Rogów, Lesser Poland Voivodeship (south Poland)
- Rogów, Brzeziny County in Łódź Voivodeship (central Poland)
- Rogów, Łęczyca County in Łódź Voivodeship (central Poland)
- Rogów, Piotrków County in Łódź Voivodeship (central Poland)
- Rogów, Gmina Wilków in Opole County, Lublin Voivodeship (east Poland)
- Rogów, Zamość County in Lublin Voivodeship (east Poland)
- Rogów, Sokołów County in Masovian Voivodeship (east-central Poland)
- Rogów, Szydłowiec County in Masovian Voivodeship (east-central Poland)
- Rogów, Opole Voivodeship (south-west Poland)
- Rogów, Silesian Voivodeship (southern Poland)
- Rogów, Kazimierza County in Świętokrzyskie Voivodeship (south-central Poland)
- Rogów, Końskie County in Świętokrzyskie Voivodeship (south-central Poland)
- Rogów, West Pomeranian Voivodeship (north-west Poland)

== Other ==
- Rogow (surname)
