= Criticism of ExxonMobil =

Overview of controversies and criticisms of ExxonMobil

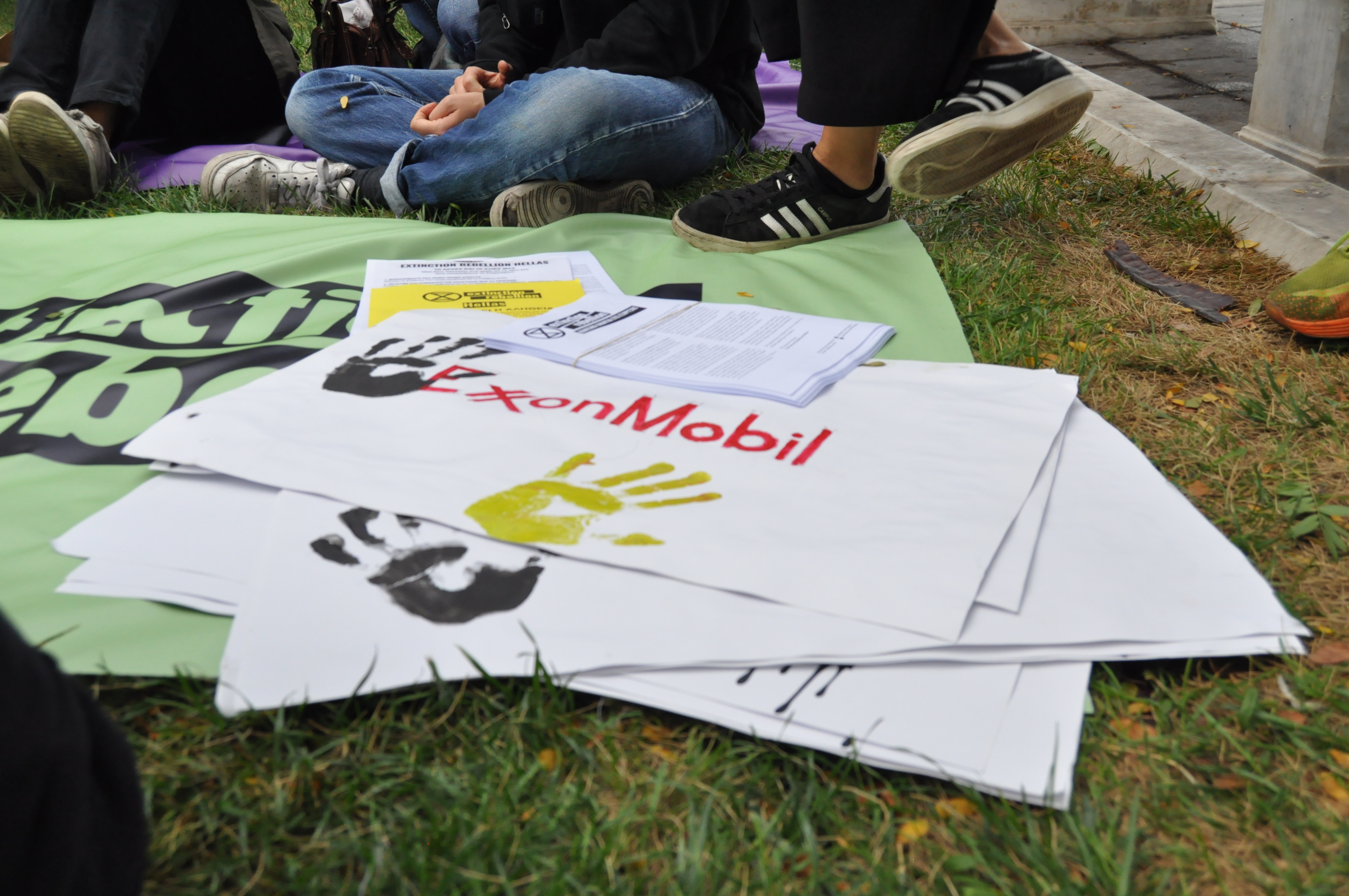
Signs protesting against ExxonMobil made by Extinction Rebellion

As the world's largest majority investor-owned oil and gas corporation, ExxonMobil has received significant amounts of controversy and criticism, mostly due to its activities which increase the speed of climate change and its denial of global warming.

The largest direct descendant of Standard Oil is also attributed to various human rights violations, especially in Indonesia, and for its vast possession and usage of geopolitical influence. The latter of which has given rise to ExxonMobil being referred to as a "private empire", a describer first used by journalist Steve Coll.

== Environmental incidents ==
ExxonMobil's environmental record has faced much criticism for its stance and impact on global warming. In 2018, the Political Economy Research Institute ranks ExxonMobil tenth among American corporations emitting airborne pollutants, thirteenth by emitting greenhouse gases, and sixteenth by emitting water pollutants. A 2017 report places ExxonMobil as the fifth largest contributor to greenhouse gas emissions from 1998 to 2015.As of 2005, ExxonMobil had committed less than 1% of their profits towards researching alternative energy, which, according to the advocacy organization Ceres, is less than other leading oil companies. According to the 2021 Arctic Environmental Responsibility Index (AERI), ExxonMobil is ranked as the 6th most environmentally responsible company among 120 oil, gas, and mining companies involved in resource extraction north of the Arctic Circle.

=== Exxon Valdez oil spill ===
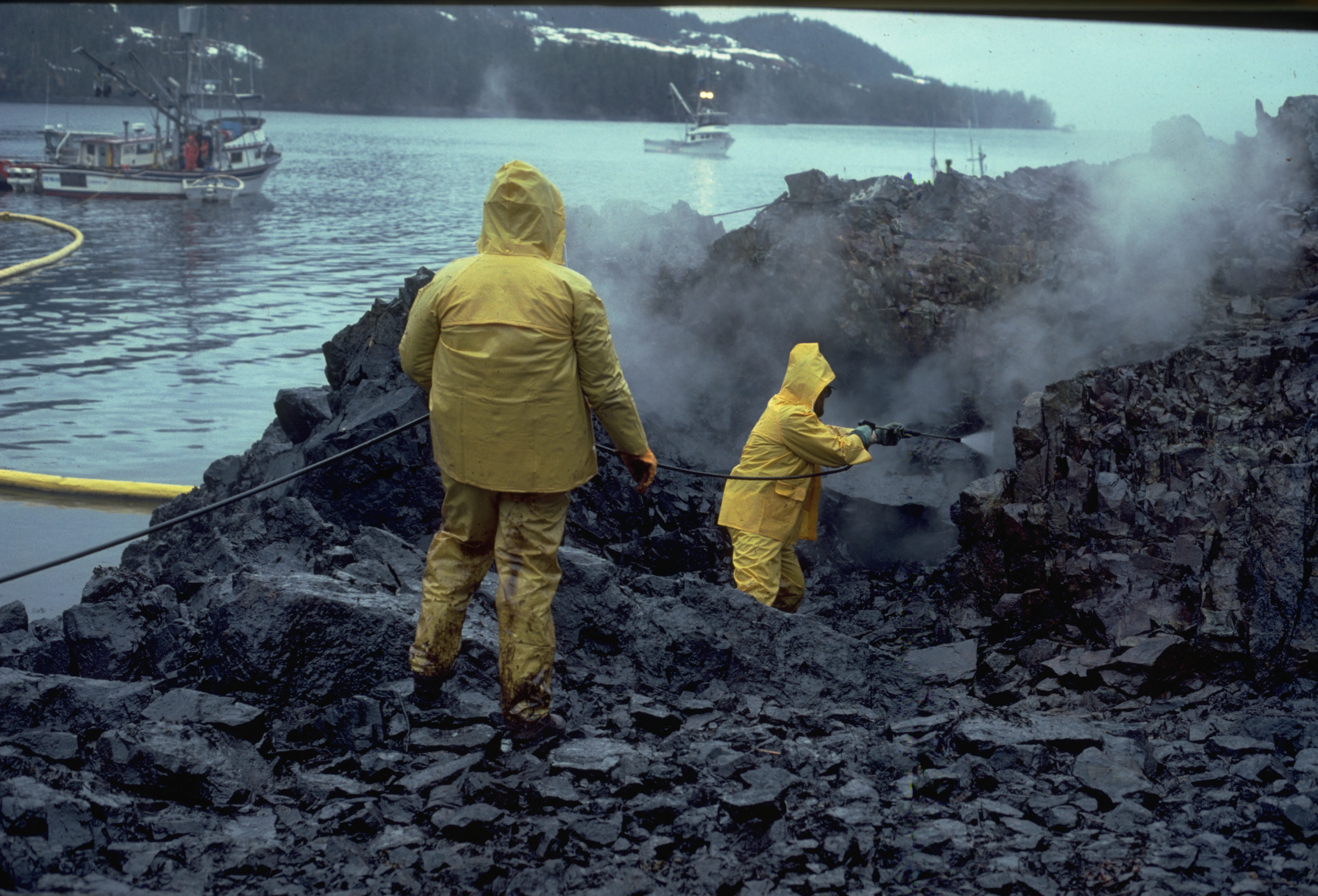
Exxon Valdez oil spill cleanup

The March 24, 1989, Exxon Valdez oil spill resulted in the discharge of approximately 11 million US gallons (42,000 m^{3})of oil into Prince William Sound, oiling 1,300 miles (2,100 km) of the remote Alaskan coastline.

The State of Alaska's Exxon Valdez Oil Spill Trustee Council stated that the spill "is widely considered the number one spill worldwide in terms of damage to the environment". Carcasses were found of over 35,000 birds and 1,000 sea otters. Because carcasses typically sink to the seafloor, it is estimated the death toll may be 250,000 seabirds, 2,800 sea otters, 300 harbor seals, 250 bald eagles, and up to 22 killer whales. Billions of salmon and herring eggs were also killed. It had a devastating effect on the local Alaska Native populations, many of which had for centuries relied largely on fishing to survive.

Exxon was widely criticized for its slow response to cleaning up the disaster. John Devens, the Mayor of Valdez, has said his community felt betrayed by Exxon's inadequate response to the crisis. Exxon later removed the name "Exxon" from its tanker shipping subsidiary, which it renamed "SeaRiver Maritime". The renamed subsidiary, though wholly Exxon-controlled, has a separate corporate charter and board of directors, and the former Exxon Valdez is now the SeaRiver Mediterranean. The renamed tanker is legally owned by a small, stand-alone company, which would have minimal ability to pay out on claims in the event of a further accident.

After a trial, a jury ordered ExxonMobil to pay $5 billion in punitive damages, though an appeals court reduced that amount by half. ExxonMobil appealed further, and on June 25, 2008, the United States Supreme Court lowered the amount to $500 million.

=== Exxon's Brooklyn oil spill ===
New York Attorney General Andrew Cuomo announced on July 17, 2007, that he had filed suit against the ExxonMobil Corp. and ExxonMobil Refining and Supply Co. to force cleanup of the oil spill at Greenpoint, Brooklyn, and to restore Newtown Creek.

A study of the spill released by the US Environmental Protection Agency in September 2007 reported that the spill consists of 17 to 30 million US gallons (64,000 to 114,000 m^{3}) of petroleum products from the mid-19th century to the mid-20th century. The largest portion of these operations were by ExxonMobil or its predecessors. By comparison, the Exxon Valdez oil spill was approximately 11 million US gallons (42,000 m^{3}). The study reported that in the early 20th century Standard Oil of New York operated a major refinery in the area where the spill is located. The refinery produced fuel oils, gasoline, kerosene and solvents. Naptha and gas oil, secondary products, were also stored in the refinery area. Standard Oil of New York later became Mobil, a predecessor to ExxonMobil.

=== Baton Rouge refinery and Cancer Alley ===
ExxonMobil and other energy and chemical companies' activities in the Baton Rouge area, specifically the pollution which occurs from it, have incited the area being nicknamed Cancer Alley (sometimes also nicknamed the Petrochemical corridor) given the pollution being a major cause for increased cancer patients in the area. Clean air is noted to be never a guarantee within the area, and other diseases have been tracked to originate from refining activities.

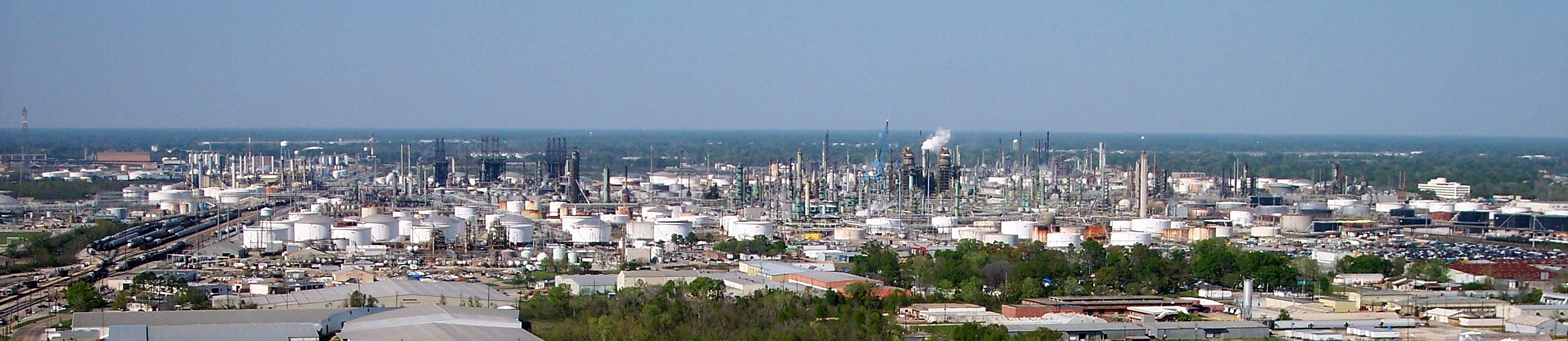
ExxonMobil refinery in Baton Rouge

==== 2012 oil spill ====
In April 2012, a crude oil pipeline, from the Exxon Corp Baton Rouge Refinery, burst and spilled at least 1,900 barrels of oil (80,000 gallons) in the rivers of Point Coupee Parish, Louisiana, shutting down the Exxon Corp Baton Refinery for a few days. Regulators opened an investigation in response to the pipeline oil spill.

==== 2012 benzene leak ====
On June 14, 2012, a bleeder plug on a tank in the Baton Rouge Refinery failed and began leaking naphtha, a substance that is composed of many chemicals including benzene. ExxonMobil originally reported to the Louisiana Department of Environmental Quality (LDEQ) that 1,364 pounds of material had been leaked.

On June 18, Baton Rouge refinery representatives told the LDEQ that ExxonMobil's chemical team determined that the June 14 spill was actually a level 2 incident classification, which means that a significant response to the leak was required. On the day of the spill the refinery did not report that their estimate of spilled materials was significantly different from what was originally reported to the department. Because the spill estimate and the actual amount of chemicals spilled varied drastically, the LDEQ launched an in-depth investigation on June 16 to determine the actual amounts of chemicals spilled as well as to find out what information the refinery knew and when they knew it. On June 20, ExxonMobil sent an official notification to the LDEQ saying that the leak had actually released 28,688 pounds of benzene, 10,882 pounds of toluene, 1,100 pounds of cyclohexane, 1,564 pounds of hexane and 12,605 pounds of additional volatile organic compound. After the spill, people living in neighboring communities reported adverse health impacts such as severe headaches and respiratory difficulties.

=== Yellowstone River oil spill ===
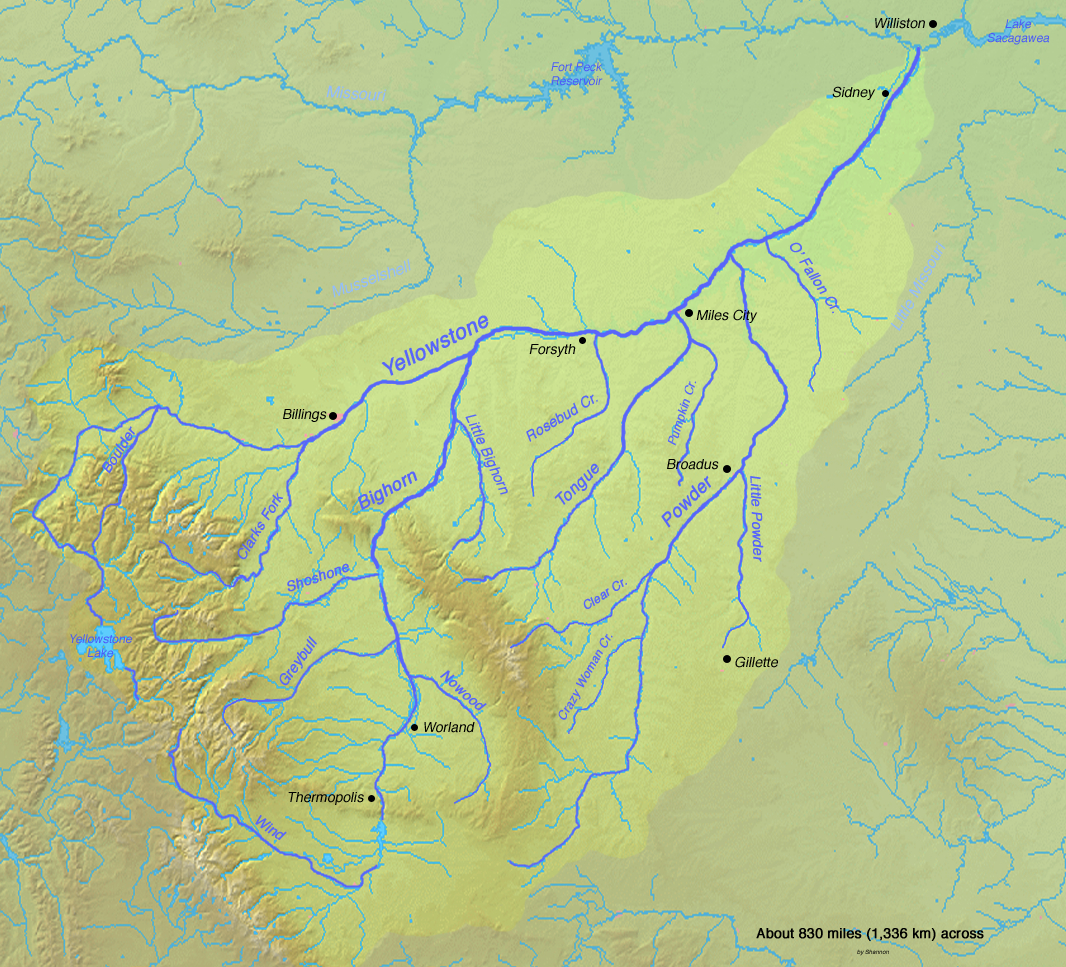
Map of the Yellowstone River watershed

The July 2011 Yellowstone River oil spill was an oil spill from an ExxonMobil pipeline running from Silver Tip to Billings, Montana, which ruptured about 10 miles west of Billings on July 1, 2011, at about 11:30 pm. The resulting spill leaked an estimated 1,500 barrels of oil into the Yellowstone River for about 30 minutes before it was shut down, resulting in about $135 million in damages. As a precaution against a possible explosion, officials in Laurel, Montana evacuated about 140 people on Saturday (July 2) just after midnight, then allowed them to return at 4 am.

A spokesman for ExxonMobil said that the oil is within 10 miles of the spill site. However, Montana Governor Brian Schweitzer disputed the accuracy of that figure. The governor pledged that "The parties responsible will restore the Yellowstone River."

=== Mayflower oil spill ===
On March 29, 2013, the Pegasus Pipeline, owned by ExxonMobil and carrying Canadian Wabasca heavy crude, ruptured in Mayflower, Arkansas, releasing about 3,190 barrels (507 m^{3}) of oil and forcing the evacuation of 22 homes. The Environmental Protection Agency has classified the leak as a major spill. In 2015, ExxonMobil settled charges that it violated the federal Clean Water Act and state environmental laws, for $5.07 million, including $4.19 million in civil penalties. It did not admit liability.

=== Sakhalin-I ===
Scientists and environmental groups have voiced concern that the Sakhalin-I oil and gas project in the Russian Far East, operated by an ExxonMobil subsidiary Exxon Neftegas, threatens the critically endangered western gray whale population. Particular concerns were caused by the decision to construct a pier and to start shipping in Piltun Lagoon. ExxonMobil has responded that since 1997 the company has invested over $40 million to the western whale monitoring program.

ExxonMobil announced it would be fully pulling out of Sakhalin-I in March 2022, in response to the 2022 Russian invasion of Ukraine.

=== New Jersey wetlands ===
In 2004, the New Jersey Department of Environmental Protection sued ExxonMobil for $8.9 billion for lost wetland resources at Constable Hook in Bayonne and Bayway Refinery in Linden. Although a New Jersey Superior Court justice was believed to be close to a ruling, the Christie Administration repeatedly asked the judge to wait, since they were reaching a settlement with ExxonMobil's attorneys. On Friday, February 19, 2015, lawyers for the Christie administration informed the judge that a deal had been reached. Details of the $225 million settlement – roughly 3% of what the state originally sought – were not immediately released. Christopher Porrino served as Chief Counsel to the Christie administration from January 2014 through July 2015 and handled negotiations in the case.

== Response to climate change ==
From the late 1970s through the 1980s and prior to the merger with Mobil, Exxon funded research broadly in line with the developing public scientific approach. After the 1980s, Exxon curtailed its own climate research and became a leader in climate change denial. In 2014, ExxonMobil publicly acknowledged climate change risk. It nominally supports a carbon tax, though that support is weak, and one of the company's lobbyists admitted that ExxonMobil supports it only because it believes the tax will be almost impossible to implement.

ExxonMobil has made several climate pledges. It announced reduce methane emissions by 15% and reduce flaring by 25% by 2020. In November 2021, the company committed to increasing expenditures for various projects that are expected to reduce GHG emissions to $15 billion by 2027. Next month, it made a commitment to zero emissions from its operations in the US Permian Basin by 2030. In January 2022, it made a commitment to eliminate global GHG emissions from all its operations (known in carbon accounting as Scopes 1 and 2), but not from the use of its products (Scope 3), by 2050.

=== ExxonKnew movement and Willie Soon ===
ExxonMobil's climate change controversies coupled with a 2015 email leak showing that Exxon was aware of climate change since 1981 sparked the inception of the "ExxonKnew" movement. ExxonKnew's earliest roots are traced to a 2012 meeting of activist lawyers (which defenders of ExxonMobil call the La Jolla Junta). The movement has attracted donations and financial support from 350.org and philanthropic funds affiliated with the Rockefeller family.

The movement and wide coverage of the email release led multiple US states to investigate the company. ExxonMobil's efforts to dismiss litigation failed in Massachusetts where that state's highest court ruled in 2022 that Exxon could stand trial.

ExxonMobil has criticised the movement, claiming it to be "a coordinated campaign perpetuated by activist groups with the aim of stigmatizing ExxonMobil".

In February 2015, it was revealed that climate denier and scientist Willie Soon had been paid by several fossil fuel interest groups. Greenpeace obtained documents showing that Soon had received a total of $1.25m from ExxonMobil, Southern Company, the American Petroleum Institute (API) and a foundation run by the Koch family over a period of 14 years. The scientist described his studies to fossil fuel executives as "deliverables", and permitted anonymous pre-publication reviews. Soon advanced the widely discredited theory that changes in solar activity are to blame for climate change, and called into question the severity and extent of climate change in all his studies, never revealing his backers.

== Geopolitical influence ==
A July 2012 Daily Telegraph review of Steve Coll's book, Private Empire: ExxonMobil and American Power, says that he thinks that ExxonMobil is "able to determine American foreign policy and the fate of entire nations". ExxonMobil increasingly drills in terrains leased to them by dictatorships, such as those in Chad and Equatorial Guinea. Steve Coll describes Lee Raymond, the corporation's chief executive until 2005, as "notoriously skeptical about climate change and disliked government interference at any level".

The book was also reviewed in The Economist, according to which "ExxonMobil is easy to caricature, and many critics have done so.... It is to Steve Coll's credit that Private Empire, his new book about ExxonMobil, refuses to subscribe to such a simplistic view." The review describes the company's power in dealing with the countries in which it drills as "constrained". It notes that the company shut down its operations in Indonesia to distance itself from the abuses committed against the population by that country's army and that it decided to drill in Chad only after the World Bank agreed to ensure that the oil royalties were used for the population's benefit. The review closes by noting that "A world addicted to ExxonMobil's product needs to look in the mirror before being too critical of how relentlessly the company supplies it."

In 1937, Iraq Petroleum Company (IPC), 23.75 percent owned by a corporate ancestor of ExxonMobil, signed an oil concession agreement with the Sultan of Muscat. IPC offered financial support to raise an armed force that would assist the Sultan in occupying the interior region of Oman, an area that geologists believed to be rich in oil. This led to the 1954 outbreak of Jebel Akhdar War in Oman that lasted for more than 5 years.

== Indonesian human rights violations ==
ExxonMobil is the target of human rights violations accusations for actions taken by the corporation in the Indonesian territory of Aceh. In June 2001, a lawsuit against ExxonMobil was filed in the Federal District Court of the District of Columbia under the Alien Tort Claims Act. The suit alleges that the ExxonMobil knowingly assisted human rights violations, including torture, murder and rape, by employing and providing material support to Indonesian military forces, who committed the alleged offenses during civil unrest in Aceh. Human rights complaints involving Exxon's (Exxon and Mobil had not yet merged) relationship with the Indonesian military first arose in 1992; the company denies these accusations and filed a motion to dismiss the suit, which was denied in 2008 by a federal judge, though granted by another federal judge in August 2009.

== 2022 rise in oil prices ==
ExxonMobil was one of the many large oil and gas companies which reported record profits on multiple instances in 2022, amidst the Russian invasion of Ukraine and the inflation surge, attracting global criticism. US President Joe Biden has criticized ExxonMobil specifically, and in June amidst record oil prices, stated that "Exxon made more money than God this year". CNN ran a headline amidst the oil giant reporting its second quarter earnings in 2022, calculating that Exxon made $2,245.62 USD per second in profit across the 92-day long second quarter. Biden again slammed Exxon and the rest of the oil industry during third quarter earnings calls, urging the US Congress to pass new taxes on the record profits companies like Exxon saw.

== Baton Rouge refinery nooses ==
In March 2023, ExxonMobil was sued by the federal government for the display of nooses in two of their Louisiana refineries. They are accused by the U.S. Equal Employment Opportunity Commission of creating a hostile work environment and violating civil rights laws. The nooses were discovered in a storage shed at their Baton Rouge refinery and in a tree at their Beaumont refinery. The lawsuit is seeking damages and an injunction to stop the company from displaying nooses in the future.

== See also ==
- Allison v. ExxonMobil Corp.
- Climate change denial
- Criticism of Chevron
- Engine No. 1
- History of ExxonMobil
- People of the State of New York v. Exxon Mobil Corp.
- The Power of Big Oil
