= Grabowiec, Zamość County =

Grabowiec
- Village
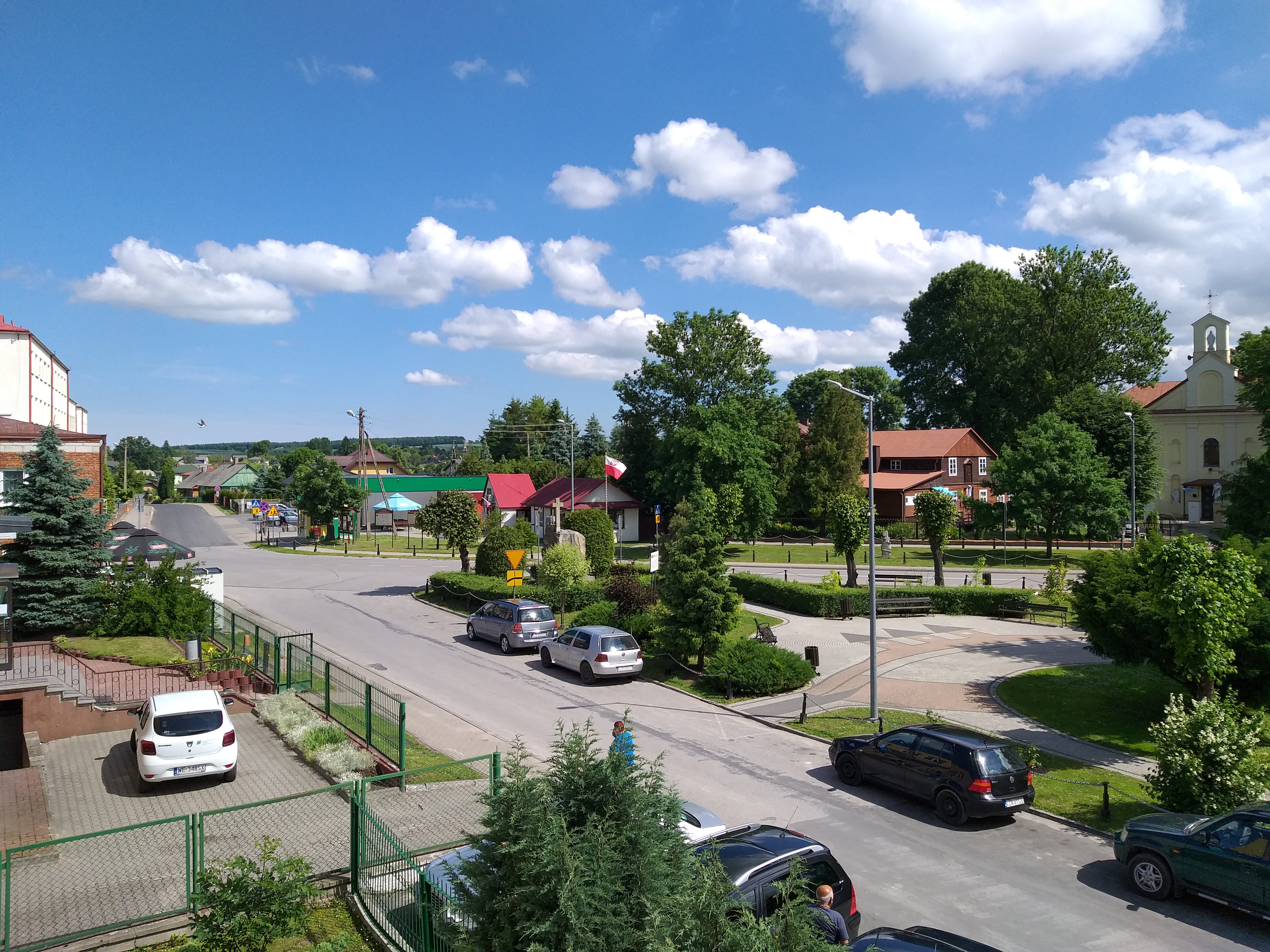

- Location within Poland
- Coordinates: 50°49′16″N 23°32′48″E
- Country: Poland
- Voivodeship: Lublin
- County: Zamość
- Gmina: Grabowiec

Population
  - Total: 922
- Time zone: UTC+1 (CET)
  - Summer (DST): UTC+2 (CEST)
- Vehicle registration: LZA

Grabowiec ([ɡraˈbɔvjɛt͡s]) is a village in Zamość County, Lublin Voivodeship, in eastern Poland. It is the seat of the gmina (administrative district) called Gmina Grabowiec.

== History ==
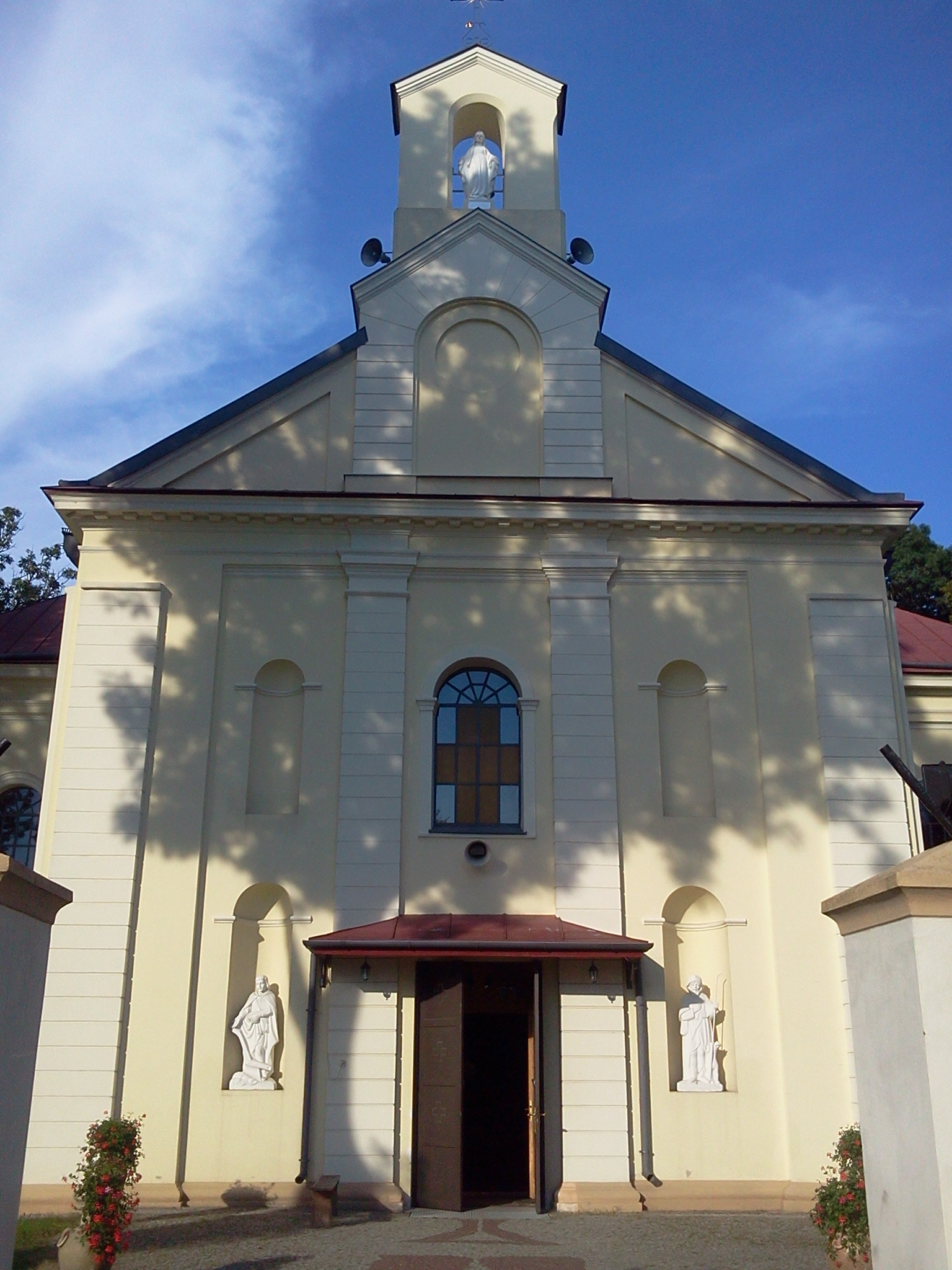
Saint Nicholas church

During the joint German-Soviet invasion of Poland, which started World War II, on September 25, 1939, the Soviets carried out a massacre of wounded Polish prisoners-of-war in Grabowiec. That event has been called the "Little Katyn". Tadeusz Piotrowski mentions the death of 12 Polish Army officers in this context.

On 10 October 1939, the village was handed over by the Soviets to Nazi Germany in accordance with the Molotov–Ribbentrop Pact. Before the outbreak of the Holocaust, 2,356 Jews lived in Grabowiec. The Jewish population was quickly and violently rounded up for slave labor. After a while, the Germans evicted the Jews from their houses and concentrated them in a ghetto. Some 2,000 Jews were crowded into a few streets – a few families to each apartment. The Germans set up a labor camp 10 kilometres (6.2 mi) from Grabowiec and employed workers from there and nearby towns. They appointed a Judenrat in the town, whose task it was to provide Jews for slave labor and to obey German orders. In November 1941, 50 Jews from Kraków arrived in the ghetto. During the autumn of 1941, the situation deteriorated, even more, when the ghetto was fenced in and exit from it forbidden. In May 1942, 600 Jews from nearby towns were crammed into the ghetto. The total number of inmates in the Grabowiec ghetto at this point was 2,050. In the winter of 1941 and 1942 furs, gloves, fur hats and gold were confiscated from local Jews. On 21 May 1942, the German troops shot 33 Jews. On 8 June 1942, in the early morning, SS troops, aided by Blue Police, dragged the Jews from their houses and assembled them in the market square. They were taken to the station at Miączyn, some 10 km (6.2 mi) away, where they were sorted. Some scores of ill people were murdered on the spot; about 800 Jews fit for work were sent back to Grabowiec at the request of their Nazi employers, while the remainder – some 1,200 souls – were dispatched in wagons to the extermination camp at Sobibór. In October 1942, the remaining Jews in Grabowiec were likewise sent there and murdered. This October transport is described by eyewitness Dr. Michael Temchin, who also was on the transport but was able to escape one of the train cars destined for Sobibór, in his book "The Witch Doctor". The Jewish population ceased to exist and was never reconstituted.
