= Criticism of Chevron =

Overview of controversies involving Chevron Corporation

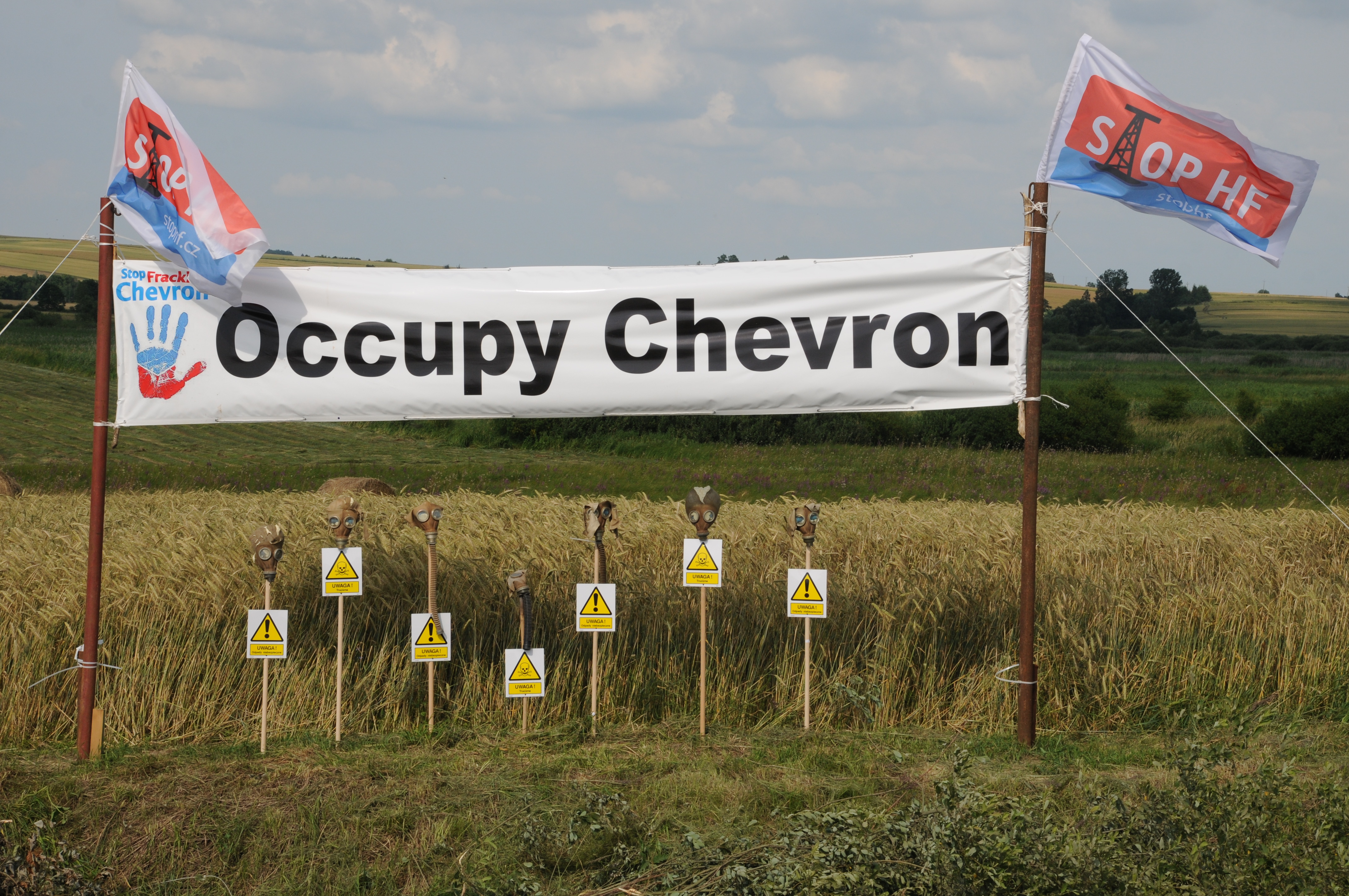
Anti-Chevron banners in Żurawlów, Poland

Chevron Corporation has been one of the most widely-criticized companies in the world, generally stemming from its activities and their relation to climate change. Chevron's most widely-known scandal involves Texaco's activities in Ecuador's Lago Agrio oil field, which Chevron is deemed responsible for due to its acquisition of Texaco in 2001. Chevron has been most widely criticized for its handling of litigation against it filed by residents of the Lago Agrio region, which included the extensive persecution of Lago Agrio lawyer Steven Donziger, who spent 45 days in jail out of a 6 month sentence and 993 days under house arrest.

Climate change activists have also held an Anti Chevron Day since 2013, which is held on or around May 21 of every year to coincide with the general period of time that Chevron holds its annual meeting of shareholders.

== Lago Agrio activities ==
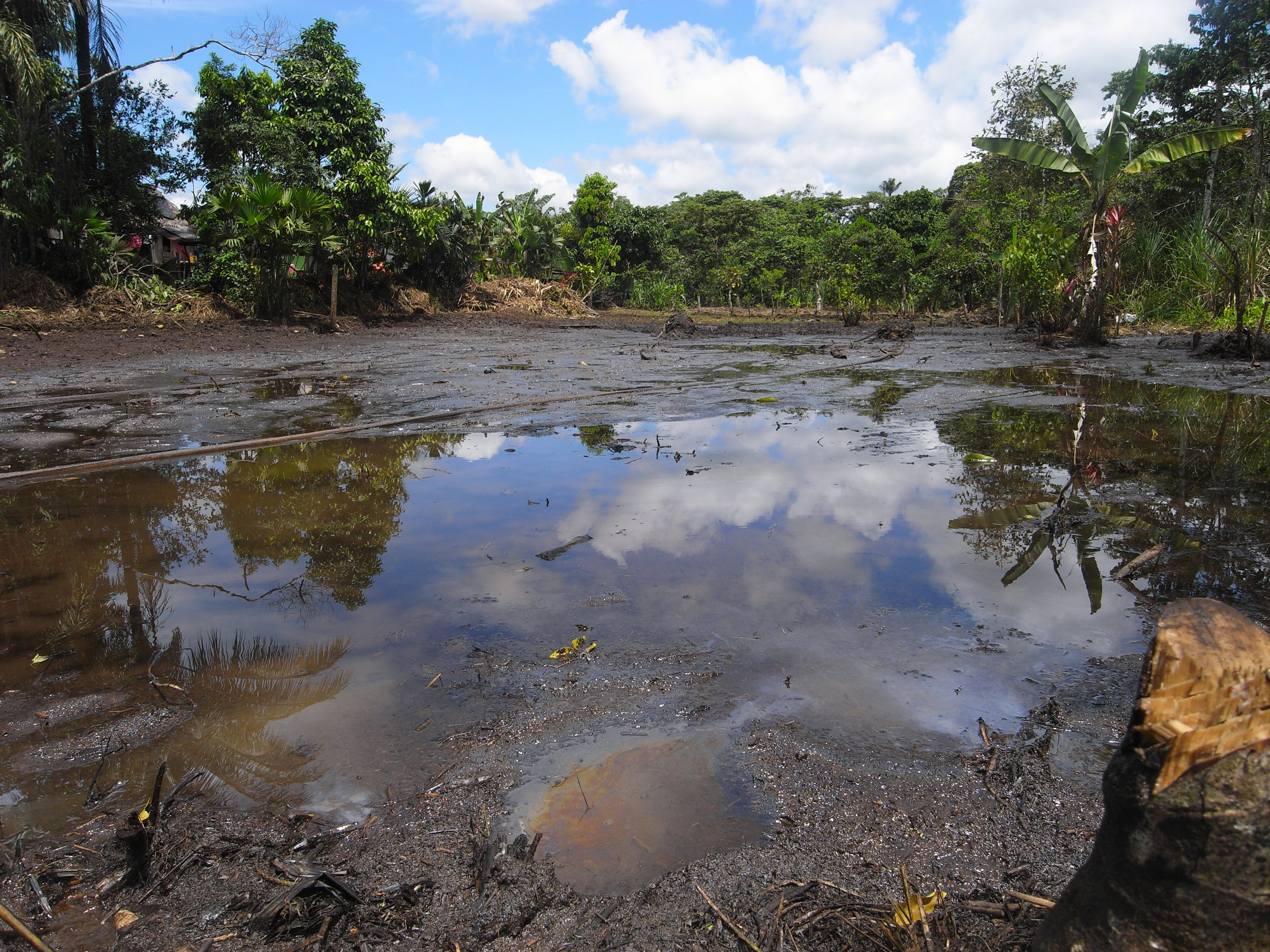
Oil pollution in Lago Agrio, November 2007

Texaco and Gulf Oil began operating in the Oriente region of Ecuador in 1964 as a consortium. Texaco operated the Lago Agrio oil field from 1967 to 1992 and the Ecuador state oil company continued to operate the same oil fields after Texaco left. In 1993, Texaco was found responsible for dumping billions of gallons of toxic waste and they spent $40m cleaning up the area during the 1990s. In 1998, the Ecuadorean government signed an agreement with Texaco accepting the clean-up as complete and absolving Texaco of any further responsibility. That same year, an Ecuadorean scientific team took water and soil samples after Texaco left and found petroleum hydrocarbons at unsafe levels in almost half. The clean up was called "a sham" by critics.

In 2003, a class action lawsuit against Chevron was filed in Ecuadorian court for $28 billion by indigenous residents, who accused Texaco of making residents ill and damaging forests and rivers by discharging 18 billion US gallons (68,000,000 m^{3}) of formation water into the Amazon rainforest without any environmental remediation. Chevron said that the company had completed cleanup of the pollution caused by Texaco, that current pollution was the result of activities of the Ecuadorian oil interests, and that the 1998 agreements with the Ecuadorian Government exempted the company from any liabilities.

In 2011, Ecuadorian residents were awarded $8.6 billion, based on claims of loss of crops and farm animals as well as increased local cancer rates. The plaintiffs said this would not be enough to make up for the damage caused by the oil company. The award was later revised to $19 billion on appeals, which was then appealed again to the Ecuadorean National Court of Justice. The action has been called the first time that indigenous people have successfully sued a multinational corporation in the country where the pollution took place.

Chevron described the lawsuit as an "extortion scheme" and refused to pay the fine.

In November 2013, the international arbitration tribunal issued a partial award in favor of Chevron and its subsidiary, Texaco Petroleum Company. The tribunal found Chevron not liable for environmental claims in Ecuador.

In March 2014, United States district court judge Lewis A. Kaplan ruled that the Ecuadorian plaintiff's lead attorney, Steven Donziger, had used "corrupt means," including "coercion, bribery, money laundering and other misconduct," to obtain the 2011 court verdict in Ecuador. The judge did not rule on the underlying issue of environmental damages. While the US ruling does not affect the decision of the court in Ecuador, it has blocked efforts to collect damages from Chevron in US courts. Donziger appealed. The appeals court ruled against Donziger because of his “egregious” misconduct, witness tampering, and judicial coercion and bribery, therefore reaffirming Donziger's disbarment. Some media later alleged that Chevron had paid a key witness in the case hundreds of thousands of dollars for his testimony, which he later admitted to have been false.

In April 2015, Amazon Watch released videos reportedly sent from a whistleblower inside Chevron. The videos purportedly show employees and consultants finding petroleum contamination at sites in the Ecuadorean Amazon that the company claimed was cleaned up years earlier. These videos were confirmed as legitimate by Chevron legal counsel. According to the company, the videos show routine testing to establish the perimeter of oil pits. The company further stated that it is not possible to determine from the videos whether the sites shown are the responsibility of Chevron or its former partner, Petroecuador. According to Amazon Watch, the videos contain a map confirming that the sites are Chevron's, and contain footage of interviews with villagers known to live in the area for which Chevron is responsible.

In September 2018, an international tribunal ruled in favor of Chevron Corp finding that Ecuador had violated its obligations under international treaties. The tribunal held that a $9.5 billion pollution judgment by Ecuador's Supreme Court against Chevron "was procured through fraud, bribery and corruption and was based on claims that had been already settled and released by the Republic of Ecuador years earlier." Ecuador's attorney general plans to appeal the tribunal's ruling saying, "It worries us that the tribunal is asking a country to lift a sentence of one of its courts that was issued as part of a dispute between private parties."

Chevron continues to take oil from the Amazon region at large. El Segundo (CA), Pascagoula (MS), and Richmond (CA) refineries all process Amazonian oil. In 2015 El Segundo was the single largest refiner in the U.S. of Amazon Crude, processing 54,463 barrels per day.

== Oil spills in Angola ==
Chevron has been one of the largest offshore oil producers in Angola by volume. Angola has a state-owned energy sector that partners with foreign corporations, including Chevron. Angola heavily relies on this foreign investment for economic growth. These partnerships are part of bigger energy projects that have many incentives to use environmentally sound methods, and technology. Despite this, Angola has experienced severe environmental problems from these projects, especially involving Chevron. A major Chevron oil spill occurred in 2002, which polluted beaches and contaminated the marine environment. It also caused extensive harm to fishing in the region. The cause of the spill was found to have been poor maintenance of pipelines. Chevron promised to invest $180 million for new pipes, and the pipeline was shut down once the leaks were discovered. Chevron's operations in Africa were criticized as environmentally unsound by 130 Nigerian researchers, journalists, and activists. In 2002, Angola demanded $2 million in compensation for oil spills allegedly caused by Chevron, the first time it had fined a multinational corporation operating in its waters.

== United States refineries ==
=== U.S. Clean Air Act settlements ===
The United States Environmental Protection Agency, along with the United States Department of Justice, and the Mississippi Department of Environmental Quality came to a settlement with Chevron for safety improvements for all its refineries in the United States due to claims of provisions of the Clean Air Act being violated by releasing hazardous chemicals. The investigation by the EPA was initiated by a fire that occurred on August 6, 2012, that involved high-temperature hydrocarbons being released. During the investigation in 2013, two other hazardous chemical related incidents happened at separate refineries, including an explosion and a fire in Pascagoula, Mississippi, and a rupture in El Segundo, California. There were also claims made under the Comprehensive Environmental Response, Compensation and Liability Act, and the Emergency Planning Community Right-to-Know Act, which were all resolved in the same settlement action. This lawsuit was the first time the United States and a state has partnered to enforce these acts. These settlements required improvements in refinery inspections and replacement of pipes at the Richmond, CA refinery, integrity operating windows, and better emergency prevention and response training for employees.

=== Richmond, California refinery ===
The Richmond refinery paid $540,000 in 1998 for illegally bypassing waste water treatments and failing to notify the public about toxic releases. Overall, Chevron is listed as potentially liable for 95 Superfund sites, with funds set aside by the EPA for clean-up.

A 1989 explosion and fire at the refinery resulted in a $877,000 OSHA fine for "willfully failing to provide protective equipment for employees." Chevron employees had "repeatedly requested" protective equipment since the early 1980s but the company had refused despite more than 70 fires in the plant since 1984. Elizabeth Dole, the US Secretary of Labor, said: "OSHA's investigation makes clear that Chevron knew of the need for protective equipment and clothing."

On March 25, 1999, an explosion and fire at the refinery spread noxious fumes and sent hundreds of Richmond residents to hospitals.

On August 6, 2012, a large fire erupted at the refinery. Initial reports estimated that 11,000 people sought treatment at area hospitals, and later reports placed the number above 15,000 people. The company pleaded no contest to six charges in connection with the fire, and agreed to pay $2 million in fines and restitution. Around the same time the settlement was announced, the Richmond city council voted to file suit against Chevron. The reasons for the suit included "a continuation of years of neglect, lax oversight and corporate indifference to necessary safety inspection and repairs."

In February 2011, 600 gallons of oil spilled from the refinery into San Francisco Bay.

=== Pembroke Refinery ===
In 2011, an explosion in a storage tank at Chevron’s Pembroke Refinery in south-west Wales killed four and seriously injured one person. The explosion happened during a routine maintenance. In August 2011, Chevron sold the refinery to Valero Energy for $730 million. In June 2019, eight years after the explosion, Valero was fined £5 million after pleading guilty to two breaches of the Health and Safety at Work Act, following an investigation that concluded the explosion could have been avoided. Chevron agreed to pay the fine as they were the owner of the refinery at the time. B&A Contracts, a specialist cleaning company who employed two of the killed workers, was also fined £120,000 after admitting to health and safety breaches.

== NiMH battery technology for automobiles ==
Cobasys LLC was a supplier of nickel–metal hydride (NiMH) batteries, battery control systems, and packaged solutions for automotive applications, uninterruptible power supplies, telecommunications applications, and distributed power generation. For eight years ending in 2009, Cobasys was a 50–50 joint venture between California-based Chevron Corporation and Michigan-based Energy Conversion Devices, Inc. (also called ECD Ovonics, ECD, or Ovonics) The intermediary hierarchy of ownership was that Cobasys LLC was owned by Chevron's subsidiary Chevron Technology Ventures LLC, and ECD Ovonics' subsidiary Ovonic Battery Company. Cobasys spent $180 million in funding from Chevron Technology Ventures, and the two owners were unable to agree on further funding of the company. After arbitration between the owners had stalled, a buyer was found. On July 14, 2009, the sale of Cobasys to SB LiMotive Co. Ltd., an electric vehicle battery joint venture between Samsung SDI Co. Ltd. and Robert Bosch GmbH, was announced.

Sherry Boschert accused Chevron of limiting access to large NiMH batteries through its stake in Cobasys corporation and control of patent licenses to remove a competitor to gasoline. Cobasys filed a patent infringement lawsuit against Panasonic and Toyota over production of the EV-95 battery used in the Toyota RAV4 EV. The case was settled with each company granting the other a license to its patents. In her book, Plug-in Hybrids: The Cars that Will Recharge America, published in February 2007, Boschert argues that large-format NiMH batteries are commercially viable but that Cobasys refuses to sell the batteries or license the technology to small companies or individuals. Boschert argues that Cobasys accepts only very large orders for the batteries. Major automakers showed little interest in placing large orders for large-format NiMH batteries. However, Toyota complained about the difficulty in getting smaller orders of large format NiMH batteries to service the existing 825 RAV-4EVs. Because no other companies were willing to place large orders, Cobasys was not manufacturing or licensing large format NiMH battery technology for automobiles. Boschert concludes that "its possible that Cobasys (Chevron) is squelching all access to large NiMH batteries through its control of patent licenses in order to remove a competitor to gasoline. Or its possible that Cobasys simply wants the market for itself and is waiting for a major automaker to start producing plug-in hybrids or electric vehicles." In an interview with The Economist, the ECD Ovonics founder Stan Ovshinsky disagreed, stating "Cobasys isn't preventing anything. Cobasys just needs an infusion of cash. They build a great battery."

In October 2007, International Acquisitions Services and Innovative Transportation Systems filed suit against Cobasys and its parents for failure to fill an order for large-format NiMH batteries to be used in the electric Innovan. In August 2008, Mercedes-Benz U.S. International filed suit against Cobasys, on the ground Cobasys did not tender the batteries it agreed to build for Mercedes-Benz's planned hybrid SUV. The Mercedes suit was settled for $1.1 million.

== Niger Delta shootings ==
On May 28, 1998, activists staged a demonstration and took several individuals hostage on a company oil platform in the Niger Delta, Nigeria. Nigerian police and soldiers were allegedly flown in with Chevron helicopters. Soldiers shot at the activists and subsequently two activists (Jola Ogungbeje and Aroleka Irowaninu) died from their wounds. In 2007 U.S. District Judge Susan Illston, allowed a lawsuit brought by victims and victims' families against Chevron to proceed, saying that there may be evidence that Chevron had hired, supervised, and/or provided transportation to Nigerian military forces known for their "general history of committing abuses." In December 2008, a federal jury cleared Chevron of all charges brought against them in the case. Chevron had stated that the military intervention was necessary to protect the lives of its workers and considers the jury's decision vindication for the accusations of wrongdoing.

== UN sanctions ==
According to US Embassy Cable BAGHDAD 000791 the Iraqi prime minister believed that Chevron was engaged in negotiations to invest in Iran in contravention of UN sanctions. The embassy related that it had no independent confirmation of this claim. This document was intended to have been kept secret until 2029.

== Unpaid royalties ==
In 1996, Chevron, along with other companies, was sued by Harrold Wright under the False Claim Act for falsely reducing earnings from natural gas extracted on federal and Indian leases since 1988 in order to reduce royalty payments. The lawsuit was settled a year after Wright died in 2008 by a payment of $45.5 million from Chevron. The payment also settled the lawsuit of Texaco and Unocal, which were bought by Chevron after the suit was filed.

== Oil spill off the coast of Rio de Janeiro in 2011 ==
The Campos Basin in Brazil is an important offshore oil reserve, and has been the site of extensive oil exploration and extraction since 1968. This region also has geographic traits that make it prone to oil spills. These traits include intense atmospheric conditions such as cyclones, and high velocity currents. Oil spills from drilling platforms in shallow water causes high impacts on marine life, including bioaccumulation. Due to these spills, there studies that show polycyclic aromatic hydrocarbons contamination along the coast. On November 8, 2011, Chevron came under fire by Brazilian authorities for its role in the spill of crude oil off of the southeastern coast of Brazil. The Brazilian regulators said 416,400 liters of oil leaked over the course of two weeks from undersea rock near the well in the Frade oil project 370 km off the Brazilian coast. Prosecutors in Brazil initially demanded $10.6bn in the subsequent lawsuit. This was Brazil's largest environmental prosecution to date. The National Petroleum Agency (ANP) suspended Chevron's activities in Brazil until it identified the cause of an oil spill off the coast of Rio de Janeiro.

The National Petroleum Agency later concluded that the spill did not cause significant economic damage, injured no one, and never approached Brazil's coast. Criminal charges were dropped and the lawsuits were settled for a total of $130 million.

== KS Endeavor explosion ==
The KS Endeavor jackup rig exploded on January 16, 2012, while drilling an exploration well for Chevron in the Funiwa field in Nigeria. The explosion resulted in the death of two of the 154 workers on board and a fire that burned for 46 days before the well was sealed on June 18. According to a Reuters news report, workers on the KS Endeavor were ignored by Chevron when they requested evacuation due to concerns of increasing smoke billowing from the drilling borehole. A senior worker said the blowout was triggered by a massive build-up of pressure. A witness said that rig engineers advised Chevron to stop drilling and evacuate staff but Chevron told them to continue with drilling. Expecting an explosion, the rig manager, one of the two that later died, kept the lifeboats at hand and ready for use. A witness reported: "This is the reason so many of us survived because we were all aware that it was going to happen, but just didn't know when." In an email response to Reuters, Chevron said it did not receive requests to evacuate the rig and that staff on board had the right to call a halt to work if they believed conditions were unsafe.

== Polish gas exploration ==
Chevron has experienced protests aimed at the company by local communities in Southern Poland when they started gas exploration in the region. Their complaint is that Chevron did not provide all of the documents required for gas exploration in Poland, and that the company has not promised to share a percentage of the revenues with the local landholders. The landholders of the region view Chevron's presence in the region negatively since they may be forced to sell their properties at a low cost if gas is discovered in the region. As well, potential environmental disasters are a concern for local farmers. Another of the residents' primary concerns is water pollution from the chemicals used in fracking. In response to some of the protests, Chevron has sued some of the protesters from Żurawlów for disrupting their operations.

According to gas and oil expert Andrzej Szczesniak, one of the main reasons for the protest is the difference between Polish and American law. In the USA property owners typically receive 15–20% from the income of gas exploration. In Poland, the discovery of gas on private property usually results in a forced sale of the property, with the owner receiving only the prior value of the land and no percentage of the gas revenue. This is the result of outdated, Communist Era laws that are still on the books and which are often exploited by municipal governments if they can get a 'kick back' from a larger company.

== Argentina agreement and protests ==
After the 2012 decision of the Argentine government to regain control of the biggest oil company of the country, YPF, the search for foreign investors for exploitation of unconventional oil started. Finally in 2013, YPF and Chevron signed an agreement for the Vaca Muerta oil field, the world's second-largest shale gas deposit. In August 2013, the Congress of Neuquén province approved the agreement, while between 5,000 and 10,000 workers, students and indigenous people protested outside the legislature. Police fired rubber bullets, hitting some protesters. Governor Jorge Sapag defended the police actions: "The march was generally peaceful, but about 100 people separated from the rest and attacked the police. The police acted with seriousness and professionalism."

== Public Eye Lifetime Award ==
In 2015, Chevron received the Lifetime Award of the Public Eye on Davos for what the sponsors called Chevron's responsibility for environmental disaster in the Amazon. The same group cited the company in 2006 in the category "Environment" for oil soiling in the Amazonas in Ecuador. A Chevron spokesperson commented that the award was "nothing more than a stunt to distract attention from the fact that the lawsuit against Chevron in Ecuador has been proven to be meritless and the product of unprecedented fraud" and pointed to a U.S. court finding that the plaintiff's lawyers had committed "mail and wire fraud, money laundering, witness tampering and obstruction of justice." That controversial RICO case is under appeal and has been criticized by environmental and human rights groups.

== Global warming and carbon footprint ==
In a letter Chevron Corp. argued that under current disclosure rules companies are already required to disclose material risks including climate-change risk, during part of the U.S. Securities and Exchange Commission's consultation process, noting that its "2015 Form 10-K included a significant discussion of the potential risks of additional greenhouse gas emissions regulation following the outcome of the Paris Accord."

Chevron was found to have contributed 43.35bn tonnes of CO_{2} equivalent since 1965 in an analysis made by the Climate Accountability Institute.

Chevron reported Total CO2e emissions (Direct + Indirect) for the twelve months ending December 31, 2020, at 58,000 Kt (-6,000 /-9.4% y-o-y).

Chevron's annual Total CO2e Emissions - Market-Based Scope 1 + Scope 2 (in kilotonnes)
Dec 2014	Dec 2015	Dec 2016	Dec 2017	Dec 2018	Dec 2019	Dec 2020
61,000	61,000	67,000	66,000	69,000	64,000	58,000

In October 2021 the company adopted an aspirational net zero target by 2050 and pledged to cut the overall carbon intensity of its products by 5%, by 2028 including scope 3 emissions. A group of investors demanded from the company to cut emissions and said in response to the announcement: " Rather than a 5% reduction in Scope 3 intensity, absolute emissions need to come down by 40% by 2030 to have any chance of achieving the 2016 Paris Agreement"

In December 2022, U.S. House Oversight and Reform Committee Chair Carolyn Maloney and U.S. House Oversight Environment Subcommittee Chair Ro Khanna sent a memorandum to all House Oversight and Reform Committee members summarizing additional findings from the Committee's investigation into the fossil fuel industry disinformation campaign to obscure the role of fossil fuels in causing global warming, and that upon reviewing internal company documents, accused Chevron along with BP, ExxonMobil, and Shell of greenwashing their Paris Agreement carbon neutrality pledges while continuing long-term investment in fossil fuel production and sales, for engaging in a campaign to promote the use of natural gas as a clean energy source and bridge fuel to renewable energy, and of intimidating journalists reporting about the companies' climate actions and of obstructing the Committee's investigation.

== 2023 stock buybacks ==
Chevron announced in late January 2023, amidst record profits and revenues for most large oil companies due to the 2022 Russian invasion of Ukraine, that the company would begin a $75 billion stock buyback program on April 1 with no set expiration date. The oil giant simultaneously announced it would raise its dividend by 6 percent, from $1.42 per share to $1.51 per share; both of these announcements rallied Chevron's stock price an additional 2 percent in after hours trading during the day.

These announcements earned Chevron intense criticism from the Biden administration, with White House spokesperson Abdullah Hasan stating "For a company that claimed not too long ago that it was ‘working hard’ to increase oil production, handing out $75 billion to executives and wealthy shareholders sure is an odd way to show it." The White House additionally reiterated calls for Chevron and other oil companies to use its earnings to increase oil supply and reduce costs for the American people.

== See also ==
- Criticism of ExxonMobil
- Lago Agrio oil field
- Steven Donziger
