= Tuczępy =

Tuczępy may refer to the following places:

- Tuczępy, Greater Poland Voivodeship (west-central Poland)
- Tuczępy, Lublin Voivodeship (east Poland)
- Tuczępy, Świętokrzyskie Voivodeship (south-central Poland)
- Tuczępy, Strzelce-Drezdenko County in Lubusz Voivodeship (west Poland)
