= Koniuchy =

Koniuchy may refer to:

- Kaniūkai, village in Lithuania, former Koniuchy in Poland, site of the Koniuchy massacre in 1944
- Koniuchy, Lublin Voivodeship (east Poland)
- Koniuchy, a district of Toruń, Poland
- Koniukhy, Ukraine, formerly Koniuchy
