= Majdan Tuczępski =

- Village
- Location within Poland
- Coordinates: 50°52′N 23°30′E
- Country: Poland
- Voivodeship: Lublin
- County: Zamość
- Gmina: Grabowiec

Majdan Tuczępski (Polish pronunciation: [ˈmajdan tuˈtʂɛmpskʲi]) is a village in the administrative district of Gmina Grabowiec, within Zamość County, Lublin Voivodeship, in eastern Poland.
