= Horyszów-Kolonia =

- Village
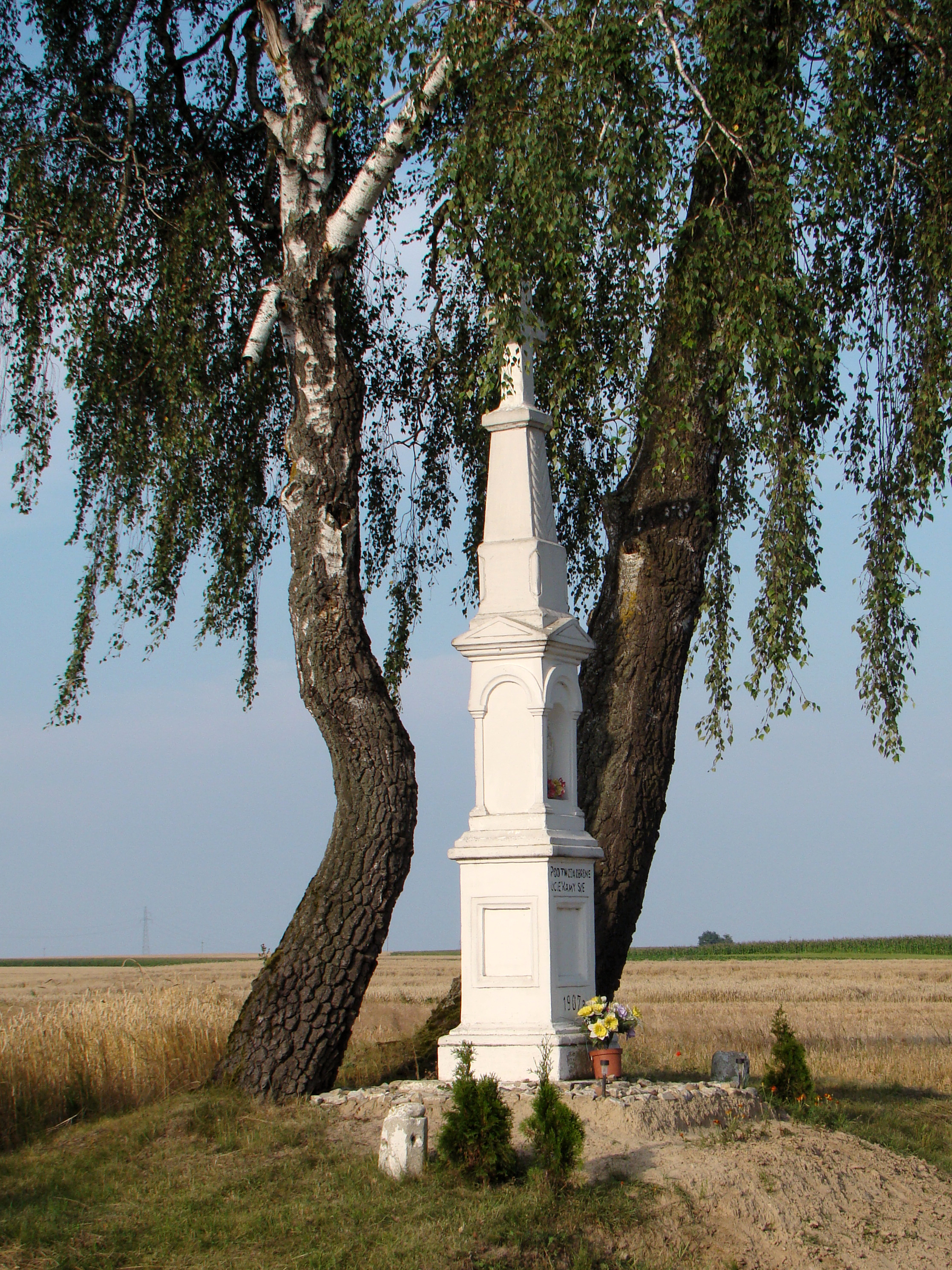

- Location within Poland
- Coordinates: 50°44′44″N 23°38′20″E
- Country: Poland
- Voivodeship: Lublin
- County: Zamość
- Gmina: Miączyn

Horyszów-Kolonia (Polish pronunciation: [xɔˈrɨʂuf kɔˈlɔɲa]) is a village in the administrative district of Gmina Miączyn, within Zamość County, Lublin Voivodeship, in eastern Poland.
