= Frankamionka =

- Village
- Location within Poland
- Coordinates: 50°44′N 23°39′E
- Country: Poland
- Voivodeship: Lublin
- County: Zamość
- Gmina: Miączyn
- Time zone: UTC+1 (CET)
  - Summer (DST): UTC+2 (CEST)

Frankamionka [frankaˈmjɔnka] is a village in the administrative district of Gmina Miączyn, within Zamość County, Lublin Voivodeship, in eastern Poland.

== History ==
16 Polish citizens were murdered by Nazi Germany in the village during World War II.
