= Żuków, Zamość County =

Żuków
- Village
- Location within Poland
- Coordinates: 50°47′N 23°28′E
- Country: Poland
- Voivodeship: Lublin
- County: Zamość
- Gmina: Miączyn

Żuków [ˈʐukuf] is a village in the administrative district of Gmina Miączyn, within Zamość County, Lublin Voivodeship, in eastern Poland.
