= Siedlisko, Lublin Voivodeship =

Siedlisko
- Village
- Location within Poland
- Coordinates: 50°49′02″N 23°32′01″E
- Country: Poland
- Voivodeship: Lublin
- County: Zamość
- Gmina: Grabowiec

Siedlisko [ɕɛdˈliskɔ] is a village in the administrative district of Gmina Grabowiec, within Zamość County, Lublin Voivodeship, in eastern Poland.
