= Rogow (surname) =

Rogow is a surname. Notable people with this surname include:

- Roberta Rogow (born 1942), American fiction writer and singer
- Sally Rogow (1930–2012), American teacher
- Stan Rogow (1948–2023), American film and television producer
- Zack Rogow, American poet and playwright
