= Gdeszyn =

- Village
- Location within Poland
- Coordinates: 50°47′N 23°39′E
- Country: Poland
- Voivodeship: Lublin
- County: Zamość
- Gmina: Miączyn

Gdeszyn [ˈɡdɛʂɨn] is a village in the administrative district of Gmina Miączyn, within Zamość County, Lublin Voivodeship, in eastern Poland.
