= Ornatowice-Kolonia =

- Village
- Location within Poland
- Coordinates: 50°51′31″N 23°36′06″E
- Country: Poland
- Voivodeship: Lublin
- County: Zamość
- Gmina: Grabowiec

Ornatowice-Kolonia [ɔrnatɔˈvit͡sɛ kɔˈlɔɲa] is a village in the administrative district of Gmina Grabowiec, within Zamość County, Lublin Voivodeship, in eastern Poland.
