= Miączyn-Kolonia =

- Village
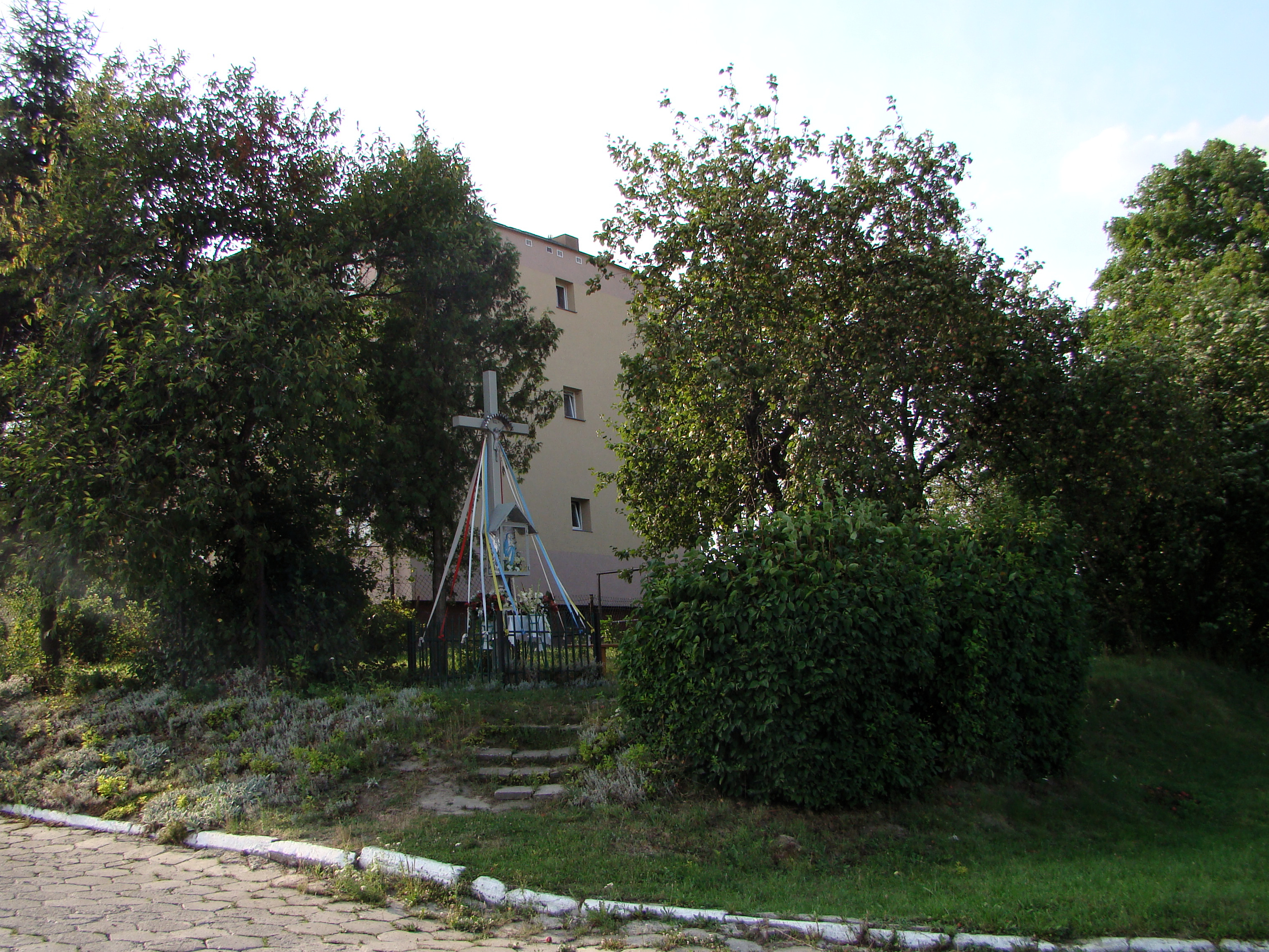
- Wayside cross in Miączyn-Kolonia

- Location within Poland
- Coordinates: 50°44′56″N 23°31′30″E
- Country: Poland
- Voivodeship: Lublin
- County: Zamość
- Gmina: Miączyn

Miączyn-Kolonia [ˈmjɔnt͡ʂɨn kɔˈlɔɲa] is a village in the administrative district of Gmina Miączyn, within Zamość County, Lublin Voivodeship, in eastern Poland.
