= Niewirków =

- Village
- Location within Poland
- Coordinates: 50°42′N 23°31′E
- Country: Poland
- Voivodeship: Lublin
- County: Zamość
- Gmina: Miączyn

Niewirków [ɲɛˈvirkuf] is a village in the administrative district of Gmina Miączyn, within Zamość County, Lublin Voivodeship, in eastern Poland.
