= Zawalów =

- Village
- Location within Poland
- Coordinates: 50°45′N 23°33′E
- Country: Poland
- Voivodeship: Lublin
- County: Zamość
- Gmina: Miączyn

Zawalów [zaˈvaluf] is a village in the administrative district of Gmina Miączyn, within Zamość County, Lublin Voivodeship, in eastern Poland.
