= Cieszyn, Lublin Voivodeship =

Cieszyn
- Village
- Location within Poland
- Coordinates: 50°49′N 23°28′E
- Country: Poland
- Voivodeship: Lublin
- County: Zamość
- Gmina: Grabowiec
- Time zone: UTC+1 (CET)
  - Summer (DST): UTC+2 (CEST)

Cieszyn (Polish pronunciation: [ˈt͡ɕɛʂɨn]) is a village in the administrative district of Gmina Grabowiec, within Zamość County, Lublin Voivodeship, in eastern Poland.

== History ==
Three Polish citizens were murdered by Nazi Germany in the village during World War II.
