= Ministrówka =

- Village
- Location within Poland
- Coordinates: 50°45′N 23°29′E
- Country: Poland
- Voivodeship: Lublin
- County: Zamość
- Gmina: Miączyn

Ministrówka [minisˈtrufka] is a village in the administrative district of Gmina Miączyn, within Zamość County, Lublin Voivodeship, in eastern Poland.
