= Bereść =

- Village
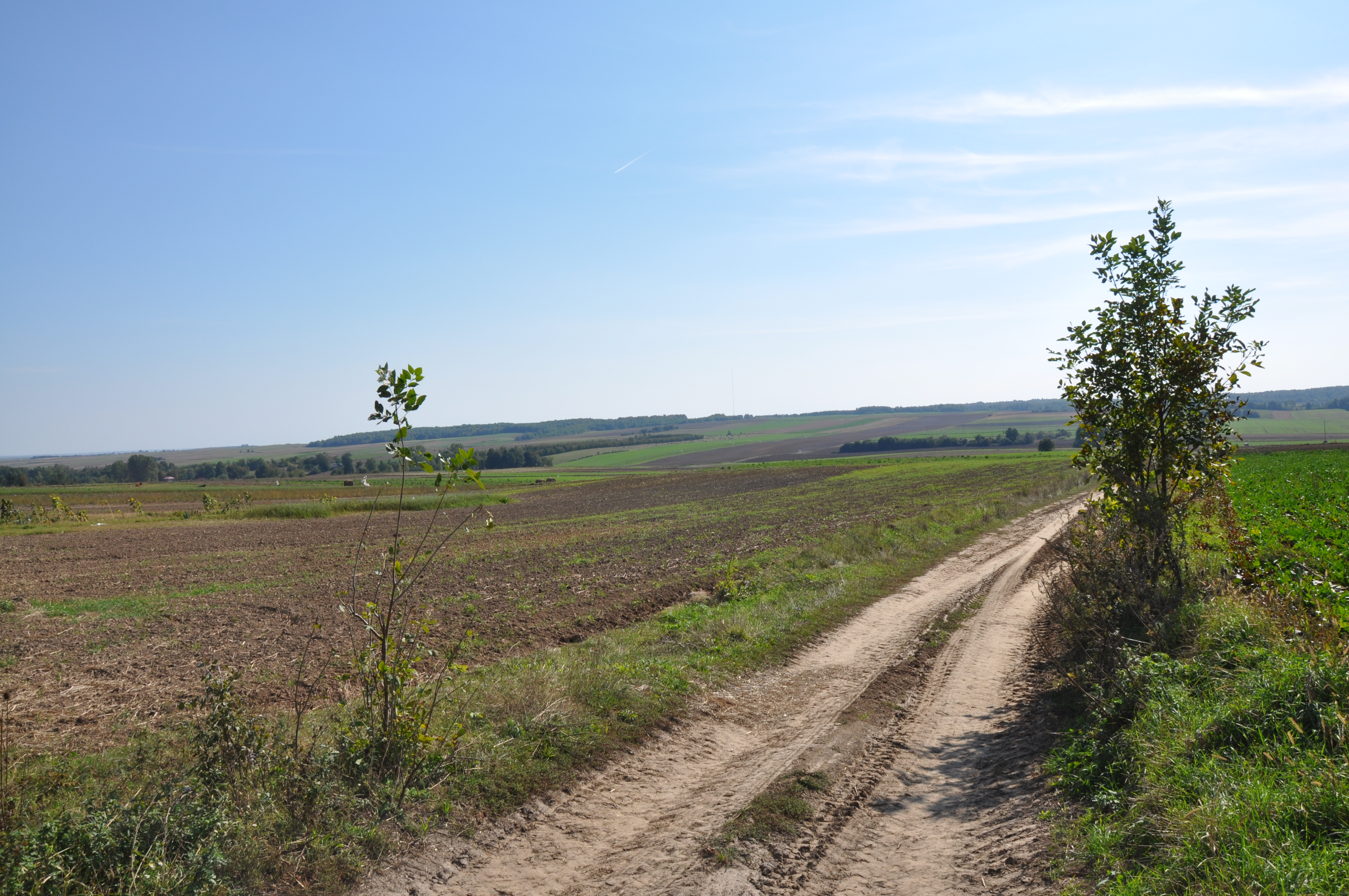

- Location within Poland
- Coordinates: 50°48′N 23°37′E
- Country: Poland
- Voivodeship: Lublin
- County: Zamość
- Gmina: Grabowiec
- Time zone: UTC+1 (CET)
  - Summer (DST): UTC+2 (CEST)

Bereść [ˈbɛrɛɕt͡ɕ] is a village in the administrative district of Gmina Grabowiec, in Zamość County, Lublin Voivodeship, in eastern Poland, approximately 27 km (17 mi) east of Zamość and 89 km (55 mi) southeast of the regional capital Lublin.

== History ==
Seven Polish citizens were murdered by Nazi Germany in the village during World War II.
