= Skibice, Lublin Voivodeship =

Skibice
- Village
- Location within Poland
- Coordinates: 50°51′N 23°39′E
- Country: Poland
- Voivodeship: Lublin
- County: Zamość
- Gmina: Grabowiec

Skibice [skiˈbit͡sɛ] is a village in the administrative district of Gmina Grabowiec, within Zamość County, Lublin Voivodeship, in eastern Poland.
