= Miączyn-Stacja =

- Village
- Location within Poland
- Coordinates: 50°43′59″N 23°35′51″E
- Country: Poland
- Voivodeship: Lublin
- County: Zamość
- Gmina: Miączyn

Miączyn-Stacja [ˈmjɔnt͡ʂɨn ˈstat͡sja] is a village in the administrative district of Gmina Miączyn, within Zamość County, Lublin Voivodeship, in eastern Poland.
