= Grabowiec-Góra =

- Village
- Location within Poland
- Coordinates: 50°48′47″N 23°32′52″E
- Country: Poland
- Voivodeship: Lublin
- County: Zamość
- Gmina: Grabowiec
- Population: 650

Grabowiec-Góra [ɡraˈbɔvjɛt͡s ˈɡura] is a village in the administrative district of Gmina Grabowiec, within Zamość County, Lublin Voivodeship, in eastern Poland.
