= Bronisławka, Zamość County =

Bronisławka
- Village
- Location within Poland
- Coordinates: 50°49′14″N 23°33′48″E
- Country: Poland
- Voivodeship: Lublin
- County: Zamość
- Gmina: Grabowiec

Bronisławka [brɔniˈswafka] is a village in the administrative district of Gmina Grabowiec, within Zamość County, Lublin Voivodeship, in eastern Poland.
