= Szystowice =

- Village
- Location within Poland
- Coordinates: 50°50′N 23°36′E
- Country: Poland
- Voivodeship: Lublin
- County: Zamość
- Gmina: Grabowiec

Szystowice [ʂɨstɔˈvit͡sɛ] is a village in the administrative district of Gmina Grabowiec, within Zamość County, Lublin Voivodeship, in eastern Poland.
