= Czartoria, Lublin Voivodeship =

Czartoria
- Village
- Location within Poland
- Coordinates: 50°46′N 23°32′E
- Country: Poland
- Voivodeship: Lublin
- County: Zamość
- Gmina: Miączyn

Czartoria [t͡ʂarˈtɔrja] is a village in the administrative district of Gmina Miączyn, within Zamość County, Lublin Voivodeship, in eastern Poland.
