= Wolica Uchańska =

- Village
- Location within Poland
- Coordinates: 50°50′N 23°28′E
- Country: Poland
- Voivodeship: Lublin
- County: Zamość
- Gmina: Grabowiec

Wolica Uchańska [vɔˈlit͡sa uˈxaɲska] is a village in the administrative district of Gmina Grabowiec, within Zamość County, Lublin Voivodeship, in eastern Poland.
