= Zawalów-Kolonia =

- Village
- Location within Poland
- Coordinates: 50°44′08″N 23°31′56″E
- Country: Poland
- Voivodeship: Lublin
- County: Zamość
- Gmina: Miączyn

Zawalów-Kolonia [zaˈvaluf kɔˈlɔɲa] is a village in the administrative district of Gmina Miączyn, within Zamość County, Lublin Voivodeship, in eastern Poland.
