= Hołużne =

- Village
- Location within Poland
- Coordinates: 50°52′2″N 23°34′13″E
- Country: Poland
- Voivodeship: Lublin
- County: Zamość
- Gmina: Grabowiec
- Population: 140

Hołużne [xɔˈwuʐnɛ] is a village in the administrative district of Gmina Grabowiec, within Zamość County, Lublin Voivodeship, in eastern Poland.
