= Gdeszyn-Kolonia =

- Village
- Location within Poland
- Coordinates: 50°46′12″N 23°37′59″E
- Country: Poland
- Voivodeship: Lublin
- County: Zamość
- Gmina: Miączyn

Gdeszyn-Kolonia [ˈɡdɛʂɨn kɔˈlɔɲa] is a village in the administrative district of Gmina Miączyn, within Zamość County, Lublin Voivodeship, in eastern Poland.
