= Wólka Tuczępska =

- Village
- Location within Poland
- Coordinates: 50°53′N 23°32′E
- Country: Poland
- Voivodeship: Lublin
- County: Zamość
- Gmina: Grabowiec

Wólka Tuczępska [ˈvulka tuˈt͡ʂɛmpska] is a village in the administrative district of Gmina Grabowiec, within Zamość County, Lublin Voivodeship, in eastern Poland.
