= Niewirków-Kolonia =

- Village
- Location within Poland
- Coordinates: 50°41′59″N 23°28′52″E
- Country: Poland
- Voivodeship: Lublin
- County: Zamość
- Gmina: Miączyn

Niewirków-Kolonia [ɲɛˈvirkuf kɔˈlɔɲa] is a village in the administrative district of Gmina Miączyn, within Zamość County, Lublin Voivodeship, in eastern Poland.
