= Kotlice-Kolonia =

- Village
- Location within Poland
- Coordinates: 50°41′N 23°36′E
- Country: Poland
- Voivodeship: Lublin
- County: Zamość
- Gmina: Miączyn
- Population: 103

Kotlice-Kolonia [kɔˈtlit͡sɛ kɔˈlɔɲa] is a village in the administrative district of Gmina Miączyn, within Zamość County, Lublin Voivodeship, in eastern Poland.

In 2005 the village had a population of 103.
