= Gmina Grabowiec =

Gmina Grabowiec Grabowiec Commune
- Gmina
- Coat of arms
- Interactive map of Gmina Grabowiec
- Coordinates (Grabowiec): 50°49′16″N 23°32′48″E
- Country: Poland
- Voivodeship: Lublin
- County: Zamość County
- Seat: Grabowiec

Area
  - Total: 128.88 km^{2} (49.76 sq mi)

Population (2013)
  - Total: 4,289
  - Density: 33.28/km^{2} (86.19/sq mi)
- Website: http://www.grabowiec.pl

Gmina Grabowiec is a rural gmina (administrative district) in Zamość County, Lublin Voivodeship, in eastern Poland. Its seat is the village of Grabowiec, which lies approximately 24 kilometres (15 mi) north-east of Zamość and 84 km (52 mi) south-east of the regional capital Lublin.

The gmina covers an area of 128.88 square kilometres (49.8 sq mi), and as of 2006 its total population was 4,593 (4,289 in 2013).

The gmina contains part of the protected area called Skierbieszów Landscape Park.

== Villages ==
Gmina Grabowiec contains the villages and settlements of Bereść, Bronisławka, Cieszyn, Czechówka, Dańczypol, Grabowczyk, Grabowiec, Grabowiec-Góra, Henrykówka, Hołużne, Majdan Tuczępski, Ornatowice, Ornatowice-Kolonia, Rogów, Siedlisko, Skibice, Skomorochy Duże, Skomorochy Małe, Szczelatyn, Szystowice, Tuczępy, Wolica Uchańska, Wólka Tuczępska and Żurawlów.

== Neighbouring gminas ==
Gmina Grabowiec is bordered by the gminas of Kraśniczyn, Miączyn, Sitno, Skierbieszów, Trzeszczany, Uchanie and Wojsławice.
