= Czechówka, Lublin Voivodeship =

Czechówka
- Village
- Location within Poland
- Coordinates: 50°51′33″N 23°32′33″E
- Country: Poland
- Voivodeship: Lublin
- County: Zamość
- Gmina: Grabowiec
- Population: 116

Czechówka [t͡ʂɛˈxufka] is a village in the administrative district of Gmina Grabowiec, within Zamość County, Lublin Voivodeship, in eastern Poland.
