= Gmina Miączyn =

Gmina Miączyn Miączyn Commune
- Gmina
- Coat of arms
- Interactive map of Gmina Miączyn
- Coordinates (Miączyn): 50°44′17″N 23°30′9″E
- Country: Poland
- Voivodeship: Lublin
- County: Zamość County
- Seat: Miączyn

Area
  - Total: 155.91 km^{2} (60.20 sq mi)

Population (2013)
  - Total: 6,082
  - Density: 39.01/km^{2} (101.0/sq mi)
- Website: http://www.miaczyn.pl

Gmina Miączyn is a rural gmina (administrative district) in Zamość County, Lublin Voivodeship, in eastern Poland. Its seat is the village of Miączyn, which lies approximately 18 kilometres (11 mi) east of Zamość and 87 km (54 mi) south-east of the regional capital Lublin.

The gmina covers an area of 155.91 square kilometres (60.2 sq mi), and as of 2006 its total population is 6,281 (6,082 in 2013).

The gmina contains part of the protected area called Skierbieszów Landscape Park.

== Villages ==
Gmina Miączyn contains the villages and settlements of Czartoria, Frankamionka, Gdeszyn, Gdeszyn-Kolonia, Horyszów, Horyszów-Kolonia, Koniuchy, Koniuchy-Kolonia, Kotlice, Kotlice-Kolonia, Miączyn, Miączyn-Kolonia, Miączyn-Stacja, Ministrówka, Niewirków, Niewirków-Kolonia, Poddąbrowa, Podkotlice, Świdniki, Zawalów, Zawalów-Kolonia and Żuków.

== Neighbouring gminas ==
Gmina Miączyn is bordered by the gminas of Grabowiec, Komarów-Osada, Sitno, Trzeszczany, Tyszowce and Werbkowice.
