= Allison v. ExxonMobil Corp. =

- Court: Maryland District Court; Baltimore County Circuit Court
- Full case name: Allison, et al. v. Exxon Mobil Corp.
- Decided: June 29, 2011
- Citation: 03–C–07–003809

Case history
- Appealed to: Maryland Court of Appeals (2013)
- Subsequent action: Reversal of damage awards

Ruling
- $497 million in compensatory damages, approximately $1.0 billion in punitive damages

The Jacksonville, Maryland, ExxonMobil gas leak cases were a series of lawsuits against ExxonMobil as a result of a February 2006 underground gasoline leak from an ExxonMobil service station in Jacksonville, Maryland.

== Case history ==
In February 2006, nearly 26,000 gallons of gasoline leaked from a Jacksonville, Maryland, ExxonMobil station over a period of 37 days. Nearly 300 plaintiffs subsequently sued for over $1 billion for the contamination of their wells, loss of property value, physical and mental harm. The case put a spotlight on MTBE, a gasoline additive known to cause cancer in laboratory rats. Additionally, the lawsuits alleged ExxonMobil of fraud, a charge eligible for punitive damages if found guilty.

A first lawsuit was represented by Snyder, Weltchek, and Snyder. The fraud alleged in this suit was ExxonMobil's actions of intentional malice through their effective non-action in stopping the leak and providing adequate monitoring to prevent the spill.

Another large group of plaintiffs were represented by The Law Offices of Peter Angelos. In July 2011, the Angelos plaintiffs were awarded, in sum, half a billion dollars in compensatory damages and another 1.5 billion dollars in punitive damages for fraud. The fraud finding involved Exxon's failure to install a promised "bathtub" design to catch potential leaking gas, and then a subsequent failure to disclose that the "bathtub" liner was not in place. There was also a dispute as to when Exxon knew of the leak, and whether they first told the public the station was"closed for renovations" rather than disclosing the issue. ExxonMobil has appealed this ruling. On February 26, 2013, the Maryland Court of Appeals threw out much of the damages, including all of the $1 billion punitive damages and some of the $650 million compensatory damages. The court also ruled that new trials were needed in the case.

Additional lawsuits have been filed by individual families.

== Case resolution ==
- In March 2009, a Baltimore County, Maryland, jury awarded the nearly 300 plaintiffs $150 million. The awards consisted of $300,000–$1,000,000+ for the value of their homes, $4,000–500,000 for medical expenses or monitoring depending on family size and age of its members, and an average of $1 million for emotional stress. The medical monitoring will test for four types of cancer annually. As with the other case, the Maryland Court of appeals threw out much of the damages and ordered a new trial.
- ExxonMobil has appealed the damaged award amount, claiming the high value of the award is inconsistent with the actual value of the harm done by the spill and is more reflective of a roundabout way of awarding punitive damages.
- In 2008, ExxonMobil settled with the State of Maryland for $4 million for cleanup, with a possible $1 million additional fine if they do not adhere to the clean-up schedule. ExxonMobil states it has spent over $38 million as of 2009 for clean-up efforts. The entire clean-up process could take a decade or more.
