= Żurawlów =

- Village
- Location within Poland
- Coordinates: 50°49′N 23°29′E
- Country: Poland
- Voivodeship: Lublin
- County: Zamość
- Gmina: Grabowiec

Żurawlów [ʐuˈravluf] is a village in the administrative district of Gmina Grabowiec, within Zamość County, Lublin Voivodeship, in eastern Poland.

== Chevron protest ==
In the summer of 2013, Żurawlów became the site of a protest against the American oil company Chevron, as activists identifying as "Occupy Chevron" occupied an oil field near the town where Chevron planned to drill an exploratory well for shale gas.
