= Tuczępy, Lublin Voivodeship =

Tuczępy
- Village
- Location within Poland
- Coordinates: 50°52′30″N 23°31′46″E
- Country: Poland
- Voivodeship: Lublin
- County: Zamość
- Gmina: Grabowiec

Tuczępy [tuˈt͡ʂɛmpɨ] is a village in the administrative district of Gmina Grabowiec, within Zamość County, Lublin Voivodeship, in eastern Poland.
