= Koniuchy, Lublin Voivodeship =

Koniuchy
- Village
- Location within Poland
- Coordinates: 50°44′N 23°37′E
- Country: Poland
- Voivodeship: Lublin
- County: Zamość
- Gmina: Miączyn

Population
  - Total: 480

Koniuchy [kɔˈɲuxɨ] is a village in the administrative district of Gmina Miączyn, within Zamość County, Lublin Voivodeship, in eastern Poland.
