= Miączyn, Lublin Voivodeship =

Miączyn
- Village
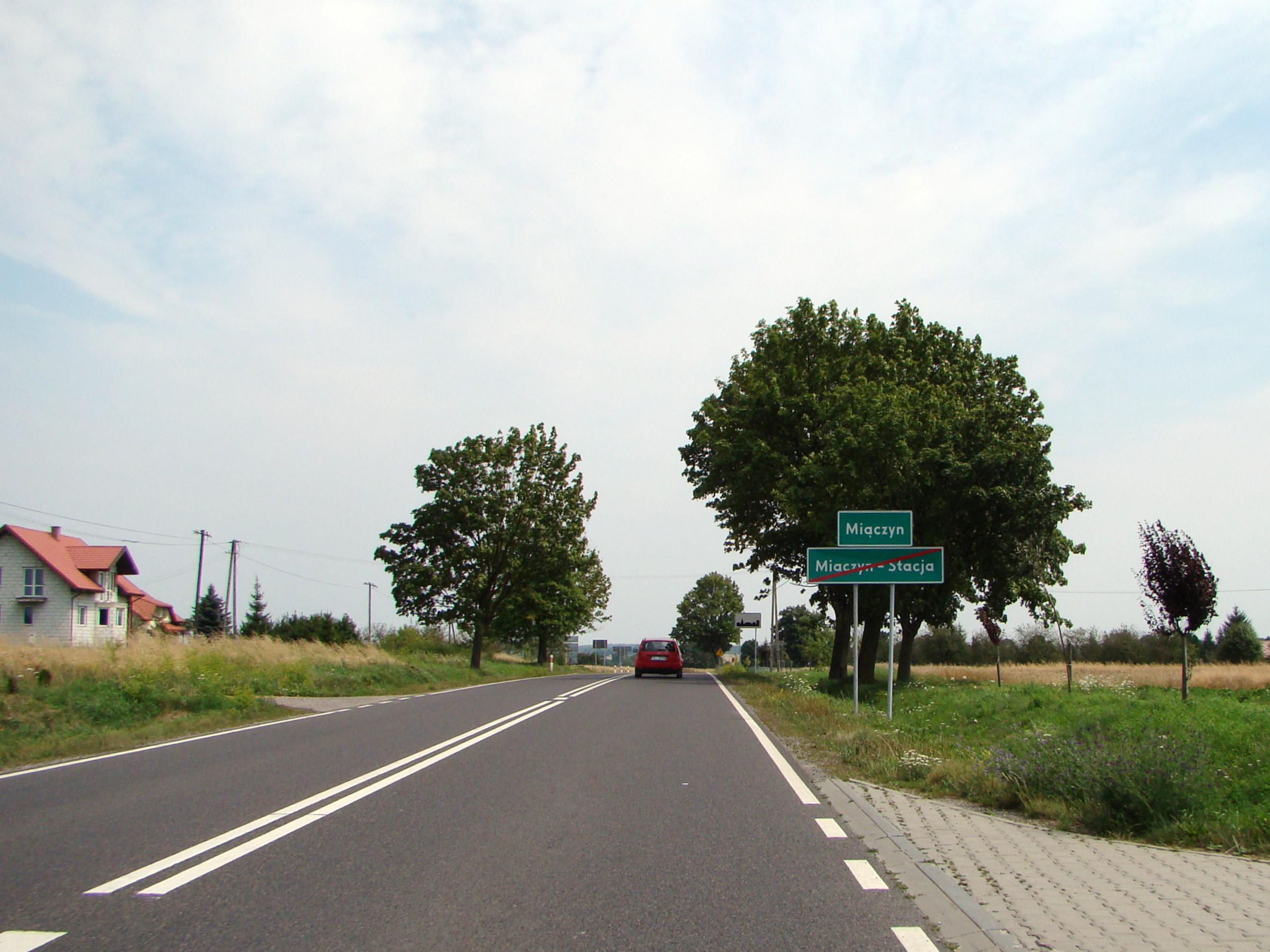
- Entering Miączyn

- Location within Poland
- Coordinates: 50°44′17″N 23°30′9″E
- Country: Poland
- Voivodeship: Lublin
- County: Zamość
- Gmina: Miączyn
- Population: 749

Miączyn ([ˈmjɔnt͡ʂɨn]) is a village in Zamość County, Lublin Voivodeship, in eastern Poland. It is the seat of the gmina (administrative district) called Gmina Miączyn.
