= Sally Rogow =

American educator

- Born: Sally Muriel Levine; May 9, 1930; Brooklyn, New York, United States
- Died: December 21, 2012 (aged 82); Vancouver, British Columbia, Canada
- Other names: Sally Muriel Rogow, Sally M. Rogow
- Occupation: educator
- Known for: works on educating the visually impaired

Sally Rogow (May 9, 1930 – December 21, 2012) was an American educator who developed programs to assist other teachers in schooling the visually impaired. After completing her education with a bachelor's and two master's degrees in the United States, as well as a teaching stint at the Michigan School for the Blind, Rogow moved to Canada where she earned a doctorate in special education. She was hired by the University of British Columbia to develop a normal school program for educators of those with multiple handicaps or visual impairment. Launching the program in 1971, Rogow directed it until 1995, publishing numerous works on teaching people with disabilities.

== Early life ==
Sally Muriel Levine was born on May 9, 1930, in Brooklyn, New York to May (née Weinberger) and Gustave M. Levine. Her father was an optometrist and she was raised with her younger brother Aaron, who would become a medical malpractice attorney. Levine attended Brooklyn College and went on to further her studies at the University of Wisconsin, where she graduated in 1951. While in Wisconsin, she met Robert Rogow, whom she married in 1950 in Brooklyn and subsequently the couple had two daughters, Fern and Andrea. Rogow continued her education at Columbia University, earning a master's degree in anthropology in 1953. When her husband was offered a post at Michigan State University, the family relocated and she completed a second master's degree in education.

== Career ==
Rogow taught at the Michigan School for the Blind in Lansing between 1964 and 1966, before moving in the latter year to Vancouver, British Columbia, Canada. She began teaching at the Simon Fraser University in 1966. Simultaneously with her teaching, Rogow enrolled in doctoral studies in Special Education at the University of British Columbia (UBC), completing her degree and her tenure at Simon Fraser in 1971. Upon completion of her PhD, she was hired by UBC in 1971 to establish and direct a program to train teachers to teach students who were multi-disabled or visually impaired. Initially the curricula offered teaching diplomas and later, was accredited as a master's degree program. She remained as director of this program until her 1995 retirement.

Rogow published over forty studies in teaching children with disabilities and language development. Some of her publications include: "Public Education for Blind Children" (Education Canada, Summer 1975), "The Right to an Equal Education: Is It Happening for Blind Children in Canada?" (Education Canada, Fall 1976), Their Special Needs: an Action Guide to Working with Blind Residents of Mental Retardation Facilities (1977) "Mainstreaming: It Can Work for Blind Children" (Education Canada, Summer 1978), Helping the Visually Impaired Child with Developmental Problems (1988) and Language, Literacy and Children with Special Needs (1997). She also wrote several books directed at youth education regarding the Holocaust.

Upon her retirement from UBC, Rogow joined The Person Within, a project aimed at eliminating abuse and neglect of disabled people. In 2009, she received the Distinguished Service Award from the Canadian Vision Teachers Conference. In 2011, she was inducted into the Hall of Fame for Leaders and Legends of the Blindness Field by the American Printing House for the Blind and she was recognized for her charitable works by Jewish Women International. The last years of her life, she lived at the Weinberg Residence, a facility in Vancouver for Jewish senior citizens.

== Death and legacy ==
Rogow died on December 21, 2012, and was buried in the Schara Tzedek Cemetery.
