= Battle of Osuchy =

1944 battle of Operation Tempest during World War II

Coordinates: 50°24′05″N 22°57′41″E

- Part of Operation Tempest in the Eastern Front of World War II
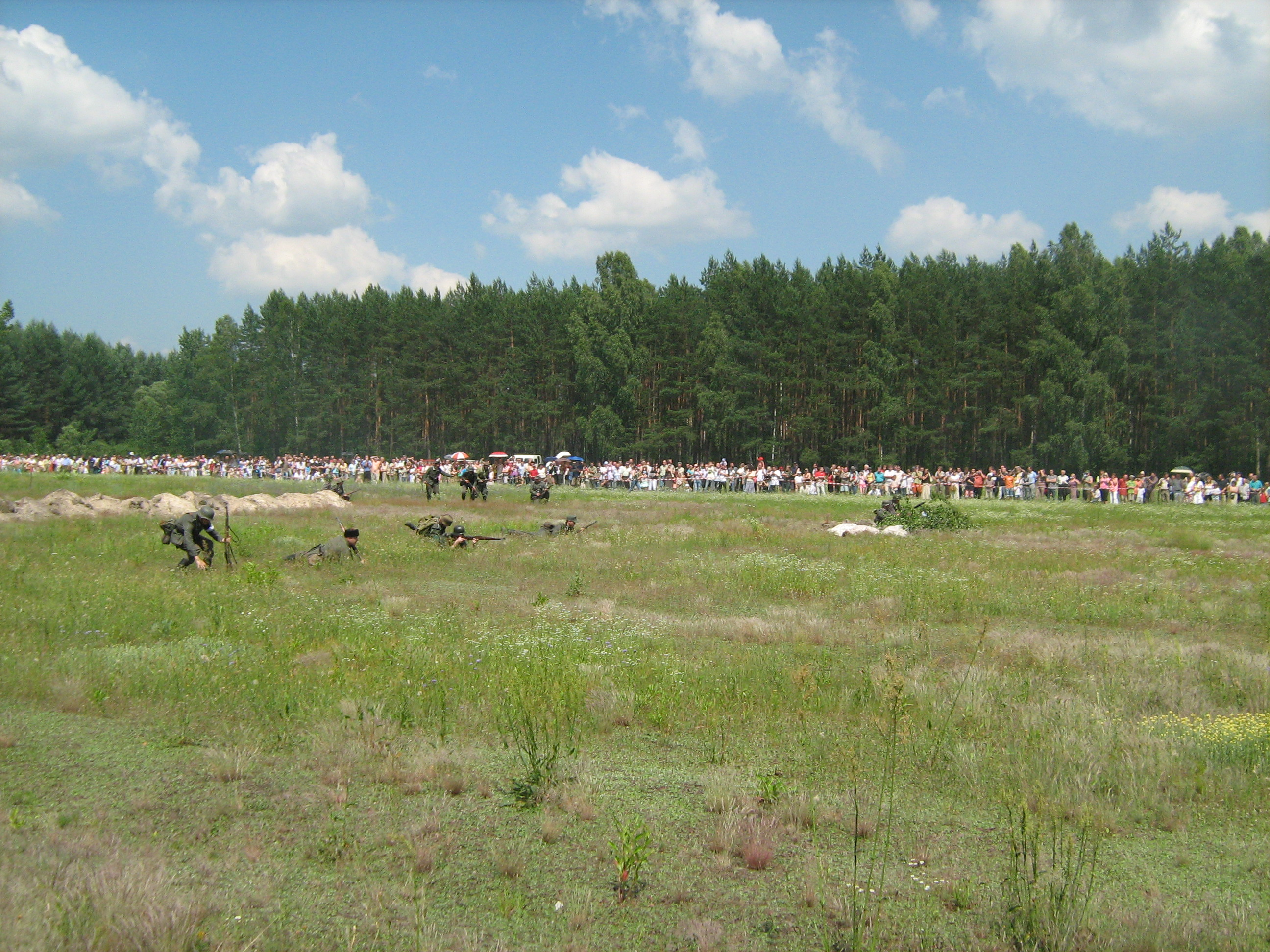
- Historical recreation of battle of Osuchy; summer 2009
Date	25–26 June 1944
Location	Solska Forest, near Osuchy, Poland
Result	German victory

Belligerents
(Polish Underground State) Polish resistance (Armia Krajowa, Bataliony Chłopskie)	Germany

Commanders and leaders
mjr Edward Markiewicz "Kalina"; Rotmistrz Mieczysław Rakoczy "Miecz" lt. Konrad Bartoszewski "Wir"	General Friedrich Altrichter

Strength
~1,200	~30,000

Casualties and losses
~400	Unknown

The Battle of Osuchy (Polish: Bitwa pod Osuchami; sometimes referred to as the Battle at Sopot River, Polish: Bitwa nad Sopotem ) was one of the largest battles between the Polish resistance and Nazi Germany in occupied Poland during World War II, a part of the Zamość Uprising. It took place near the village of Osuchy in the Solska Forest on 25–26 June 1944 during the German anti-partisan Operation Sturmwind II (Operation Hurricane II). The battle ended with the defeat of the local resistance forces that suffered heavy casualties.

== Background ==
The Nazi terror since 1942 – part of the Generalplan Ost – in the Zamość region in occupied Poland had led to the creation of many active resistance units. Polish partisans (from Armia Krajowa, Bataliony Chłopskie and Armia Ludowa) – with the aid of some Soviet partisans – made the region almost ungovernable to the Germans. The German garrison in the key city of Biłgoraj was mostly cut off from land communication with other forces; the town of Józefów was under resistance control, as were many villages and wilderness regions. Vital German communication lines with the units at the Eastern Front were in peril, and many troops were diverted from the front to deal with the partisans.

The Germans carried out a major security operation in early June, Operation Sturmwind I (German for 'Storm-Wind'). This operation, however, failed to defeat the partisans, who broke out of an encirclement in the Janów Forests (Lasy Janowskie) (according to some estimates, Germans suffered higher casualties than the resistance in Sturmwind I). Some partisan units moved to the Solska Forest and the Germans decided to start another operation – Operation Sturmwind II – to eliminate them. By 15 June most of the Forest was surrounded; the partisan leaders assumed that the Germans would not enter it, but were proven wrong when on 21 June, after artillery and air bombardment, German forces started to advance.

On 22 June the Armia Ludowa unit, numbering about 700, broke through the German lines in the area of Górecko Kościelne village, suffering heavy casualties. Soviet partisans under Lt. Col. Nikolai Prokopiuk – about 1900 people – tried to break free on the night of 22–23 June around Hamernia village; they failed, but succeeded the following night in the area near the Borowiec and Huta Różaniecka villages. Although Polish and Soviet commanders met, they were unable to agree on a common plan (various sources blame different sides). By then only the combined Armia Krajowa and Bataliony Chłopskie units under Major Edward Markiewicz "Kalina" – about 550 people – remained within the closing circle. The partisans were exhausted, pushed into a swampy area, 6 by 4 km, between the Tanew and Sopot rivers. The commander of the remaining partisans, Mjr. Markiewicz, suffered a nervous breakdown, transferred his command to Rotmistrz Mieczysław Rakoczy "Miecz", and committed suicide. Rakoczy in turn transferred the command to Lt. Konrad Bartoszewski "Wir" who decided that the partisans' only hope was to break through along the Sopot river toward Biłgoraj.

German losses in Sturmwind operations amounted to about 1,300 fatalities and similar amount of wounded; partisan losses were similar.

== Opposing forces ==
Polish resistance:

- Armia Krajowa
  - Kurs Młodszych Dowódców Piechoty Obwodu AK Biłgoraj, irregular unit under lt. Konrad Bartoszewski "Wir",
  - 1 Kompania Sztabowa Inspektoratu Zamojskiego AK irregular unit under lt. Adam Haniewicz "Woyna"
  - irregular unit under lt. Józef Stegliński "Cord" (commander of AK Region Biłgoraj)
  - irregular unit under lt. Jan Kryk "Topola"
  - irregular medical unit "Szpital Leśny Obwodu AK Biłgoraj 665" under lt. md. Lucjan Kopeć "Radwan"
- Bataliony Chłopskie
  - part of I Battalion Hrubieszowski under mjr. Stanisław Basaj "Ryś" (left the region before the battle)
  - irregular unit under lt. Jan Kędra "Błyskawica"
  - irregular unit under lt. Antoni Wróbel "Burza"
  - irregular unit under lt. Józef Mazur "Skrzypik"

German forces:

- 154th Reserve Division
- 174th Reserve Division
- 213th Security Division
- 4th Panzer Army
- 115 Country Rifleman Regiment
- air support from Luftflotte 4

== Battle ==
On the night of 24-25 June, the units of Lt. Jan Kryk "Topola" (AK) and Lt. Jozef Mazur "Skrzypik" (BCh) attempted to break through the road near the villages Fryszarka and Borowiec, but were stopped by the German forces and dispersed; both commanders died.

In the meantime, the main partisan forces reached the village of Osuchy near the Sopot river. At dawn on 25 June they launched an assault on the German line. The Germans, however, had fortified their position; the partisans of Mjr. Stanisław Basaj "Ryś" encountered a minefield, and found themselves under German machine gun fire. Soon, the Germans received artillery support. Finding themselves outgunned, the partisans retreated, suffering heavy casualties. The partisan unit under Lt. Jan Kędra "Błyskawica" and Lt. Antoni Wróbel "Burza" managed to break through the first German line, only to encounter a second one 300m beyond it. The most elite of the Polish units - the company of Lt. Adam Haniewicz "Woyna" - broke through the second line, but was stopped at a third line. Running out of manpower and supplies, the partisans were forced to retreat, and were further pushed back by a German counterattack. The unit of Lt. Józef Stegliński "Cord" broke through all three lines but was then engaged and destroyed by German reinforcements. The unit of Lt. Konrad Bartoszewski "Wir", fighting nearby, did however manage to break cleanly out of the German encirclement in the confusion of the battle. The remaining Polish units were forced back into the encirclement; eventually, all these partisans surrendered or were killed.

Account of the battle by Franciszek Nizio, noms de guerre "Jagoda", "Franek", "Spalony"

"We began our charge. At one point, the Germans opened fire with their heavy machine gun on the Krzywa Gorka hill. A hurricane barrage of fire ever-increasing in racket and fury. Our attack continued despite the strong enemy fire. I continued to ran as fast as I could through the crop field dragging my light machine gun along. At times, when the enemy fire was growing stronger and ever more deadly, I fell to the ground and crawled. The German machine gun was causing greater and greater carnage. All around me I could hear screams of the wounded and moans of the dying. The heavy machine gun on the Krzywa Gorka, and the barrage of the enemy fire was causing us heavy losses. At one point, crawling in the crops, I noticed a wire from the German field telephone. I cut it. Moments later, I reached the edge of the grain field and found myself right in front of the enemy machine gun nest. I cocked my light machine gun, but was shocked to realize that it wouldn’t fire. As I ran through the rye field the ripened grain ears must have jammed my gun. All I had now was a revolver and some English grenades. Without thinking too much, I removed the pin from the grenade and threw it in the direction of the furiously firing German machine gun. I realized in horror that the grenade didn’t explode. I forgot, however, that it was, after all, an English grenade with a delayed fuse; you had to wait a moment before throwing it. I thought, 'God, apparently you want us all to die today.' At that moment the grenade went off and the German machine gun fell silent. I got up to my feet and rushed towards the German line. Moments later, our other soldiers reached my position. The fighting went on. On both sides of the enemy line, our soldiers liquidated the remaining German positions. We broke through the German lines."

== Aftermath ==
It is estimated that about 400 out of the 1,200-strong partisan forces that engaged the Germans on 24–25 June were killed (approximately half of the Polish losses during the Sturmwind II). Most of the rest surrendered; some were executed on the spot, and many were tortured for additional information about the resistance; survivors were sent to Nazi concentration camps. Nonetheless, while the Germans had weakened the partisans, they had failed to eliminate them. In July the Polish resistance carried out the country-wide Operation Tempest, and in the Zamość region the town of Szczebrzeszyn and Zamość itself were freed by the partisans. Soon afterward, the Soviet Lublin-Brest Offensive cleared out the Germans from most of the region.

Currently in Osuchy there is a military cemetery dedicated to the partisans who fell in the battle.
