= Sopot (river) =

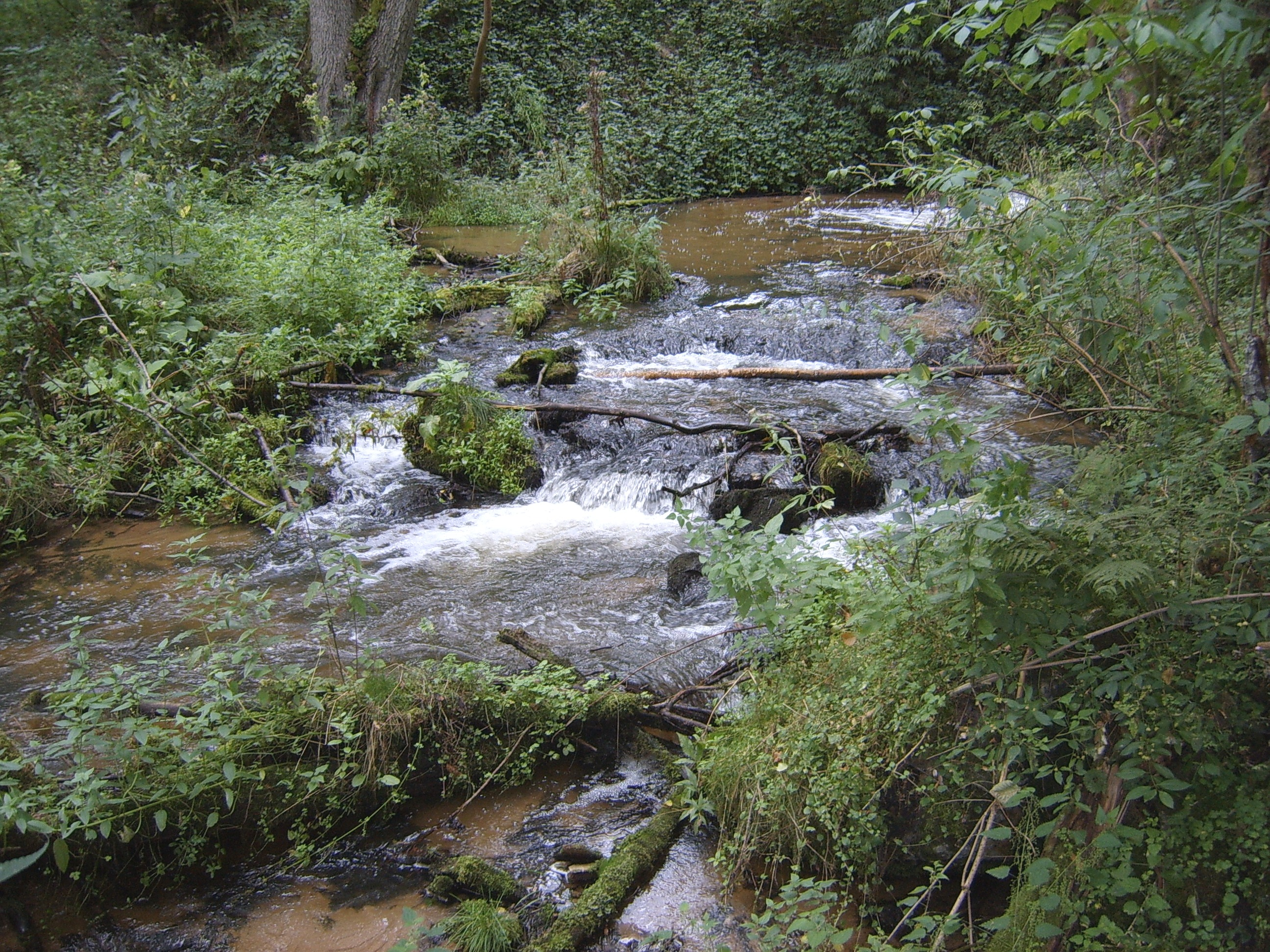
- The Sopot in Czartowe Pole

Location
- Country: Poland

Physical characteristics
- Mouth
  - location: Tanew
  - coordinates: 50.3988°N 22.9569°E
- Length: 22.5 km (14.0 mi)
- Basin size: 123 km (76 mi)

Basin features
- Progression: Tanew→ San→ Vistula→ Baltic Sea

Sopot is a small river in Poland. It originates near the Majdan Sopocki village and flows through Roztocze hills, passing through villages of Ciotusza Stara, Nowiny, Hamernia, and Osuchy. It is a tributary of Tanew.

The river flows through the Polish Landscape Park of Puszcza Solska and the Czartowe Pole nature preserve.
