= June 26 =

June 26 this year in various calendars
- Friday, 26 June 2026
Akan	Kwafie
Armenian	11 Hrotich 1475
Aztec	Tepeilhuitl 7, 12 Cuāuhtli
Babylonian	10 Simanu, 2337 SE
Balinese pawukon	Menga, Beteng, Sri, Wage, Was, Sukra of Kuningan, Sri, Tulus, Pandita
Bengali	12 Asharh, BS 1433
Chinese	Yin Metal Goat・Neck Mansion; Fire Horse Year, Month 5, Day 12 (Xiazhi, 11 days until Xiaoshu)
Common Era	26 June 2026 CE
Coptic	19 Paoni, AM 1742
Egyptian	11 Athyr, 2775 NE
Ethiopian	19 Sanē, 2018 Amätä Məhrät
French Republican	Décade I, Octidi de Messidor de l'Année 234 de la République
Gregorian	26 June, AD 2026
Hebrew	11 Tamuz, AM 5786
Hindu	Viśākhā・Siddha; Solar: 12 Āṣāḍha, 1948 SE; Lunisolar: Dvādaśī, Śukla pakṣa of Jyeṣṭha, 2083 VE; Rāudra・5127 KY・1,872,752
Icelandic	Föstudagur, 5 Sólmánuður 2026
Islamic	10 Muharram, AH 1448 (using tabular method)
ISO week date	2026-W26-5
Japanese	12 Satsuki, Reiwa 8 (Geshi, 11 days until Shōsho)
Julian	13 June, AD 2026 (AM 7534)
Julian day	2461218
Korean	12 Maldal, 4359 DE
Maya	13.0.13.12.15; 8 Tzec, 12 Men
Roman	Idibus Iuniis, MMDCCLXXIX AUC
Solar Hijri	5 Tir, SH 1405
Tibetan	12 snron, me pho rta 2153 or 1772 or 1000

<<	June					>>
Su	Mo	Tu	We	Th	Fr	Sa
	1	2	3	4	5	6
7	8	9	10	11	12	13
14	15	16	17	18	19	20
21	22	23	24	25	26	27
28	29	30
2026

June 26 in recent years
2026 (Friday)
2025 (Thursday)
2024 (Wednesday)
2023 (Monday)
2022 (Sunday)
2021 (Saturday)
2020 (Friday)
2019 (Wednesday)
2018 (Tuesday)
2017 (Monday)

June 26 is the 177th day of the year (178th in leap years) in the Gregorian calendar; 188 days remain until the end of the year.

== Events ==
=== Pre-1600 ===
- 4 – Augustus adopts Tiberius.
- 221 – Roman emperor Elagabalus adopts his cousin Alexander Severus as his heir and grants him the title of Caesar.
- 363 – Roman emperor Julian is fatally wounded by Sassanid troops in a skirmish close to Samarra while retreating from his failed siege of Ctesiphon.
- 684 – Pope Benedict II is consecrated as pope following imperial approval from the Byzantine Emperor. He is the last pope to require the confirmation of the emperor; the next popes require only that of the more closely situated exarch of Ravenna.
- 699 – En no Ozuno, a Japanese mystic and apothecary who will later be regarded as the founder of the folk religion Shugendō, is banished to Izu Ōshima.
- 1243 – Mongols under Baiju Noyan defeat the Seljuk Turks under Kaykhusraw II at the Battle of Köse Dağ. The Sultanate of Rum subsequently becomes a vassal to the Mongol Empire.
- 1243 – Election of Pope Innocent IV following the death of Pope Celestine IV in 1241.
- 1295 – Przemysł II crowned king of Poland, following Ducal period. The white eagle is added to the Polish coat of arms.
- 1407 – Ulrich von Jungingen becomes Grand Master of the Teutonic Knights.
- 1409 – Western Schism: The Roman Catholic Church is led into a double schism as Petros Philargos is crowned Pope Alexander V after the Council of Pisa, joining Pope Gregory XII in Rome and Pope Benedict XIII in Avignon.
- 1460 – War of the Roses: Richard Neville, 16th Earl of Warwick, and Edward, Earl of March, land in England with a rebel army and march on London.
- 1483 – Richard III becomes King of England.
- 1522 – Ottomans begin the second Siege of Rhodes.
- 1539 – Afghan Sur forces under Sher Shah Suri defeat a Mughal army under Humayun in the battle of Chausa.
- 1541 – Francisco Pizarro is assassinated in Lima by the son of his former companion and later antagonist, Diego de Almagro the younger. Almagro is later caught and executed.
- 1579 – Livonian campaign of Stephen Báthory begins.

=== 1601–1900 ===
- 1656 – A joined Hospitaller-Venetian fleet defeats a numerically superior Ottoman fleet in the battle of the Dardanelles.
- 1718 – Alexei Petrovich, Tsarevich of Russia, Peter the Great's son, mysteriously dies after being sentenced to death by his father for plotting against him.
- 1723 – After a siege and bombardment by cannon, Baku surrenders to the Russians.
- 1740 – A combined force of Spanish, free blacks and allied Indians defeat a British garrison at the Siege of Fort Mose near St. Augustine during the War of Jenkins' Ear.
- 1794 – French Revolutionary Wars: Battle of Fleurus marks the first successful military use of aircraft and turns the tide of the War of the First Coalition.
- 1830 – William IV becomes king of Britain and Hanover following the death without surviving legitimate issue of his older brother George IV.
- 1843 – Treaty of Nanking comes into effect; Hong Kong Island is ceded to the British "in perpetuity".
- 1848 – End of the June Days Uprising in Paris, France.
- 1857 – The first investiture of the Victoria Cross takes place in Hyde Park, London.
- 1886 – Henri Moissan isolates elemental fluorine for the first time.
- 1889 – Bangui is founded by Albert Dolisie and Alfred Uzac in what was then the upper reaches of the French Congo.

=== 1901–present ===
- 1906 – The first Grand Prix motor race is held at Le Mans.
- 1909 – The Science Museum in London comes into existence as an independent entity.
- 1917 – World War I: The American Expeditionary Forces begin to arrive in France. They will first enter combat in the Battle of Hamel on July 4.
- 1918 – World War I: Allied forces under John J. Pershing and James Harbord defeat Imperial German forces under Wilhelm, German Crown Prince in the Battle of Belleau Wood.
- 1924 – The American occupation of the Dominican Republic ends after eight years.
- 1934 – United States President Franklin D. Roosevelt signs the Federal Credit Union Act, which establishes credit unions.
- 1936 – Initial flight of the Focke-Wulf Fw 61, the first practical helicopter.
- 1940 – World War II: Under the Molotov–Ribbentrop Pact, the Soviet Union presents an ultimatum to Romania requiring it to cede Bessarabia and the northern part of Bukovina.
- 1941 – World War II: Soviet planes bomb Kassa, Hungary (now Košice, Slovakia), giving Hungary the impetus to declare war the next day.
- 1942 – The first flight of the Grumman F6F Hellcat.
- 1944 – World War II: San Marino, a neutral state, is mistakenly bombed by the RAF based on faulty information, leading to 35 civilian deaths.
- 1944 – World War II: The Battle of Osuchy in Osuchy, Poland, one of the largest battles between Nazi Germany and Polish resistance forces, ends with the defeat of the latter.
- 1945 – The United Nations Charter is signed by 50 Allied nations in San Francisco, California.
- 1948 – Cold War: The first supply flights are made in response to the Berlin Blockade.
- 1948 – William Shockley files the original patent for the grown-junction transistor, the first bipolar junction transistor.
- 1952 – The Pan-Malayan Labour Party is founded in Malaya, as a union of statewide labour parties.
- 1953 – Lavrentiy Beria, head of MVD, is arrested by Nikita Khrushchev and other members of the Politburo.
- 1955 – The South African Congress Alliance adopts the Freedom Charter at the Congress of the People in Kliptown.
- 1959 – Swedish boxer Ingemar Johansson becomes world champion of heavyweight boxing, by defeating American Floyd Patterson on technical knockout after two minutes and three seconds in the third round at Yankee Stadium.
- 1960 – The former British Protectorate of British Somaliland gains its independence as Somaliland.
- 1960 – Madagascar gains its independence from France.
- 1963 – Cold War: U.S. President John F. Kennedy gives his "Ich bin ein Berliner" speech, underlining the support of the United States for democratic West Germany shortly after Soviet-supported East Germany erected the Berlin Wall.
- 1967 – Karol Wojtyła (later John Paul II) is made a cardinal by Pope Paul VI.
- 1974 – The Universal Product Code is scanned for the first time to sell a package of Wrigley's chewing gum at the Marsh Supermarket in Troy, Ohio.
- 1975 – Two FBI agents and a member of the American Indian Movement are killed in a shootout on the Pine Ridge Indian Reservation in South Dakota; Leonard Peltier is later convicted of the murders in a controversial trial.
- 1978 – Air Canada Flight 189, flying to Toronto, overruns the runway and crashes into the Etobicoke Creek ravine. Two of the 107 passengers on board perish.
- 1981 – Dan-Air Flight 240, flying to East Midlands Airport, crashes in Nailstone, Leicestershire. All three crew members perish.
- 1988 – The first crash of an Airbus A320 occurs when Air France Flight 296Q crashes at Mulhouse–Habsheim Airfield in Habsheim, France, during an air show, killing three of the 136 people on board.
- 1991 – Yugoslav Wars: The Yugoslav People's Army begins the Ten-Day War in Slovenia.
- 1995 – Hamad bin Khalifa Al Thani deposes his father Khalifa bin Hamad Al Thani, the Emir of Qatar, in a bloodless coup d'état.
- 1997 – The U.S. Supreme Court rules that the Communications Decency Act violates the First Amendment to the United States Constitution.
- 1997 – J. K. Rowling publishes the first of her Harry Potter novel series, Harry Potter and the Philosopher's Stone, in the United Kingdom.
- 2000 – The Human Genome Project announces the completion of a "rough draft" sequence.
- 2003 – The U.S. Supreme Court rules in Lawrence v. Texas that sex-based sodomy laws are unconstitutional.
- 2006 – Mari Alkatiri, the first Prime Minister of East Timor, resigns after weeks of political unrest.
- 2007 – Pope Benedict XVI reinstates the traditional laws of papal election in which a successful candidate must receive two-thirds of the votes.
- 2008 – A suicide bomber dressed as an Iraqi policeman detonates an explosive vest, killing 25 people.
- 2012 – The Waldo Canyon fire descends into the Mountain Shadows neighborhood in Colorado Springs, United States, burning 347 homes in a matter of hours and killing two people.
- 2013 – Riots in China's Xinjiang region kill at least 36 people and injure 21 others.
- 2013 – The U.S. Supreme Court rules, 5–4, that Section 3 of the Defense of Marriage Act is unconstitutional and in violation of the Fifth Amendment to the United States Constitution.
- 2015 – Five different terrorist attacks in France, Tunisia, Somalia, Kuwait, and Syria occur on what was dubbed Bloody Friday by international media. Upwards of 750 people are either killed or injured in these uncoordinated attacks.
- 2015 – The U.S. Supreme Court rules, 5–4, that same-sex couples have a constitutional right to marriage under the 14th Amendment to the United States Constitution.
- 2024 – Julian Assange, founder of WikiLeaks, returns to Australia after pleading guilty to one charge of espionage in a Saipan court and subsequently being released by the United States Department of Justice.

== Births ==
=== Pre-1600 ===
- 12 BC – Agrippa Postumus, Roman son of Marcus Vipsanius Agrippa and Julia the Elder (died 14)
- 1399 – John, Count of Angoulême (died 1467)
- 1467 – Ferdinand II of Naples (died 1496)
- 1575 – Anne Catherine of Brandenburg (died 1612)
- 1581 – San Pedro Claver, Spanish Jesuit saint (died 1654)
- 1600 – Juan de Palafox y Mendoza, Spanish-born bishop and viceroy of New Spain (died 1659)

=== 1601–1900 ===
- 1681 – Hedvig Sophia of Sweden (died 1708)
- 1689 – Edward Holyoke, American pastor and academic (died 1769)
- 1694 – Georg Brandt, Swedish chemist and mineralogist (died 1768)
- 1699 – Marie Thérèse Rodet Geoffrin, French businesswoman (died 1777)
- 1702 – Philip Doddridge, English hymn-writer and educator (died 1751)
- 1703 – Thomas Clap, American minister and academic (died 1767)
- 1726 – Victor Amadeus III, King of Sardinia (died 1796)
- 1730 – Charles Messier, French astronomer and academic (died 1817)
- 1764 – Jan Paweł Łuszczewski, Polish politician (died 1812)
- 1786 – Sunthorn Phu, Thai poet (died 1855)
- 1796 – Jan Paweł Lelewel, Polish painter and engineer (died 1847)
- 1798 – Wolfgang Menzel, German poet and critic (died 1873)
- 1817 – Branwell Brontë, English painter and poet (died 1848)
- 1819 – Abner Doubleday, American general (died 1893)
- 1821 – Bartolomé Mitre, Argentinian soldier, journalist, and politician, 6th President of Argentina (died 1906)
- 1824 – William Thomson, 1st Baron Kelvin, Irish-Scottish physicist and engineer (died 1907)
- 1835 – Thomas W. Knox, American journalist and author (died 1896)
- 1839 – Sam Watkins, American soldier and author (died 1901)
- 1852 – Daoud Corm, Lebanese painter (died 1930)
- 1854 – Robert Laird Borden, Canadian lawyer and politician, 8th Prime Minister of Canada (died 1937)
- 1865 – Bernard Berenson, Lithuanian-American historian and author (died 1959)
- 1866 – George Herbert, 5th Earl of Carnarvon, English archaeologist and banker, backer in the discovery of Tutankhamun's tomb (died 1923)
- 1869 – Martin Andersen Nexø, Danish journalist and author (died 1954)
- 1878 – Leopold Löwenheim, German mathematician and logician (died 1957)
- 1880 – Mitchell Lewis, American actor (died 1956)
- 1881 – Ya'akov Cohen, Israeli linguist, poet, and playwright (died 1960)
- 1892 – Pearl S. Buck, American novelist, essayist, short story writer, Nobel Prize laureate (died 1973)
- 1893 – Dorothy Fuldheim, American journalist and news anchor (died 1989)
- 1895 – George Hainsworth, Canadian ice hockey player and politician (died 1950)
- 1898 – Willy Messerschmitt, German engineer and businessman (died 1978)
- 1898 – Chesty Puller, US general (died 1971)
- 1899 – Grand Duchess Maria Nikolaevna of Russia (died 1918)

=== 1901–present ===
- 1901 – Stuart Symington, American lieutenant and politician, 1st United States Secretary of the Air Force (died 1988)
- 1902 – Hugues Cuénod, Swiss tenor and educator (died 2010)
- 1903 – Big Bill Broonzy, American singer-songwriter and guitarist (died 1958)
- 1904 – Peter Lorre, Slovak-American actor and singer (died 1964)
- 1905 – Lynd Ward, American author and illustrator (died 1985)
- 1906 – Alberto Rabagliati, Italian singer (died 1974)
- 1908 – Salvador Allende, Chilean physician and politician, 29th President of Chile (died 1973)
- 1909 – Colonel Tom Parker, Dutch-American talent manager, manager and promoter of Elvis Presley (died 1997)
- 1909 – Wolfgang Reitherman, German-American animator, director, and producer (died 1985)
- 1911 – Babe Didrikson Zaharias, American golfer and basketball player (died 1956)
- 1911 – Bronisław Żurakowski, Polish pilot and engineer (died 2009)
- 1913 – Aimé Césaire, French poet, author, and politician (died 2008)
- 1913 – Maurice Wilkes, English computer scientist and physicist (died 2010)
- 1914 – Laurie Lee, English author and poet (died 1997)
- 1914 – Sultan Ahmad Nanupuri, Bangladeshi Islamic scholar and teacher (died 1997)
- 1914 – Princess Sophie of Greece and Denmark, European royalty (died 2001)
- 1915 – Paul Castellano, American gangster (died 1985)
- 1915 – George Haigh, English professional footballer (died 2019)
- 1915 – Charlotte Zolotow, American author and poet (died 2013)
- 1915 – Willard Brown, American baseball player (died 1996)
- 1916 – Virginia Satir, American psychotherapist and author (died 1988)
- 1916 – Giuseppe Taddei, Italian actor and singer (died 2010)
- 1917 – Idriz Ajeti, Albanian albanologist (died 2019)
- 1918 – Leo Rosner, Polish-born Austrian Jewish musician (died 2008)
- 1919 – Richard Neustadt, American political scientist and academic (died 2003)
- 1920 – Jean-Pierre Roy, Canadian-American baseball player, manager, and sportscaster (died 2014)
- 1921 – Violette Szabo, French-British secret agent (died 1945)
- 1922 – Eleanor Parker, American actress (died 2013)
- 1923 – Franz-Paul Decker, German conductor (died 2014)
- 1924 – Kostas Axelos, Greek-French philosopher and author (died 2010)
- 1925 – Pavel Belyayev, Soviet soldier, pilot and cosmonaut (died 1970)
- 1925 – Wolfgang Unzicker, German chess player (died 2006)
- 1926 – Mahendra Bhatnagar, Indian poet (died 2020)
- 1926 – Fernando Mönckeberg Barros, Chilean surgeon
- 1926 – Dinu Zamfirescu, Romanian politician
- 1927 – Robert Kroetsch, Canadian author and poet (died 2011)
- 1928 – Jacob Druckman, American composer and academic (died 1996)
- 1928 – Yoshiro Nakamatsu, Japanese inventor
- 1928 – Bill Sheffield, American politician; 5th Governor of Alaska (died 2022)
- 1929 – June Bronhill, Australian soprano and actress (died 2005)
- 1929 – Milton Glaser, American illustrator and graphic designer (died 2020)
- 1930 – Wolfgang Schwanitz, East German secret police (died 2022)
- 1931 – Colin Wilson, English philosopher and author (died 2013)
- 1932 – Dame Marguerite Pindling, Bahamian politician; Governor-General of the Bahamas
- 1933 – Claudio Abbado, Italian conductor (died 2014)
- 1934 – Dave Grusin, American pianist and composer
- 1934 – Toru Goto, Japanese swimmer
- 1935 – Carlo Facetti, Italian racing driver
- 1935 – Sandro Riminucci, Italian basketball player
- 1936 – Benjamin Adekunle, Nigerian general (died 2014)
- 1936 – Hal Greer, American basketball player (died 2018)
- 1936 – Robert Maclennan, Baron Maclennan of Rogart, Scottish politician (died 2020)
- 1936 – Edith Pearlman, American short story writer (died 2023)
- 1936 – Jean-Claude Turcotte, Canadian cardinal (died 2015)
- 1936 – Nancy Willard, American author and poet (died 2017)
- 1937 – Robert Coleman Richardson, American physicist and academic, Nobel Prize laureate (died 2013)
- 1937 – Reggie Workman, American bassist and composer
- 1938 – Neil Abercrombie, American sociologist and politician, 7th Governor of Hawaii
- 1938 – Billy Davis Jr., American pop-soul singer
- 1938 – Gerald North, American climatologist and academic
- 1939 – Chuck Robb, American soldier, lawyer, and politician, 64th Governor of Virginia
- 1939 – Zainuddin Maidin, Malaysian politician (died 2018)
- 1941 – Yves Beauchemin, Canadian author and academic
- 1942 – J. J. Dillon, American wrestler and manager
- 1942 – Gilberto Gil, Brazilian singer-songwriter, guitarist, and politician, Brazilian Minister of Culture
- 1943 – Georgie Fame, English singer, pianist, and keyboard player
- 1943 – Warren Farrell, American author and educator
- 1943 – Bill Robinson, American baseball player (died 2007)
- 1944 – Gennady Zyuganov, Russian politician
- 1945 – Issa al-Haadi al-Mahdi (Dwight York), American criminal, black supremacist, pedophile, convicted child molester, and musician
- 1946 – Candace Pert, American neuroscientist and pharmacologist (died 2013)
- 1949 – Fredric Brandt, American dermatologist and author (died 2015)
- 1949 – Adrian Gurvitz, English singer-songwriter and producer
- 1949 – Mary Styles Harris, American biologist and geneticist
- 1951 – Gary Gilmour, Australian cricketer and manager (died 2014)
- 1952 – Gordon McQueen, Scottish footballer and manager (died 2023)
- 1952 – Olive Morris, Jamaican-English civil rights activist (died 1979)
- 1952 – Simon Mann, British military officer and mercenary (died 2025)
- 1954 – Luis Arconada, Spanish footballer
- 1955 – Mick Jones, English singer-songwriter and guitarist
- 1955 – Gedde Watanabe, American actor
- 1956 – Chris Isaak, American singer-songwriter, guitarist, and actor
- 1956 – Catherine Samba-Panza, interim president of the Central African Republic
- 1957 – Philippe Couillard, Canadian surgeon and politician, 31st Premier of Quebec
- 1957 – Patty Smyth, American singer-songwriter and musician
- 1959 – Mark McKinney, Canadian actor and screenwriter
- 1960 – Mark Durkan, Irish politician
- 1961 – Greg LeMond, American cyclist
- 1961 – Terri Nunn, American singer-songwriter and actress
- 1962 – Jerome Kersey, American basketball player and coach (died 2015)
- 1963 – Mikhail Khodorkovsky, Russian-Swiss businessman and philanthropist
- 1964 – Tommi Mäkinen, Finnish racing driver
- 1966 – Dany Boon, French actor, director, and screenwriter
- 1966 – Kirk McLean, Canadian ice hockey player
- 1967 – Inha Babakova, Ukrainian high jumper
- 1967 – Olivier Dahan, French director and screenwriter
- 1968 – Guðni Th. Jóhannesson, Icelandic lecturer and politician, 6th President of Iceland
- 1968 – Paolo Maldini, Italian footballer
- 1968 – Shannon Sharpe, American football player
- 1969 – Colin Greenwood, English bass player and songwriter
- 1969 – Ingrid Lempereur, Belgian swimmer
- 1969 – Geir Moen, Norwegian sprinter
- 1969 – Mike Myers, American baseball player
- 1970 – Paul Thomas Anderson, American director, producer, and screenwriter
- 1970 – Paul Bitok, Kenyan runner
- 1970 – Irv Gotti, American record producer, co-founded Murder Inc Records (died 2025)
- 1970 – Sean Hayes, American actor
- 1970 – Matt Letscher, American actor and playwright
- 1970 – Adam Ndlovu, Zimbabwean footballer (died 2012)
- 1970 – Chris O'Donnell, American actor
- 1970 – Nick Offerman, American actor
- 1971 – Max Biaggi, Italian motorcycle racer
- 1972 – Jai Taurima, Australian long jumper
- 1973 – Gretchen Wilson, American singer-songwriter and guitarist
- 1974 – Derek Jeter, American baseball player
- 1974 – Jason Kendall, American baseball player
- 1975 – Chris Armstrong, Canadian ice hockey player
- 1976 – Ed Jovanovski, Canadian ice hockey player
- 1976 – Pommie Mbangwa, Zimbabwean cricketer and sportscaster
- 1976 – Dave Rubin, American political commentator
- 1977 – Quincy Lewis, American basketball player
- 1979 – Ryō Fukuda, Japanese racing driver
- 1979 – Walter Herrmann, Argentinian basketball player
- 1979 – Ryan Tedder, American singer-songwriter, pianist, and producer
- 1980 – Hamílton Hênio Ferreira Calheiros, Togolese footballer
- 1980 – Michael Jackson, English footballer
- 1980 – Jason Schwartzman, American actor and drummer
- 1980 – Chris Shelton, American baseball player
- 1980 – Michael Vick, American football player
- 1981 – Natalya Antyukh, Russian sprinter and hurdler
- 1981 – Paolo Cannavaro, Italian footballer
- 1981 – Kanako Kondō, Japanese voice actress and singer
- 1981 – Takashi Toritani, Japanese baseball player
- 1982 – Zuzana Kučová, Slovak tennis player
- 1983 – Vinícius Rodrigues Almeida, Brazilian footballer
- 1983 – Nick Compton, South African-English cricketer
- 1983 – Toyonoshima Daiki, Japanese sumo wrestler
- 1983 – Felipe Melo, Brazilian footballer
- 1983 – Antonio Rosati, Italian footballer
- 1984 – J. J. Barea, Puerto Rican-American basketball player
- 1984 – Yankuba Ceesay, Gambian footballer
- 1984 – Elijah Dukes, American baseball player
- 1984 – Raymond Felton, American basketball player
- 1984 – Indila, French singer
- 1984 – Priscah Jeptoo, Kenyan runner
- 1984 – Aubrey Plaza, American actress
- 1984 – Preslava, Bulgarian singer
- 1984 – Deron Williams, American basketball player
- 1984 – Cody McLeod, Canadian ice hockey player
- 1985 – Ogyen Trinley Dorje, Tibetan spiritual leader, 17th Karmapa Lama
- 1986 – Duvier Riascos, Colombian footballer
- 1987 – Carlos Iaconelli, Brazilian racing driver
- 1987 – Samir Nasri, French footballer
- 1988 – Oliver Stang, German footballer
- 1988 – King Bach, Canadian-American actor, comedian, director, producer, writer and social media personality
- 1990 – Belaynesh Oljira, Ethiopian runner
- 1990 – Iman Shumpert, American basketball player
- 1990 – Igor Subbotin, Estonian footballer
- 1990 – Brandon Sklenar, American actor
- 1991 – Houssem Chemali, French footballer
- 1991 – Diego Falcinelli, Italian footballer
- 1991 – Dustin Martin, Australian rules footballer
- 1992 – Joel Campbell, Costa Rican footballer
- 1992 – Rudy Gobert, French basketball player
- 1992 – Jennette McCurdy, American actress and singer-songwriter
- 1993 – Ariana Grande, American singer-songwriter, dancer, and actress
- 1994 – Hollie Arnold, English javelin thrower
- 1994 – Leonard Carow, German actor
- 1997 – Baek Ye-rin, South Korean singer
- 1997 – Jacob Elordi, Australian actor
- 1997 – Callum Taylor, English cricketer
- 1997 – Ethan Bear, Canadian ice hockey player
- 1999 – Connor Dewar, Canadian ice hockey player
- 2000 – Ann Li, American tennis player
- 2002 – Chandler Smith, American race car driver
- 2002 – Manon Bannerman, Swiss singer and dancer
- 2004 – Mikey Williams, American basketball player
- 2005 – Princess Alexia of the Netherlands

== Deaths ==
=== Pre-1600 ===
- 116 BC – Ptolemy VIII, king of Egypt
- 363 – Julian the Apostate, Roman emperor (born 332)
- 405 – Vigilius, bishop of Trent (born 353)
- 822 – Saichō, Japanese Buddhist monk (born 767)
- 969 – George El Mozahem, Egyptian martyr (born 940)
- 985 – Ramiro III, king of León
- 1090 – Jaromír, bishop of Prague
- 1095 – Robert, bishop of Hereford
- 1265 – Anne of Bohemia, duchess of Silesia (born 1203 or 1204)
- 1274 – Nasir al-Din al-Tusi, Persian scientist and writer (born 1201)
- 1487 – John Argyropoulos, Byzantine philosopher and scholar (born 1415)
- 1541 – Francisco Pizarro, Spanish explorer and politician, Governor of New Castile (born c. 1471)
- 1574 – Gabriel de Lorges, Count of Montgomery, captain of the Scottish Guard of Henry II of France (born 1530)

=== 1601–1900 ===
- 1677 – Francesco Buonamici, Italian architect, painter and engraver (born 1596)
- 1688 – Ralph Cudworth, English philosopher and academic (born 1617)
- 1752 – Giulio Alberoni, Spanish cardinal (born 1664)
- 1757 – Maximilian Ulysses Browne, Austrian field marshal (born 1705)
- 1784 – Caesar Rodney, American lawyer and politician, 4th Governor of Delaware (born 1728)
- 1793 – Gilbert White, English ornithologist and ecologist (born 1720)
- 1795 – Johannes Jährig, German linguist and translator (born 1747)
- 1798 – James Dickey, Irish revolutionary (born 1776)
- 1808 – Ludwik Tyszkiewicz, Polish poet and politician (born 1748)
- 1810 – Joseph-Michel Montgolfier, French inventor, co-invented the hot air balloon (born 1740)
- 1830 – George IV, King of the United Kingdom (born 1762)
- 1836 – Claude Joseph Rouget de Lisle, French soldier and composer (born 1760)
- 1856 – Max Stirner, German philosopher and author (born 1806)
- 1860 – George Montgomery White, American politician (born 1828)
- 1870 – Armand Barbès, French lawyer and politician (born 1809)
- 1878 – Mercedes of Orléans, Queen Consort of King Alfonso XII of Spain (born 1860)
- 1879 – Richard H. Anderson, American general (born 1821)
- 1883 – Edward Sabine, Irish-English astronomer, geophysicist, and ornithologist (born 1788)

=== 1901–present ===
- 1918 – Peter Rosegger, Austrian poet and author (born 1843)
- 1922 – Prince Albert I of Monaco (born 1848)
- 1927 – Armand Guillaumin, French painter (born 1841)
- 1932 – Adelaide Ames, American astronomer and academic (born 1900)
- 1938 – James Weldon Johnson, American poet, lawyer and politician (born 1871)
- 1938 – Daria Pratt, American golfer (born 1859)
- 1939 – Ford Madox Ford, English novelist, poet, and critic (born 1873)
- 1943 – Karl Landsteiner, Austrian biologist and physician, Nobel Prize laureate (born 1868)
- 1945 – Emil Hácha, Czech lawyer and politician, 3rd President of Czechoslovakia (born 1872)
- 1946 – Max Kögel, German SS officer (born 1895)
- 1946 – Yōsuke Matsuoka, Japanese politician, Japanese Minister of Foreign Affairs (born 1880)
- 1947 – R. B. Bennett, Canadian lawyer and politician, 11th Prime Minister of Canada (born 1870)
- 1949 – Kim Koo, South Korean educator and politician, 13th President of the Provisional Government of the Republic of Korea (born 1876)
- 1955 – Engelbert Zaschka, German engineer (born 1895)
- 1956 – Clifford Brown, American trumpet player and composer (born 1930)
- 1956 – Richie Powell, American pianist (born 1931)
- 1957 – Alfred Döblin, Polish-German physician and author (born 1878)
- 1957 – Malcolm Lowry, English novelist and poet (born 1909)
- 1958 – George Orton, Canadian runner and hurdler (born 1873)
- 1958 – Andrija Štampar, Croatian physician and scholar (born 1888)
- 1964 – Léo Dandurand, American-Canadian businessman (born 1889)
- 1967 – Françoise Dorléac, French actress and singer (born 1942)
- 1975 – Josemaría Escrivá, Spanish priest and saint (born 1902)
- 1979 – Akwasi Afrifa, Ghanaian soldier and politician, 3rd Head of State of Ghana (born 1936)
- 1982 – Alexander Mitscherlich, German psychiatrist and psychoanalyst (born 1908)
- 1989 – Howard Charles Green, Canadian lawyer and politician, 27th Canadian Minister of Public Works (born 1895)
- 1990 – Anni Blomqvist, Finnish author (born 1909)
- 1992 – Buddy Rogers, American wrestler (born 1921)
- 1993 – Roy Campanella, American baseball player and coach (born 1921)
- 1993 – William H. Riker, American political scientist and academic (born 1920)
- 1994 – Jahanara Imam, Bangladeshi author and activist (born 1929)
- 1996 – Veronica Guerin, Irish journalist (born 1958)
- 1996 – Necmettin Hacıeminoğlu, Turkish linguist and academic (born 1932)
- 1997 – Don Hutson, American football player and coach (born 1913)
- 1998 – Hacı Sabancı, Turkish businessman and philanthropist (born 1935)
- 2001 – Gina Cigna, French-Italian soprano (born 1900)
- 2002 – Jay Berwanger, American football player (born 1914)
- 2002 – Arnold Brown, English-Canadian 11th General of The Salvation Army (born 1913)
- 2002 – Philip Whalen, American poet and novelist (born 1923)
- 2003 – Marc-Vivien Foé, Cameroon footballer (born 1975)
- 2003 – Denis Thatcher, English soldier and businessman (born 1915)
- 2003 – Strom Thurmond, American general, lawyer, and politician, 103rd Governor of South Carolina (born 1902)
- 2004 – Ott Arder, Estonian poet and translator (born 1950)
- 2004 – Yash Johar, Indian film producer, founded Dharma Productions (born 1929)
- 2004 – Naomi Shemer, Israeli singer-songwriter (born 1930)
- 2005 – Tõnno Lepmets, Estonian basketball player (born 1938)
- 2005 – Richard Whiteley, English journalist and game show host (born 1943)
- 2006 – Tommy Wonder, Dutch magician (born 1953)
- 2007 – Liz Claiborne, Belgian-American fashion designer, founded Liz Claiborne (born 1929)
- 2007 – Joey Sadler, New Zealand rugby player (born 1914)
- 2010 – Algirdas Brazauskas, Lithuanian engineer and politician, 4th President of Lithuania (born 1932)
- 2010 – Harald Keres, Estonian physicist and academic (born 1912)
- 2011 – Edith Fellows, American actress (born 1923)
- 2011 – Jan van Beveren, Dutch footballer and coach (born 1948)
- 2012 – Sverker Åström, Swedish diplomat, Swedish Permanent Representative to the United Nations (born 1915)
- 2012 – Pat Cummings, American basketball player (born 1956)
- 2012 – Nora Ephron, American director, producer, and screenwriter (born 1941)
- 2012 – Mario O'Hara, Filipino director, producer, and screenwriter (born 1944)
- 2012 – Doris Singleton, American actress (born 1919)
- 2013 – Henrik Otto Donner, Finnish trumpet player and composer (born 1939)
- 2013 – Edward Huggins Johnstone, Brazilian-American sergeant and judge (born 1922)
- 2013 – Byron Looper, American politician (born 1964)
- 2013 – Justin Miller, American baseball player (born 1977)
- 2013 – Marc Rich, Belgian-American businessman (born 1934)
- 2014 – Howard Baker, American lawyer, politician, and diplomat, 12th White House Chief of Staff (born 1925)
- 2014 – Bill Frank, American-Canadian football player (born 1938)
- 2014 – Rollin King, American businessman, co-founded Southwest Airlines (born 1931)
- 2014 – Bob Mischak, American football player and coach (born 1932)
- 2014 – Julius Rudel, Austrian-American conductor (born 1921)
- 2014 – Mary Rodgers, American composer and author (born 1931)
- 2015 – Yevgeny Primakov, Ukrainian-Russian journalist and politician, 32nd Prime Minister of Russia (born 1929)
- 2015 – Chris Thompson, American screenwriter and producer (born 1952)
- 2019 – Beth Chapman, American reality Television star, Bounty Hunter (born 1967)
- 2019 – Emily Stonington, American politician from Montana (born 1947)
- 2020 – Milton Glaser, American graphic designer (born 1929)
- 2021 – Mike Gravel, American politician (born 1930)
- 2022 – Margaret Keane, American artist (born 1927)
- 2024 – Taiki Matsuno, Japanese voice actor (born 1967)
- 2025 – Carolyn McCarthy, American nurse and politician (born 1944)
- 2025 – Bill Moyers, American journalist, 13th White House Press Secretary (born 1934)
- 2025 – Lalo Schifrin, Argentinian pianist, composer, and conductor (born 1932)
- 2025 – Takutai Tarsh Kemp, New Zealand politician (born 1975)
- 2026 – Joe Doering, American professional wrestler (born 1982)

== Holidays and observances ==
- Day of the Armed Forces of Azerbaijan
- Christian feast day:
  - Anthelm of Belley
  - David the Dendrite
  - Blessed Giacinto Longhin
  - Hermogius
  - Isabel Florence Hapgood (Episcopal Church)
  - Jeremiah (Lutheran)
  - John and Paul
  - José María Robles Hurtado (one of Saints of the Cristero War)
  - Josemaría Escrivá
  - Mar Abhai (Syriac Orthodox Church)
  - Pelagius of Córdoba
  - Blessed Therese-Madeleine Fantou
  - Vigilius of Trent
  - June 26 (Eastern Orthodox liturgics)
- Independence Day, celebrates the independence of Somaliland from United Kingdom in 1960. (Somaliland)
- International Day against Drug Abuse and Illicit Trafficking (International)
- International Day in Support of Victims of Torture (International)
- World Refrigeration Day (International)
