= Solska Forest =

Forest in southern Lublin Voivodeship, Poland

Solska Forest Polish: Puszcza Solska
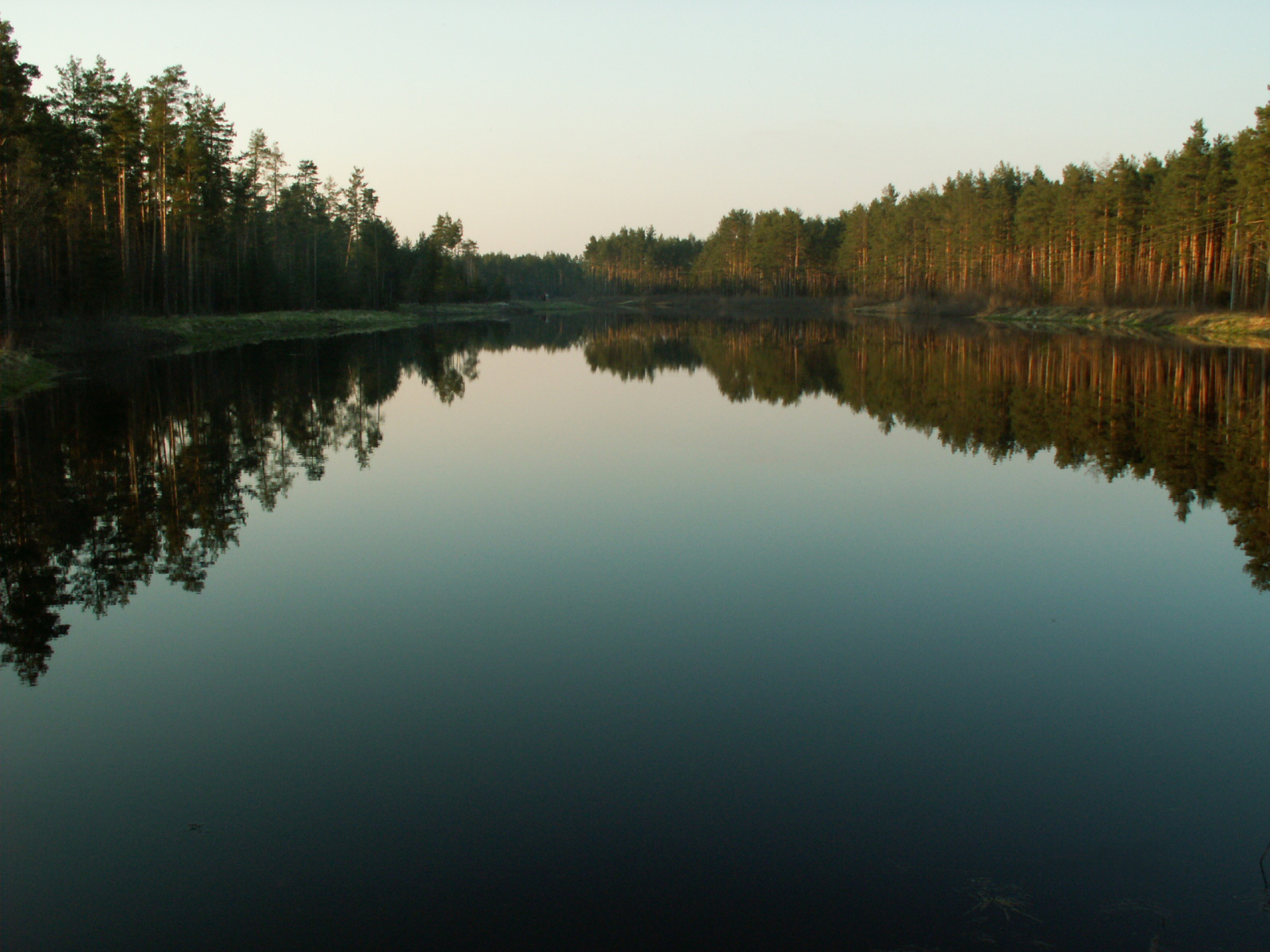
- Szum river reservoir, Solska Forest

- Location within Poland
- Interactive map of Solska Forest

Geography
- Location: Lublin Voivodeship, Poland
- Coordinates: 50°30′00″N 23°00′00″E

Ecology
- Dominant tree species: pine, fir

Solska Forest (Polish: Puszcza Solska) is a large forest complex in southern part of the Lublin Voivodeship, about 100km south of Lublin, Poland. It occupies an area north of the San and south of the Roztocze Upland. The forest is mostly made of coniferous trees, part of them having been artificially planted. Its total area is 1240km^{2}, which makes it the second largest forest of Poland (the Lower Silesian Forest ranks first). Until the late Middle Ages, the Solska Forest was connected with another huge complex, the Sandomierz Forest, but deforestation separated these two complexes from each other.

Solska Forest is rich in landscape parks (such as the Puszcza Solska Landscape Park), nature reserves and peat bogs. Main rivers that cross the area are the Tanew, and the Łada and main cities are Biłgoraj, Tomaszów Lubelski and Józefow. The forest is crossed by several routes, including the main national road number 17, which goes from Warsaw, via Lublin, to Lviv. Also, a Zwierzyniec–Bełżec rail line goes through it.

== Sources ==
- nature.poland.pl
- roztocze.net.pl
