= Sian Lowland =

Sian Lowland or Nadsianska Depression (Ukrainian: Надсіанська котловина, romanized: Nadsianska kotlovyna) is a lowland located at the border between Poland and Ukraine along the San River. Most of the region is located in Poland except for a small portion in southeastern end which is in Ukraine.

The lowland is located between Malopolska Upland, Carpathian Foothills, Opillia Upland and Roztochia. To the southeast it extends into Dniester Lowland over the Sian-Dniester Divide.

The Sian Lowland is a tectonic depression along the foothills of the Carpathian Mountains filled in by Miocene strata (up to 300 m (980 ft) thick) covered with glacial and alluvial deposits. It consists of elevated plateaus (the tallest being Tarnohorod) dissected by the valleys of rivers, such as the Tanew River, the Liubachivka River, the Shklo River, and the Vyshnia River. Loess can be found in parts of the plateaus, and dunes are situated in some of its sandy reaches.

A large proportion of the lowland's forests have been cleared out, although pine forests mixed with firs and birches occur in the region's sandy areas, and fir forests mixed with hornbeams and maples grow in its heavier soils.

The lowland has a population density of 80 persons/km^{2}; the population is predominantly (75%) rural.
