= Janów Forests Landscape Park =

Park in southeast Poland

Coordinates: 50.6572°N 22.3536°E

- Park Krajobrazowy Lasy Janowskie (in Polish)
- IUCN category V (protected landscape/seascape)
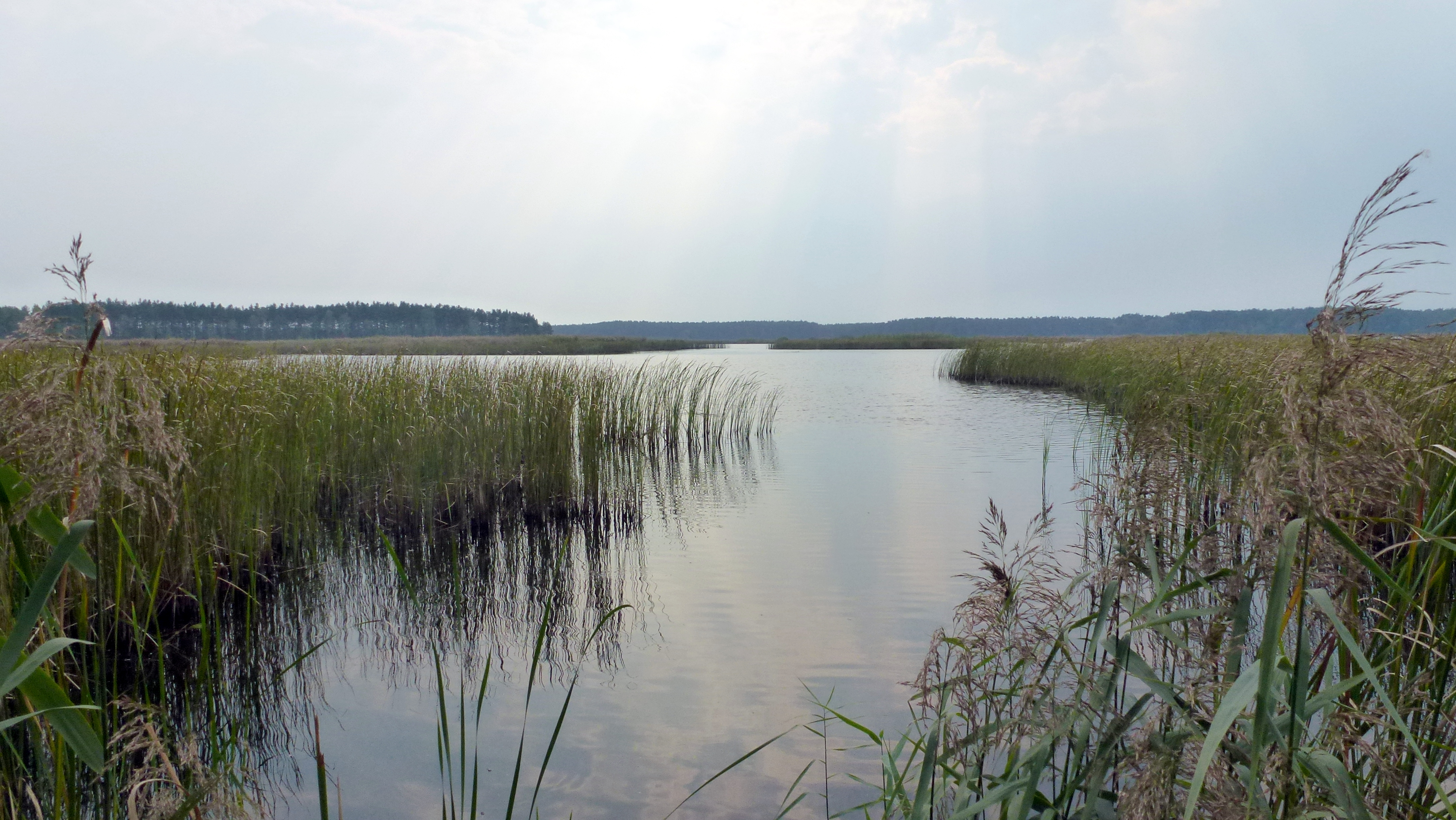
- Pond and wetlands in Imielty Ług nature reserve section.
- Interactive map of Janów Forests Landscape Park
- Location: Lublin Voivodeship and Podkarpackie Voivodeship southeastern Poland
- Area: Park: 39,150 hectares (96,700 acres); Buffer zone: 60,500 hectares (149,000 acres)
- Established: 1984: Polish Landscape Park; 2000: Natura 2000; Special Protection Area

Janów Forests Landscape Park, (Polish: Park Krajobrazowy Lasy Janowskie), is a Polish Landscape Park designated protected area in southeastern Poland.

== Geography ==
The park is within two Polish voivodeships, in northeastern Podkarpackie Voivodeship (Subcarpathian Voivodeship) and southwestern Lublin Voivodeship. It is located north of Rzeszów and south of Lublin.

The park protects 39,150 hectares (151.2 mi^{2}), and has a buffer zone of 60,500 hectares (234 mi^{2}). It was established in 1984.

Janów Forests Landscape Park is a Natura 2000 EU Special Protection Area.

== Features ==
The park's forest landscape is varied, with meandering rivers and streams, meadows, and dune embankments. In drainless depressions with water flow there are vast swamps and peat bogs.

Visitor attractions include cycling, horseback riding, fishing, and Polish folk culture places and events.

The Puszcza Solska Landscape Park is also in the area.

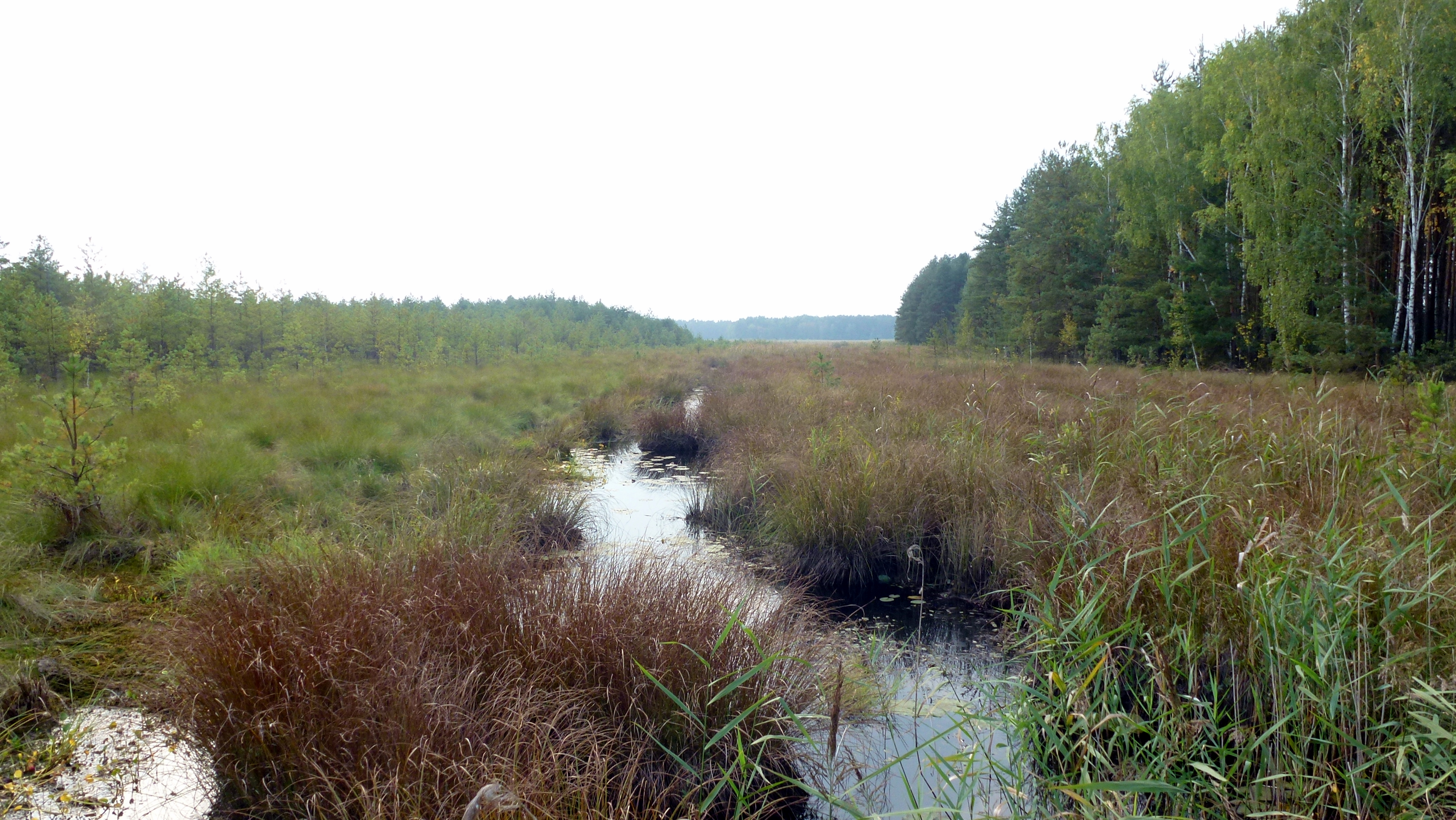
Forest and wetlands in Imielty Ług nature reserve section of the Janów Forests Landscape Park.

=== Ponds and wetlands ===
Large complexes of constructed ponds cover a total of more than 2,000 hectares (4,900 acres) with wetlands and open water. They are 150 years old, with many built on natural swamps, taking advantage of the underground geological formations.

The Imielty Ług nature reserve is at one of the pond complexes within Janów Forests Landscape Park.

== See also ==
- Landscape parks in Poland
- Special Protection Areas in Poland
- Natura 2000 in Poland
