= Roztocze =

Range of hills in Poland and Ukraine

Coordinates: 50°28′34″N 23°16′04″E

- Roztocze (Polish); Розточчя (Ukrainian)
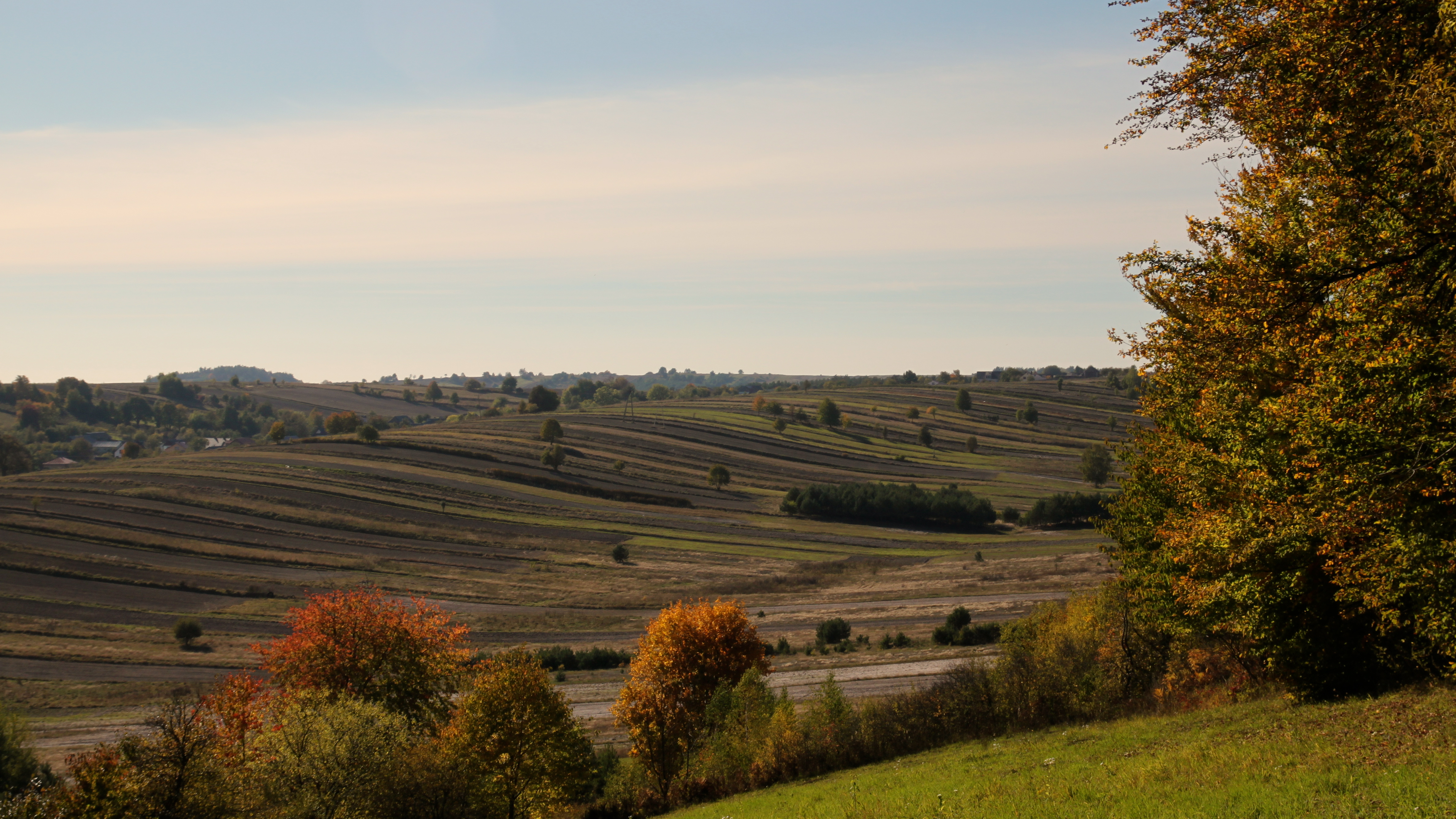
- Undulating hills in Polish Roztocze

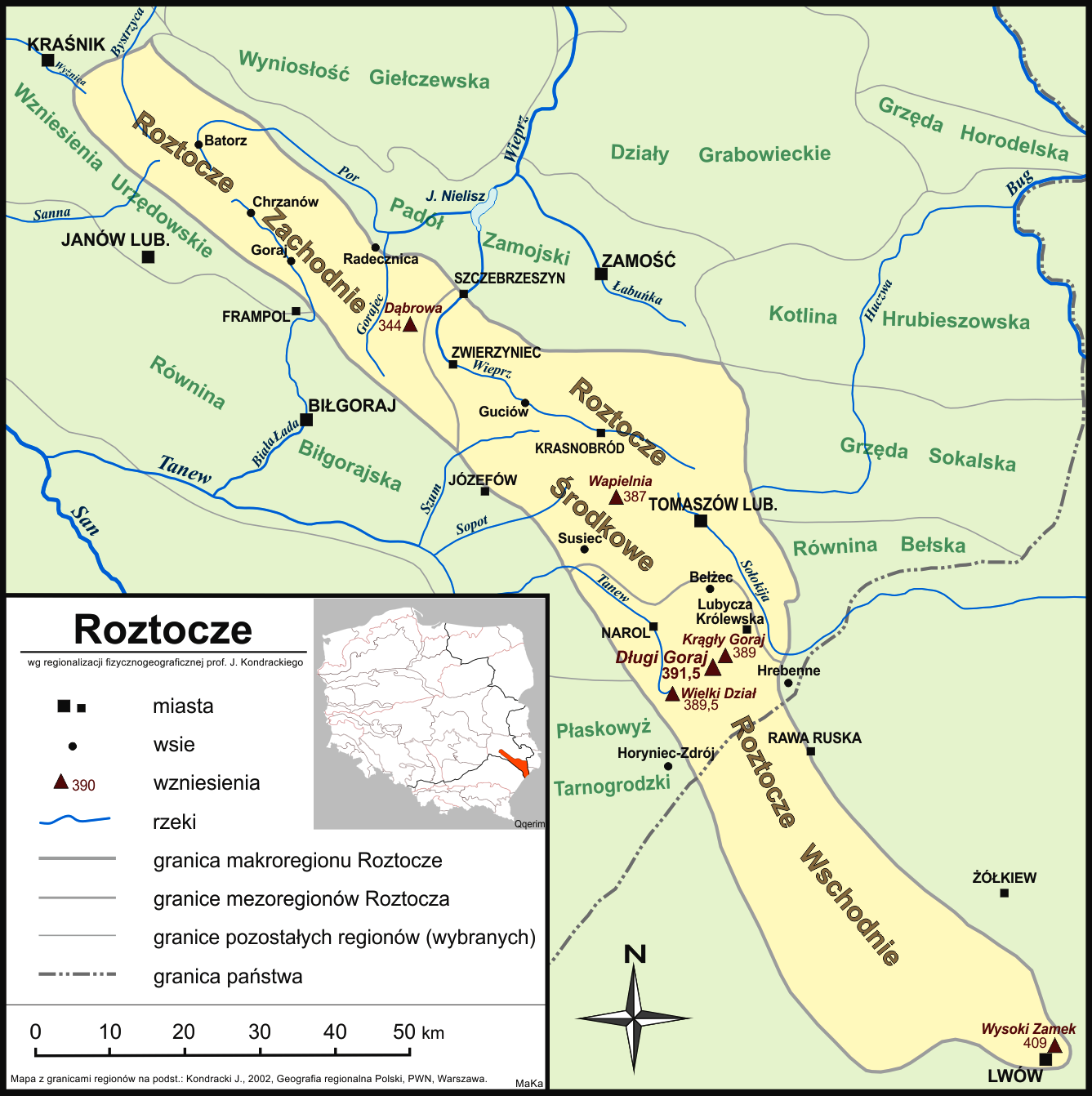
- Detailed map of Roztocze in Poland and Ukraine
- Location: Lublin and Subcarpathian Voivodeships of Poland, Lviv Oblast of Ukraine
- Nearest town: Zwierzyniec, Tomaszów Lubelski
- Area: Approximately 297,000 ha (2,970 km^{2}) across Poland and Ukraine
- Elevation: 390 metres (1,280 ft) in Poland, 409 metres (1,342 ft) in Ukraine
- Designation: UNESCO World Network of Biosphere Reserves

Roztocze or Roztochchia (Ukrainian: Розточчя) is a range of hills in southeastern Poland and western Ukraine which rises from the Lublin Upland and extends southeastward through Solska Forest and across the Polish-Ukrainian border, reaching Lviv. Largely rural and sparsely populated, the elongated range is approximately 180 km long and 14 km wide. Its highest peak within Poland is Wielki Dział at 390 meters, while in Ukraine it is Vysokyi Zamok (Lviv High Castle) at 409 meters. In Poland, Roztocze lies in the Lublin and Subcarpathian Voivodeships, while the section in Ukraine extends to the outskirts of Lviv. In 2011, UNESCO established the Roztochia Biosphere Reserve which in 2019 became a Transboundary Biosphere Reserve. The Polish part of the range constitutes the Roztocze National Park.

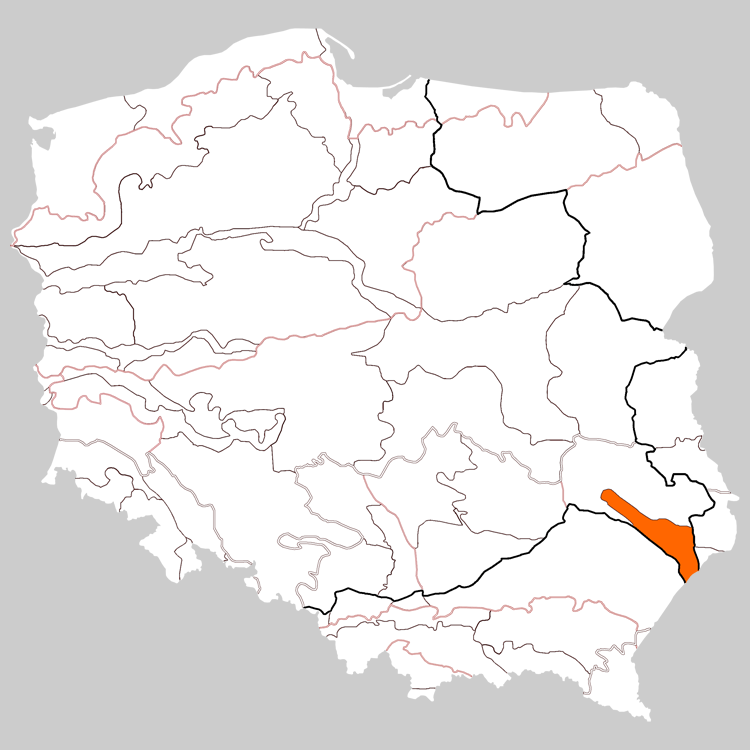
Location of Roztocze (orange) on a map of Poland

== Inhabitation ==
Main cities or towns of the Roztocze range and neighbouring regions include: Biłgoraj, Janów Lubelski, Józefów, Krasnobród, Kraśnik, Lubaczów, Narol, Nemyriv, Szczebrzeszyn, Tomaszów Lubelski, Yavoriv, Zamość, Zhovkva, and Zwierzyniec.

== Geology and geography ==
The Roztocze is a range of hills roughly extending from the southern fringes of Kraśnik in Poland to Lviv in Ukraine. Its formation is closely related to tectonic movements that occurred during the Mesozoic era. In the Cretaceous period (approximately 100 million years ago), this area was the floor of a shallow sea where limestone, marl, and sandstone were deposited. At the end of the Cretaceous, as a result of orogenic movements, this area was uplifted, creating the current geological structures.

Roztochchia is bordered by the Sian Lowland in the southwest and Bug structural basin in the northeast, and has a topographic prominence of 100-150 meters above the surrounding territories. In its northwestern end the range connects with Chełm and Lublin Uplands. The southwestern slopes of Roztochchia are regular and have a step-like structure, meanwhile the northeastern section is more dissected and characterized by butte hills. The range serves as a divide between the basins of San (whose tributaries of Shklo, Vyshnia, liubachivka and Tanva flow from the plateau), Wieprz, Buh (whose tributaries flowing from Roztochchia are Poltva, Rata, Solokiia and Huchva) and Dnister (Vereshchytsia), which also make it a divide between the Baltic and Black Sea drainage basins.

Westerly winds contribute to the high amounts of rainfall on the range, reaching 700 millimeters per year. In terms of flora and fauna Roztocchia represents a border region between Podolia, Polesia and the Carpathians. The range is covered by mixed forests, which take 40% of the whole area; other 30% are used as farmland. Among notable settlements located in Roztochchia are Lviv, Zhovkva, Rava-Ruska, Ivano-Frankove and Nemyriv (on the Ukrainian side of the border), Bełżec, Tomaszów Lubelski, Szczebrzeszyn, Kraśnik and Biłgoraj (on the Polish side).

== Early Human History ==
The first traces of human settlement in the Roztocze region date back to the Paleolithic era. Numerous stone tools found in the area indicate the presence of humans as early as 100,000 years ago. In the Neolithic period (around 6,000 years ago), the first agricultural settlements appeared. During the Roman influence period (1st-4th century AD), the Amber Road, connecting northern Europe with the Roman Empire, passed through Roztocze.

== Medieval and Modern History ==
In the Middle Ages, Roztocze was a battleground between various tribes. In the 10th century, the area was incorporated into the Polish Piast state, but later found itself within the borders of the Kievan Rus'. In the 14th century, after the conquests of Casimir the Great, Roztocze was annexed by the Kingdom of Poland. During this period, numerous defensive castles were built, such as the castles in Szczebrzeszyn and Zamość, to protect the region from incursions. In the 17th century, Roztocze became part of the Polish–Lithuanian Commonwealth, and after the partitions of Poland (1772–1795), it was divided between Austria, Prussia, and Russia. In the 19th century, the region experienced dynamic economic development, primarily due to the construction of railways and the development of the oil industry in Galicia.

== 20th Century: Wars and Resettlements ==
In the interwar period (1918–1939), Roztocze was part of the Second Polish Republic and became a popular holiday destination. During World War II, the region was the site of intense fighting and partisan operations. After the war, due to border shifts, Roztocze was divided between Poland and Soviet Ukraine. Mass resettlements and expulsions took place during this period, in particular due to multiculturalism of the region and remaining partisan activity. As part of Operation Vistula (1947), thousands of ethnic Ukrainians, Lemkos, Boykos, and Hutsuls were forcibly resettled from southeastern Poland to the so-called Recovered Territories in the western parts of the country. Simultaneously, Poles from the Eastern Borderlands (now constituting Ukraine, Belarus, and Lithuania) were resettled to the Recovered Territories in Poland.

== Roztocze National Park ==
Roztocze National Park, established in 1974, is one of the most important protected areas in Poland. It encompasses a variety of ecosystems, including forests, meadows, wetlands (peat bogs), lakes and rivers. The park is home to many species of plants and animals, including rare and protected species such as the wildcat, wolf, lesser spotted eagle, and many others.

== Points of interest in Roztocze region ==
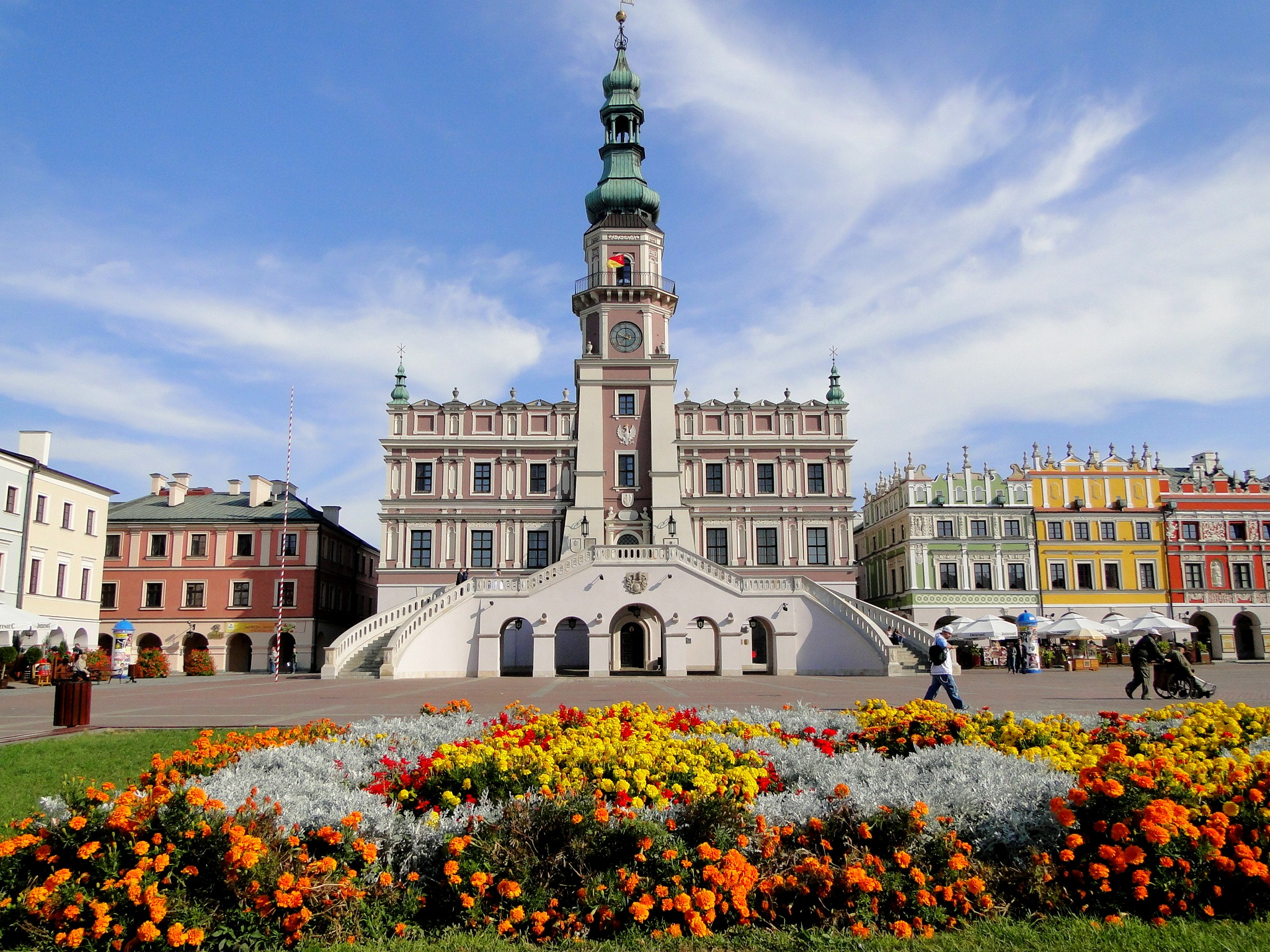
Market Square in the nearby city of Zamość, Poland

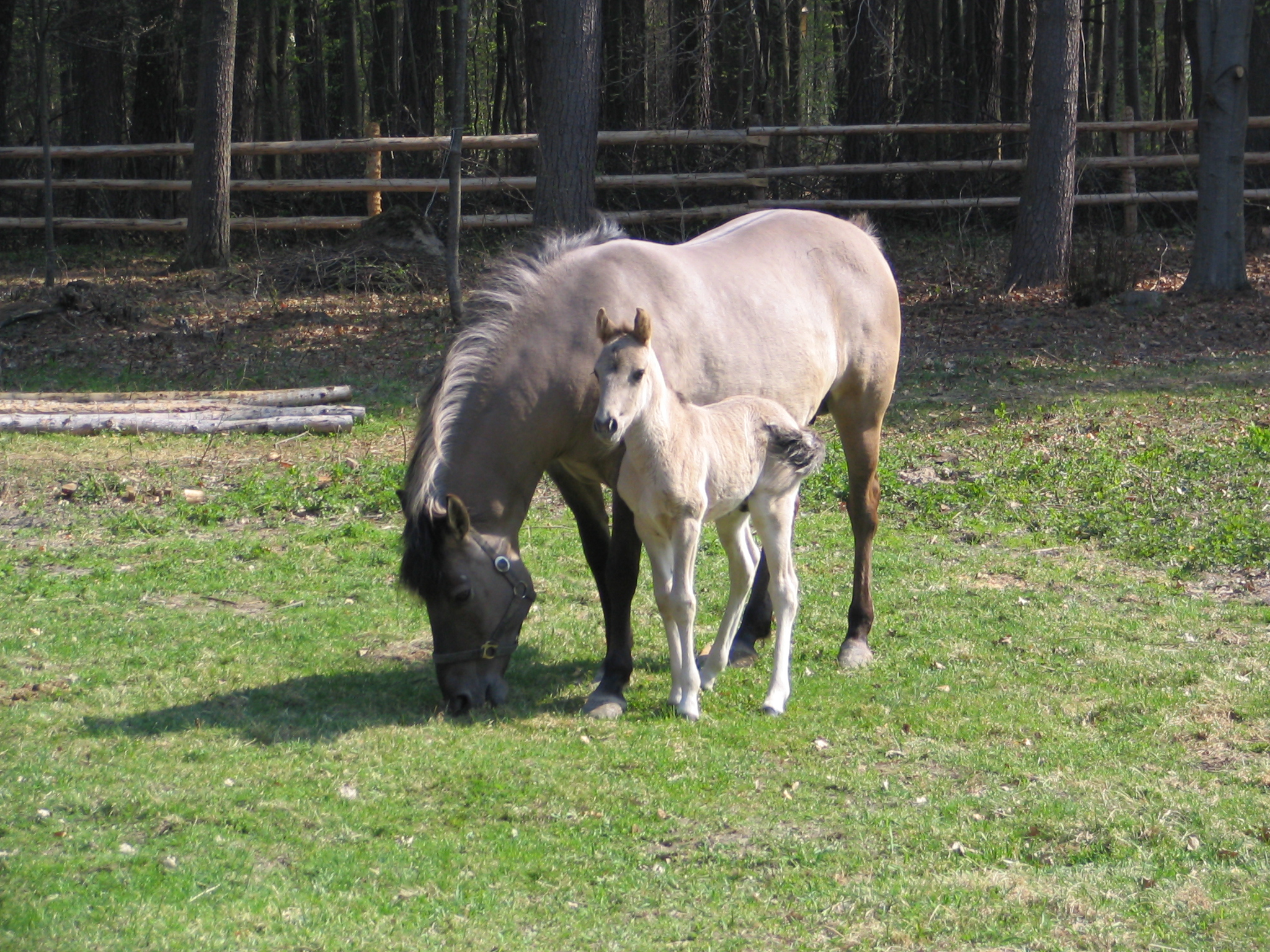
Polish ponies in the Roztocze National Park

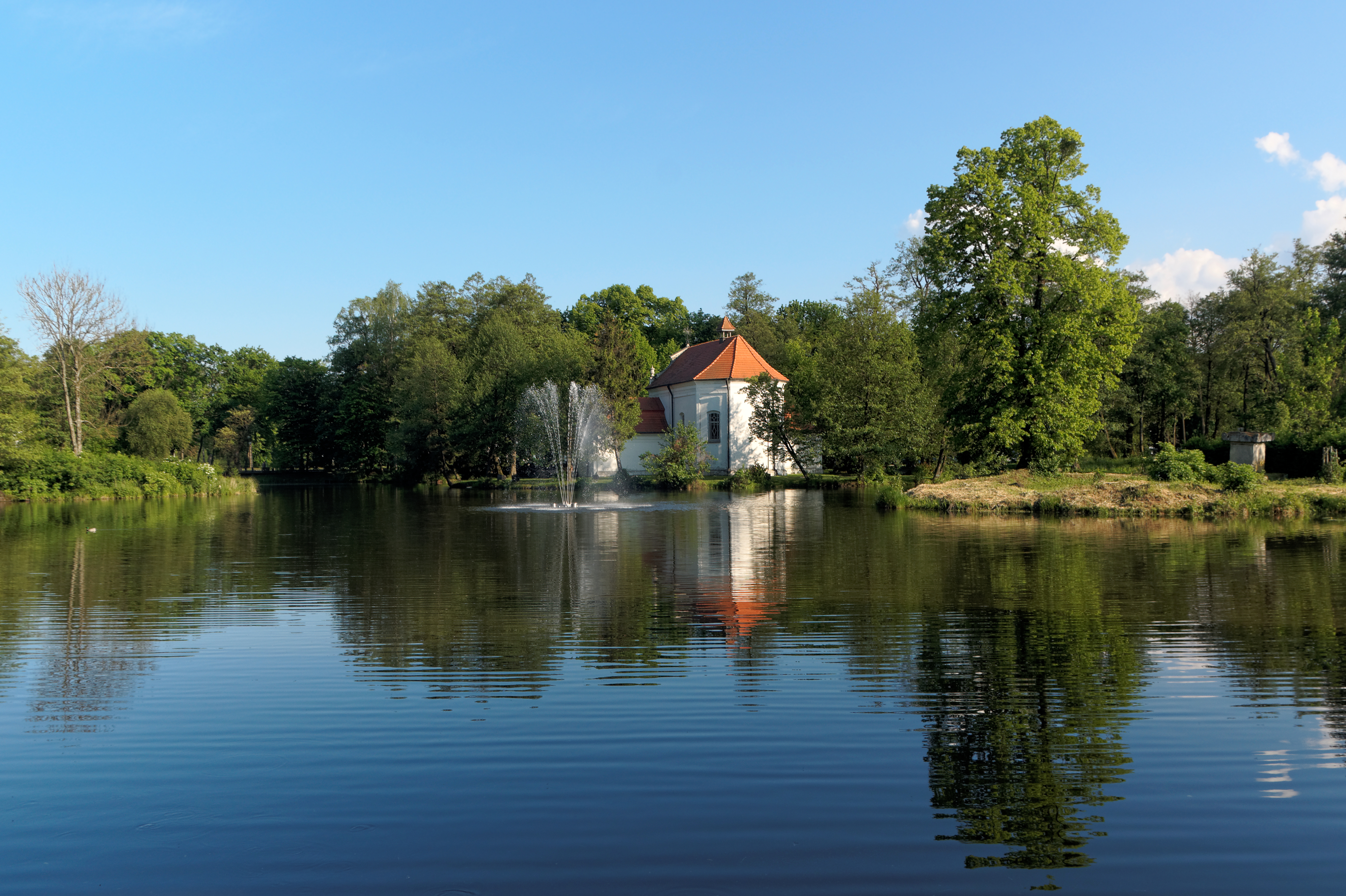
A pond with a church on an island, Zwierzyniec

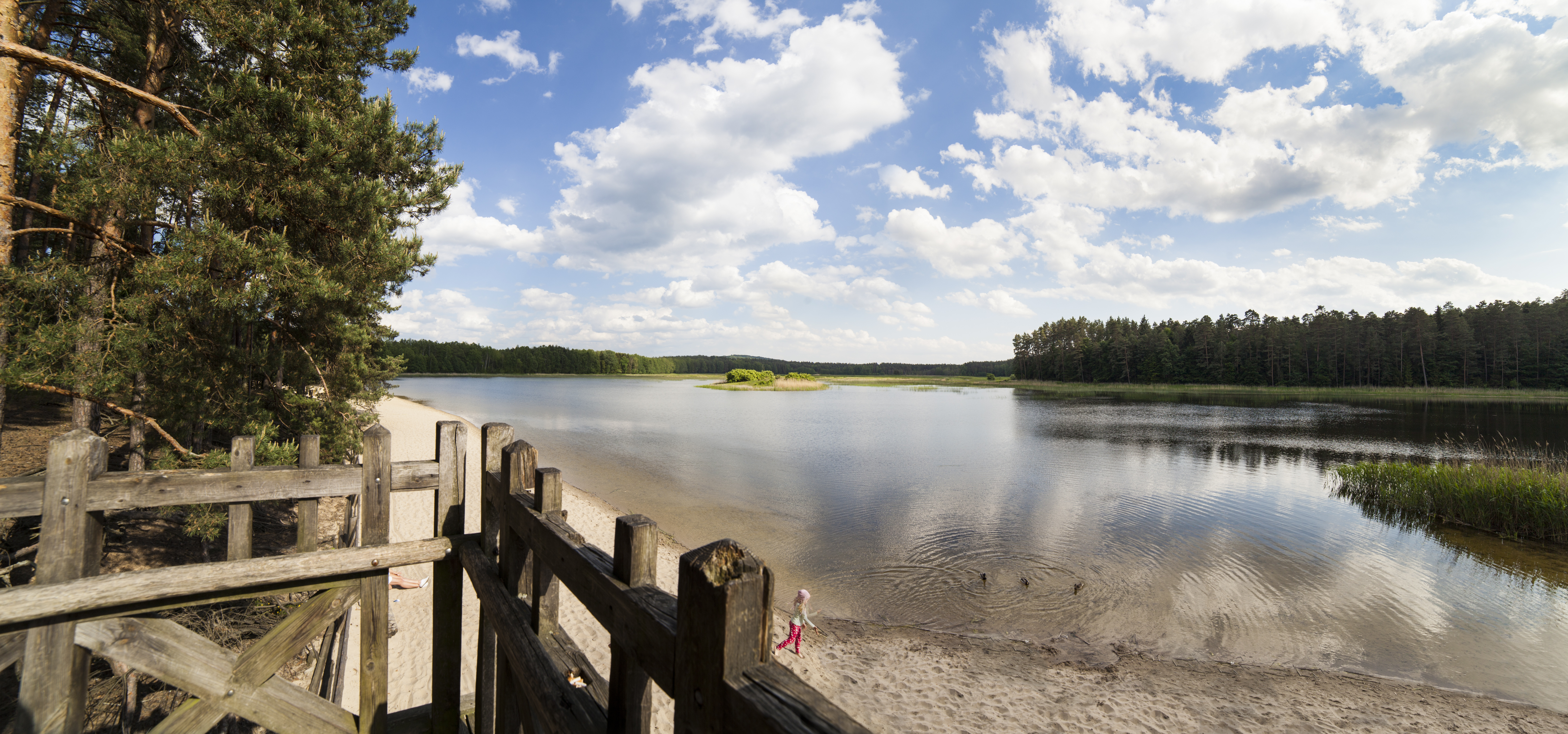
Echo artificial lake in Zwierzyniec

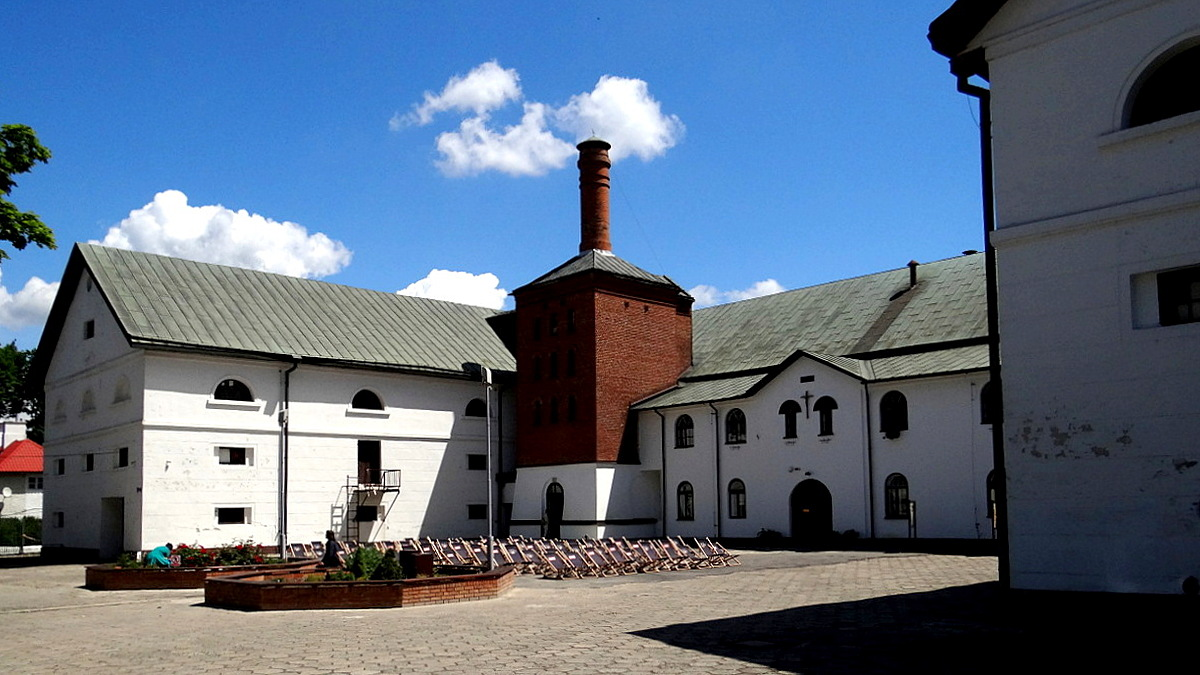
The Zwierzyniec Brewery building

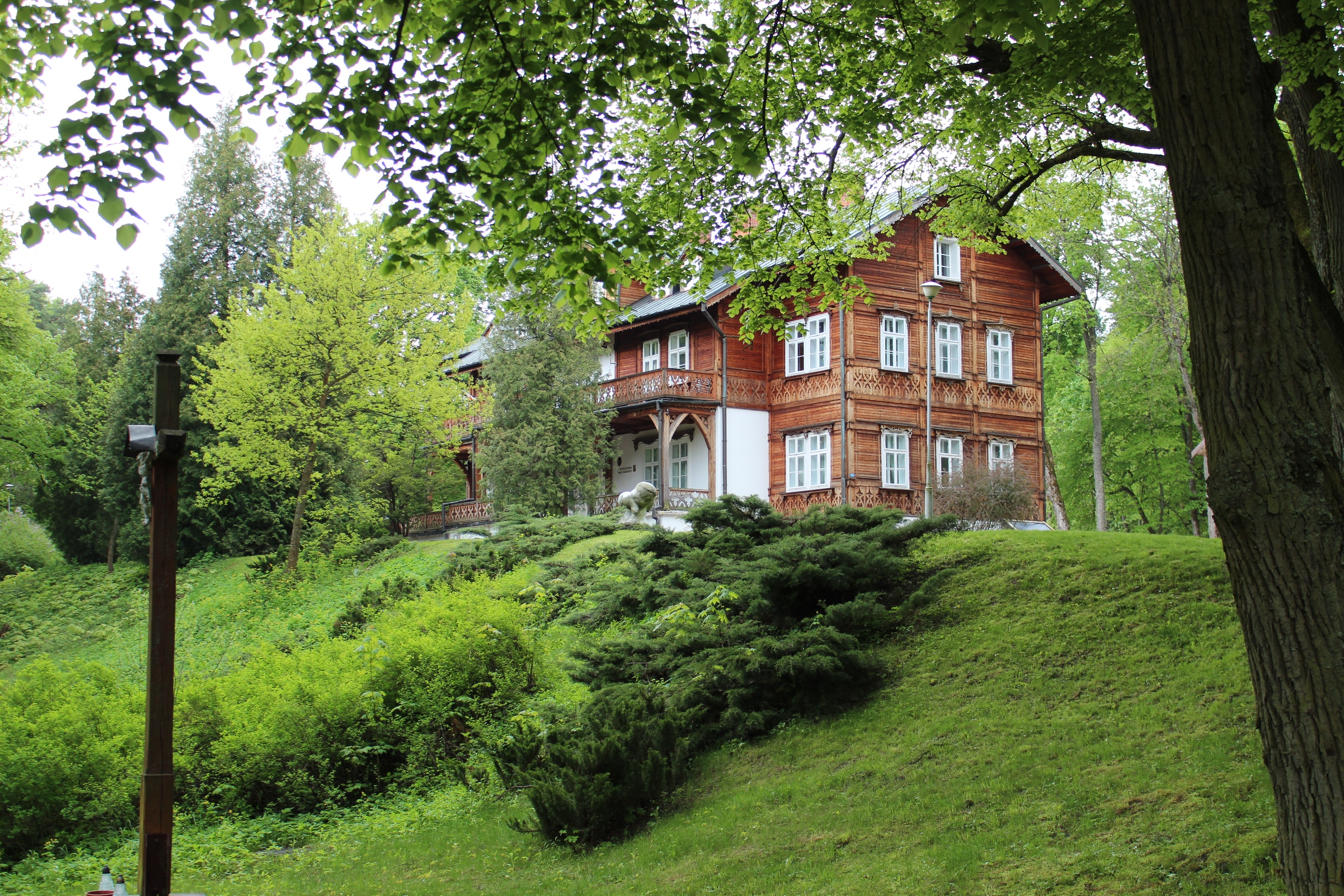
Head office of the Roztocze National Park Management

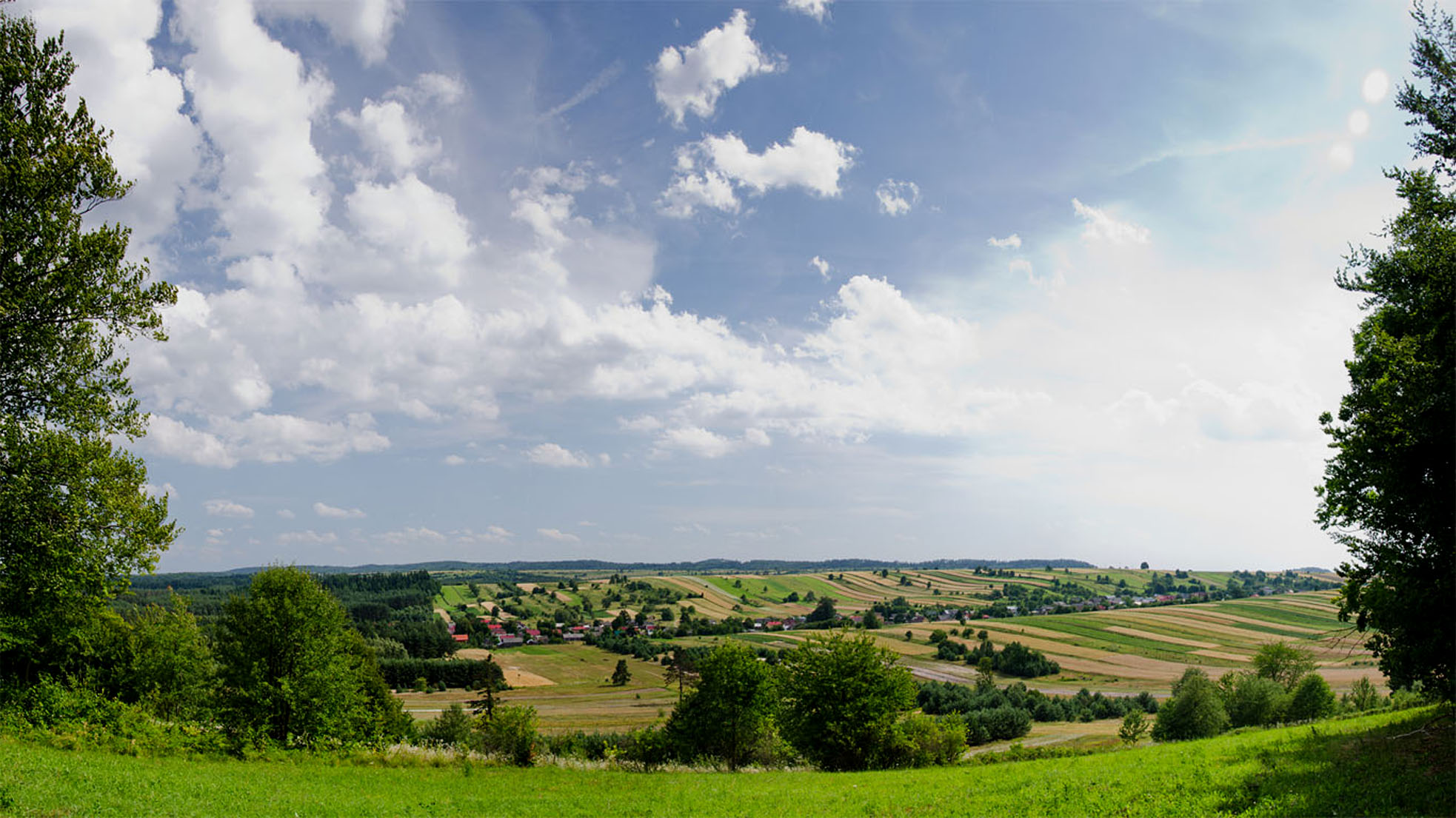
View from Bukowa Góra, Poland

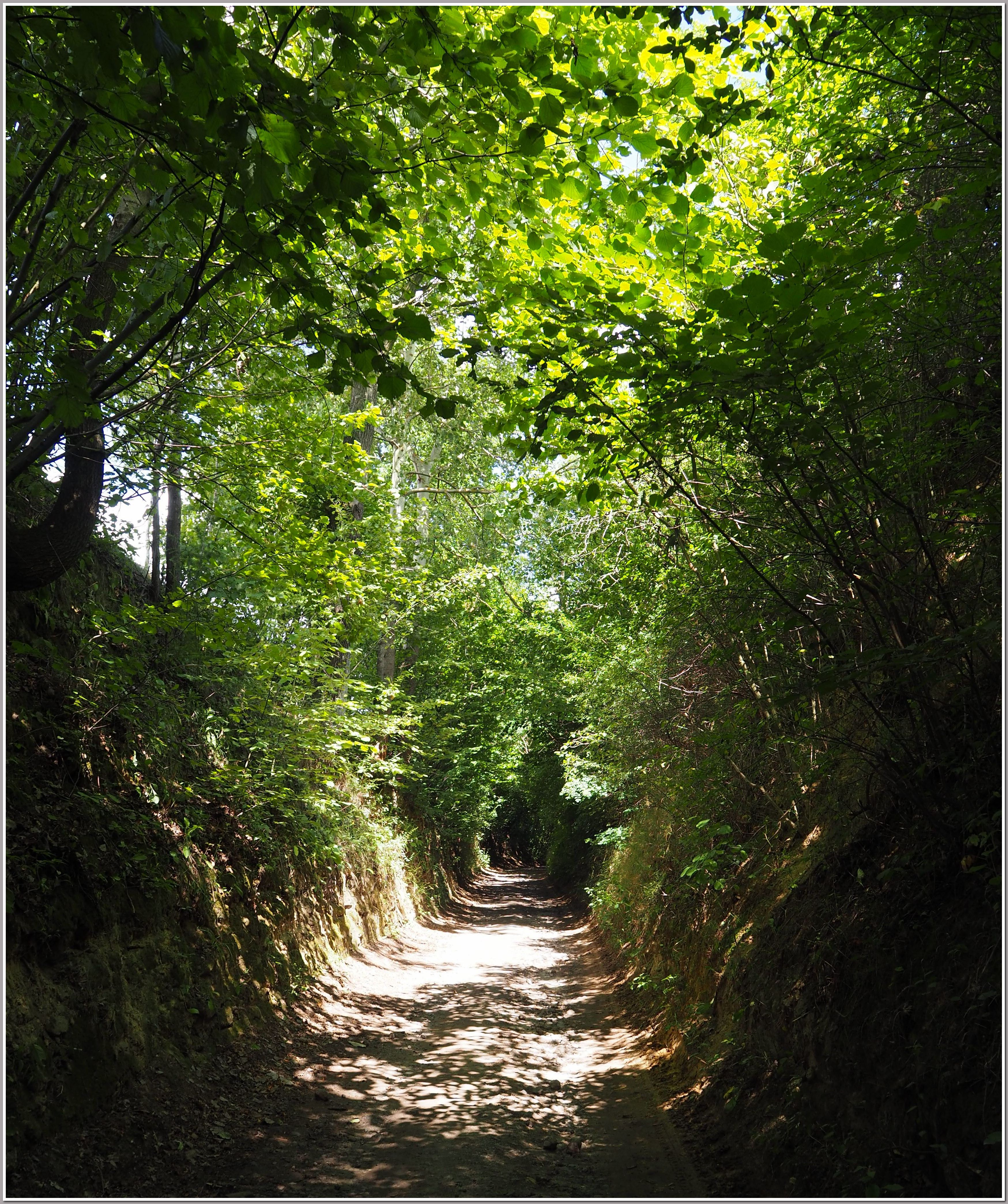
A gully passage

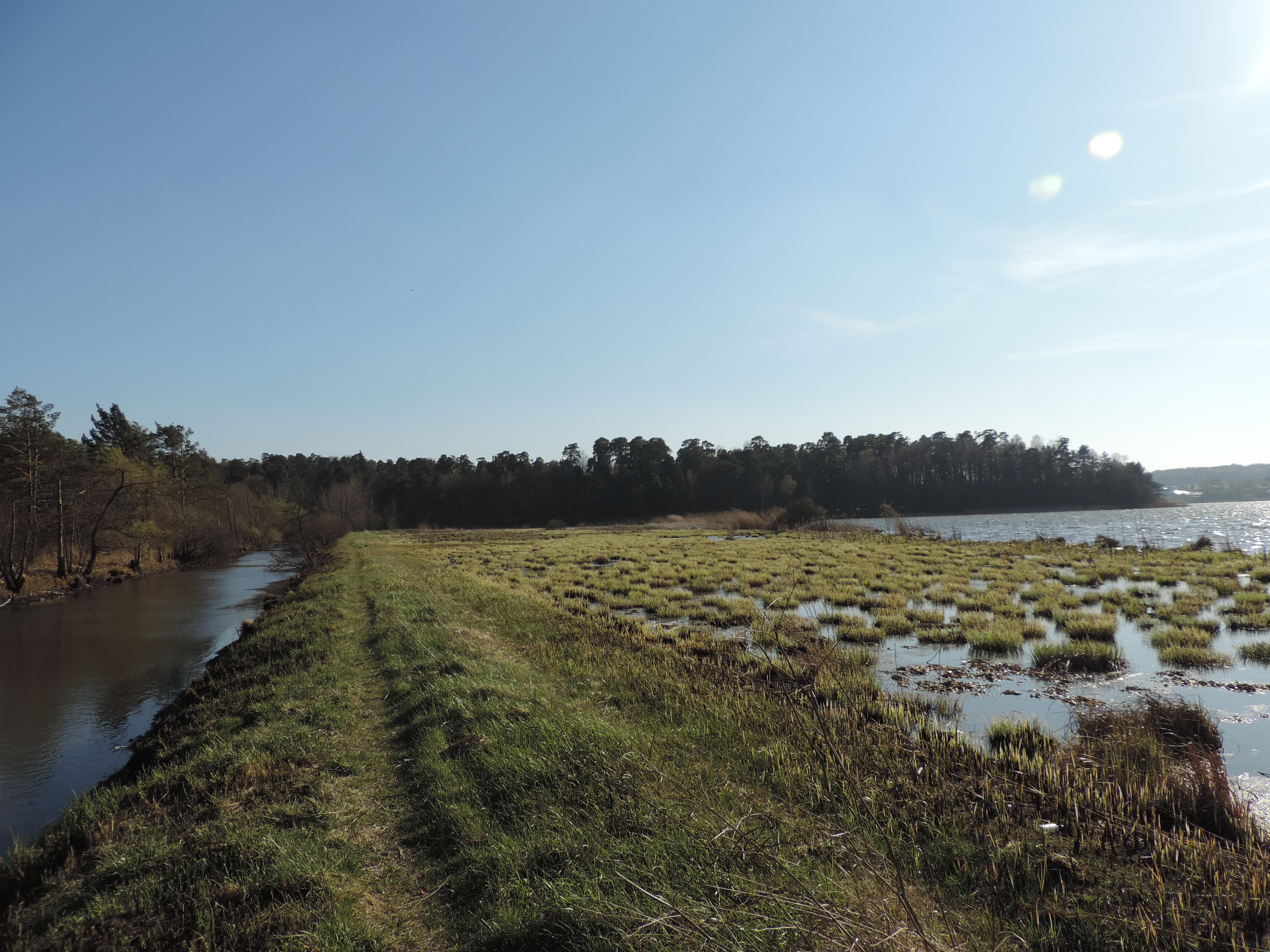
Wetlands near Yavoriv, Ukraine

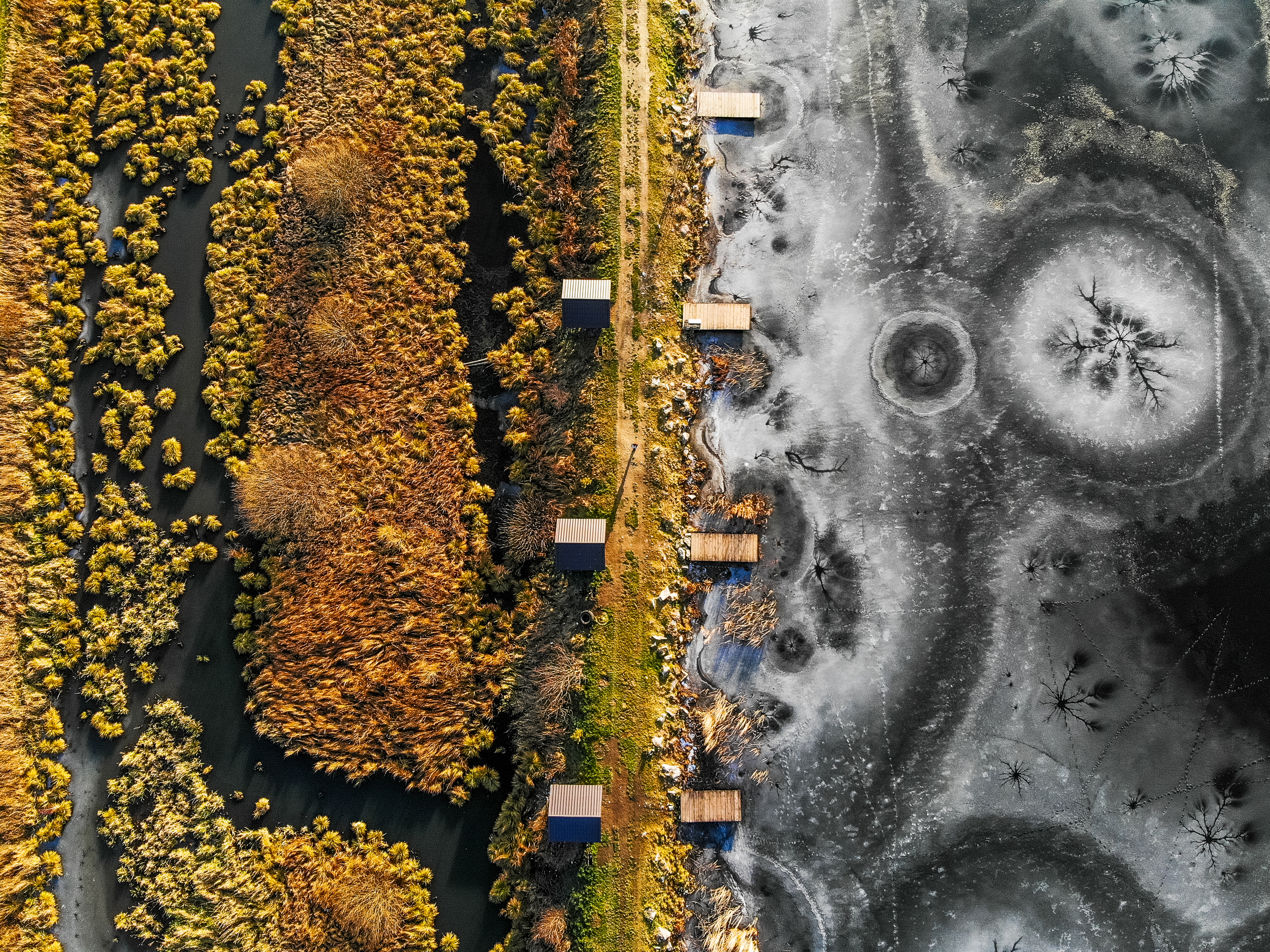
Roztochia Biosphere Reserve, Ukraine

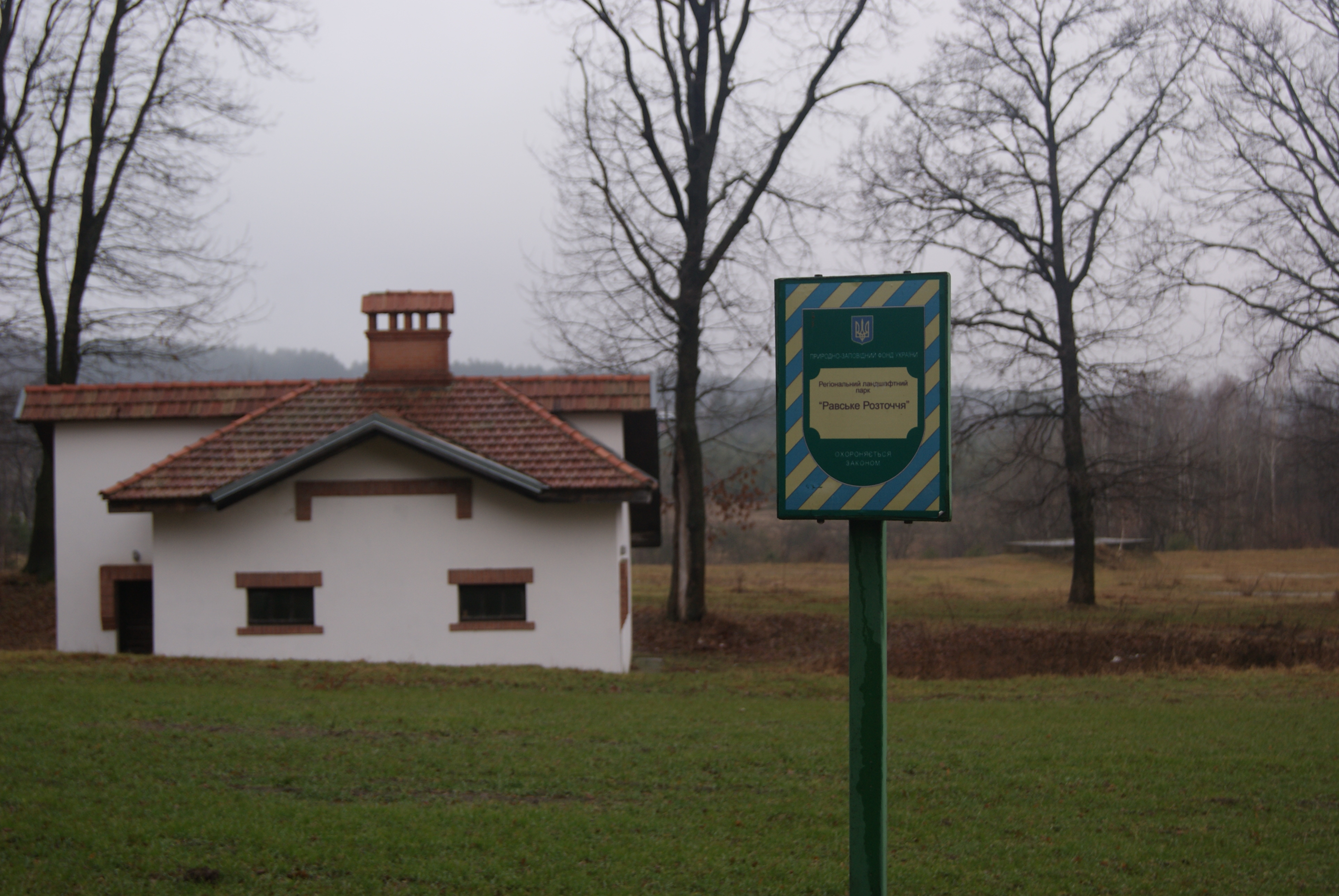
Roztochchia landscape near Rava

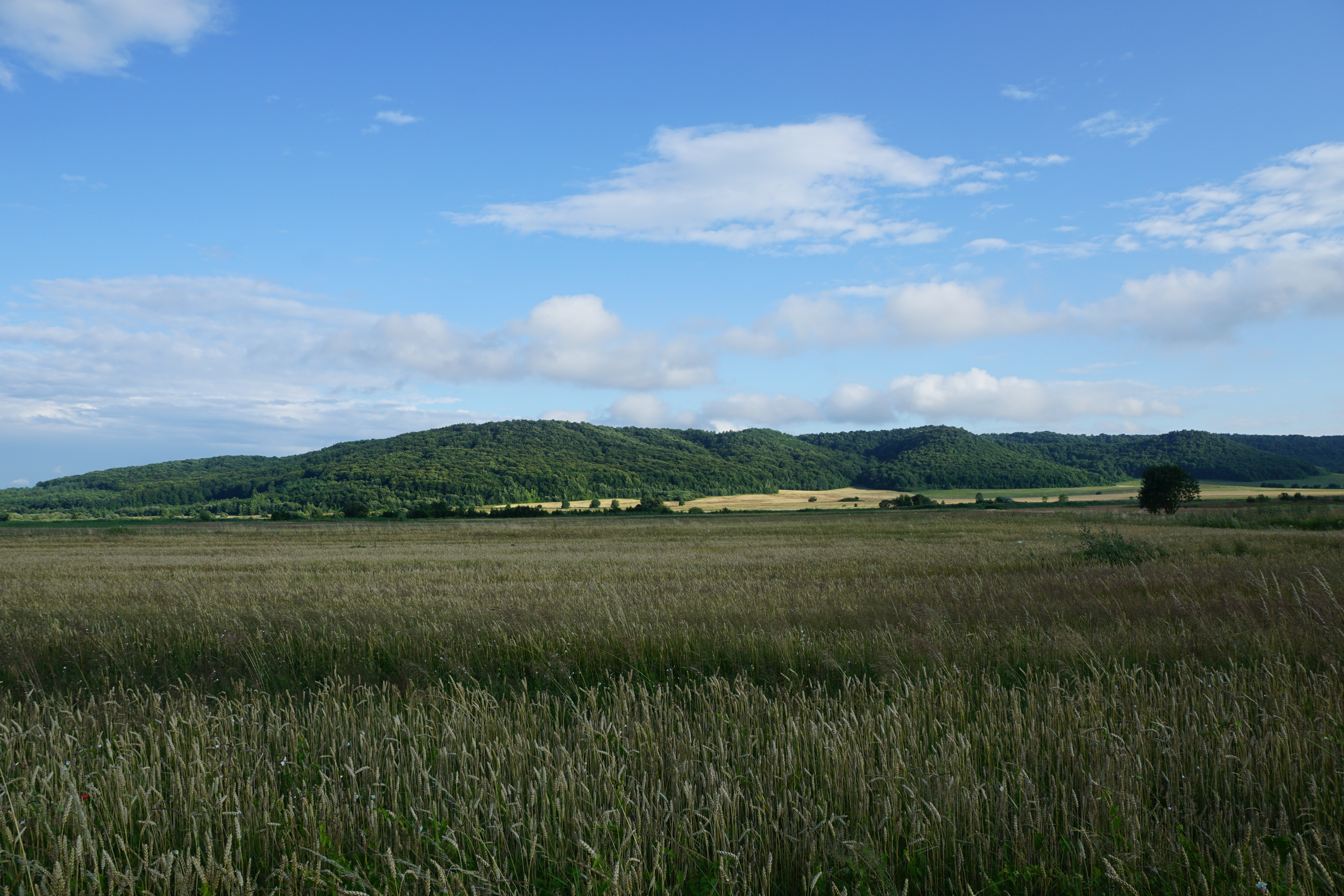
Roztochchia landscape near Krekhiv

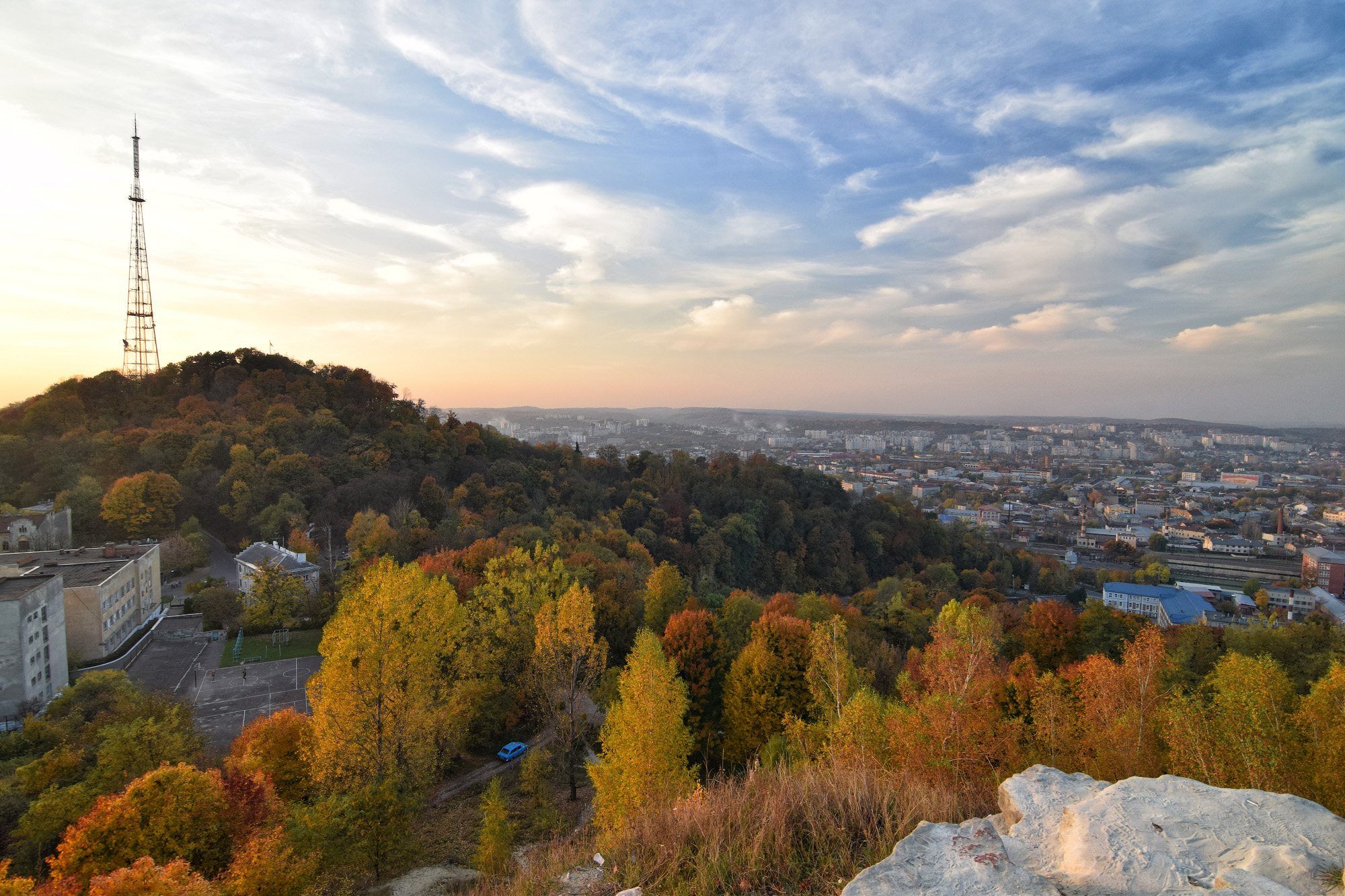
View of Lviv High Castle
