= Hamernia =

- Village
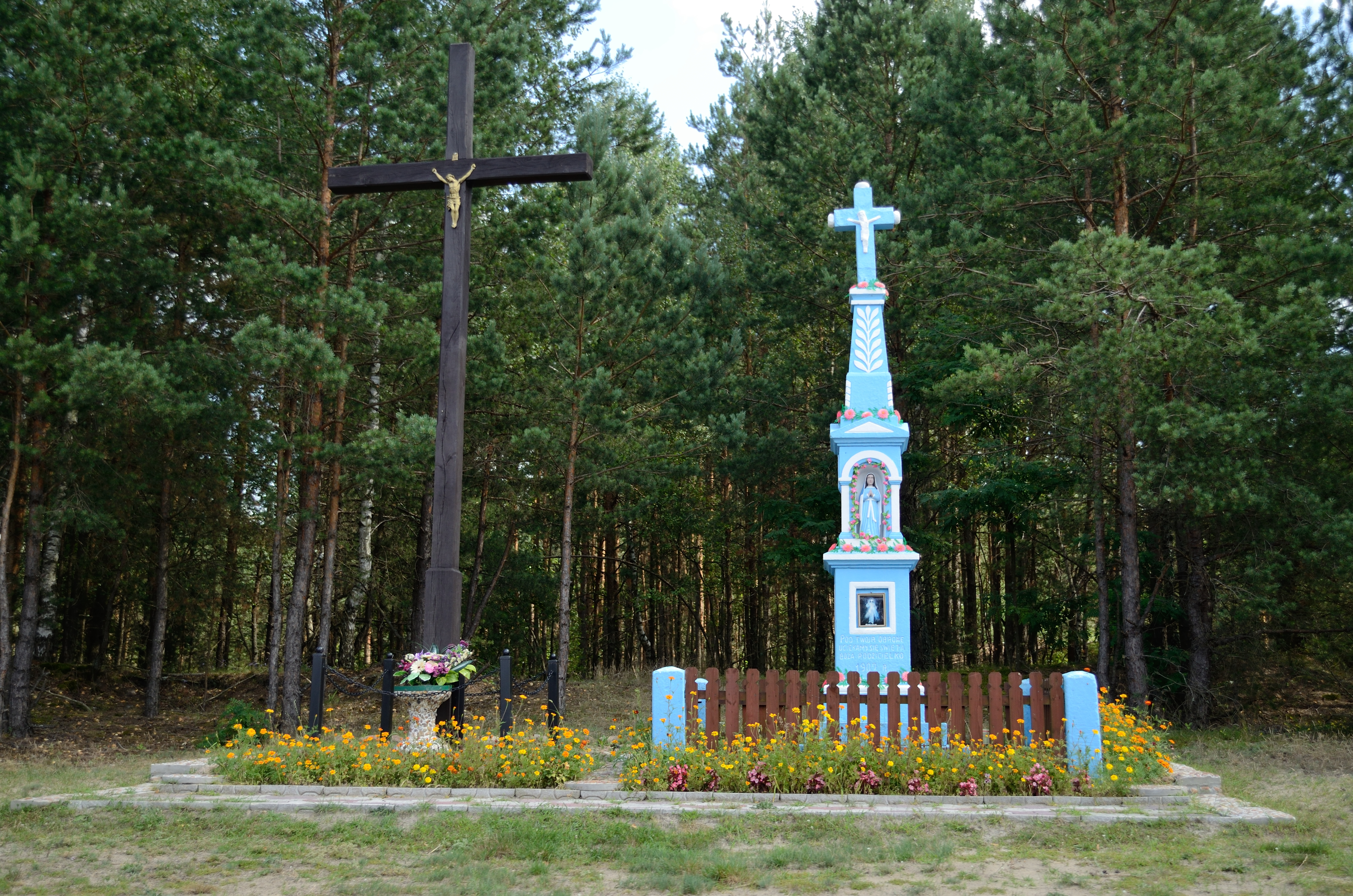

- Location within Poland
- Coordinates: 50°28′N 23°7′E
- Country: Poland
- Voivodeship: Lublin
- County: Biłgoraj
- Gmina: Józefów

Population
  - Total: 343
- Time zone: UTC+1 (CET)
  - Summer (DST): UTC+2 (CEST)

Hamernia [xaˈmɛrɲa] is a village in the administrative district of Gmina Józefów, within Biłgoraj County, Lublin Voivodeship, in eastern Poland.

== History ==
12 Polish citizens were murdered by Nazi Germany in the village during World War II.

During the Polish census of 2011, the village was measured to have 343 inhabitants and was the fourth largest village in Gmina Józefów.
