= Osuchy =

- Village
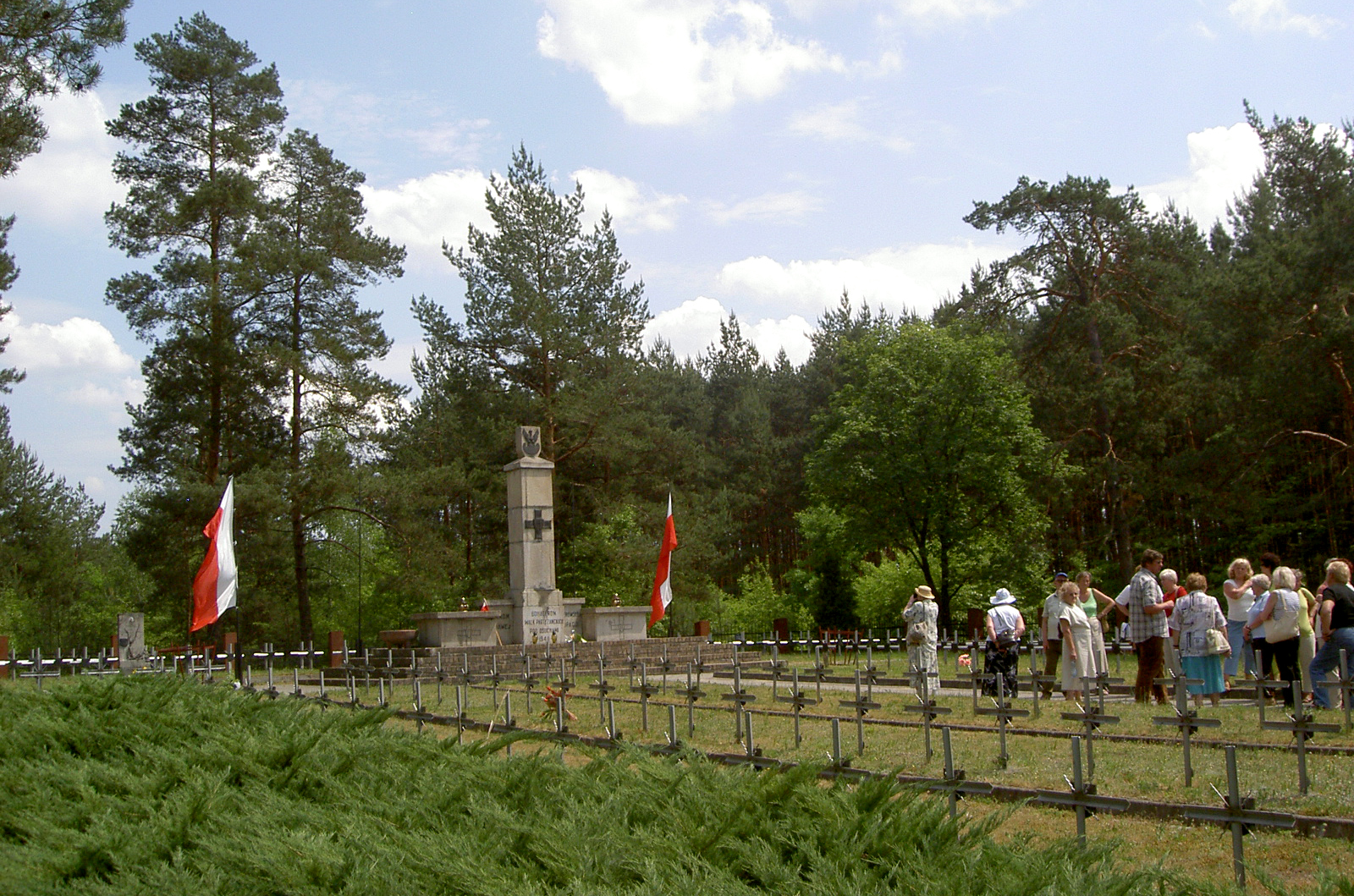

- Location within Poland
- Coordinates: 50°24′5″N 22°57′41″E
- Country: Poland
- Voivodeship: Lublin
- County: Biłgoraj
- Gmina: Łukowa

Population
  - Total: 155

Osuchy [ɔˈsuxɨ] is a village in the administrative district of Gmina Łukowa, within Biłgoraj County, Lublin Voivodeship, in eastern Poland.

During World War II the battle of Osuchy took place nearby.
