= Puszcza Solska Landscape Park =

Park in Poland

Coordinates: 50°23′N 23°06′E

- Park Krajobrazowy Puszczy Solskiej
- IUCN category V (protected landscape/seascape)
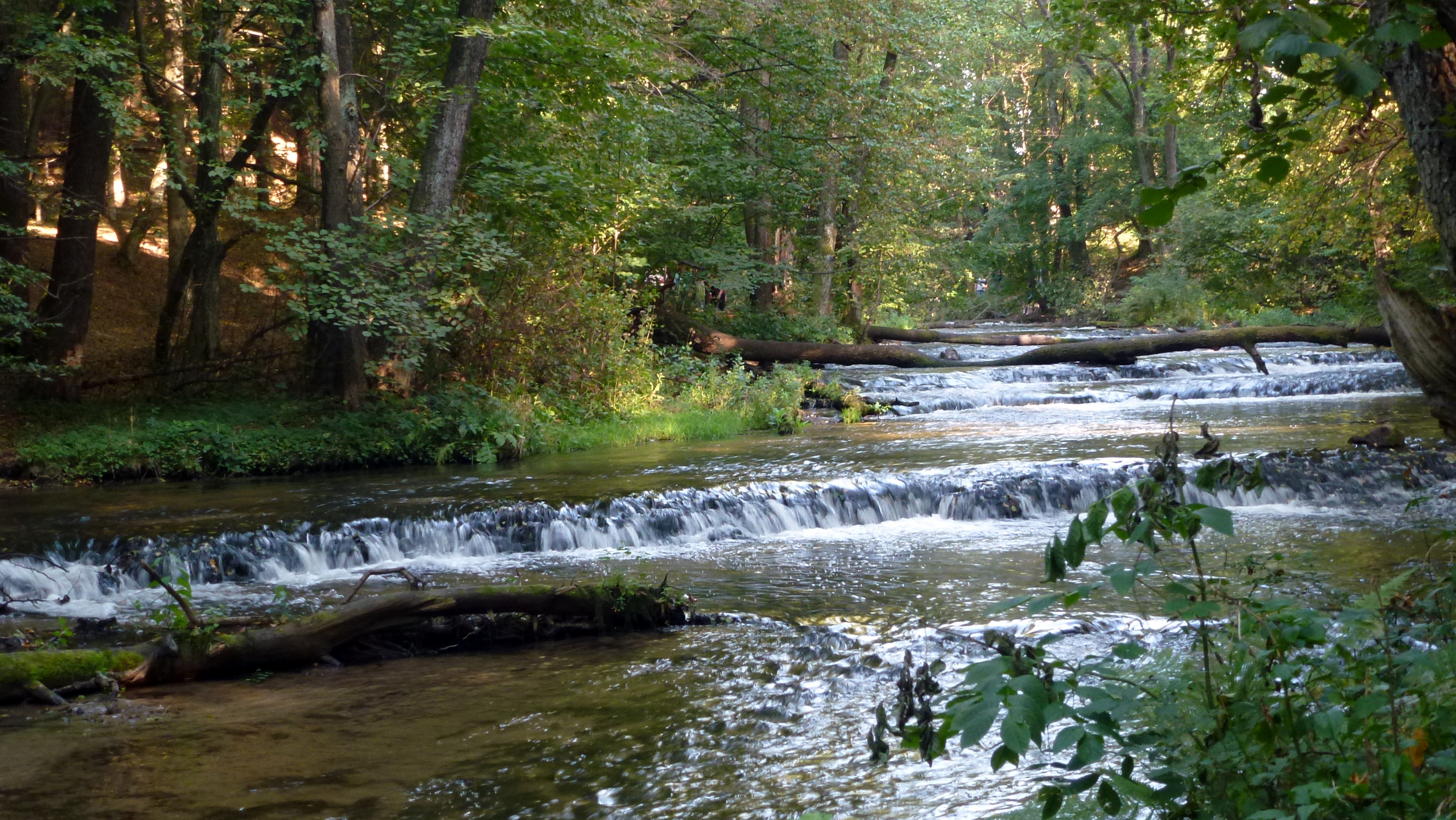
- Nad Tanwią nature reserve
- Interactive map of Puszcza Solska Landscape Park
- Location: Lublin Voivodeship, and Podkarpackie Voivodeship (Subcarpathian Voivodeship), southeastern Poland
- Area: 289.80 km^{2} (111.89 sq mi)
- Established: 1988

Puszcza Solska Landscape Park, also known as Solska Forest Landscape Park (Park Krajobrazowy Puszczy Solskiej), is a Polish Landscape Park protected area in southeastern Poland. Established in 1988, the nature park protects an area of 289.80 square kilometres (111.89 sq mi).

Puszcza Solska contains several distinct nature reserves for wildlife preservation, including Czartowe Pole, Nad Tanwią, Szum, Bukowy Las, Obary, and Przecinka. There are three separate and protected zones, including the Solska Wilderness Area.

== Geography ==
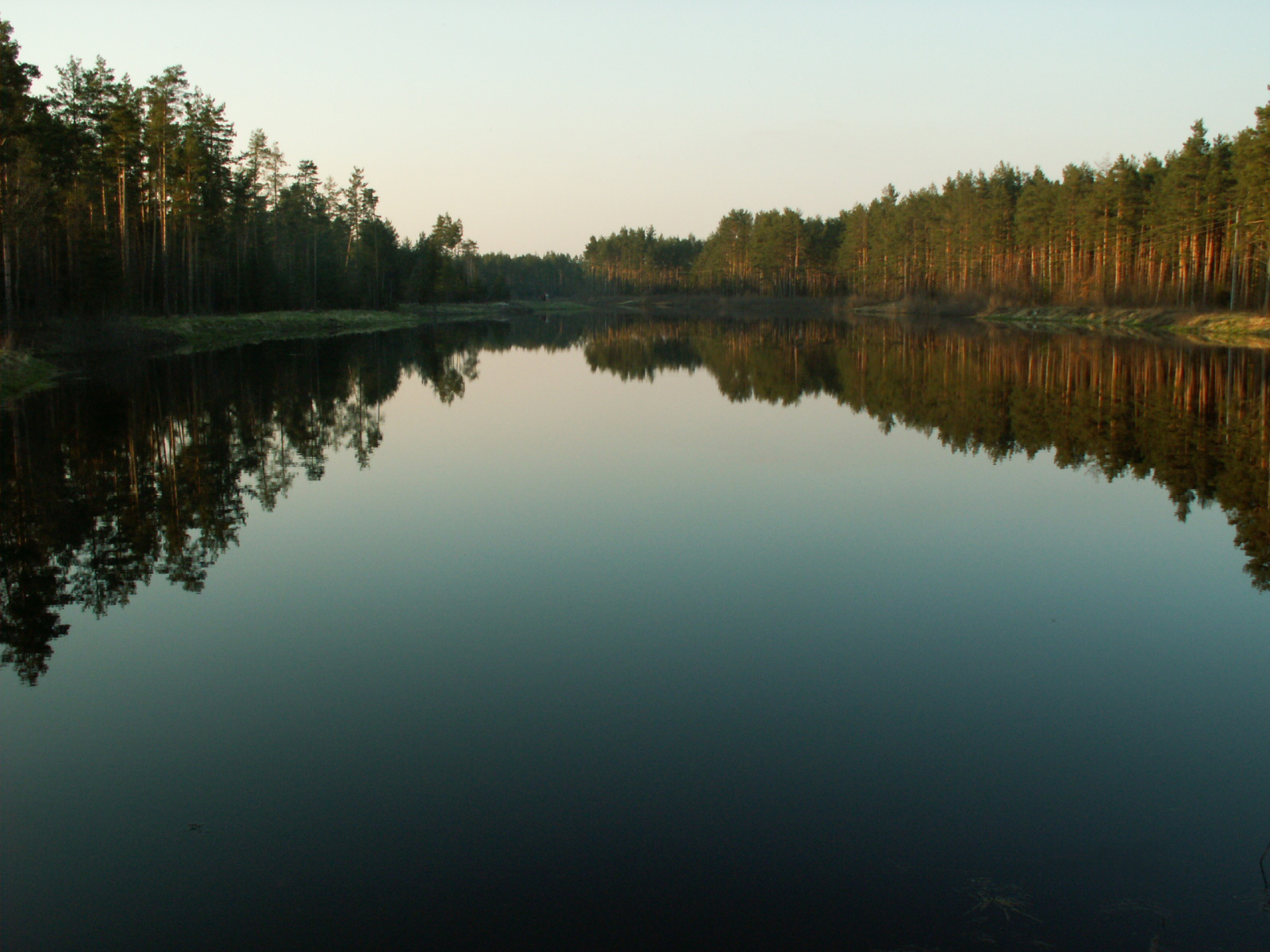
Szum River in the Solska Wilderness Area of Puszcza Solska Landscape Park.

The parkland of Puszcza Solska stretches across seven municipalities in three counties of two provinces of Poland. Within the Lublin Province this includes the municipalities of Aleksandrów, Józefów, Łukowa, and Obsza in Biłgoraj County and the municipality of Susiec in Tomaszów County. Within the Podkarpackie Province this includes the municipalities of Cieszanów and Narol in Lubaczów County.

== See also ==
- Landscape parks in Poland
- Special Protection Areas in Poland
- Natura 2000 in Poland
