= Tanew =

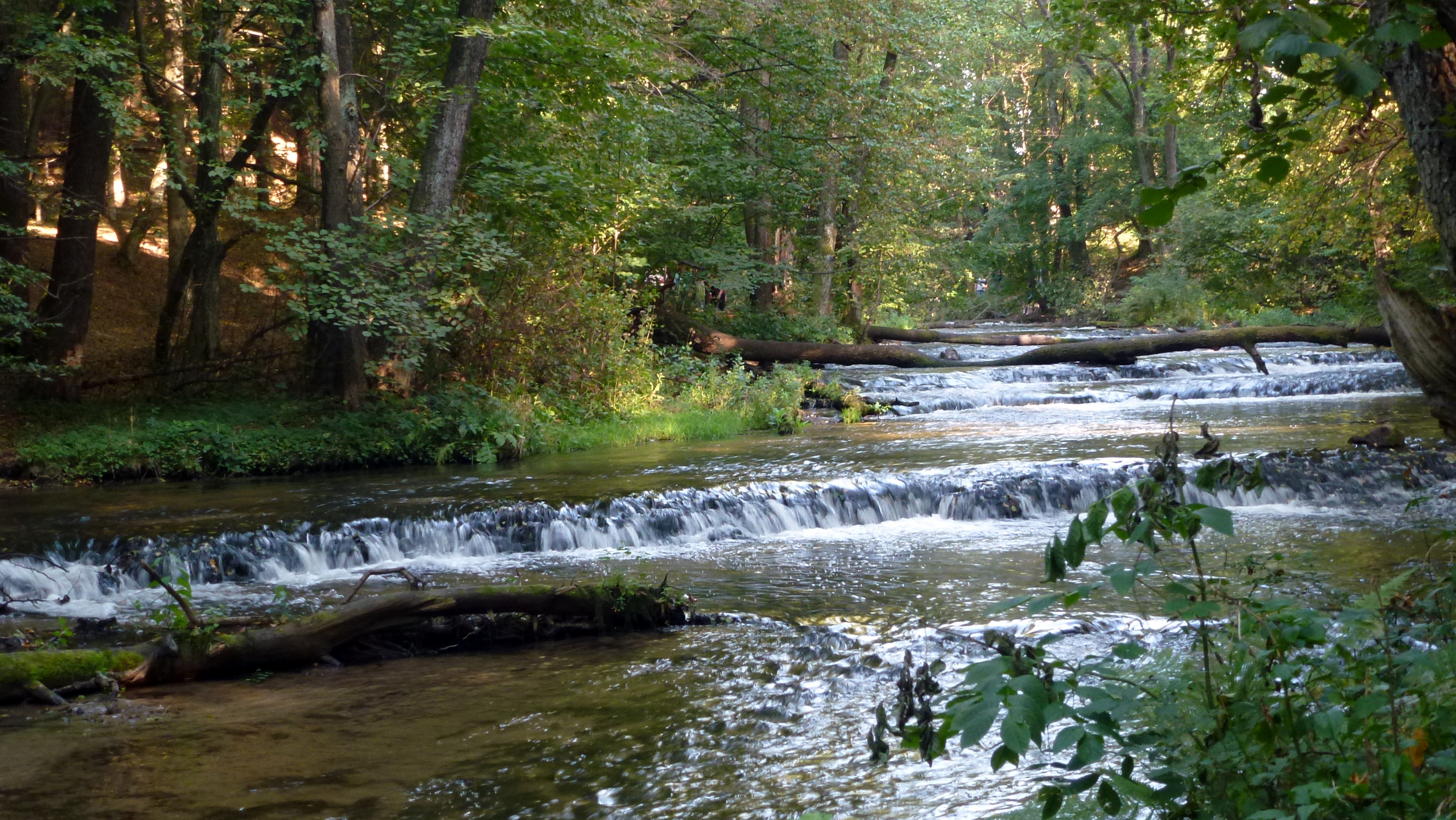
- Nad Tanwią nature reserve

Location
- Country: Poland

Physical characteristics
- Mouth
  - location: San
  - coordinates: 50°29′34″N 22°15′28″E
- Length: 114 km (71 mi)

Basin features
- Progression: San→ Vistula→ Baltic Sea

Tanew is a river in south-east Poland, a tributary of San. It starts in Roztocze hills. Tanew has a length of about 114 km and its catchment area is 2,339 km^{2}. Its tributaries are: Potok Łosiniecki (R), Jeleń (R), Sopot (R), Szum (R), Łada (R), Wirowa (L), Lubienia (L), Złota Nitka (L), Łazowna (L), and Borowina (L).
