= Majdan Stary massacre =

- Part of Occupation of Poland (1939–1945)
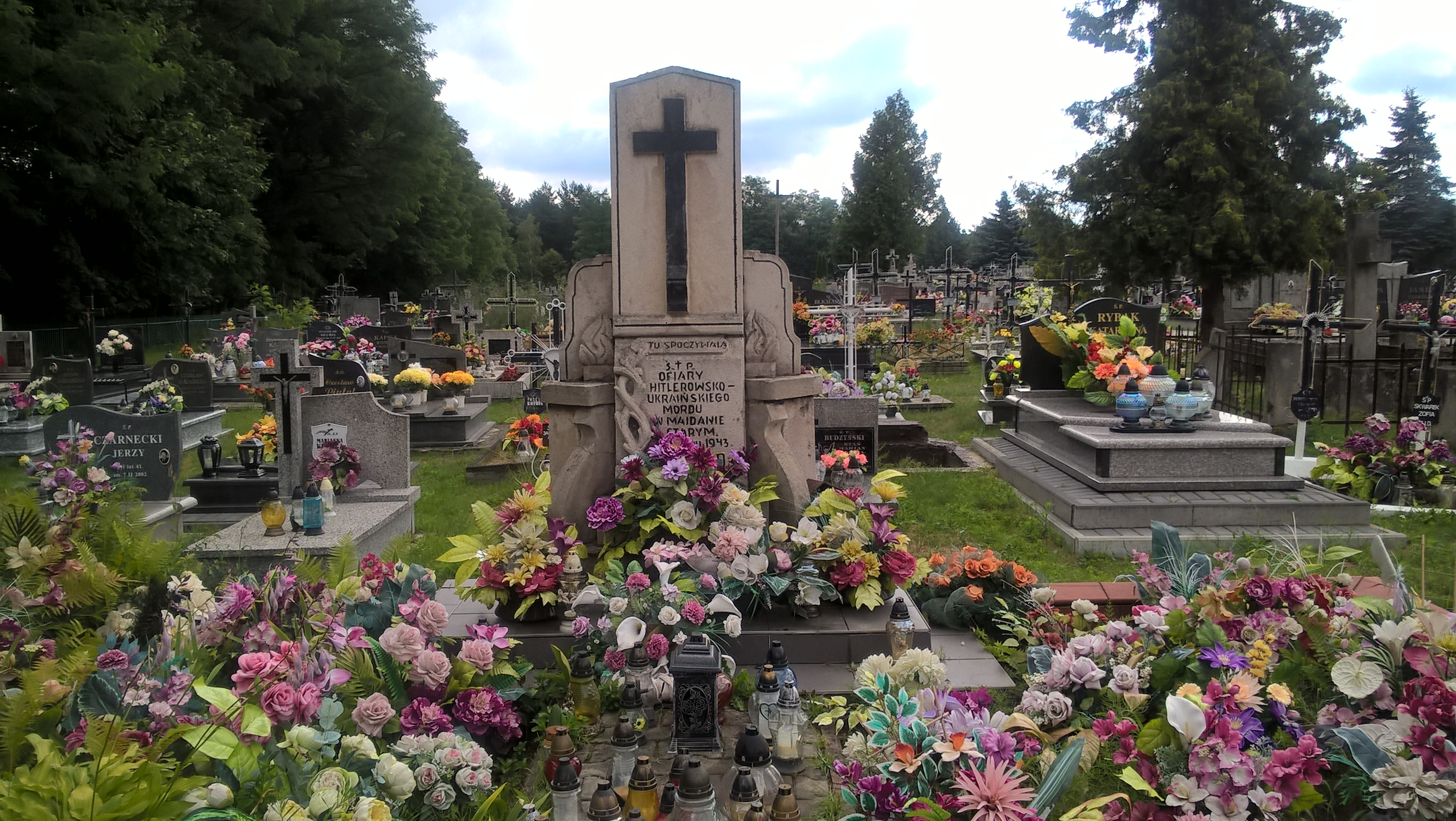
- Mass grave at cemetery in Majdan Stary, where victims of the massacre were buried
- Location: 50°28′19″N 22°41′56″E; Majdan Stary, Poland
- Date: July 3, 1943
- Target: Village inhabitants
- Attack type: War crime
- Deaths: 75
- Perpetrators: Schutzstaffel, Ukrainian or Soviet collaborators

The Majdan Stary massacre was a Nazi war crime perpetrated by the Schutzstaffel and its Ukrainian or Soviet collaborators in the village of Majdan Stary within occupied Poland. Taking place on July 3, 1943, this pacification operation resulted in the deaths of an estimated 75 residents, including women and children. This atrocity was part of the ethnic cleansing of the Zamość region.

== Background ==
In the autumn of 1942, at the direction of SS-Brigadeführer Odilo Globocnik, SS and Police Leader in the Lublin district of the General Government, a significant Nazi displacement operation commenced in the Zamość region. Its aim was to remove around 100,000 Poles from this area and replace them with German settlers, primarily comprising ethnic Germans from various European countries. The initial displacements began on the night of November 27-28, 1942, extending to 60 villages housing approximately 34,000 individuals by the end of December. The second phase of the operation lasted from mid-January to the end of March 1943 and covered mainly the areas of the Hrubieszów County. Inhabitants of 63 villages were then displaced.

The Nazi actions faced passive resistance from the displaced populace and armed responses from the Polish resistance movement. Partisan units from the Peasant Battalions (Bataliony Chłopskie), Home Army (Armia Krajowa), and communist People's Guard (Gwardia Ludowa) attempted to impede pacification and displacement efforts, targeting German police, economic sites, and transportation facilities. They also conducted retaliatory actions in villages settled by German colonists. The resistance put up by the Polish partisans, combined with the difficult situation of German troops on the Eastern Front, forced the occupiers to temporarily suspend the deportations.

At the end of June 1943, the Nazis resumed their displacement operation, focusing on villages in Biłgoraj County. The expulsion of the Polish population coincided with widespread pacification and anti-partisan activities. As part of the Aktion Werwolf (Operation Werewolf) that summer, the occupiers executed approximately 1,000 Poles across 163 villages in the Zamość region.

== The massacre ==
On July 2, 1943, the Nazis initiated the displacement of Majdan Stary's inhabitants. On that day, many residents were deported for forced labour or sent to the Majdanek concentration camp.

Around noon the following day, an SS-led punitive expedition, supported by Ukrainian or Russian-speaking collaborators, reached Majdan Stary. They conducted a thorough search of the village, setting fire to buildings simultaneously. The captured residents were herded to a nearby meadow, where men and women with children were separated. The men were tied with ropes around their necks, lined up, and machine-gunned. Subsequently, the perpetrators ordered the women and children to kneel before shooting them. Wounded individuals were finished off with pistol shots. Only four women survived the massacre. Witnesses' testimonies attribute the executions to Ukrainian or Russian-speaking collaborators.

Reports on the number of victims range from 56 to 83 individuals. However, the Register of Places and Facts of Crimes Committed by the Nazi Occupier on Polish Lands in the years 1939–1945 lists 75 murdered inhabitants of Majdan Stary, with 72 identified victims. Among them were 26 women and 16 children under 15 years old. The youngest victim was 2 months old, while the oldest was 81 years old. Additionally, 76 farms were destroyed, and the local church was demolished and desecrated.

== Aftermath ==
For two days, the Germans searched the village and its surroundings. Between June 26 and July 10, 1943, an estimated 2,589 individuals, primarily men, were expelled from all nine communities in the Gmina Sól.

Most likely, the massacre was a retaliation for the village's collaboration with the Polish partisans. The atrocity was documented in reports by the Polish Underground State. There were inaccurate reports claiming that the Germans burned 40 inhabitants alive and destroyed 75 percent of the village.

The bodies of the victims from the pacification were buried in the local cemetery.

== Bibliography ==
- Fajkowski, Józef (1972). Wieś w ogniu. Eksterminacja wsi polskiej w okresie okupacji hitlerowskiej [A countryside on fire. The extermination of the Polish villages during the Nazi occupation] (in Polish). Warszawa: Ludowa Spółdzielnia Wydawnicza.
- Fajkowski, Józef; Religa, Jan (1981). Zbrodnie hitlerowskie na wsi polskiej 1939–1945 [Nazi crimes in the Polish countryside 1939–1945] (in Polish). Warszawa: Książka i Wiedza.
- Jaczyńska, Agnieszka (2012). Sonderlaboratorium SS. Zamojszczyzna: "pierwszy obszar osiedleńczy" w Generalnym Gubernatorstwie [SS' special laboratory. Zamość region: a "first settlement territory" in the General Government] (in Polish). Lublin: Instytut Pamięci Narodowej – Komisja Ścigania Zbrodni przeciwko Narodowi Polskiemu. Oddział w Lublinie. ISBN 978-83-7629-383-7.
- Madajczyk, Czesław (1965). Hitlerowski terror na wsi polskiej 1939–1945. Zestawienie większych akcji represyjnych [Nazi terror in the Polish countryside 1939–1945. List of major repressive actions] (in Polish). Warszawa: Państwowe Wydawnictwo Naukowe.
- Madajczyk, Czesław, ed. (1979). Zamojszczyzna – Sonderlaboratorium SS. Zbiór dokumentów polskich i niemieckich z okresu okupacji hitlerowskiej [Zamość region - the SS' special laboratory. Collection of Polish and German documents from the period of Nazi occupation] (in Polish). Vol. I&II. Warszawa: Ludowa Spółdzielnia Wydawnicza.
- Mikoda, Janina, ed. (1994). Rejestr miejsc i faktów zbrodni popełnionych przez okupanta hitlerowskiego na ziemiach polskich w latach 1939–1945. Województwo zamojskie [Register of places and facts of crimes committed by the Nazi Occupier on Polish Lands in the years 1939–1945. Zamość Voivodeship] (in Polish). Warszawa: GKBZHwP-IPN. ISBN 83-903356-0-3.
