= Zagóra, Gmina Susiec =

Zagóra
- Settlement
- Location within Poland
- Coordinates: 50°24′59″N 23°11′22″E
- Country: Poland
- Voivodeship: Lublin
- County: Tomaszów
- Gmina: Susiec

Zagóra (Polish pronunciation: [zaˈɡura]) is a settlement in the administrative district of Gmina Susiec, within Tomaszów County, Lublin Voivodeship, in eastern Poland. It is situated in the forested Roztocze region, an area known for its mixed woodlands and small agricultural clearings. The settlement lies close to the boundary of the Roztocze Narional Park, which is noted for its natural trails and protected habitats.
