= Wywłoczka =

- Village
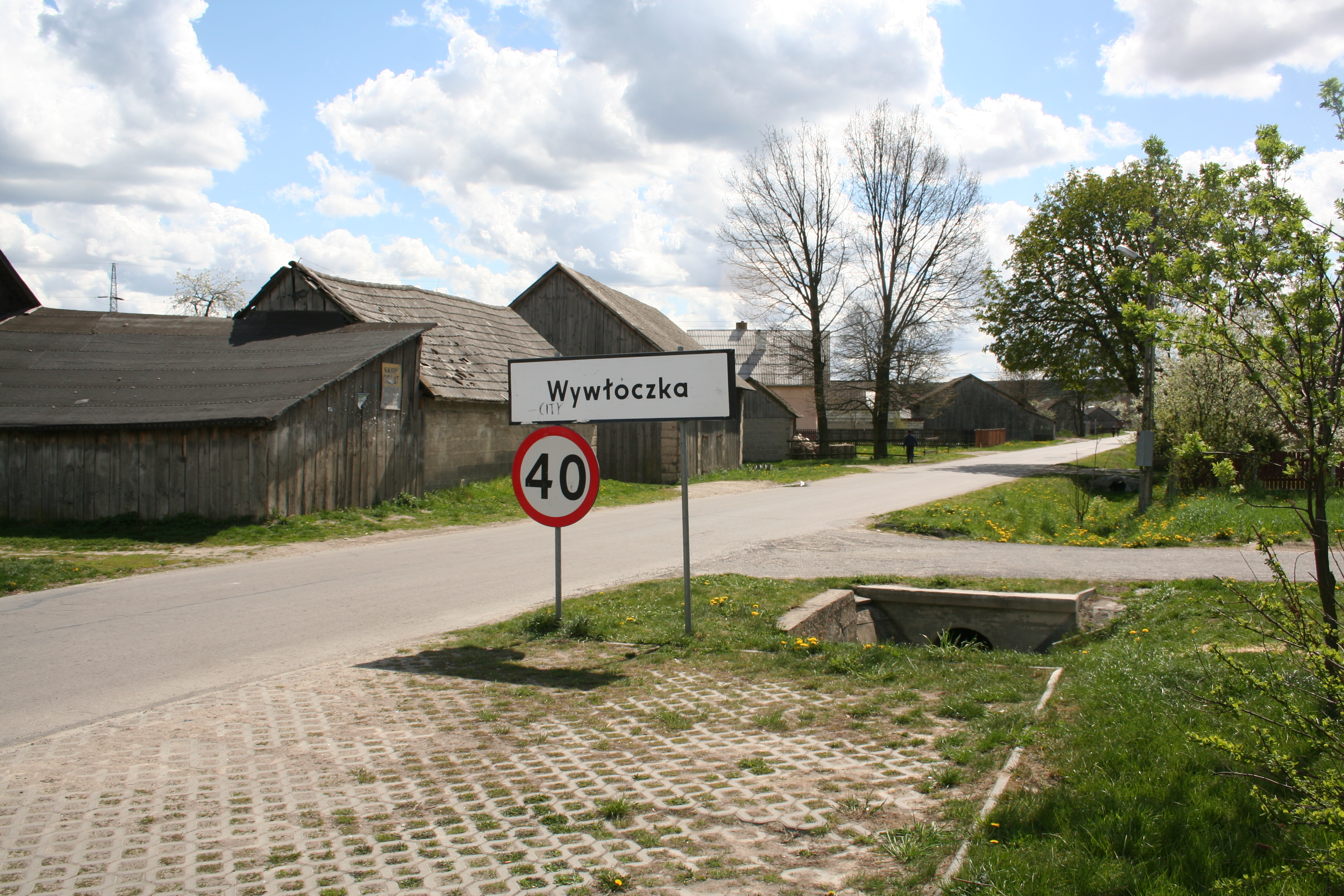

- Location within Poland
- Coordinates: 50°37′16″N 22°56′50″E
- Country: Poland
- Voivodeship: Lublin
- County: Zamość
- Gmina: Zwierzyniec
- Population (2011): 481

Wywłoczka is a village in the administrative district of Gmina Zwierzyniec, within Zamość County, Lublin Voivodeship, in eastern Poland.

The private noble village of Wywłoczka was located at the turn of the 16th and 17th centuries in the Chełm Land of the Ruthenian Voivodeship.

Wywłoczka is a sołectwo of Gmina Zwierzyniec.
