= Operation Zamość =

Nazi ethnic cleansing plan in Poland

Ethnic cleansing of Polish Zamojszczyzna
- Part of Generalplan Ost, Nazi crimes against the Polish nation, and Expulsion of Poles by Nazi Germany
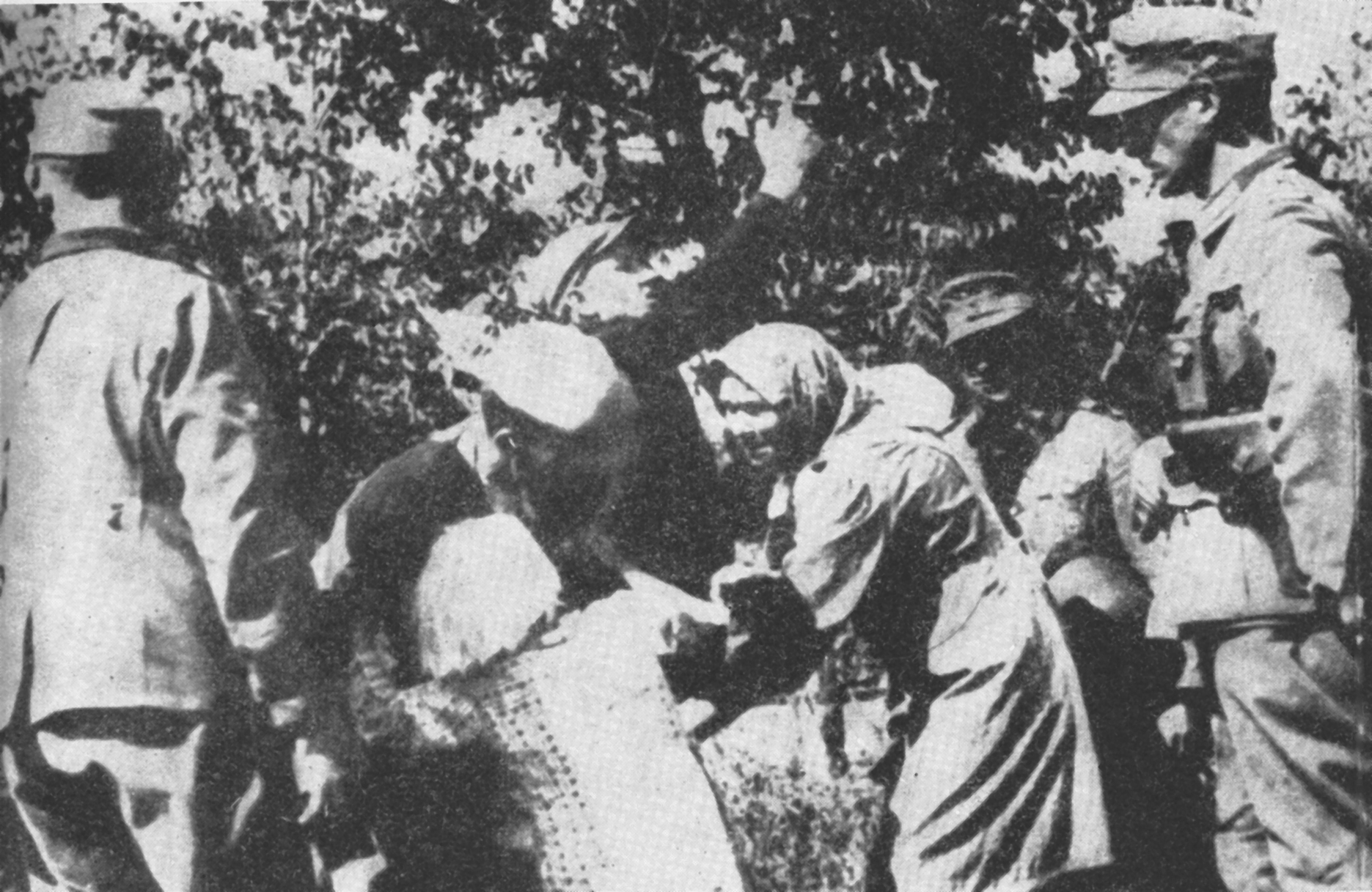
- Kidnapping of Polish children during the "resettlement" operation in Zamość county

Part of
- Generalplan Ost

Mass kidnappings and expulsions
- Period: November 1942 – March 1943
- Territory: General Government, Lublin District
- Victims: 116,000 Polish men and women including 30,000 children
- Destinations: Forced labour and concentration camps (Auschwitz, Majdanek)
- Motives: Nazi racist policy, Anti-slavism, Anti-polonism

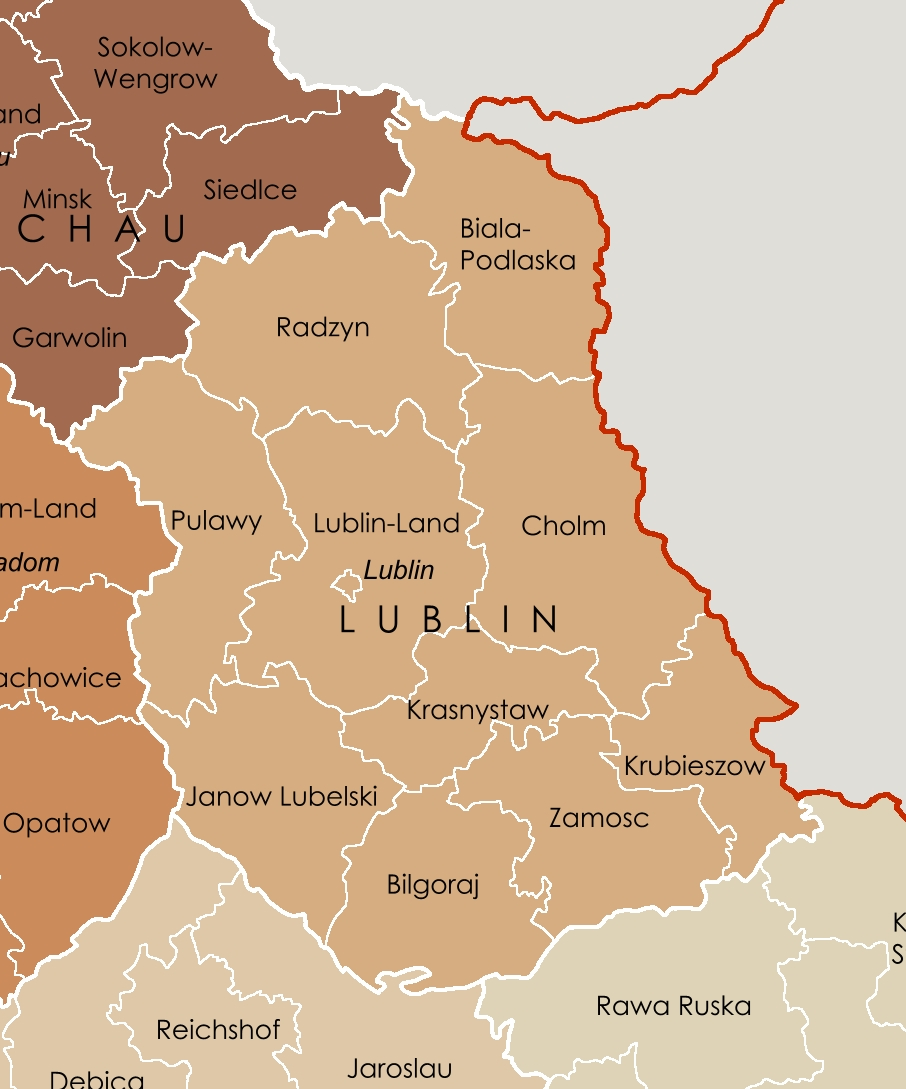
Zamość region as part of Lublin District (lower right)

The ethnic cleansing of Zamojszczyzna by Nazi Germany (German: Aktion Zamosc, also: Operation Himmlerstadt) during World War II was carried out as part of a greater plan of forcible removal of the entire Polish populations from targeted regions of occupied Poland in preparation for the state-sponsored settlement of the ethnic German Volksdeutsche. The operation of mass expulsions from Zamojszczyzna region around the city of Zamość (now in Lublin Voivodeship, Poland) was carried out between November 1942 and March 1943 on direct order from Heinrich Himmler. It was preplanned by both Globocnik from Action Reinhard and Himmler, as the first stage of the eventual murderous ethnic cleansing ahead of projected Germanization of the entire General Government territory.

In Polish historiography, the events surrounding the Nazi German roundups are often named alternatively as the Children of Zamojszczyzna to emphasize the simultaneous apprehension of around 30,000 children at that time, snatched away from their parents transported from Zamojszczyzna to concentration camps and slave labour in Nazi Germany. According to historical sources the German police and military expelled 116,000 Polish men and women in just a few months during Action Zamość.

== Genesis ==
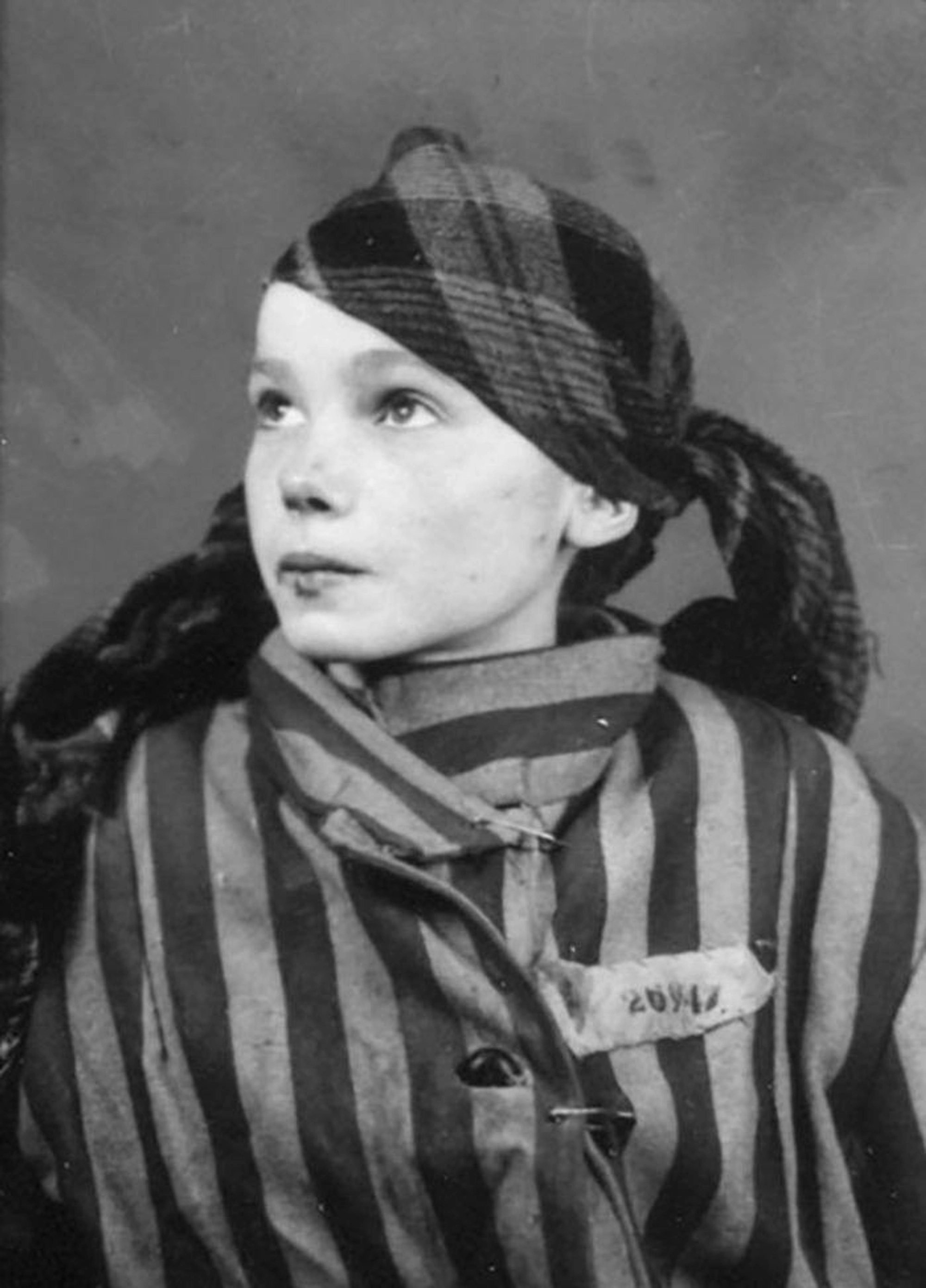
Czesława Kwoka – one of many Polish children from the region murdered in Auschwitz

Wartime fate of the Polish children from Zamojszczyzna was closely related to the German plans for the expansion of their own so-called "living space in the East", part of a broader Nazi policy called the Generalplan Ost. The plans for "ethnically cleansing the land" of its inhabitants were created in the fall of 1941 in Berlin and were closely connected with the idea of the new great consolidation of German nationhood. Country-wide actions dubbed Heim ins Reich ("Home to the Reich") were conducted across all of Central and Eastern Europe (see Action Saybusch in Polish Silesia). Their main purpose was to transplant colonists of the German origin from Russia, Romania, and other countries, to occupied Poland. At the beginning of war, the programme was mainly realised in western parts of Poland, including Wielkopolska, Eastern Silesia and Danzig-Westpreußen already controlled by Nazi Germany; but after Operation Barbarossa, it was continued throughout the General Government.

In order to prepare the land for the new German settlers, both German military and all branches of police including Sonderdienst, aided by the Ukrainian Auxiliary Police battalions, conducted mass deportations of native Polish inhabitants using Holocaust trains as well as lorries and even horse-drawn wagons. Zamojszczyzna was recognized as one of the core German settlement areas in Distrikt Galizien, and according to the order of Reichsführer-SS Heinrich Himmler became the first intervention target in the region. Ukrainians were transferred to villages on the perimeter of German colonies to provide a buffer zone protecting the German settlers from Polish partisans.

== The forcible depopulation of Zamość region ==
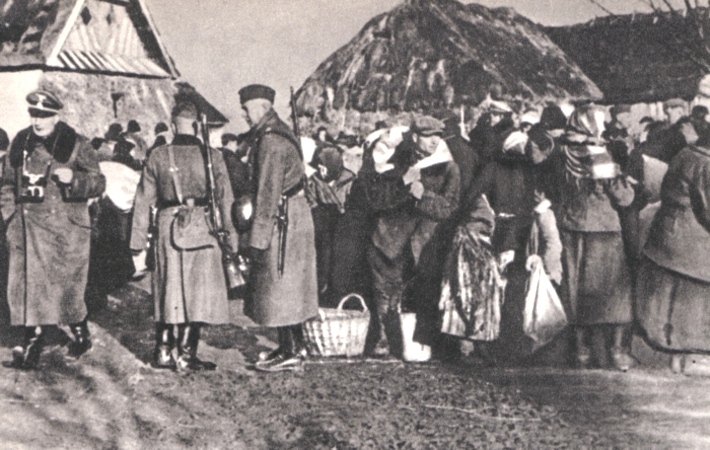
Expulsions of Poles from the Zamość region in December 1942

Nazi Germany attacked the Soviet Union on June 22, 1941, and, in the euphoric atmosphere surrounding its initial victories, the Aktion Zamosc was first outlined by Himmler together with Governor Hans Frank who initially requested that the programme be delayed until complete victory, but was convinced otherwise. In accordance with the General Plan East, the first forcible removal of the 2,000 inhabitants from selected villages was conducted between 6 and 25 November 1941, while the general deportation programme began a year later on the night of 27–28 November 1942 in Skierbieszów and its vicinity. By then, the murderous Operation Reinhard was already in full swing.

The expulsions encompassed the districts of Hrubieszów, Tomaszów Lubelski, Zamość and Biłgoraj, and were completed in March 1943. In total, 297 Polish villages were depopulated. A concentration camp was created in Zamość around the streets of Piłsudskiego and Okrzei. Initially, it was a transit camp for Soviet POWs, rebuilt and expanded with 15 new barracks added for the imprisonment of rounded up families. SS-Unterscharführer Artur Schütz was appointed the camp's commandant. From there, transports of children no older than 14 years of age – whose names have already been Germanized – were sent elsewhere. Historians estimate that 116,000 people in total were forcibly removed from Zamojszczyzna, among them 30,000 children.

== Deportations to concentration camps ==
The camp in Zamość (pl), located on S. Okrzei street, served as the transit point for selections and further deportations. In the first month of Action Zamość, the camp processed 7,055 Polish inhabitants of 62 villages. People were divided into four main categories with the following code letters: "WE" (re-Germanization), "AA" (transport to the Reich), "RD" (farm-work for the settlers), "KI" (Kindertransport), "AG" (work in the General Government); and finally, "KL" (concentration camp). Those expelled from Zamojszczyzna to perform slave labour in Germany were loaded onto trains departing for temporary displacement camps governed by main resettlement HQ in Łodź. People from the last group were sent to the Nazi concentration camps at Auschwitz and Majdanek.

The camp in Zamość processed 31,536 Poles according to Germany's own records, or 41,000 based on postwar estimates. Dispossessed Polish families were sent to other transit camps as well, including Zwierzyniec in the Zamość County, which processed 20,000-24,000 Poles (12,000 between July and August 1943). Transit camps existed in Budzyń, Frampol, Lublin (on Krochmalna street), Stary Majdan, Biłgoraj County, Tarnogród, Wola Derezieńska, Old Wedan, Biłgoraj and Puszcza Solska. Race selections based on forcible abduction of children from their parents were conducted in all of them. The term "Children of Zamojszczyzna" originates from the multitude of those locations.

I have seen with my own eyes how the Germans took children away from their mothers. The act of their forcible separation shook me terribly... The Germans beat them with whips until the blood flew in case of slightest opposition, mothers and children alike. One could hear moaning and crying throughout the entire camp on those occasions... I have also seen small children being killed by the Germans. – Leonard Szpuga, farmer expelled from Topólcza

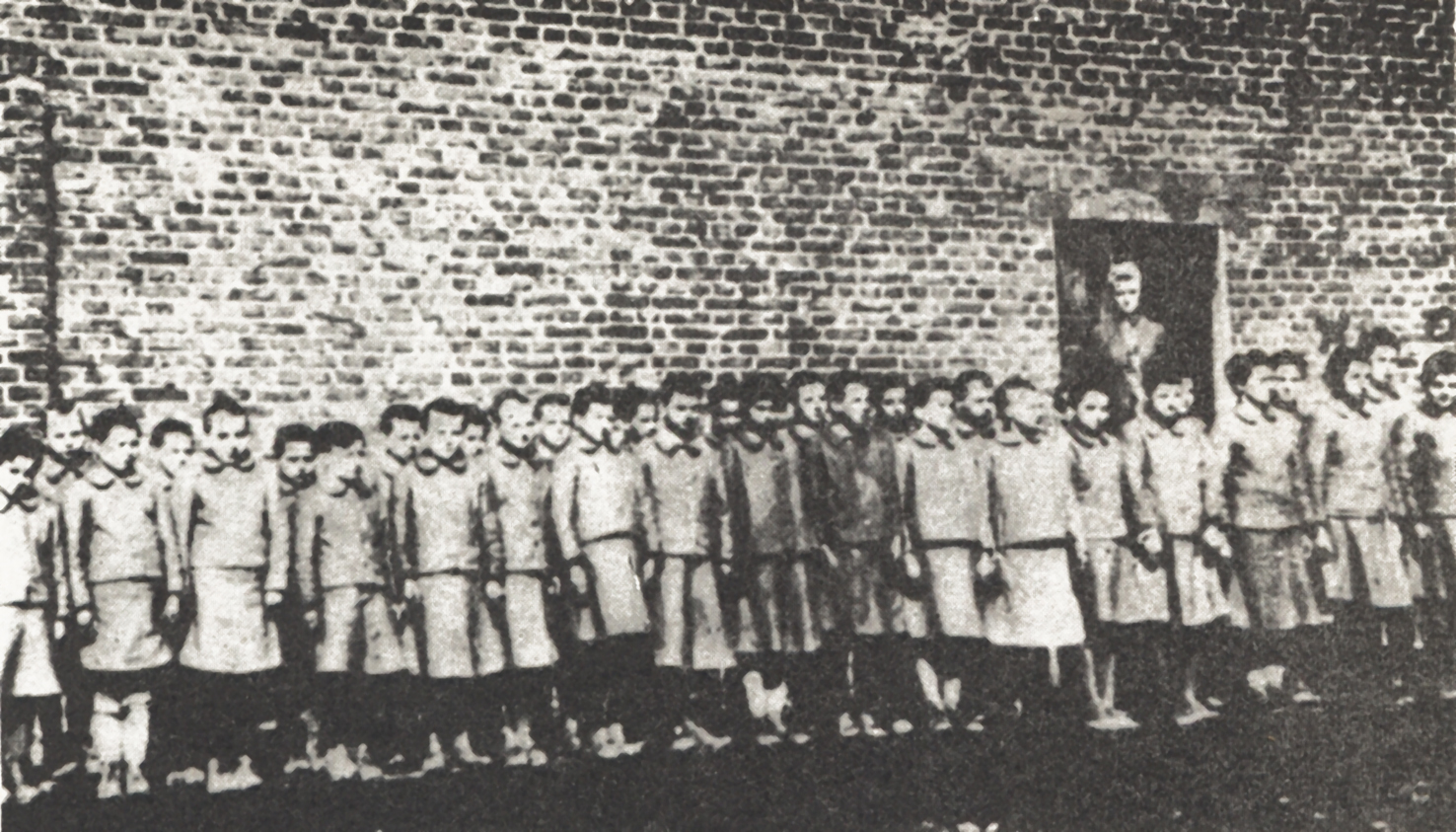
Polish girls at a Nazi-German camp in Dzierżązna near Zgierz. Among the prisoners were children resettled from Zamojszczyzna (1942-1943).

Children suffered the most in these camps. The average stay lasted several months. Starvation, cold, and disease were fatal for them a lot more often than for adults. Separated from their parents, children were transported in cattle wagons (100 up to 150 children in one wagon) to other destinations. Many of them were sent to a Kinder KZ (concentration camp for children) run side by side with the Łódź Ghetto. Kinder KZ processed up to 13,000 children. The dramatic news of the children from Zamojszczyzna quickly spread through the entire country. Polish railwaymen were forwarding messages about transports to inhabitants of the cities where transports were stopping. There were several stations where residents risked rescuing the children, such as Sobolew, Żelechów, Siedlce, Garwolin, Pilawa and Warsaw. Another deportation action, called Operation Werwolf, was conducted during the summer of 1944 ahead of the Soviet advance. Many of the inhabitants were forced to evacuate after being previously transferred into these areas by Germany as early as 1939. Entire families ended up in concentration camps at Majdanek (up to 15,000 prisoners of Action Zamość) and Auschwitz, before deportation to forced labour in the Reich. At Majdanek, due to severe overcrowding, entire train-loads were kept in open fields numbered from III to V.

== See also ==
- Zamość Uprising
- Kidnapping of children by Nazi Germany
- Nazi crimes against the Polish nation
- The Holocaust in Poland
- Racial policy of Nazi Germany
- World War II casualties of Poland
- Special Prosecution Book-Poland
- Expulsion of Poles by Nazi Germany
