= Żurawnica =

- Village
- Location within Poland
- Coordinates: 50°39′05″N 22°57′41″E
- Country: Poland
- Voivodeship: Lublin
- County: Zamość
- Gmina: Zwierzyniec
- Population (2011): 786

Żurawnica is a village in the administrative district of Gmina Zwierzyniec, within Zamość County, Lublin Voivodeship, in eastern Poland. It is a sołectwo of Gmina Zwierzyniec.

== History ==
The village was recorded in 1563 as Żorawnica, similarly in 1564, and Żurawnica in 1827. Żurawnica was a village under Vlach law at the beginning of the 16th century. The private noble village of Żurawnica was located at the turn of the 16th and 17th centuries in the Chełm Land of the Ruthenian Voivodeship.

According to the Geographical Dictionary of the Kingdom of Poland in 1895, Żurawnica was a village in the Zamość district, Zwierzyniec commune, Szczebrzeszyn parish. Quoting from the note of the SgKP, "The village population is distinguished by character attributes". In the 1827 census, 64 houses and 321 inhabitants of the parish in Topolcza were listed in the village.

== Bibliography ==
- Czopek, Barbara. Nazwy miejscowe dawnej Ziemi Chełmskiej i Bełskiej (W granicach dzisiejszego państwa polskiego). Wrocław.
