= Susiec =

- Village
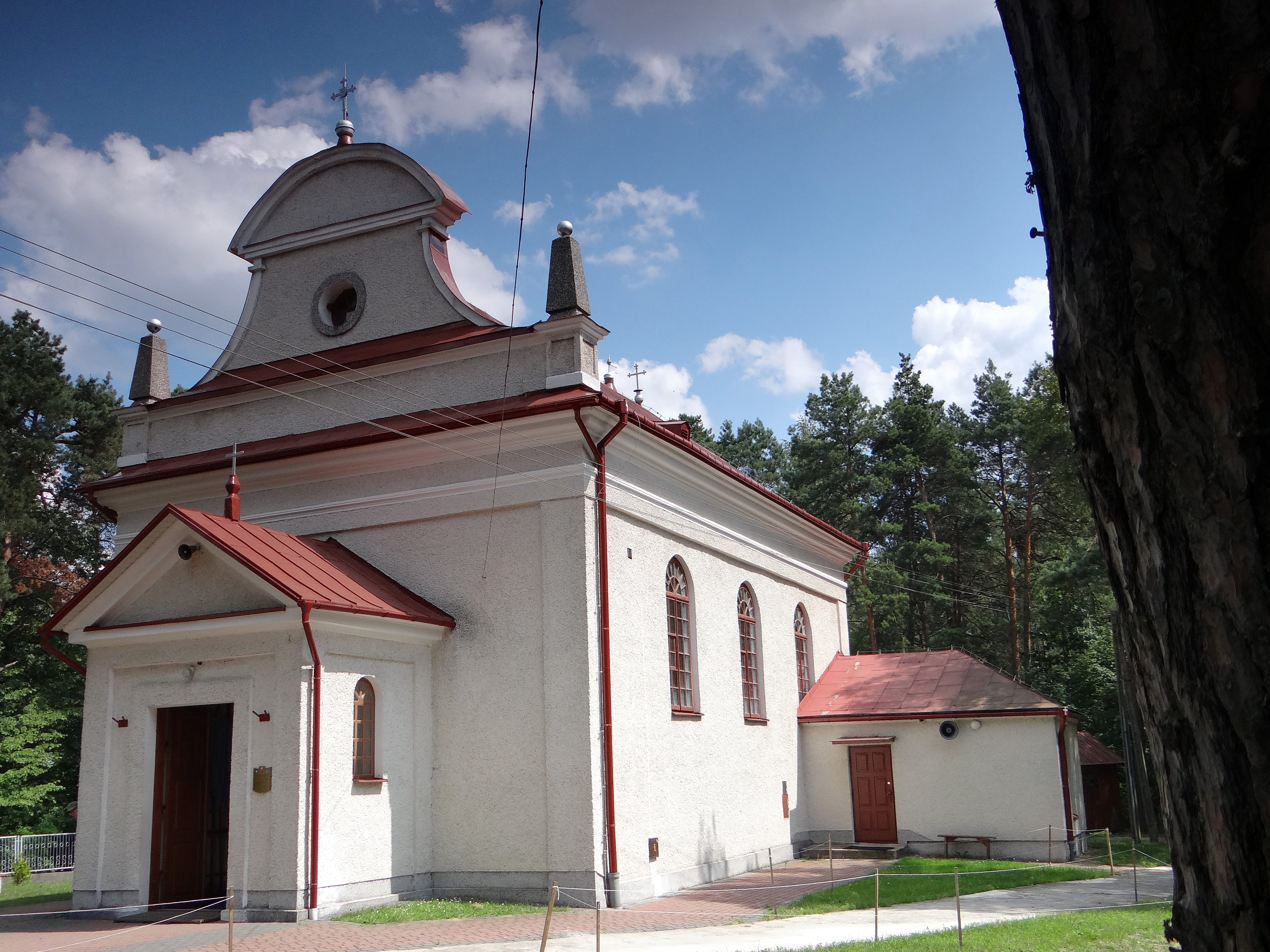
- Church of Saint John of Nepomuk

- Location within Poland
- Coordinates: 50°26′N 23°10′E
- Country: Poland
- Voivodeship: Lublin
- County: Tomaszów
- Gmina: Susiec
- Website: https://www.susiec.pl

Susiec [ˈsuɕɛt͡s] is a village and holiday resort in Tomaszów County, Lublin Voivodeship, in southeastern Poland. It is the seat of the gmina (administrative district) called Gmina Susiec.

Polish film director Sylwester Chęciński was born here.

== See also ==
- Roztocze
- Roztocze National Park
