= Sikliwce =

- Settlement
- Location within Poland
- Coordinates: 50°24′32″N 23°14′34″E
- Country: Poland
- Voivodeship: Lublin
- County: Tomaszów
- Gmina: Susiec

Sikliwce [ɕiˈklift͡sɛ] is a settlement in the administrative district of Gmina Susiec, within Tomaszów County, Lublin Voivodeship, in eastern Poland.
