= Paary =

- Village
- Location within Poland
- Coordinates: 50°22′N 23°17′E
- Country: Poland
- Voivodeship: Lublin
- County: Tomaszów
- Gmina: Susiec

Population
  - Total: 680
- Time zone: UTC+1 (CET)
  - Summer (DST): UTC+2 (CEST)

Paary [paˈarɨ] is a village in the administrative district of Gmina Susiec, within Tomaszów County, Lublin Voivodeship, in eastern Poland.

== History ==
Nine Polish citizens were murdered by Nazi Germany in the village during World War II.
