= Zwierzyniec =

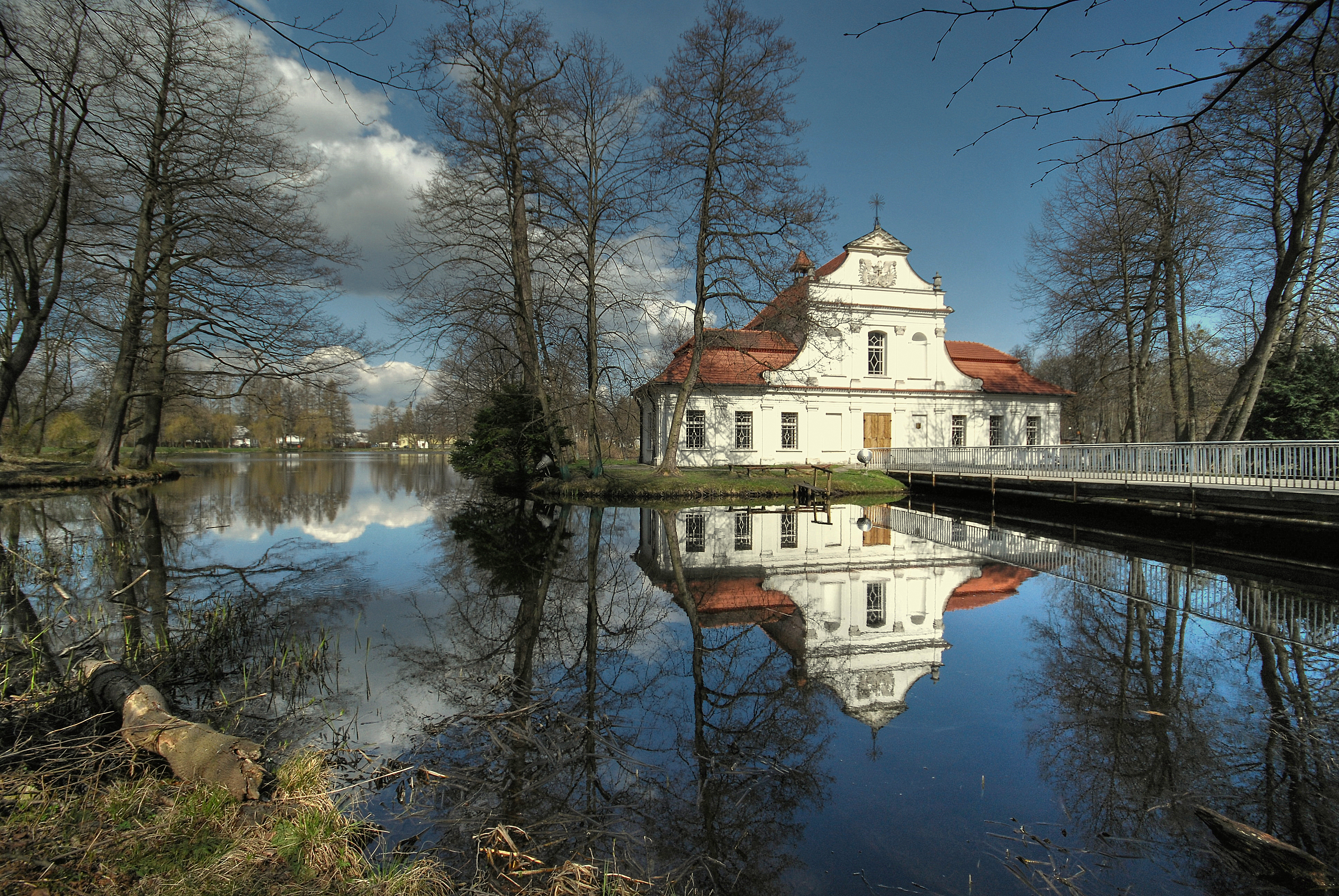
- Church of Saint John of Nepomuk on an island

- Coat of arms

- Location within Poland
- Coordinates: 50°37′N 22°58′E
- Country: Poland
- Voivodeship: Lublin
- County: Zamość
- Gmina: Zwierzyniec

Government
  - Mayor: Edyta Wolanin

Area
  - Total: 4.82 km^{2} (1.86 sq mi)
- Elevation: 215 m (705 ft)

Population (2006)
  - Total: 3,344
  - Density: 694/km^{2} (1,800/sq mi)
- Time zone: UTC+1 (CET)
  - Summer (DST): UTC+2 (CEST)
- Postal code: 22-470
- Car plates: LZA
- Website: www.zwierzyniec.info.pl

Zwierzyniec (Polish: [zvjɛˈʐɨɲɛt͡s]) is a town on the Wieprz river in the Zamość County, Lublin Voivodeship, Poland. It has 3,324 inhabitants (2004).

Zwierzyniec is the northernmost town of the Roztocze National Park. The park comprises some of the last remaining sections of the primordial forest of Central Europe, especially spectacular stand of ancient beech trees (Bukowa Gora). It also is a rail junction, located along the Rejowiec Fabryczny - Hrebenne - Munina connection, with a branch line going westwards, to Stalowa Wola, via Biłgoraj.

== History ==
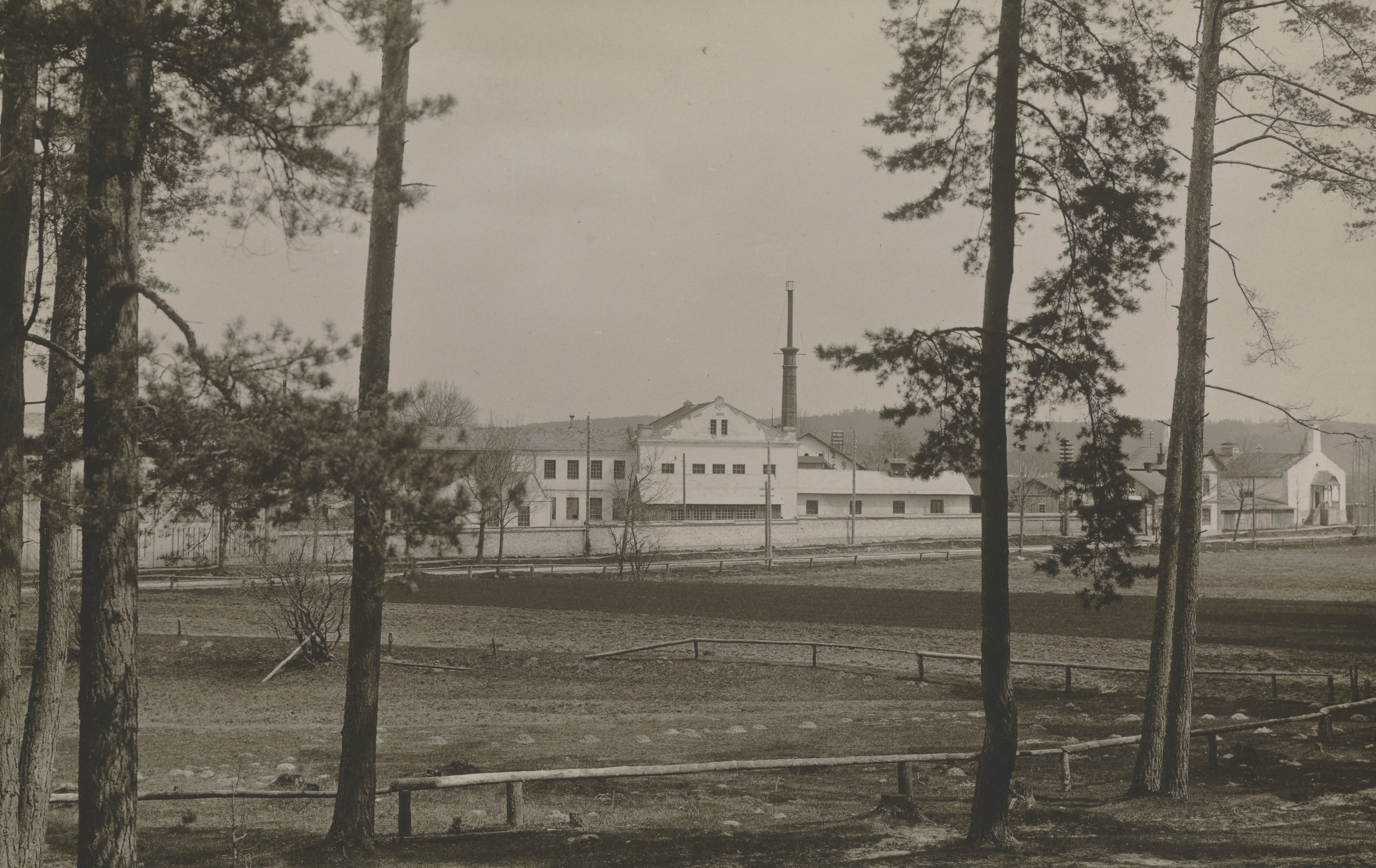
Brewery in the early 20th century

The Zwierzyniec settlement was established in the 16th century by the Zamoyski family. One of the features here is an artificial lake with a number of small islands - one of them contains monuments of the hounds belonging to the Polish Queen Marysieńka Sobieska (primo voto Zamoyska).

On another island, the Zamoyskis built a baroque chapel, which became later the main church of the local Catholic parish. It is now known as the St John Nepomucene's parish church - renovated and expanded in the early 1960s by father Dutkowski. The access to the chapel island is now via a bridge.

=== World War II ===
During the occupation of Poland in World War Two, Nazi Germans set up a transit camp in Zwierzyniec for the province-wide Action Zamość. The camp processed 20,000-24,000 Poles, with many victims sent to death camps at Auschwitz and Majdanek.

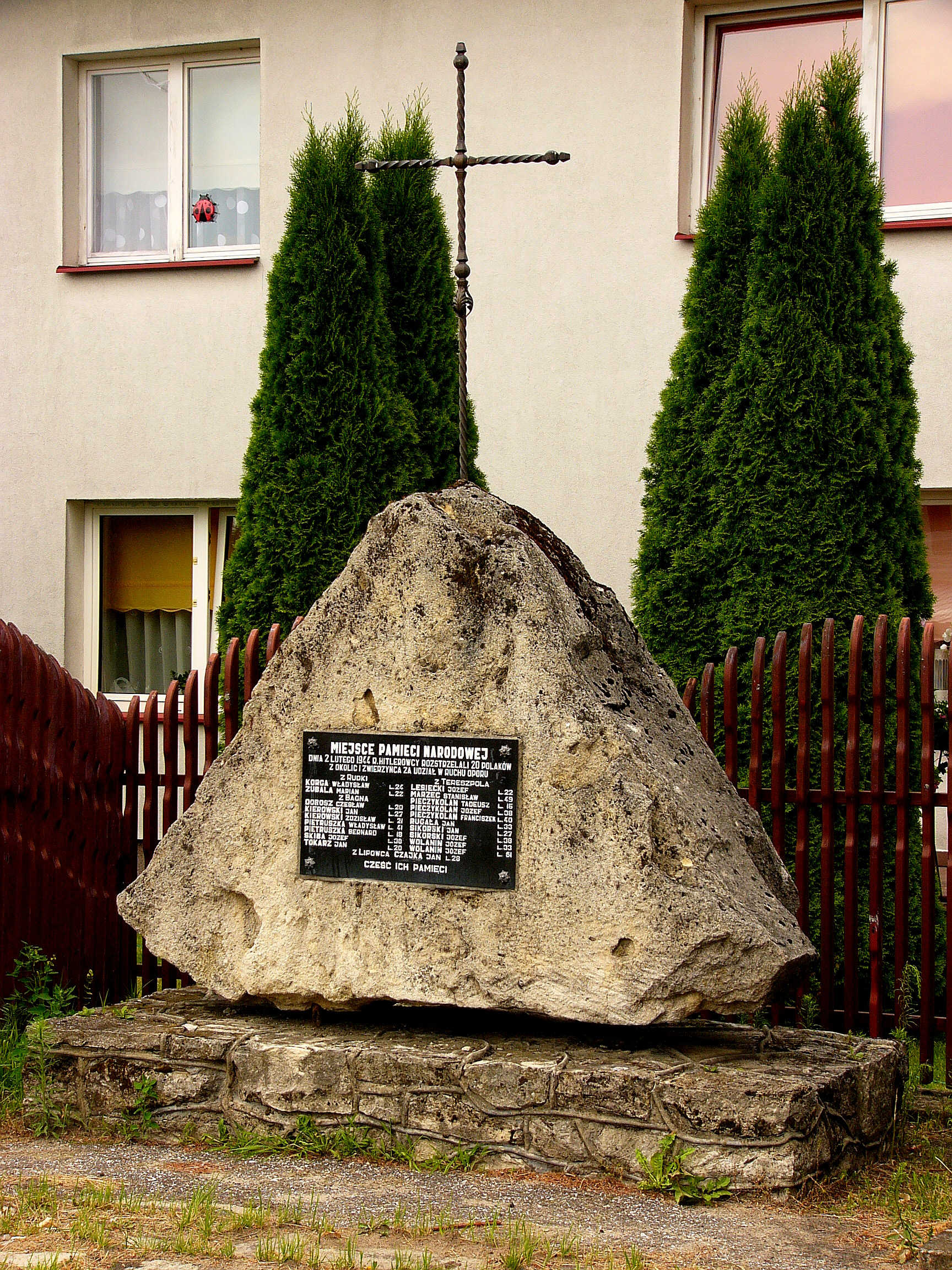
Memorial at the site of the massacre from February 1944

Race selections based on forcible abduction of children were conducted at Zwierzyniec. The term "Children of Zamojszczyzna" originates from this programme.

The town also had a Jewish population of between 1,000 and 1,500 Jews. The first transport of Jews during the Holocaust, numbering approximately 52 Jews from Zwierzyniec, Rudka and other surrounding villages, was sent to the Bełżec extermination camp in September 1942. A mass extermination of the Jewish population from Zwierzyniec started on October 21, 1942. Some of the Jews were shot dead on the spot; the remaining residents were sent to the railway station at Szczebrzeszyn, from where, together with the Szczebrzeszyn Jews, were sent to the Bełżec extermination camp.

On 2 February 1944, the Germans carried out a public execution of 20 Poles in Zwierzyniec, in retaliation for the death of a 19-year-old Volksdeutsch who denounced several local young people to the occupiers. The youngest victim of the massacre was 15 years old.

== Gallery ==
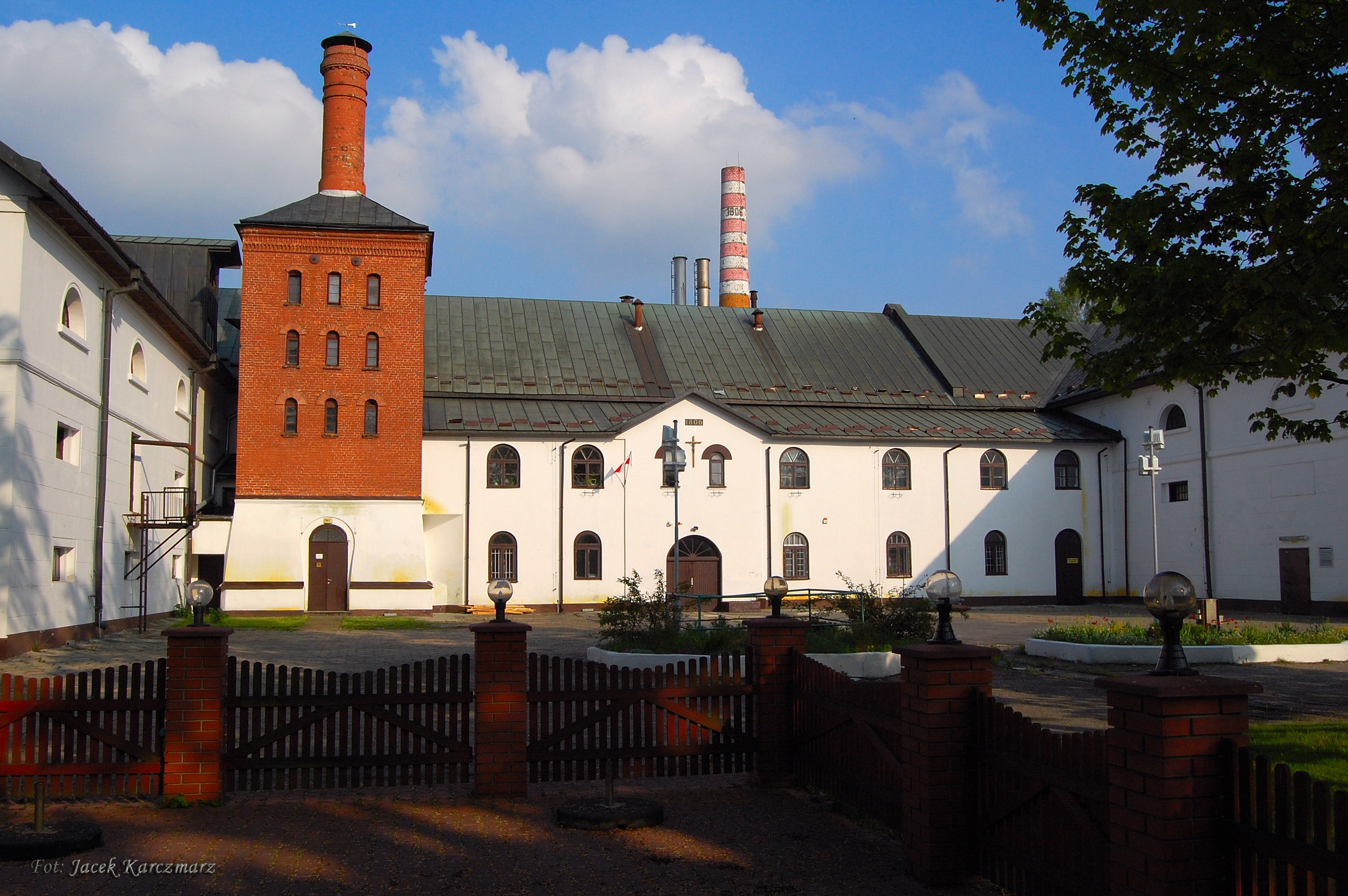
The Zwierzyniec Brewery building in Zwierzyniec

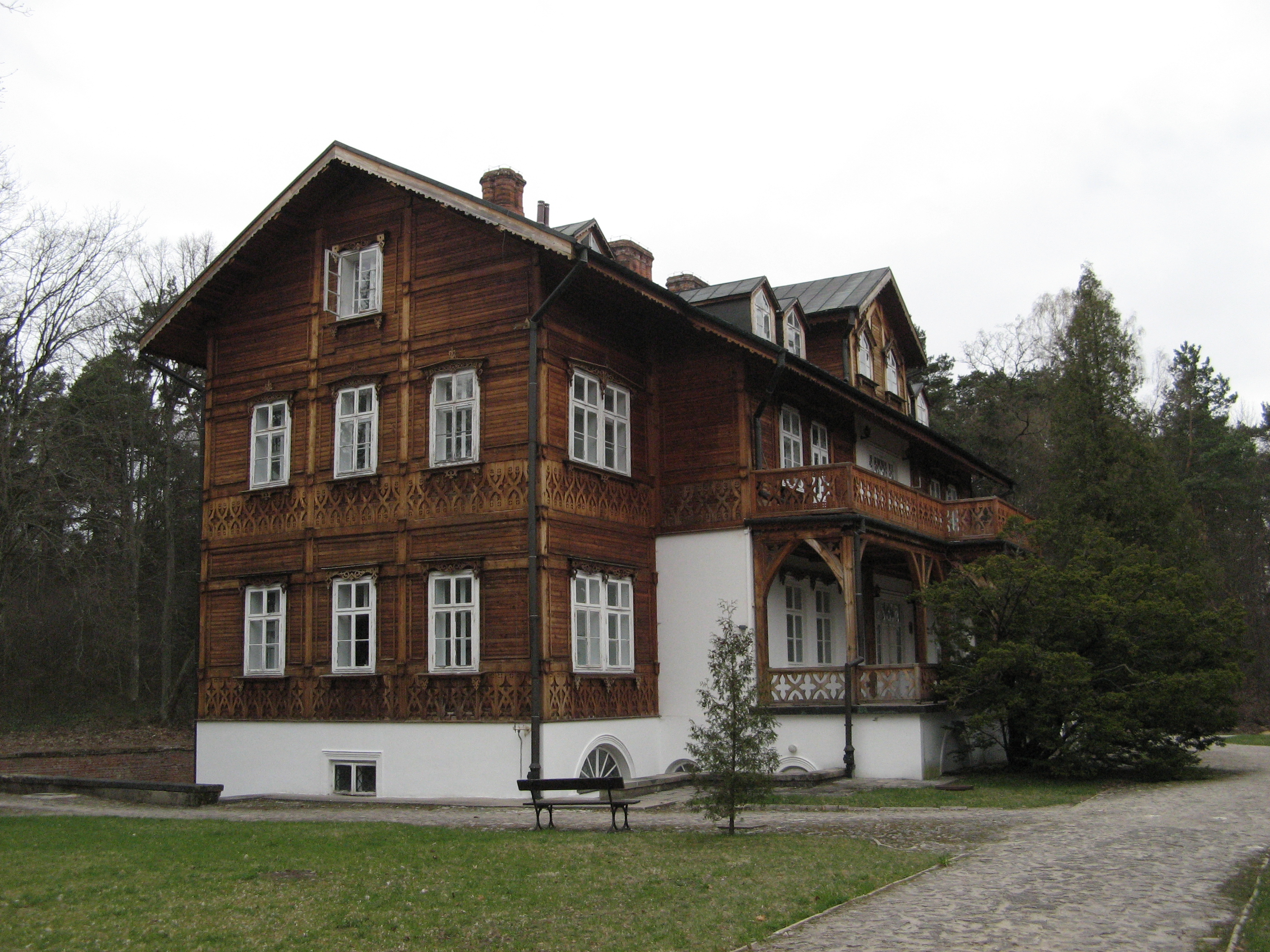
The House of the Plenipotentiary (now the head office of Roztocze National Park Management)

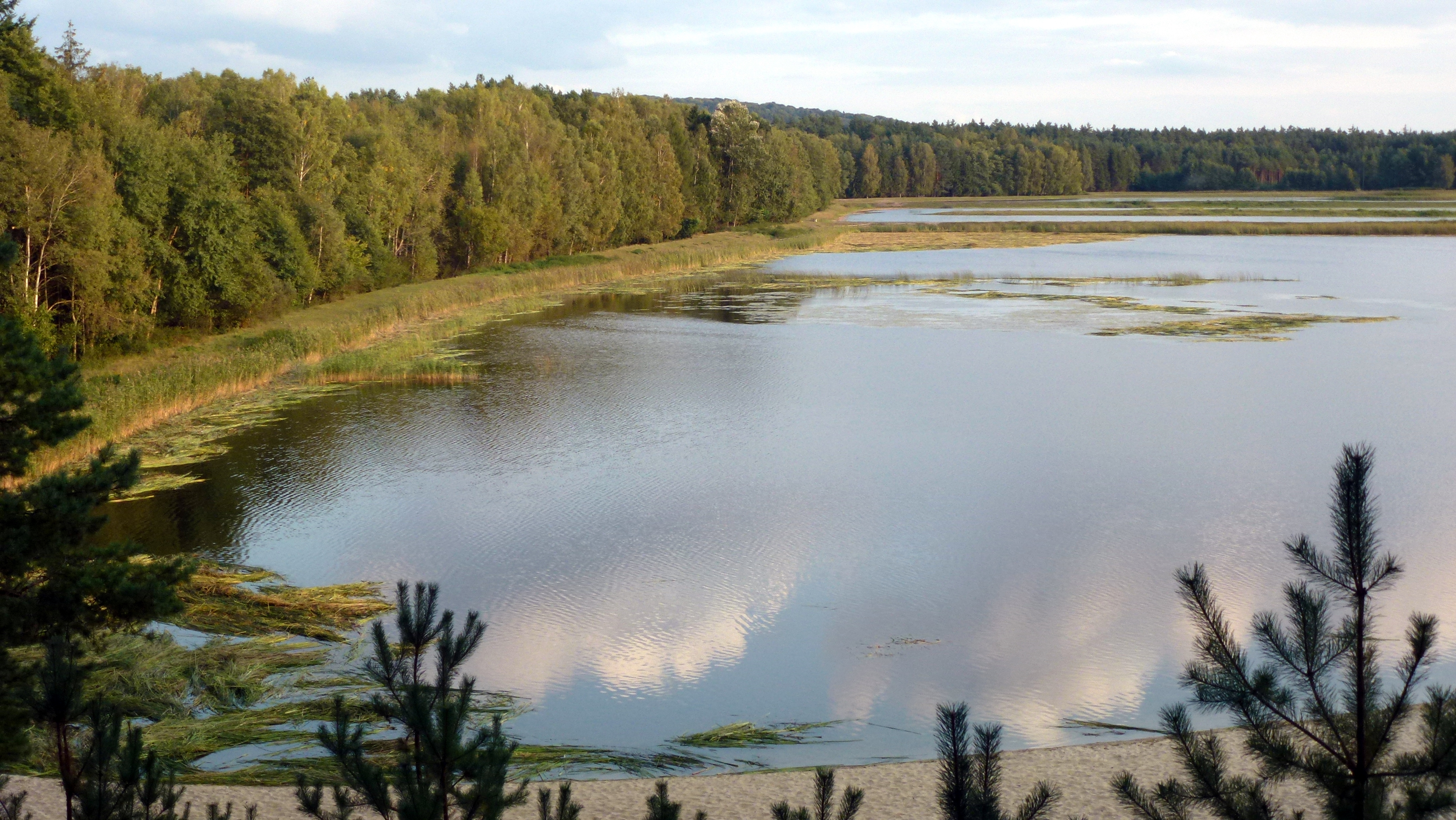
Echo lake

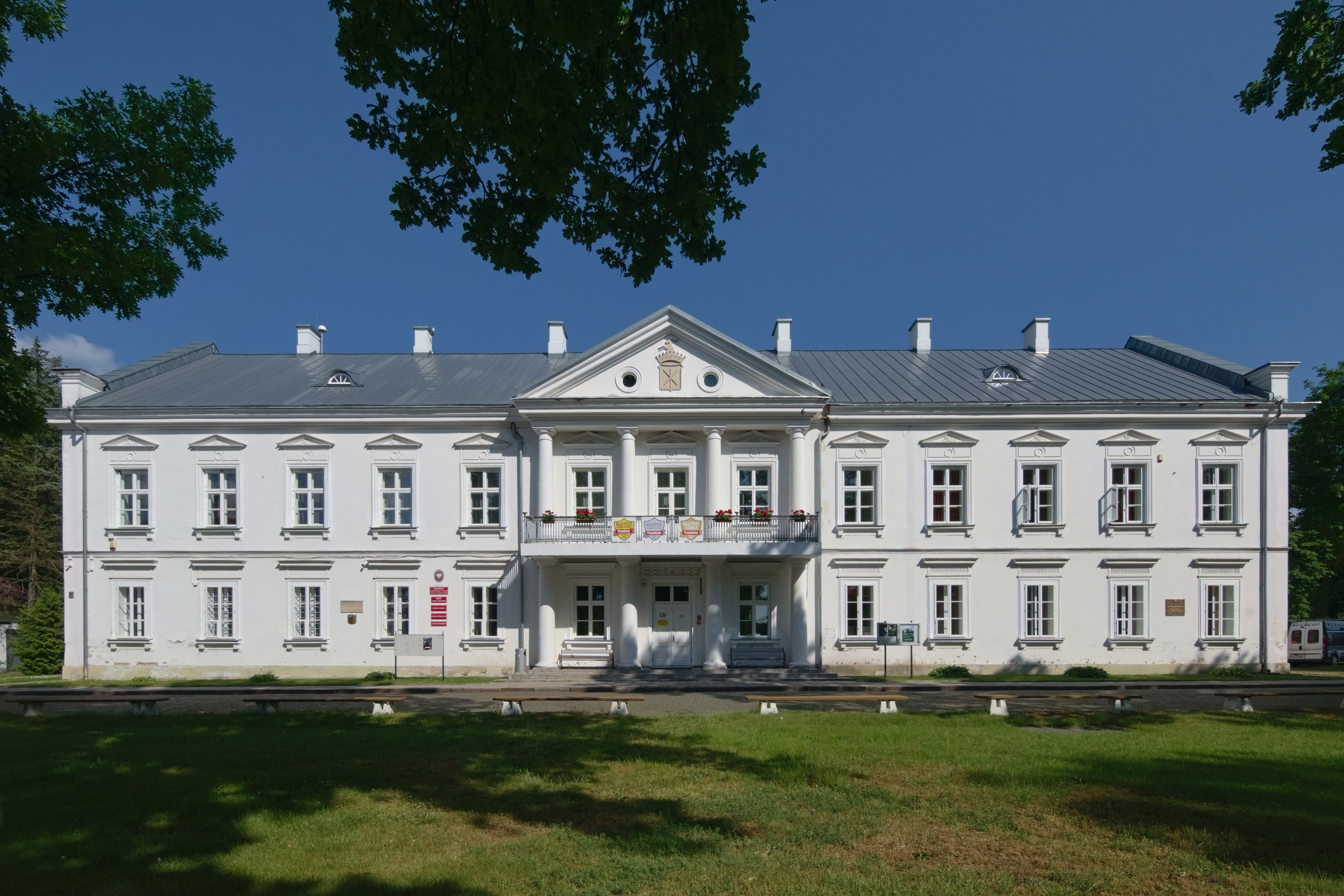
Zamoyski Ordinance, location of Nazi German resettlement office for mass deportations

== See also ==
- Zwierzyniec Brewery
- Roztocze
