= Zawadki, Gmina Susiec =

Zawadki
- Village
- Location within Poland
- Coordinates: 50°27′N 23°18′E
- Country: Poland
- Voivodeship: Lublin
- County: Tomaszów
- Gmina: Susiec

Zawadki [zaˈvatki] is a village in the administrative district of Gmina Susiec, within Tomaszów County, Lublin Voivodeship, in eastern Poland.
