= Rybnica-Niwka =

- Settlement
- Location within Poland
- Coordinates: 50°24′15″N 23°13′22″E
- Country: Poland
- Voivodeship: Lublin
- County: Tomaszów
- Gmina: Susiec

Rybnica-Niwka [rɨbˈnit͡sa ˈnifka] is a settlement in the administrative district of Gmina Susiec, within Tomaszów County, Lublin Voivodeship, in eastern Poland.
