= Dmitroce =

- Settlement
- Location within Poland
- Coordinates: 50°25′20″N 23°17′18″E
- Country: Poland
- Voivodeship: Lublin
- County: Tomaszów
- Gmina: Susiec

Dmitroce [dmiˈtrɔt͡sɛ] is a settlement in the administrative district of Gmina Susiec, within Tomaszów County, Lublin Voivodeship, in eastern Poland.
