= Świdy, Lublin Voivodeship =

Świdy
- Settlement
- Location within Poland
- Coordinates: 50°25′21″N 23°16′49″E
- Country: Poland
- Voivodeship: Lublin
- County: Tomaszów
- Gmina: Susiec

Świdy [ˈɕfidɨ] is a settlement in the administrative district of Gmina Susiec, within Tomaszów County, Lublin Voivodeship, in eastern Poland.
