= Rybnica, Lublin Voivodeship =

Rybnica
- Village
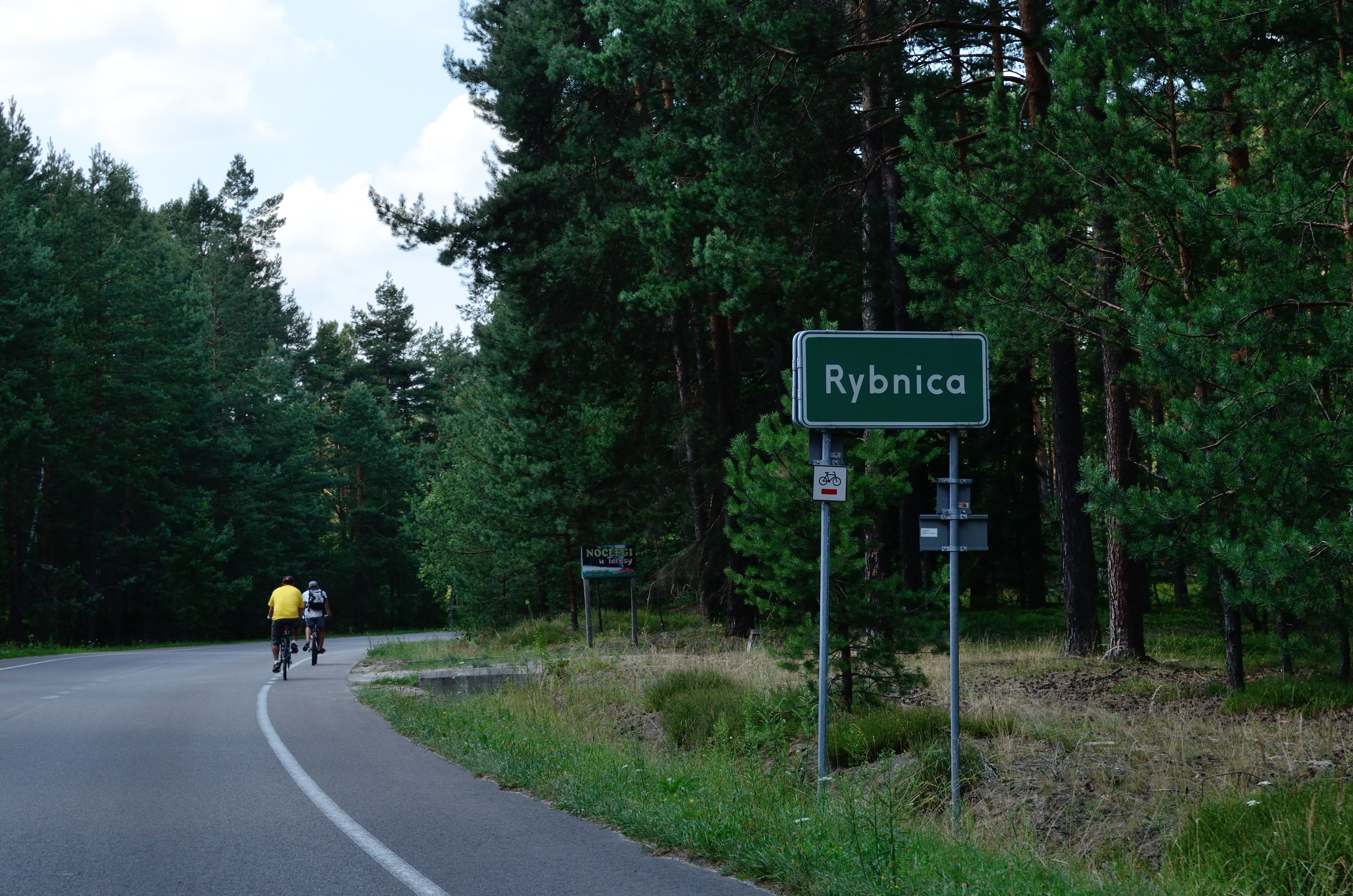

- Location within Poland
- Coordinates: 50°25′N 23°14′E
- Country: Poland
- Voivodeship: Lublin
- County: Tomaszów
- Gmina: Susiec
- Time zone: UTC+1 (CET)
  - Summer (DST): UTC+2 (CEST)
- Vehicle registration: LTM

Rybnica [rɨbˈnit͡sa] is a village in the administrative district of Gmina Susiec, within Tomaszów County, Lublin Voivodeship, in eastern Poland.
