= Łuszczacz =

- Village
- Location within Poland
- Coordinates: 50°29′N 23°15′E
- Country: Poland
- Voivodeship: Lublin
- County: Tomaszów
- Gmina: Susiec
- Time zone: UTC+1 (CET)
  - Summer (DST): UTC+2 (CEST)

Łuszczacz [ˈwuʂt͡ʂat͡ʂ] is a village in the administrative district of Gmina Susiec, within Tomaszów County, Lublin Voivodeship, in eastern Poland.

== History ==
Eight Polish citizens were murdered by Nazi Germany in the village during World War II.
