= Browary Lubelskie =

Polish brewery

Coordinates: 51.2436°N 22.5676°E

Perła – Browary Lubelskie S.A.
- Type: Brewery
- Location: Lublin, Poland
- Opened: 1846
- Owned by: Marconia Enterprises, Royal Unibrew

Perła

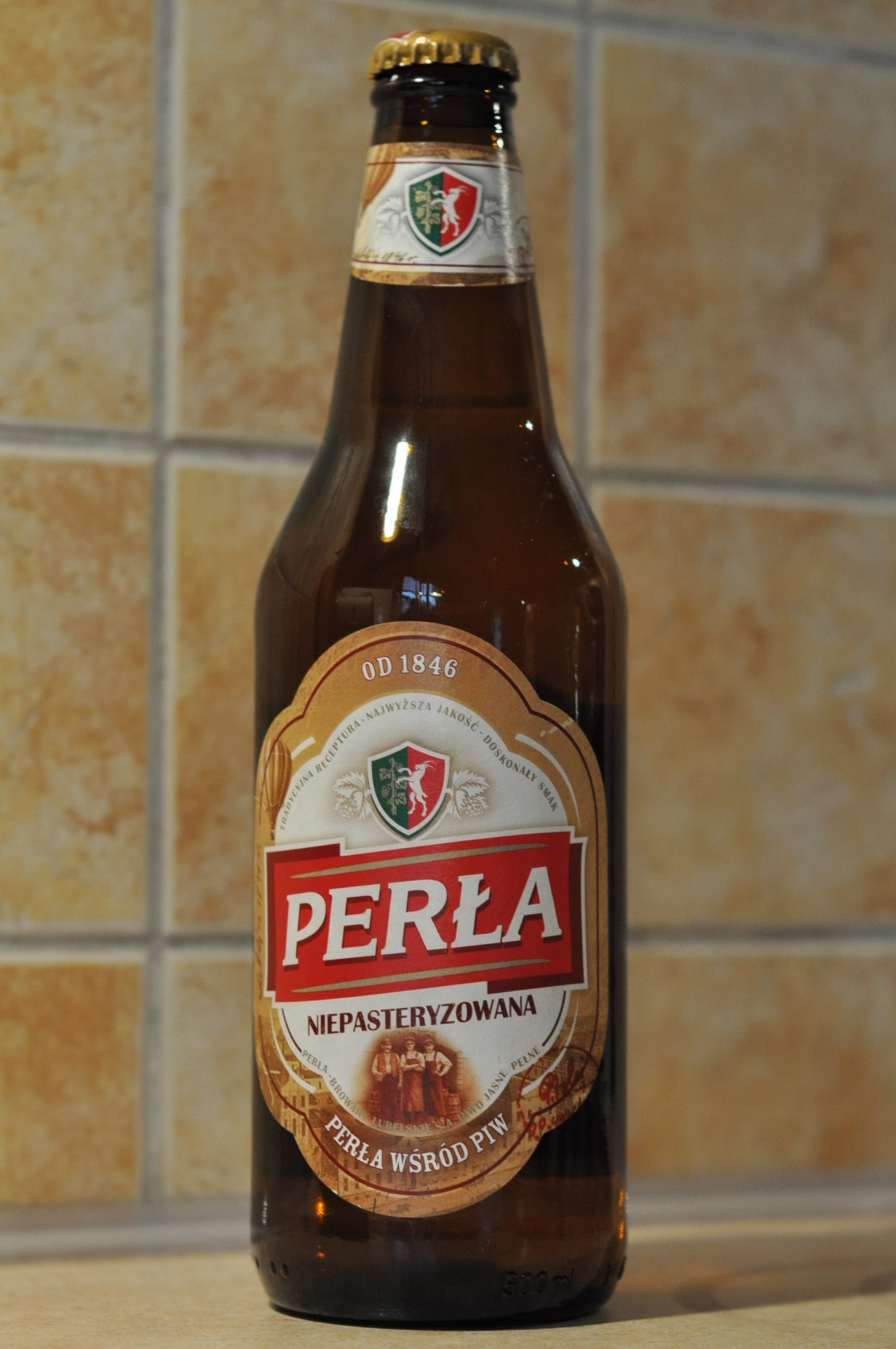
- Type: Beer
- Distributor: Perła – Browary Lubelskie
- Country of origin: Lublin, Poland
- Introduced: 1846
- Alcohol by volume: 6.0 %
- Style: pilsner
- Variants: Chmielowa, Czarna Extra Strong, Export, Miodowa, Mocna, Niepasteryzowana, Summer, Porter, Radler, Bezalkoholowa
- Website: www.perla.pl

Perła – Browary Lubelskie S.A. is a Polish brewery. Founded in 1844 in the abandoned ruins of a monastery, in 1846 it began brewing a Helles-style beer using bottom fermenting technology. A second brewery opened in 1914.

Both breweries were nationalized by the post-war Polish People's Republic. In 1992, the company was privatized and became a joint stock company. In 2001, the brewing operations were moved to the second site and the first site became a corporate headquarters. In 2014, the company renamed itself to Perła – Browary Lubelskie S.A (Perla – Lublin Breweries).

Perła currently owns two breweries, one in Lublin and one in Zwierzyniec. It is available in UK, US, Germany and Australia and is the largest independent brewery in Poland.

Perla (Pils 5% ABV) was awarded a Bronze Medal at the International Beer Challenge BC 2010 awards in the UK.

== Beers ==
- Perła Chmielowa (the main brand)
- Perła Niepasteryzowana
- Perła Export
- Perła Mocna
- Perła Porter Bałtycki
- Zwierzyniec
- Goolman
- Goolman Strong
- Goolman Gold
- Carmèll

== Marketing ==
The bottles are typically green with a label that prominently features the green-and-red coat of arms of Lublin that features a white buck.

The buck is locally called "Claudy", and the story is that he was caught in a vine of hops and fell in a pond, creating the famous pilsner.
