= Ciotusza Nowa =

- Village
- Location within Poland
- Coordinates: 50°28′N 23°12′E
- Country: Poland
- Voivodeship: Lublin
- County: Tomaszów
- Gmina: Susiec
- Website: https://sites.google.com/view/ciotusza

Ciotusza Nowa [t͡ɕɔˈtuʂa ˈnɔva] is a village in the administrative district of Gmina Susiec, within Tomaszów County, Lublin Voivodeship, in eastern Poland.
