= Majdan Sopocki Pierwszy =

- Village
- Location within Poland
- Coordinates: 50°28′N 23°10′E
- Country: Poland
- Voivodeship: Lublin
- County: Tomaszów
- Gmina: Susiec
- Population: 510

Majdan Sopocki Pierwszy (Polish pronunciation: [ˈmajdan sɔˈpɔtskʲi ˈpjɛrfʂɨ]) is a village in the administrative district of Gmina Susiec, within Tomaszów County, Lublin Voivodeship, in eastern Poland.
