= Obrocz =

- Village
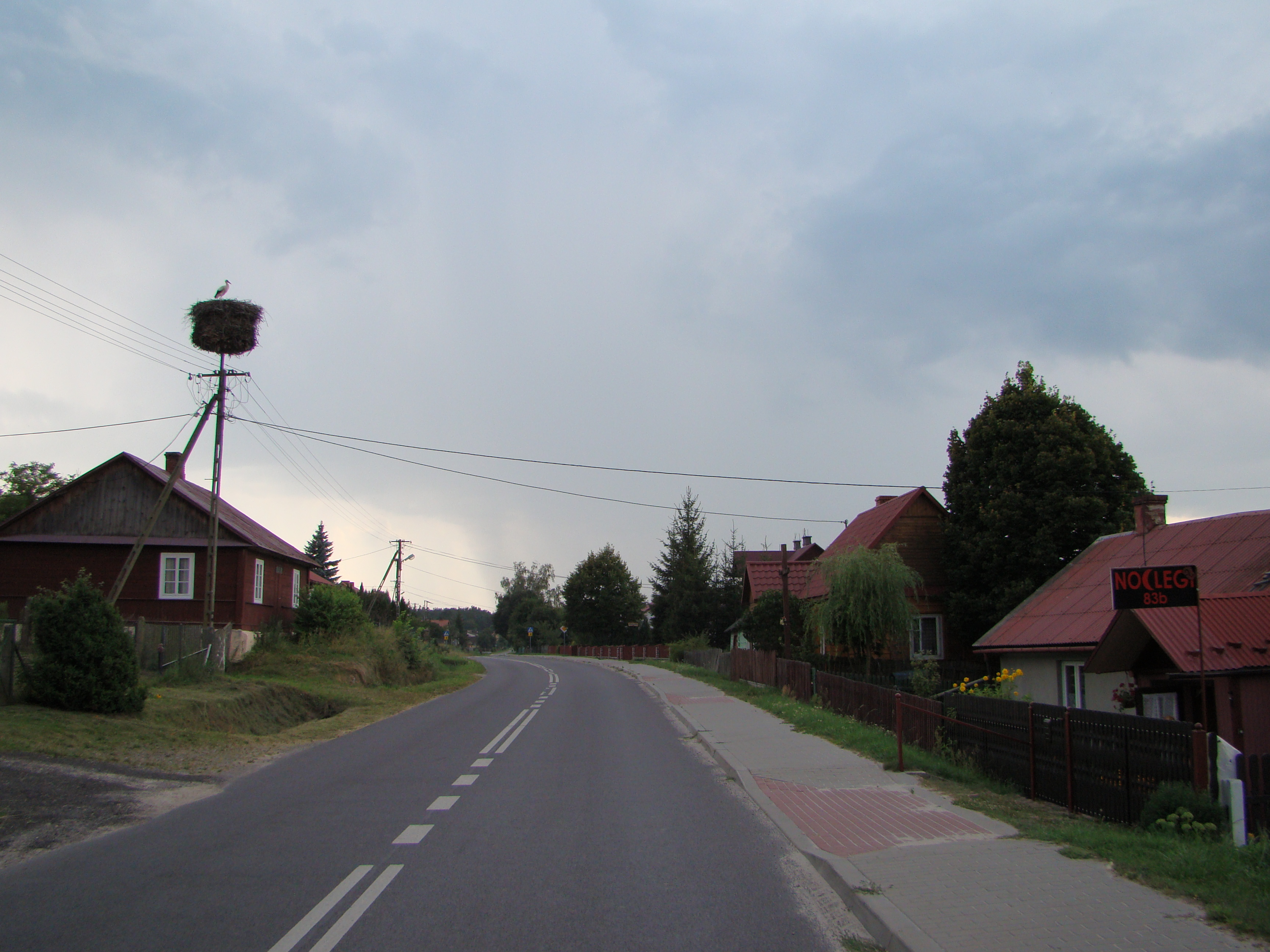

- Location within Poland
- Coordinates: 50°36′N 23°2′E
- Country: Poland
- Voivodeship: Lublin
- County: Zamość
- Gmina: Zwierzyniec
- Time zone: UTC+1 (CET)
  - Summer (DST): UTC+2 (CEST)
- Vehicle registration: LZA

Obrocz [ˈɔbrɔt͡ʂ] is a village in the administrative district of Gmina Zwierzyniec, within Zamość County, Lublin Voivodeship, in eastern Poland.

== History ==
In 1827, the village had a population of 231.

During the German occupation of Poland in World War II, on 28 October 1942, the German gendarmerie and Ukrainian Auxiliary Police committed a massacre of 28 Poles they accused of belonging to the Polish resistance movement and sheltering partisans. Among the 22 identified victims were men and women between the ages of 15 and 62. After the war, the remains were exhumed and buried at the cemetery in Zwierzyniec, and a memorial was unveiled at the site of the massacre.
