= Gmina Susiec =

Gmina Susiec Susiec Commune
- Gmina
- Coat of arms
- Interactive map of Gmina Susiec
- Coordinates (Susiec): 50°26′N 23°10′E
- Country: Poland
- Voivodeship: Lublin
- County: Tomaszów
- Seat: Susiec

Area
  - Total: 190.52 km^{2} (73.56 sq mi)

Population (2013)
  - Total: 7,741
  - Density: 40.63/km^{2} (105.2/sq mi)
- Website: http://www.susiec.pl

Gmina Susiec is a rural gmina (administrative district) in Tomaszów County, Lublin Voivodeship, in eastern Poland. Its seat is the village of Susiec, which lies approximately 18 kilometres (11 mi) west of Tomaszów Lubelski and 100 km (62 mi) south-east of the regional capital Lublin.

The gmina covers an area of 190.52 square kilometres (73.6 sq mi), and as of 2006 its total population is 7,822 (7,741 in 2013).

The gmina contains parts of the protected areas called Krasnobród Landscape Park and Puszcza Solska Landscape Park.

== Villages ==
Gmina Susiec contains the villages and settlements of Ciotusza Nowa, Ciotusza Stara, Dmitroce, Grabowica, Huta Szumy, Kniazie, Koszele, Kunki, Łasochy, Łosiniec, Łuszczacz, Majdan Sopocki Drugi, Majdan Sopocki Pierwszy, Maziły, Nowiny, Oseredek, Paary, Podrusów, Rebizanty, Róża, Rybnica, Rybnica-Niwka, Sikliwce, Skwarki, Susiec, Świdy, Wólka Łosiniecka, Zagóra, Zagrodniki, Zawadki and Zuby.

== Neighbouring gminas ==
Gmina Susiec is bordered by the gminas of Józefów, Krasnobród, Łukowa, Narol, Obsza and Tomaszów Lubelski.
