= Łosiniec, Gmina Susiec =

Łosiniec
- Village
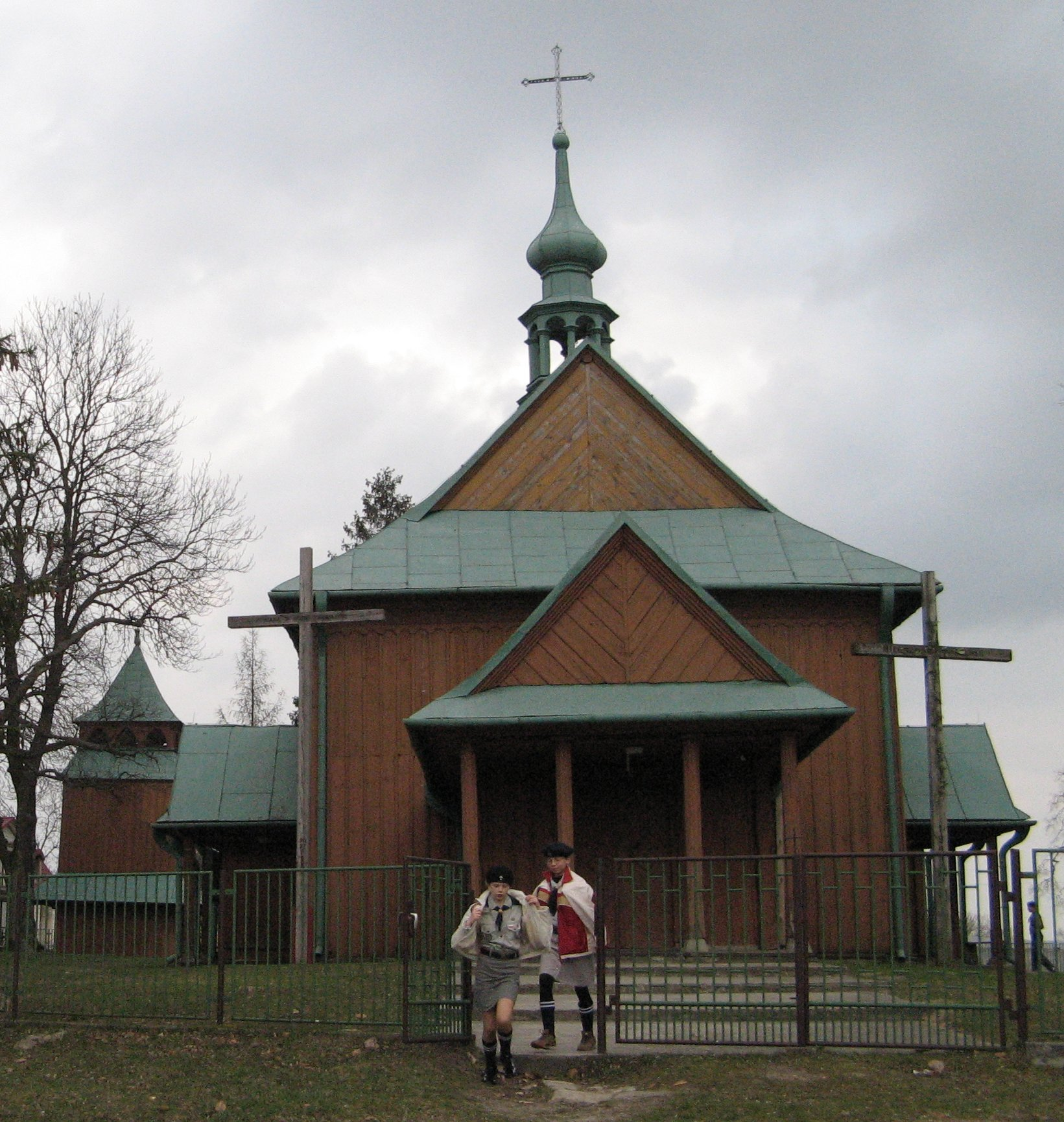
- Girl Scouts in front of a Catholic church in Łosiniec

- Location within Poland
- Coordinates: 50°24′52″N 23°17′45″E
- Country: Poland
- Voivodeship: Lublin
- County: Tomaszów
- Gmina: Susiec

Łosiniec [wɔˈɕiɲɛt͡s] is a village in the administrative district of Gmina Susiec, within Tomaszów County, Lublin Voivodeship, in eastern Poland.

== See also ==
- Roztocze
- Roztocze National Park
