= Guciów =

- Village
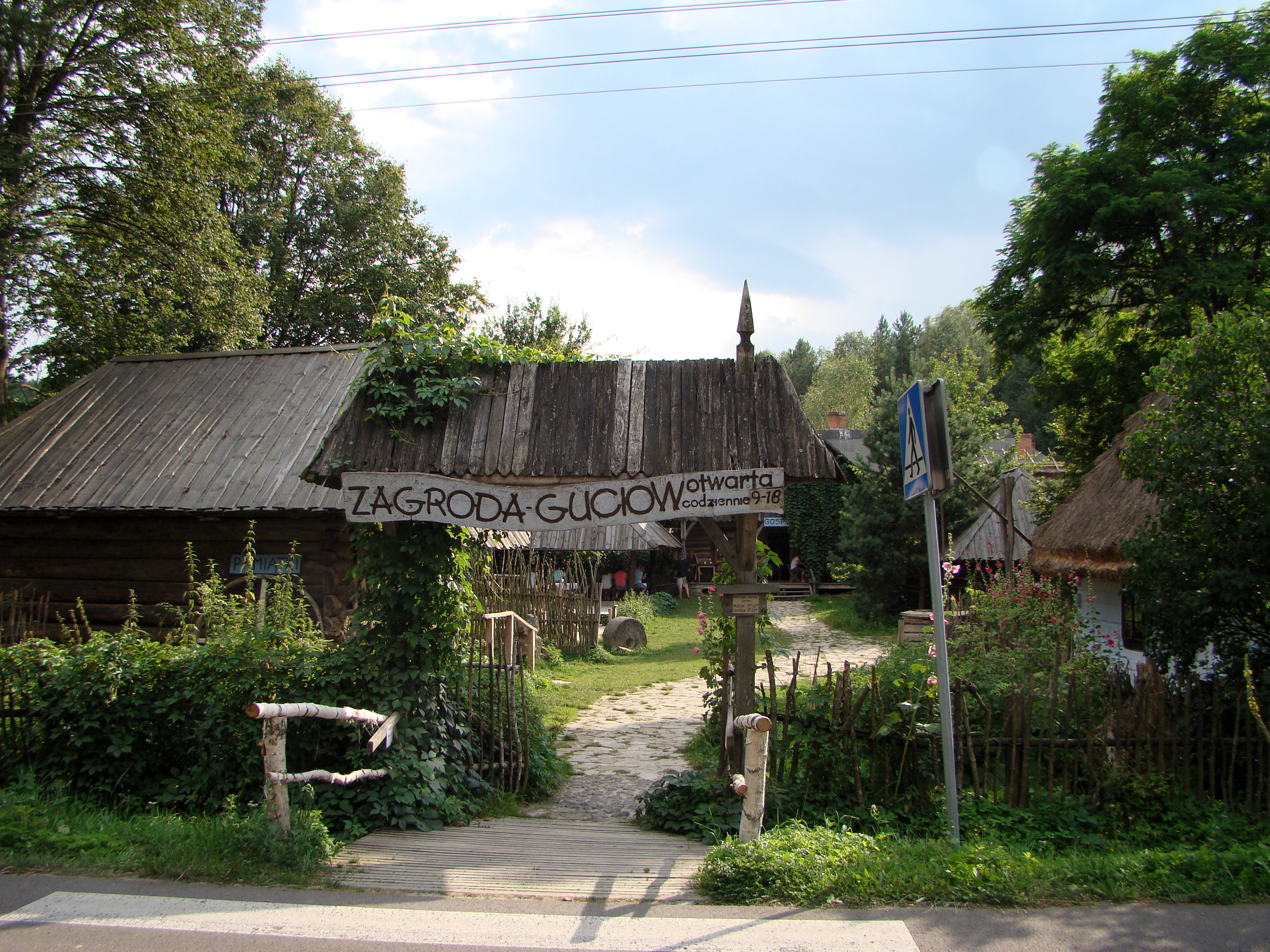
- Ethnographic museum in Guciów

- Location within Poland
- Coordinates: 50°34′N 23°4′E
- Country: Poland
- Voivodeship: Lublin
- County: Zamość
- Gmina: Zwierzyniec

Guciów [ˈɡut͡ɕuf] is a village in the administrative district of Gmina Zwierzyniec, within Zamość County, Lublin Voivodeship, in eastern Poland.
