= Bór, Zamość County =

Bór
- Settlement
- Location within Poland
- Coordinates: 50°37′18″N 23°3′36″E
- Country: Poland
- Voivodeship: Lublin
- County: Zamość
- Gmina: Zwierzyniec
- Population: 48

Bór [bur] is a settlement in the administrative district of Gmina Zwierzyniec, within Zamość County, Lublin Voivodeship, in eastern Poland.
