= Majdan Sopocki Drugi =

- Village
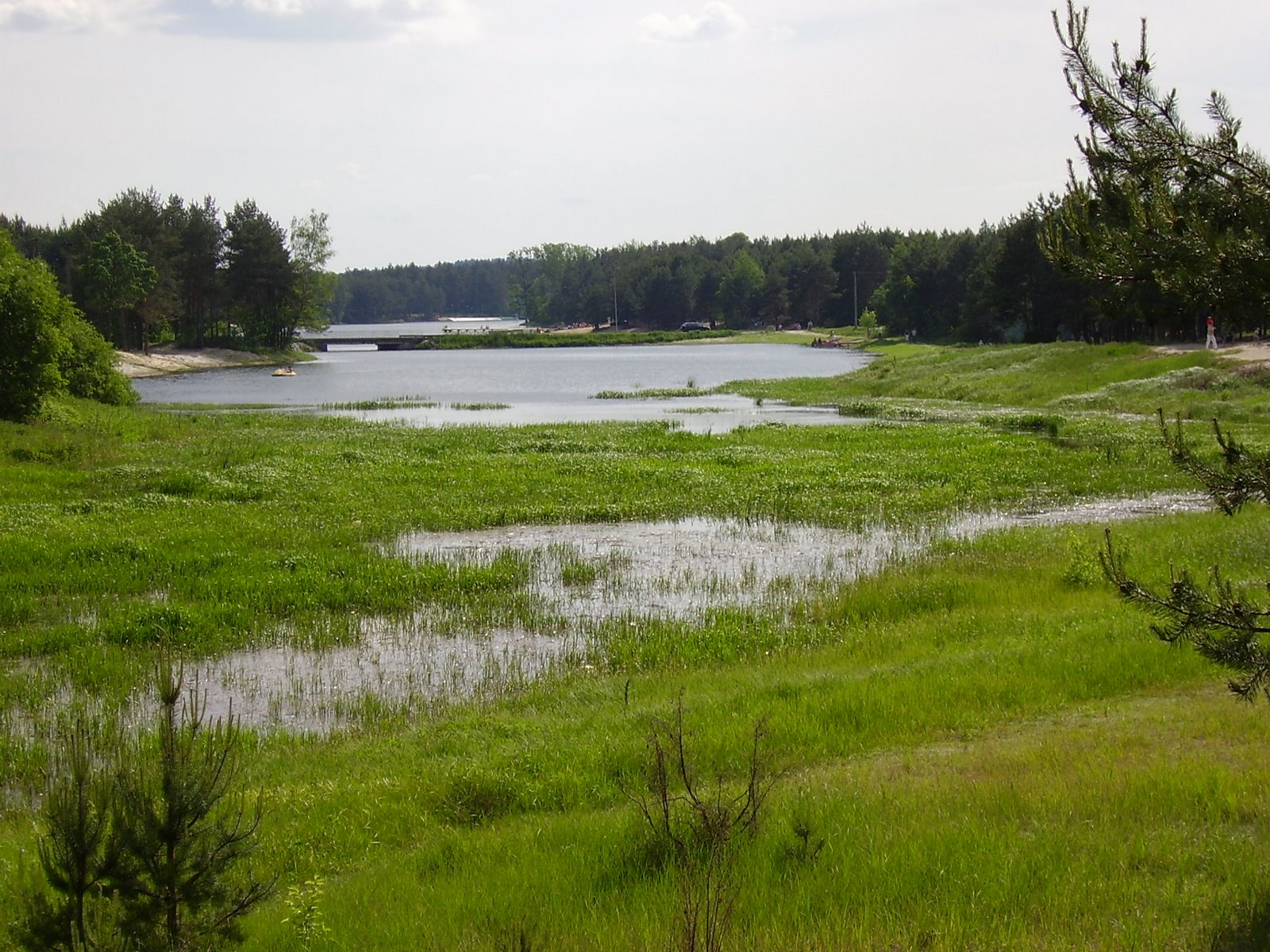

- Location within Poland
- Coordinates: 50°29′N 23°10′E
- Country: Poland
- Voivodeship: Lublin
- County: Tomaszów
- Gmina: Susiec

Population
  - Total: 712
- Time zone: UTC+1 (CET)
  - Summer (DST): UTC+2 (CEST)

Majdan Sopocki Drugi (Polish pronunciation: [ˈmajdan sɔˈpɔtskʲi ˈdruɡʲi]) is a village in the administrative district of Gmina Susiec, within Tomaszów County, Lublin Voivodeship, in eastern Poland.

== History ==
Eleven Polish citizens were murdered by Nazi Germany in the village during World War II.
