= Skwarki, Lublin Voivodeship =

Skwarki
- Settlement
- Location within Poland
- Coordinates: 50°24′56″N 23°13′10″E
- Country: Poland
- Voivodeship: Lublin
- County: Tomaszów
- Gmina: Susiec

Skwarki [ˈskfarki] is a settlement in the administrative district of Gmina Susiec, within Tomaszów County, Lublin Voivodeship, in eastern Poland.
