= Kniazie, Gmina Susiec =

Kniazie
- Settlement
- Location within Poland
- Coordinates: 50°25′34″N 23°17′58″E
- Country: Poland
- Voivodeship: Lublin
- County: Tomaszów
- Gmina: Susiec

Kniazie [ˈkɲaʑɛ] is a settlement in the administrative district of Gmina Susiec, within Tomaszów County, Lublin Voivodeship, in eastern Poland.
