= Grabowica, Lublin Voivodeship =

Grabowica
- Village
- Location within Poland
- Coordinates: 50°27′N 23°13′E
- Country: Poland
- Voivodeship: Lublin
- County: Tomaszów
- Gmina: Susiec

Grabowica [ɡrabɔˈvit͡sa] is a village in the administrative district of Gmina Susiec, within Tomaszów County, Lublin Voivodeship, in eastern Poland.
