= Wólka Łosiniecka =

- Village
- Location within Poland
- Coordinates: 50°26′N 23°17′E
- Country: Poland
- Voivodeship: Lublin
- County: Tomaszów
- Gmina: Susiec

Wólka Łosiniecka [ˈvulka wɔɕiˈɲɛt͡ska] is a village in the administrative district of Gmina Susiec, within Tomaszów County, Lublin Voivodeship, in eastern Poland.
