= Podrusów =

- Settlement
- Location within Poland
- Coordinates: 50°28′07″N 23°10′31″E
- Country: Poland
- Voivodeship: Lublin
- County: Tomaszów
- Gmina: Susiec

Podrusów [pɔˈdrusuf] is a settlement in the administrative district of Gmina Susiec, within Tomaszów County, Lublin Voivodeship, in eastern Poland. It is around 30 km (19 mi) south of Zamość.
