= Oseredek =

- Village
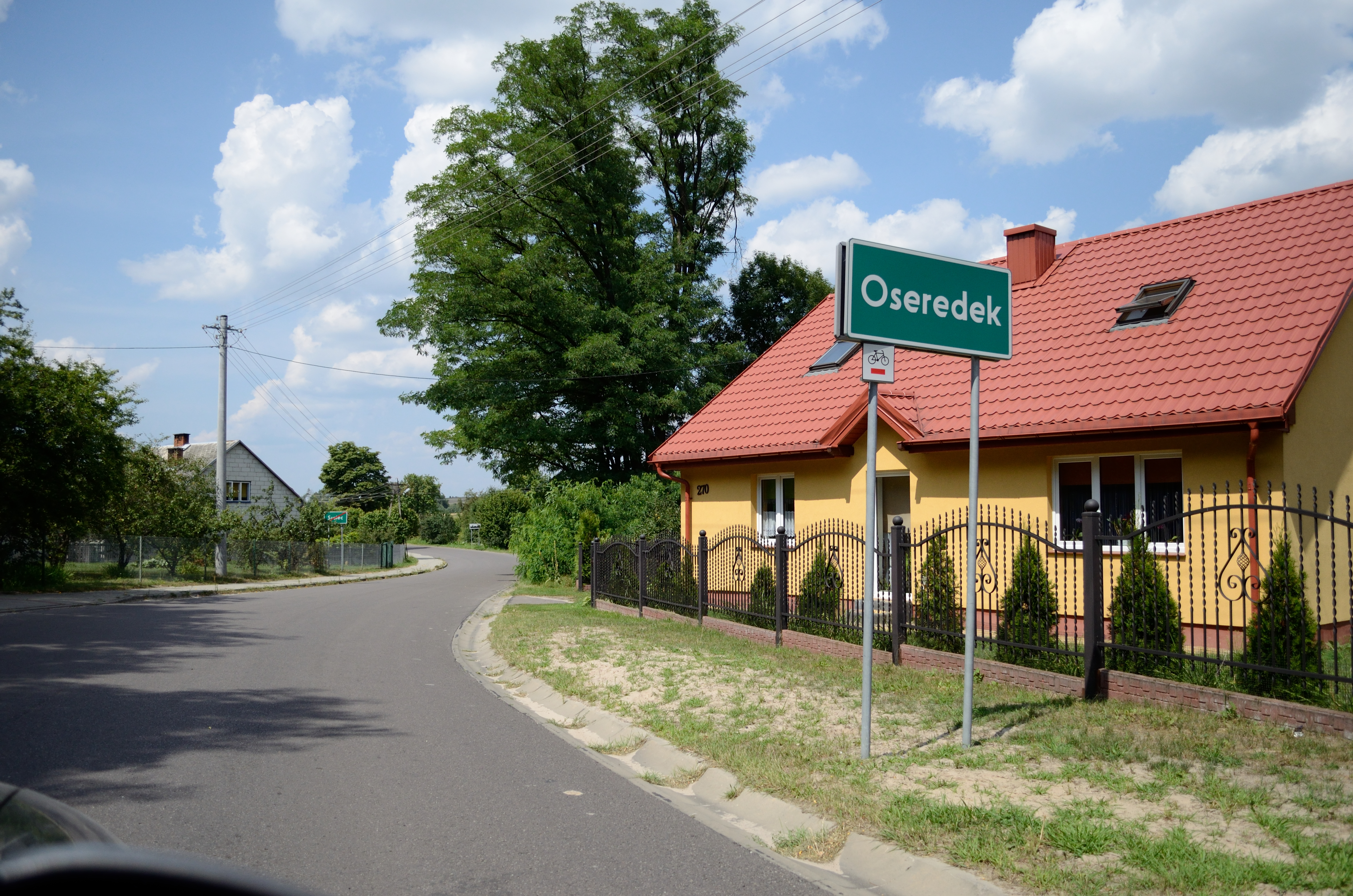
- Street and road sign of Oseredek

- Location within Poland
- Coordinates: 50°25′40″N 23°09′42″E
- Country: Poland
- Voivodeship: Lublin
- County: Tomaszów
- Gmina: Susiec

Oseredek [ɔsɛˈrɛdɛk] is a village in the administrative district of Gmina Susiec, within Tomaszów County, Lublin Voivodeship, in eastern Poland.
