= Zuby, Poland =

Zuby
- Settlement
- Location within Poland
- Coordinates: 50°27′44″N 23°11′5″E
- Country: Poland
- Voivodeship: Lublin
- County: Tomaszów
- Gmina: Susiec

Zuby [ˈzubɨ] is a settlement in the administrative district of Gmina Susiec, within Tomaszów County, Lublin Voivodeship, in eastern Poland.
