= Huta Szumy =

- Village
- Location within Poland
- Coordinates: 50°22′36″N 23°14′31″E
- Country: Poland
- Voivodeship: Lublin
- County: Tomaszów
- Gmina: Susiec

Huta Szumy [ˈxuta ˈʂumɨ] is a village in the administrative district of Gmina Susiec, within Tomaszów County, Lublin Voivodeship, in eastern Poland. The village is located in the historical region of Galicia.
