= Maziły =

- Village
- Location within Poland
- Coordinates: 50°24′N 23°20′E
- Country: Poland
- Voivodeship: Lublin
- County: Tomaszów
- Gmina: Susiec

Maziły [maˈʑiwɨ] is a village in the administrative district of Gmina Susiec, within Tomaszów County, Lublin Voivodeship, in eastern Poland.
