= Bagno, Lublin Voivodeship =

Bagno
- Village
- Location within Poland
- Coordinates: 50°38′N 22°58′E
- Country: Poland
- Voivodeship: Lublin
- County: Zamość
- Gmina: Zwierzyniec

Bagno [ˈbaɡnɔ] is a village in the administrative district of Gmina Zwierzyniec, within Zamość County, Lublin Voivodeship, in eastern Poland.
