= Nowiny, Gmina Susiec =

Nowiny
- Village
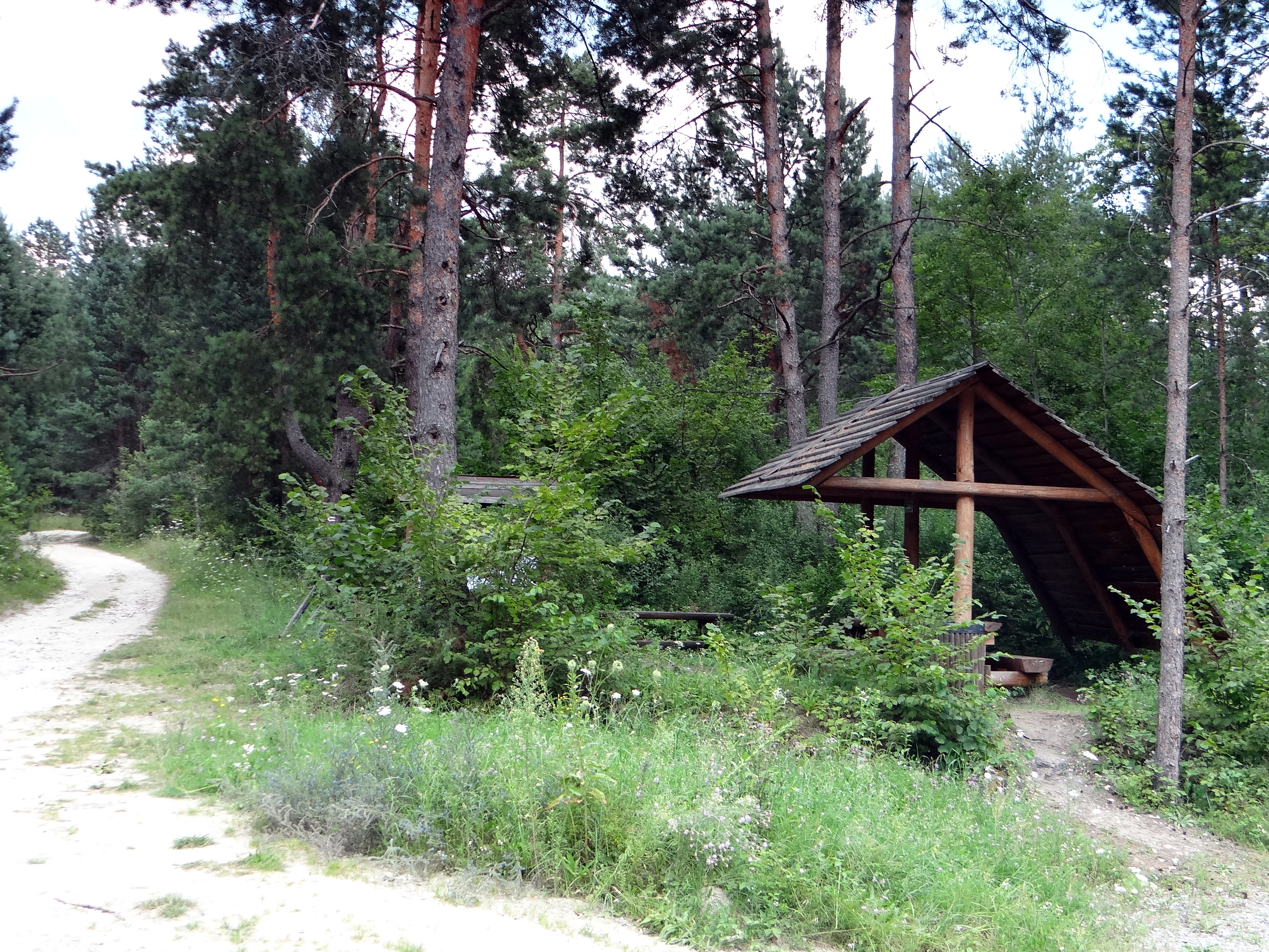
- Hut in Nowiny

- Location within Poland
- Coordinates: 50°26′57″N 23°08′05″E
- Country: Poland
- Voivodeship: Lublin
- County: Tomaszów
- Gmina: Susiec

Nowiny [nɔˈvinɨ] is a village in the administrative district of Gmina Susiec, within Tomaszów County, Lublin Voivodeship, in eastern Poland.
