= Zagrodniki, Lublin Voivodeship =

Zagrodniki
- Village
- Location within Poland
- Coordinates: 50°24′03″N 23°19′57″E
- Country: Poland
- Voivodeship: Lublin
- County: Tomaszów
- Gmina: Susiec

Zagrodniki [zaɡrɔdˈniki] is a village in the administrative district of Gmina Susiec, within Tomaszów County, Lublin Voivodeship, in eastern Poland.
