= Koszele, Lublin Voivodeship =

Koszele
- Settlement
- Location within Poland
- Coordinates: 50°24′30″N 23°15′10″E
- Country: Poland
- Voivodeship: Lublin
- County: Tomaszów
- Gmina: Susiec

Koszele [kɔˈʂɛlɛ] is a settlement in the administrative district of Gmina Susiec, within Tomaszów County, Lublin Voivodeship, in eastern Poland.
