= Kosobudy, Lublin Voivodeship =

Kosobudy
- Village
- Location within Poland
- Coordinates: 50°37′48″N 23°4′43″E
- Country: Poland
- Voivodeship: Lublin
- County: Zamość
- Gmina: Zwierzyniec

Population
  - Total: 460
- Time zone: UTC+1 (CET)
  - Summer (DST): UTC+2 (CEST)

Kosobudy [kɔsɔˈbudɨ] is a village in the administrative district of Gmina Zwierzyniec, within Zamość County, Lublin Voivodeship, in eastern Poland.

== History ==
Seven Polish citizens were murdered by Nazi Germany in the village during World War II.
