= Roztocze National Park =

National park in Poland

- Roztoczański Park Narodowy
- IUCN category II (national park)
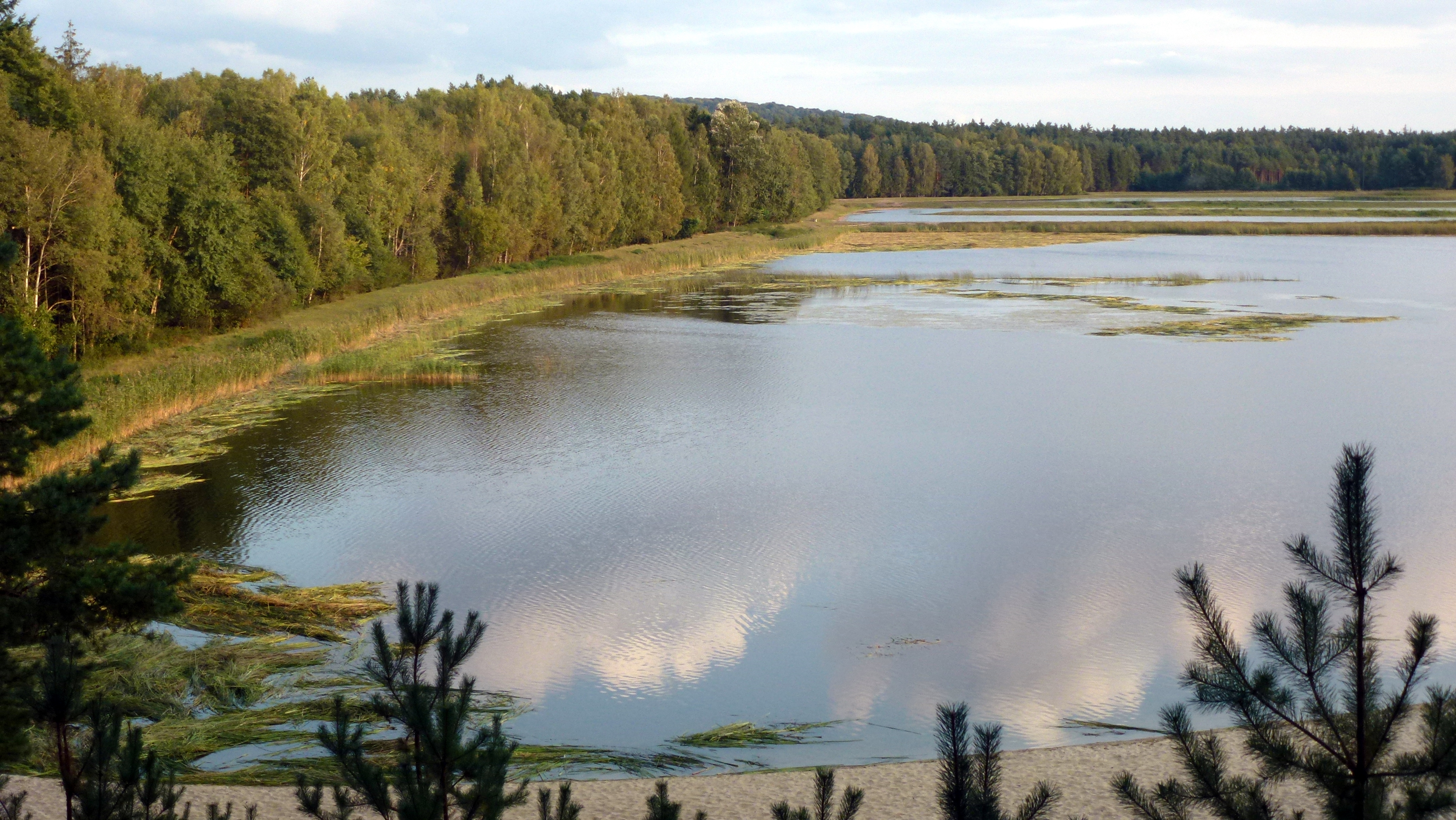
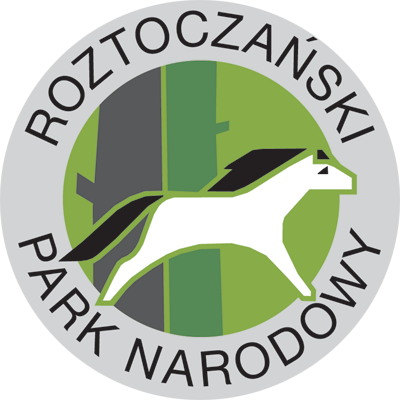
- Echo Lake near Zwierzyniec The park logo

- Location within Poland
- Location: Lublin Voivodeship, Poland
- Nearest city: Lublin
- Coordinates: 50°21′55″N 22°34′48″E
- Area: 84.83 km^{2} (32.75 sq mi)
- Established: 1974
- Governing body: Ministry of the Environment
- Website: Official website

Roztocze National Park (Polish: Roztoczański Park Narodowy) is a national park in Lublin Voivodeship of southeastern Poland. It protects the most valuable natural areas of the middle part of the Roztocze range. Its current size is 84.83 km^{2} (32.75 sq mi), of which forests occupy 81.02 km^{2}, and strictly protected areas 8.06 km^{2}. The park has its headquarters in Zwierzyniec.

== History ==
The history of this area is closely connected with the Zamoyski family estate, which was founded in 1589. The estate's headquarters were at Zwierzyniec.

The beginnings of nature protection in the region date to 1934, when the Bukowa Góra Preserve was created (now it is a strictly protected area). In 1938, for the first time in Poland, a bill was issued that stated that prey birds on the Zamoyski family estate were protected. The park was created from State Forests of the districts of Kosobudy and Zwierzyniec, which had belonged to the Zamoyski family estate.

The area of the park and adjacent lands witnessed numerous battles during the Polish January Uprising and both World Wars. Tragic reminiscences of these times are in cemeteries in Zwierzyniec and other locations.

Roztocze National Park was created in 1974 and initially covered an area of 48.01 km^{2}. The park's management is in the restored house of the former Zamoyski estate's administrator in Zwierzyniec.

== Geography ==
The park is located in the picturesque Roztocze Środkowe region in the upper Wieprz river valley. These parts separate Lublin Upland (Polish: Wyżyna Lubelska) from Sandomierz Dale (Polish: Kotlina Sandomierska). The water of the main river running through the park — the Wieprz — is of the second class of purity. There are two streams that originate here: the Szum (2.5 km) and the Świerszcz (7.5 km).

Roztoczański National Park boasts unique tree formations. There are more than 400 ancient trees there referred to as "nature monuments" as well as some of the largest firs in all of in Poland (up to 50 meters high). Tourists have a choice of using five walking trails or a dedicated bicycle trail.

== Wildlife ==
Among mammals living in the park are common red deer, roe deer, Central European boar, red fox, Eurasian wolf, and European badger. In 1979 Eurasian beavers were reintroduced and now colonies of the mammal thrive in the Wieprz valley. In 1982 Koniks were brought here.

There have been registered around 190 species of birds, including eagles, storks, and woodpeckers. Reptiles are represented by lizards, common European adders, and grass snakes as well as the endangered European pond turtle. Insect fauna is interesting, with more than 2000 species.

== Gallery ==
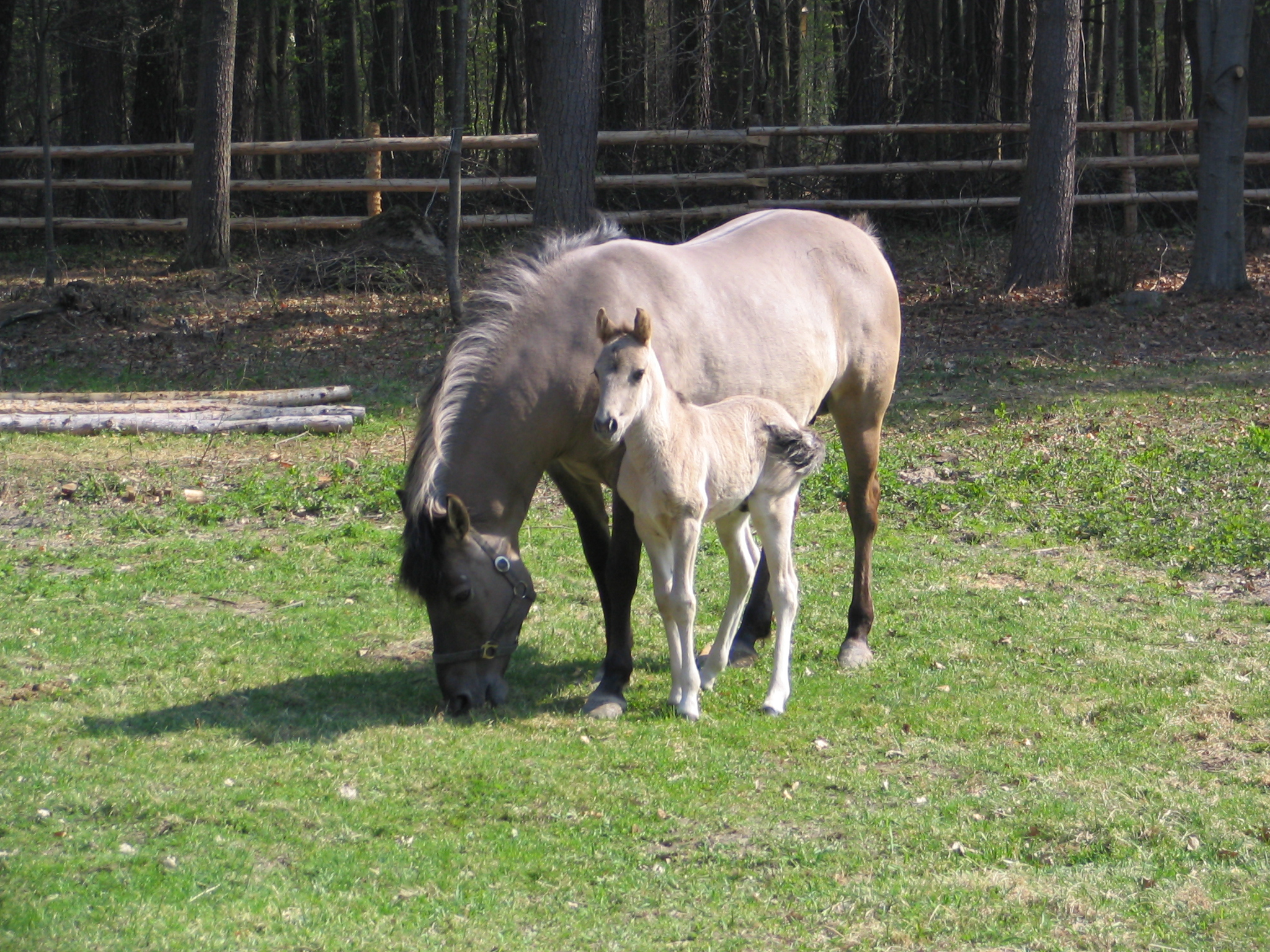
Polish ponies in the Roztocze National Park

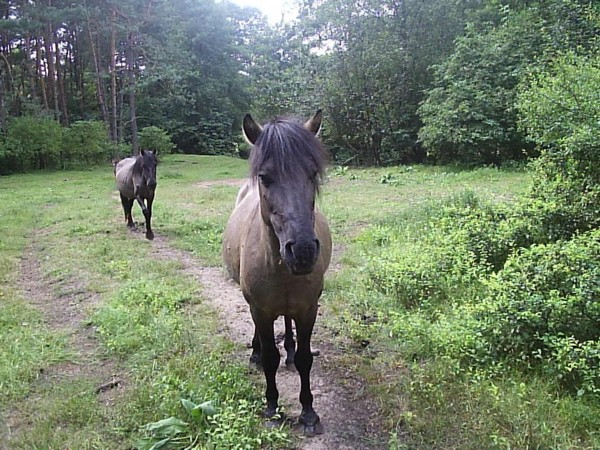
Polish ponies, a.k.a. "koniki"

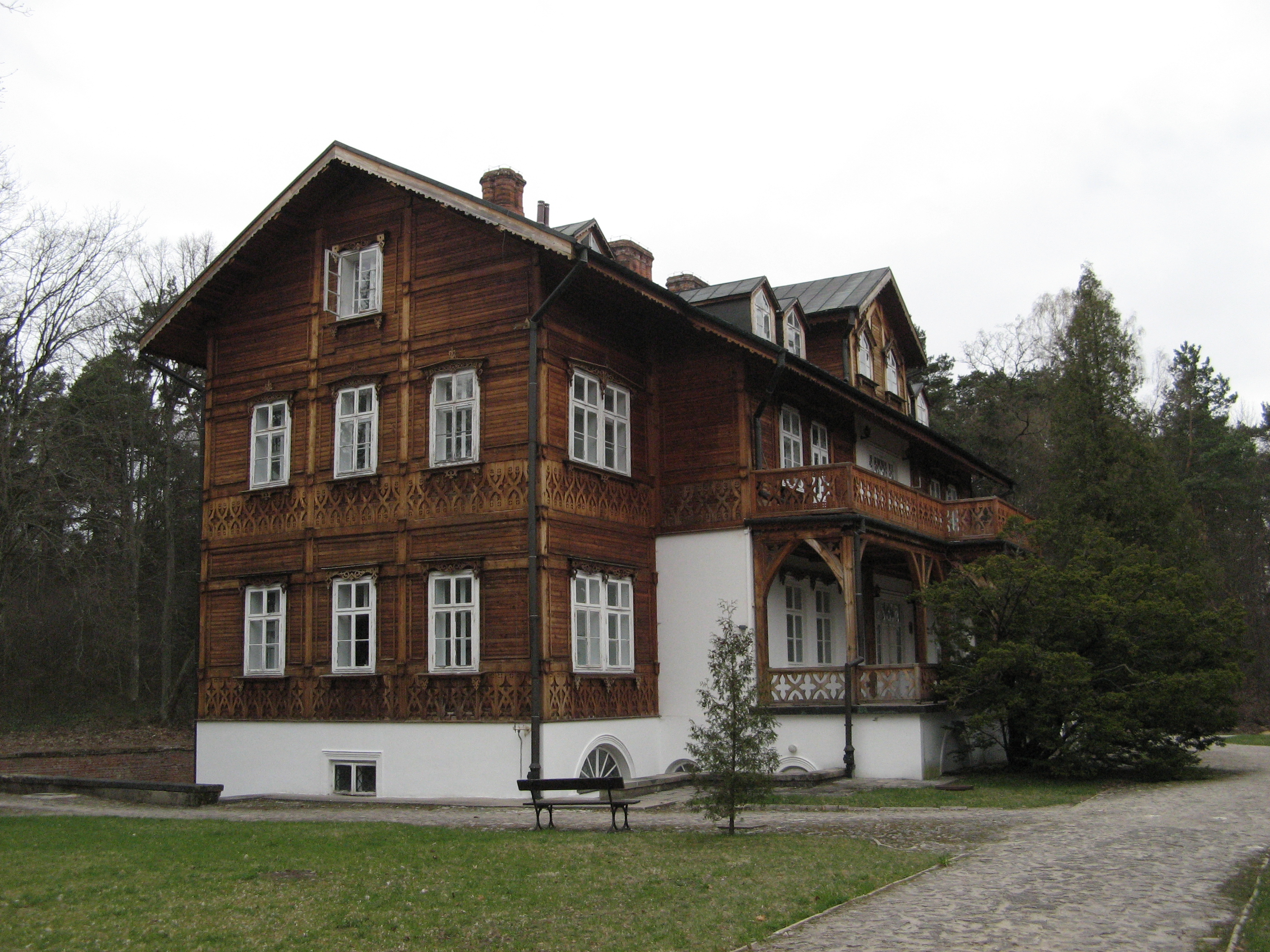
Headquarters of Roztocze National Park, Zwierzyniec

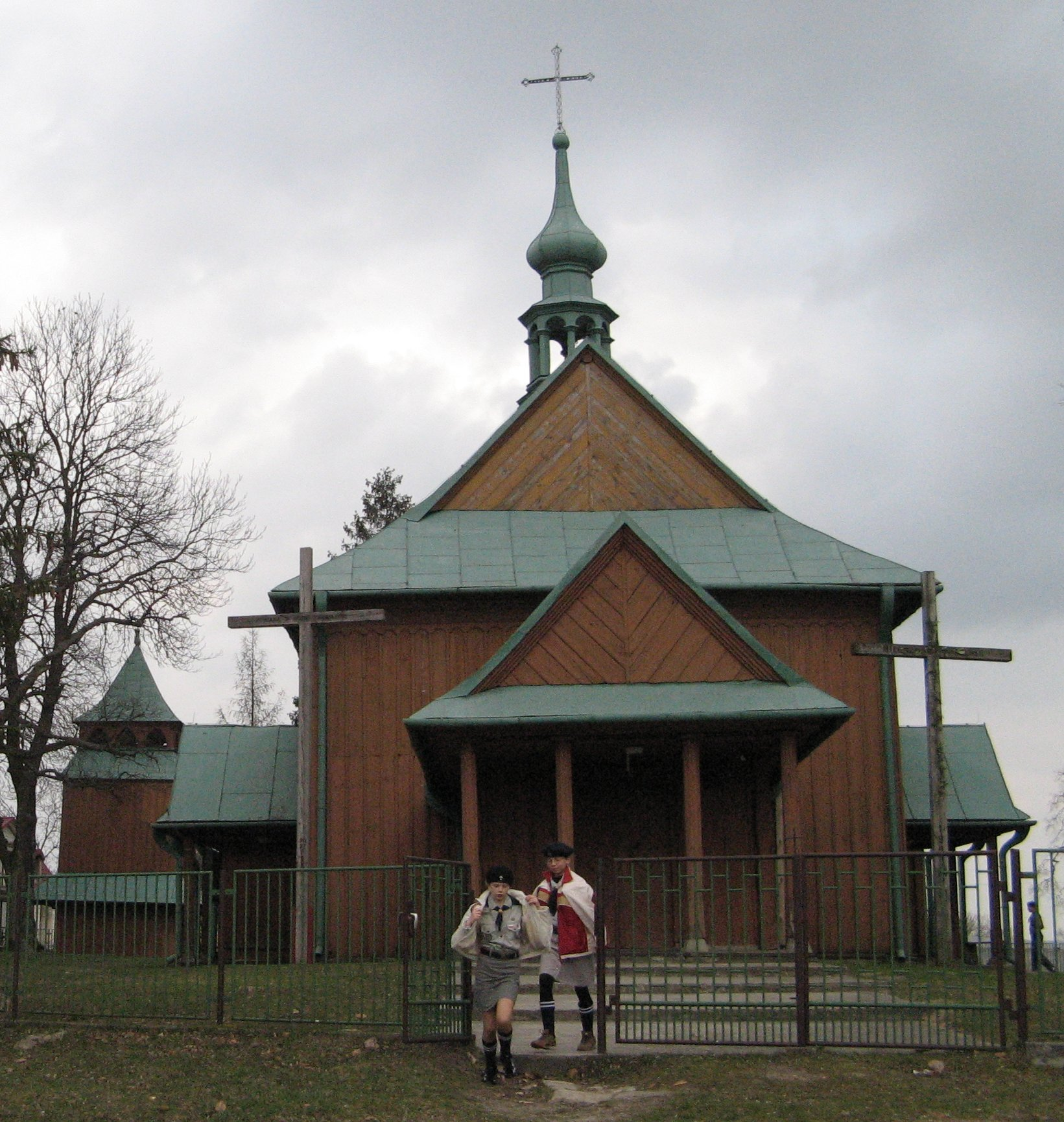
Girl Scouts in front of a Catholic church in Łosiniec
