= Majdan Stary, Biłgoraj County =

Majdan Stary
- Village
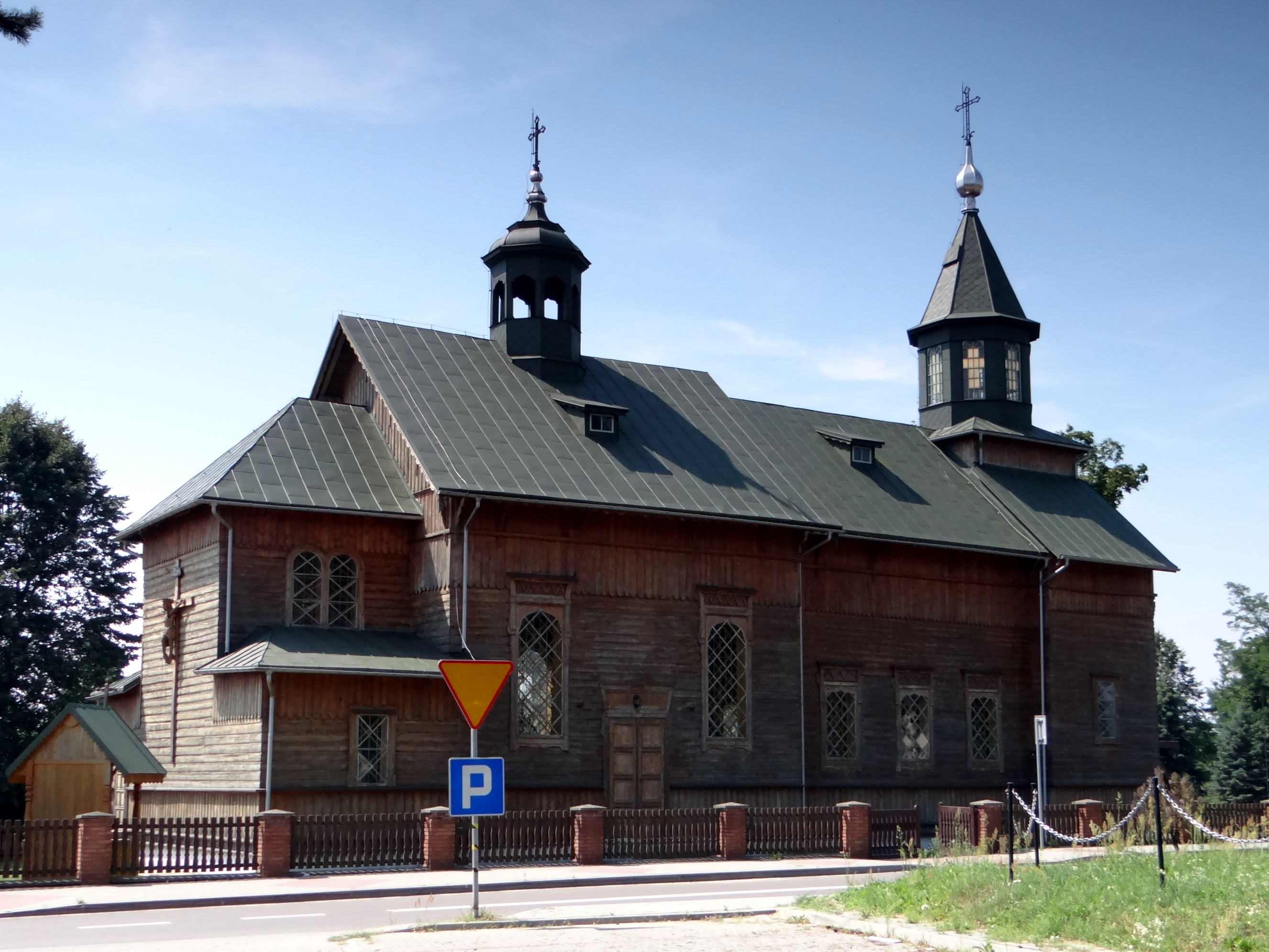

- Location within Poland
- Coordinates: 50°28′19″N 22°41′56″E
- Country: Poland
- Voivodeship: Lublin
- County: Biłgoraj
- Gmina: Księżpol

Population
  - Total: 746
- Website: http://www.majdan.com.pl

Majdan Stary (Polish pronunciation: [ˈmajdan ˈstarɨ]) is a village in the administrative district of Gmina Księżpol, within Biłgoraj County, Lublin Voivodeship, in eastern Poland.

== History ==
During the Nazi occupation of Poland, on July 3, 1943, around 75 inhabitants of Majdan Stary, including women and children, were massacred by the German punitive expedition. The village was burned.
