= Gmina Zwierzyniec =

Gmina Zwierzyniec Zwierzyniec Commune
- Gmina
- Coat of arms
- Interactive map of Gmina Zwierzyniec
- Coordinates (Zwierzyniec): 50°37′N 22°58′E
- Country: Poland
- Voivodeship: Lublin
- County: Zamość County
- Seat: Zwierzyniec

Area
  - Total: 156.78 km^{2} (60.53 sq mi)

Population (2013)
  - Total: 7,067
  - Density: 45.08/km^{2} (116.7/sq mi)
  - Urban: 3,347
  - Rural: 3,720
- Website: http://www.zwierzyniec.info.pl

Gmina Zwierzyniec is an urban-rural gmina (administrative district) in Zamość County, Lublin Voivodeship, in eastern Poland. Its seat is the town of Zwierzyniec, which lies approximately 24 kilometres (15 mi) south-west of Zamość and 76 km (47 mi) south of the regional capital Lublin.

The gmina covers an area of 156.78 square kilometres (60.5 sq mi), and as of 2006 its total population is 7,251 (out of which the population of Zwierzyniec amounts to 3,344, and the population of the rural part of the gmina is 3,907).

== Villages ==
Apart from the town of Zwierzyniec, Gmina Zwierzyniec contains the villages and settlements of Bagno, Bór, Guciów, Kosobudy and Obrocz.

== Neighbouring gminas ==
Gmina Zwierzyniec is bordered by the gminas of Adamów, Józefów, Krasnobród, Radecznica, Szczebrzeszyn, Tereszpol and Zamość.
