= Andrzej Heidrich =

Polish graphic artist

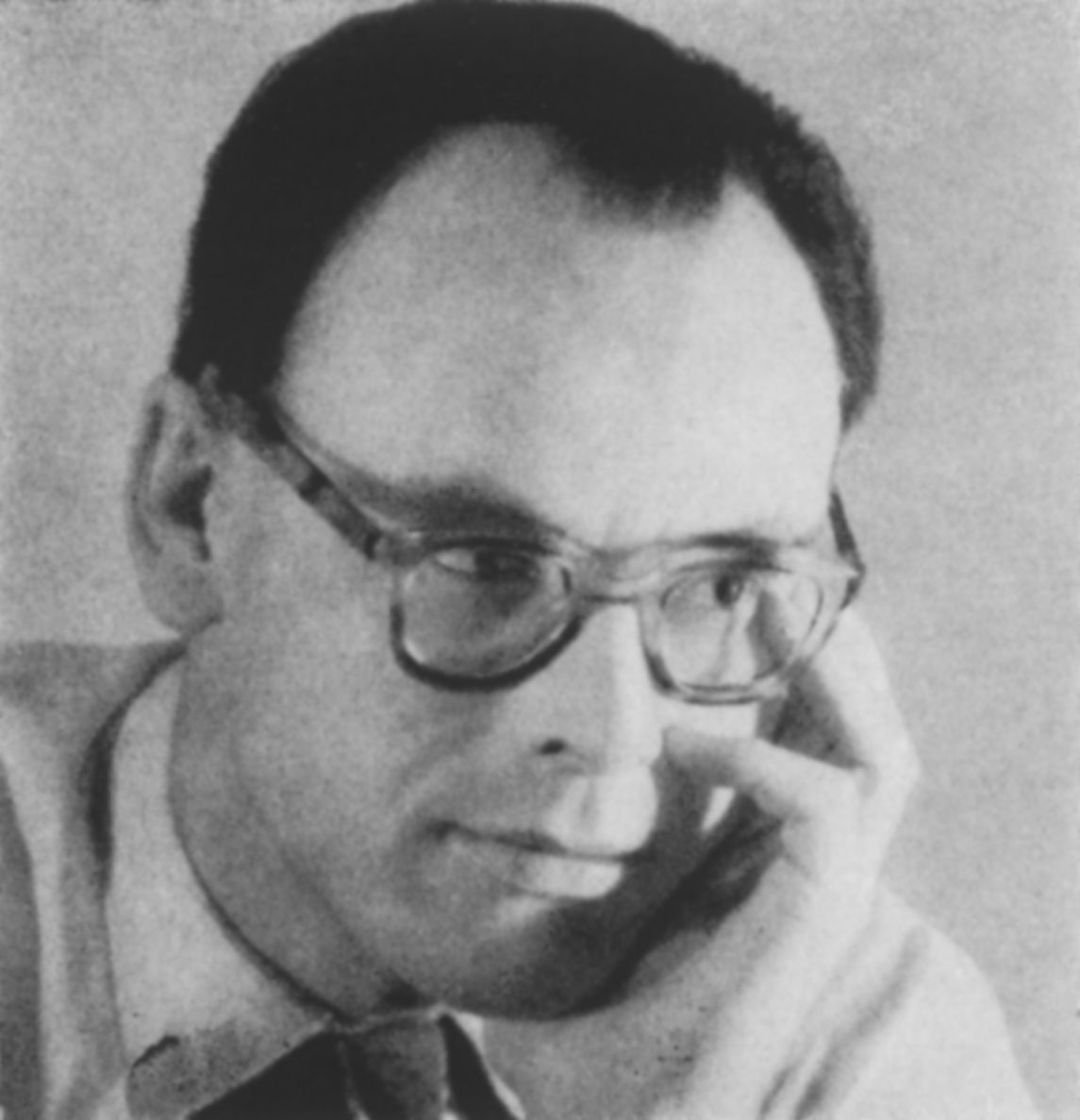
- Andrzej Heidrich (before 1965)
- Born: November 6, 1928; Warsaw, Poland
- Died: October 20, 2019 (aged 90); Warsaw, Poland
- Education: Academy of Fine Arts
- Occupation: Graphic artist

Andrzej Ryszard Heidrich (November 6, 1928 – October 20, 2019) was a Polish graphic artist and type designer who designed Polish bank notes. He studied at the Academy of Fine Arts and graduated with honors.

He designed bank notes for the National Bank of Poland since 1960, however the first bank note designed by him that went into circulation was a 500 złotych from 1974 portraying military leader Tadeusz Kościuszko.

He also designed covers and illustrated books by Polish authors such as: Stanisław Lem, Ryszard Kapuściński, Jarosław Iwaszkiewicz, and Leszek Kołakowski. From 1974 to 1989 he was the chief graphic designer of the Czytelnik Publishing House.

== Education ==
=== Primary School ===
Military Family School (Polish: Szkoła Rodziny Wojskowej) in Żoliborz

=== Middle School ===
The middle school of printmaking

=== High School ===
The famous Fine Arts High School

== Font design ==
The font Bona Nova was designed by Heidrich in 1971.

== Book Covers ==
Book Covers made by Heidrich include:

- His Master's Voice by Stanisław Lem
- Shah of Shahs by Ryszard Kapuściński
- A Perfect Vacuum by Ryszard Kapuściński

== Stamps ==
- A line of stamps featuring Historical figures including Meiszko I, Kazimierz Weilki, Kazimierz Jagiellonczyk, Andrzej Frycz Modrzewski, and Tadeusz Tosciuszko.
- A line of stamps featuring Kinds of butterflies.
- A line of stamps featuring medicinal plants.
- A line of stamps featuring landscapes of places in Poland.
- Two stamps of buildings in Kraków.
- Two stamps featuring Nicolaus Copernicus.
- A stamp featuring the Mniszech Palace.
- A stamp for the 20th Anniversary of the Polish People's Republic.
- A stamp featuring a Train.
- A stamp featuring St. Hedwig.
- A stamp featuring Frédéric Chopin.
- A stamp featuring a Brontosaurus.

== Work on flags and Coats of arms ==
Flag of the Masovian Voivodeship

=== Flags ===
- Flag of the Lublin Voivodeship (Adopted 14 June 2004)
- Flag of the Masovian Voivodeship (Adopted 29 May 2006)

Coat of arms of the Lublin Voivodeship

=== Coats of arms ===
- Coat of arms of the Lublin Voivodeship(Adopted 14 June 2004)
- Coat of arms of the Masovian Voivodeship (Adopted 29 May 2006)

== Other Notable Credits ==
- Production Designer for 1966 short film Blekitny kaczorek
- Designer of poster for Polish release of Japanese movie Onna no Koyomi
- Designer of poster for the film Spellbound (Polish: Urzeczona)
- Designer of the Medical University of Warsaw's emblem
- The "Gallery of Portraits of Polish Rulers”, 44 watercolour miniatures depicting images of Polish kings and dukes.
- Created design of passports.
- Designed the Eagle emblem on military caps, police badges, and distinctions for Polish soldiers who fought in Iraq and Afghanistan.
- Painted a series of miniatures with images of Mikołaj Rej, Jan Kochanowski, Adam Mickiewicz and Stanisław Wyspiański.

== Awards and distinctions ==
- Commander 's Cross of the Order of Polonia Restituta - 2014
- Officer's Cross of the Order of Polonia Restituta - 1999
- Knight's Cross of the Order of Polonia Restituta - 1977
- Gold Cross of Merit - 1977
- Gold Medal for Merit to Culture – Gloria Artis - 2006
- Medal of the 40th anniversary of People's Poland
- Medal for Merit to Banking - 1989
