= Krzysztof Komorski =

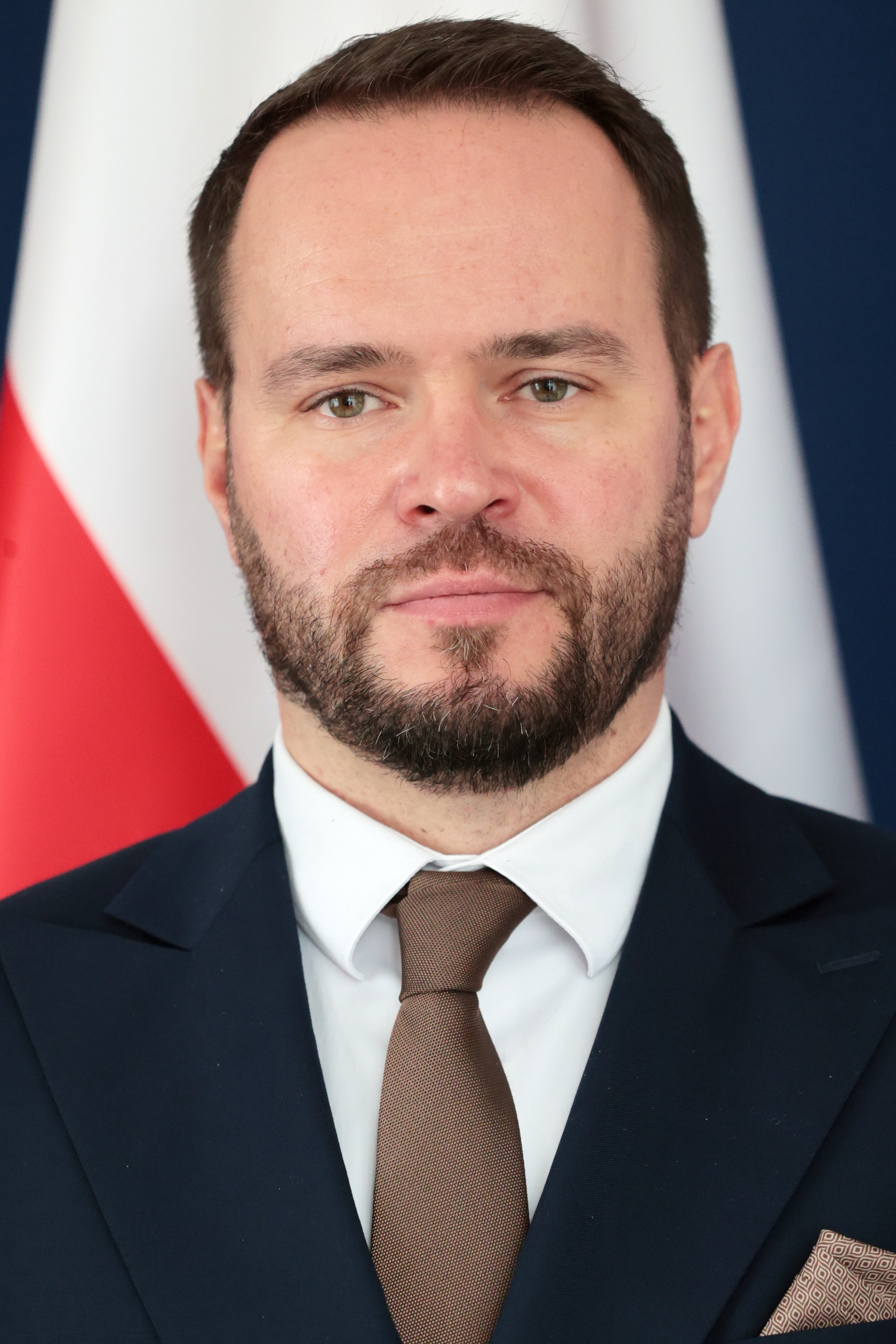

Voivode of Lublin Voivodeship
- Incumbent
- Assumed office 20 December 2023
- President: Andrzej Duda; Karol Nawrocki
- Prime Minister: Donald Tusk
- Preceded by: Lech Sprawka

Personal details
- Born: 24 March 1983 (age 43) Lublin, Polish People's Republic
- Citizenship: Poland
- Party: Civic Platform
- Education: Maria Curie-Skłodowska University
- Occupation: Politician

Krzysztof Komorski (born March 24, 1983 in Lublin) is a Polish politician and local government official. He served as Vice-Mayor of Lublin from 2015 to 2018 and Voivode of Lublin Voivodeship from 2023.

== Biography ==
Born in Lublin, he graduated in sociology from Maria Curie-Skłodowska University. He worked as a local government official at the Lublin City Hall and the Marshal's Office of the Lublin Voivodeship. In 2012, he became Deputy Director of the Strategy and Investor Services Department at the Lublin City Hall, and in 2014, Deputy Director of the Mayor's Office. In January 2015, he became Deputy Mayor of Lublin Krzysztof Żuk, responsible for matters including culture and sports.

He joined the Civic Platform party. In the 2018 elections, he won a seat on the Civic Coalition ticket for the Lublin Voivodeship Sejmik. He resigned from his position as deputy mayor and subsequently served as vice president of the Bystrzyca Municipal Sports and Recreation Center in Lublin. In the 2019 and 2023 elections, he unsuccessfully ran for the Sejm as a member of the Civic Coalition.

On December 20, 2023, he was appointed Voivode of Lublin Voivodeship by Prime Minister Donald Tusk.
