= Lublin Voivodeship =

Voivodeship of Poland

Lublin Voivodeship Województwo lubelskie
- Voivodeship
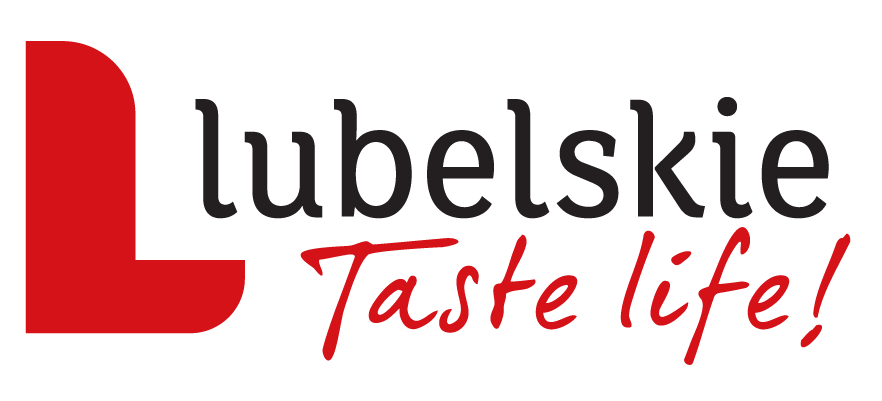
- Flag Coat of arms Brandmark
- Motto: Smakuj życie! (Taste life!)
- Location within Poland

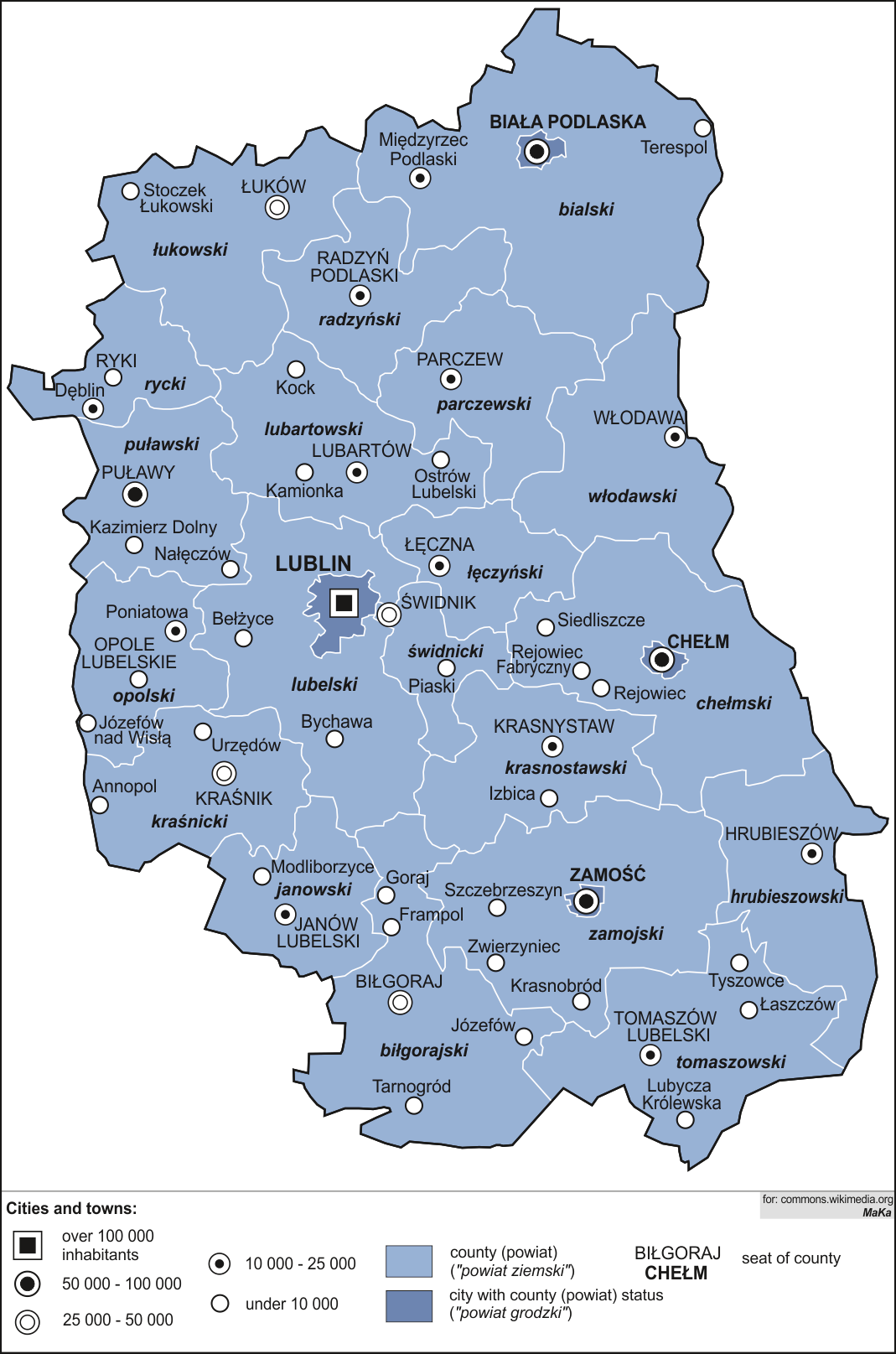
- Division into counties
- Coordinates (Lublin): 51°14′53″N 22°34′13″E
- Country: Poland
- Capital: Lublin
- Counties: 4 cities, 20 land counties *: Biała Podlaska; Chełm; Lublin; Zamość; Biała County; Biłgoraj County; Chełm County; Hrubieszów County; Janów County; Kraśnik County; Krasnystaw County; Łęczna County; Lubartów County; Lublin County; Łuków County; Opole County; Parczew County; Puławy County; Radzyń County; Ryki County; Świdnik County; Tomaszów County; Włodawa County; Zamość County

Government
  - Body: Lublin Voivodeship executive board
  - Voivode: Krzysztof Komorski (PO)
  - Marshal: Jarosław Stawiarski (PiS)
  - EP: Lublin

Area
  - Total: 25,155 km^{2} (9,712 sq mi)

Population (2024)
  - Total: 1,996,440
  - Density: 79.366/km^{2} (205.56/sq mi)
  - Urban: 922,698
  - Rural: 1,073,742

GDP
  - Total: €31.361 billion (2024)
  - Per capita: €16,334 (2024)
- Time zone: UTC+1 (CET)
  - Summer (DST): UTC+2 (CEST)
- ISO 3166 code: PL-06
- Vehicle registration: L
- HDI (2019): 0.866 very high · 12th
- Primary airport: Lublin Airport
- Website: www.lubelskie.pl
- further divided into 213 gminas

Lublin Voivodeship (Polish: województwo lubelskie [vɔjɛˈvut͡stfɔ luˈbɛlskʲɛ]) is a voivodeship (province) of Poland, located in the southeastern part of the country, with its capital being the city of Lublin.

The region is named after its largest city and regional capital, Lublin, and its territory is made of four historical lands: the western and central part of the voivodeship, with Lublin itself, belongs to Lesser Poland, the eastern part of Lublin Area belongs to Cherven Cities/Red Ruthenia, and the northeast belongs to Polesie and Podlasie. Lublin Voivodeship borders Subcarpathian Voivodeship to the south, Świętokrzyskie Voivodeship to the south-west, Masovian Voivodeship to the west and north, Podlaskie Voivodeship along a short boundary to the north, Belarus (Brest Region) and Ukraine (Lviv and Volyn Regions) to the east. The region's population as of 2024 was 1,996,440. It covers an area of 25,155 square kilometres (9,712 sq mi).

== History ==
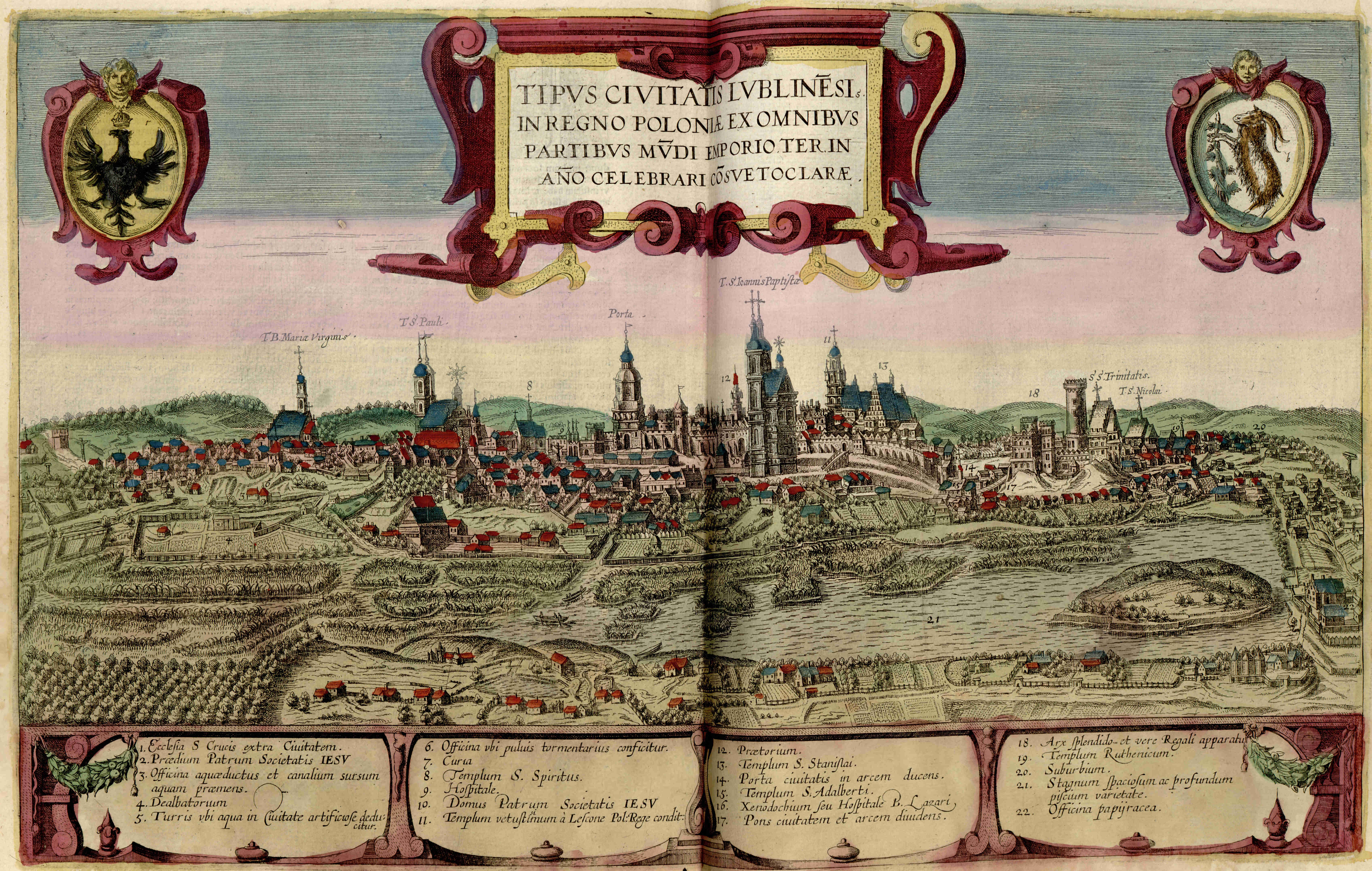
Lublin in the 17th century

The Polish historical region that encompasses Lublin, and approximates Lublin Voivodeship as it was before the Partitions of Poland, is known as Lubelszczyzna. Provinces centred on Lublin have existed throughout much of Poland's history; for details see the section below on Previous Lublin Voivodeships. Cities and towns of greatest historic importance are Lublin, Chełm, Kazimierz Dolny and Zamość. Lublin hosted several sessions of the Polish Parliament, including the session which established the Polish–Lithuanian Commonwealth (see Union of Lublin), and was the seat of the Crown Tribunal for the Lesser Poland Province, the highest appeal court in the Kingdom of Poland. Parczew hosted a session of the Polish Parliament in 1564, which was decisive in Poland's continued adherence to Catholicism during the Protestant Reformation. Horodło was the place of signing of the Polish–Lithuanian Union of Horodło, predating the Union of Lublin. Hrubieszów hosted several Polish-Lithuanian congresses. Biała Podlaska, Lubartów, Puławy, Radzyń Podlaski and Zamość were residential towns of the prominent magnate families of Radziwiłł, Sanguszko, Czartoryski, Potocki and Zamoyski, respectively, with many more former noble residences located throughout the region. Tyszowce was the place of signing of the Tyszowce Confederation.

In the 17th century, there were sizeable Scottish communities in Lublin and Zamość, and also a smaller one in Opole Lubelskie. Lublin and Zamość also hosted Armenian minorities.

The industry of the region was greatly expanded as part of the Central Industrial Region of Poland.

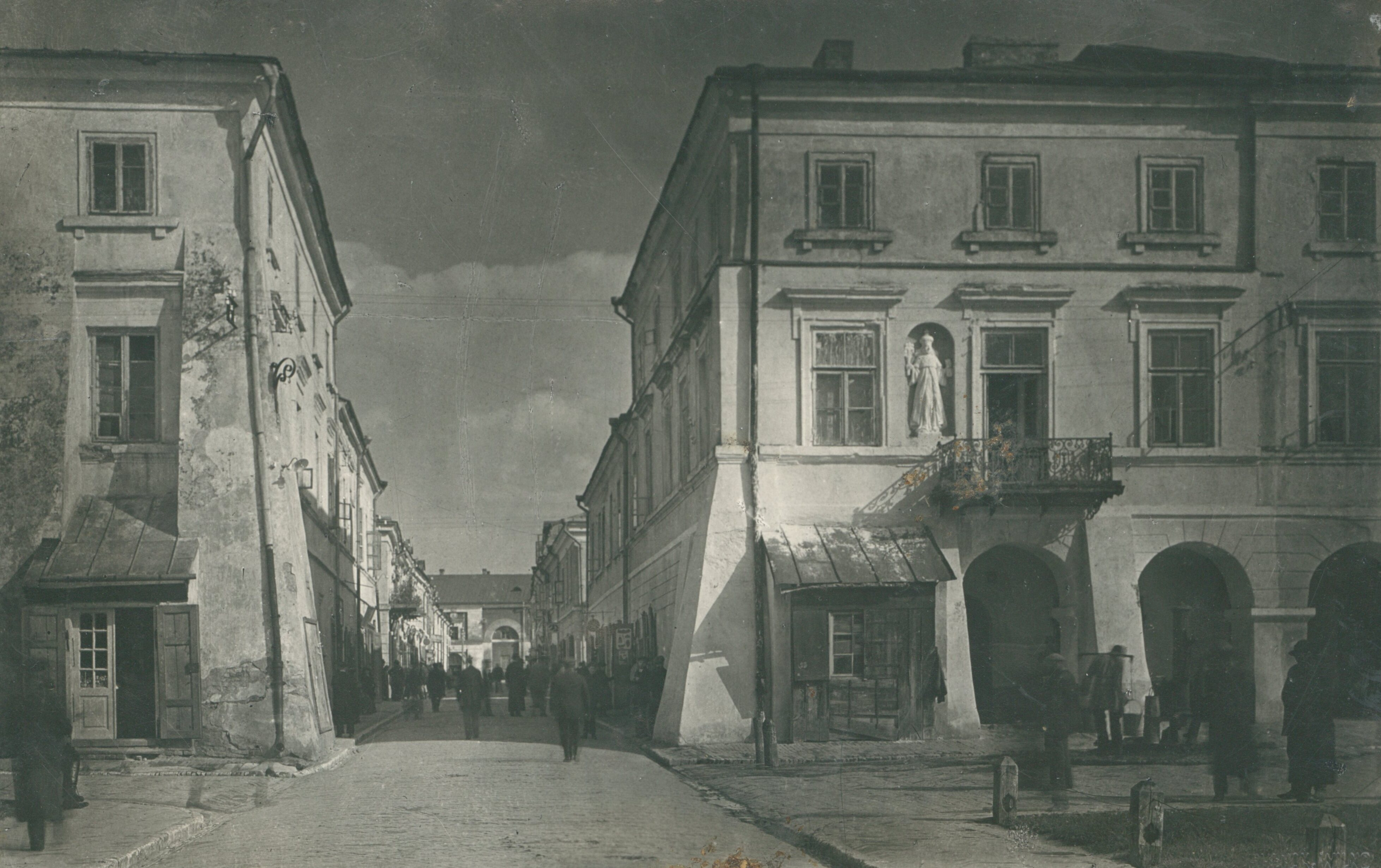
Zamość in the 1930s

The region was, before World War II, one of the world's leading centres of Judaism. Before the middle of the 16th century, there were few Jews in the area, concentrated in Lublin, Kazimierz Dolny, and perhaps Chełm; but the founding of new private towns led to a large movement of Jews into the region to develop trade and services. Since these new towns competed with the existing towns for business, there followed a low-intensity, long-lasting feeling of resentment, with failed attempts to limit the Jewish immigration. The Jews tended to settle mostly in the cities and towns, with only individual families setting up businesses in the rural regions; this urban/rural division became another factor feeding resentment of the newly arrived economic competitors. By the middle of the 18th century, Jews were a significant part of the population in Kraśnik, Lubartów and Łęczna.

By the 20th century, Jews represented greater than 70% of the population in eleven towns and close to 100% of the population of Łaszczów and Izbica. From this region came both religious figures such as Mordechai Josef Leiner of Izbica, Chaim Israel Morgenstern of Puławy, and Motele Rokeach of Biłgoraj, as well as famous secular author Israel Joshua Singer. Israel's brother, the Nobel prize winner Isaac Bashevis Singer, was not born in Biłgoraj but lived part of his life in the city. The "Old Town" of the city of Lublin contained a famous yeshiva, Jewish hospital, synagogue, cemetery, and kahal, as well as the Grodzka Gate (known as the Jewish Gate).

Before the war, there were 300,000 Jews living in the region, which became the site of the Majdanek concentration camp, Bełżec extermination camp and Sobibór extermination camp as well as several labour camps (Trawniki, Poniatowa, Budzyn, Puławy, Zamość, Biała Podlaska, and the Lublin work camps Lipowa 7 camp, Flugplatz, and Sportplatz) which produced military supplies for the Wehrmacht and Luftwaffe. This was once one of the biggest forced labour centres in German-occupied Europe, with approximately 45,000 Jewish prisoners. After the war, the few surviving Jews largely left the area; today there is some restoration of areas of Jewish historical interest, and a surge of tourism by Jews seeking to view their families' historical roots.

Polish people were also victims of German persecution and crimes, including the AB-Aktion, Aktion T4 and Operation Zamość with deportations to Nazi concentration camps, forced labour, kidnapping of children and massacres in the region. It witnessed the Polish Zamość uprising against German occupation. There were also German prisoner-of-war camps for Polish, French, Italian, Dutch, Belgian, Senegalese and Soviet prisoners of war in Chełm, Dęblin, Biała Podlaska, Zamość, Kaliłów with several forced labour subcamps, where many died from starvation, epidemics or were massacred.

Lublin Voivodeship was created on January 1, 1999, out of the former Lublin, Chełm, Zamość, Biała Podlaska and (partially) Tarnobrzeg and Siedlce Voivodeships, pursuant to Polish local government reforms adopted in 1998.

== Cities and towns ==
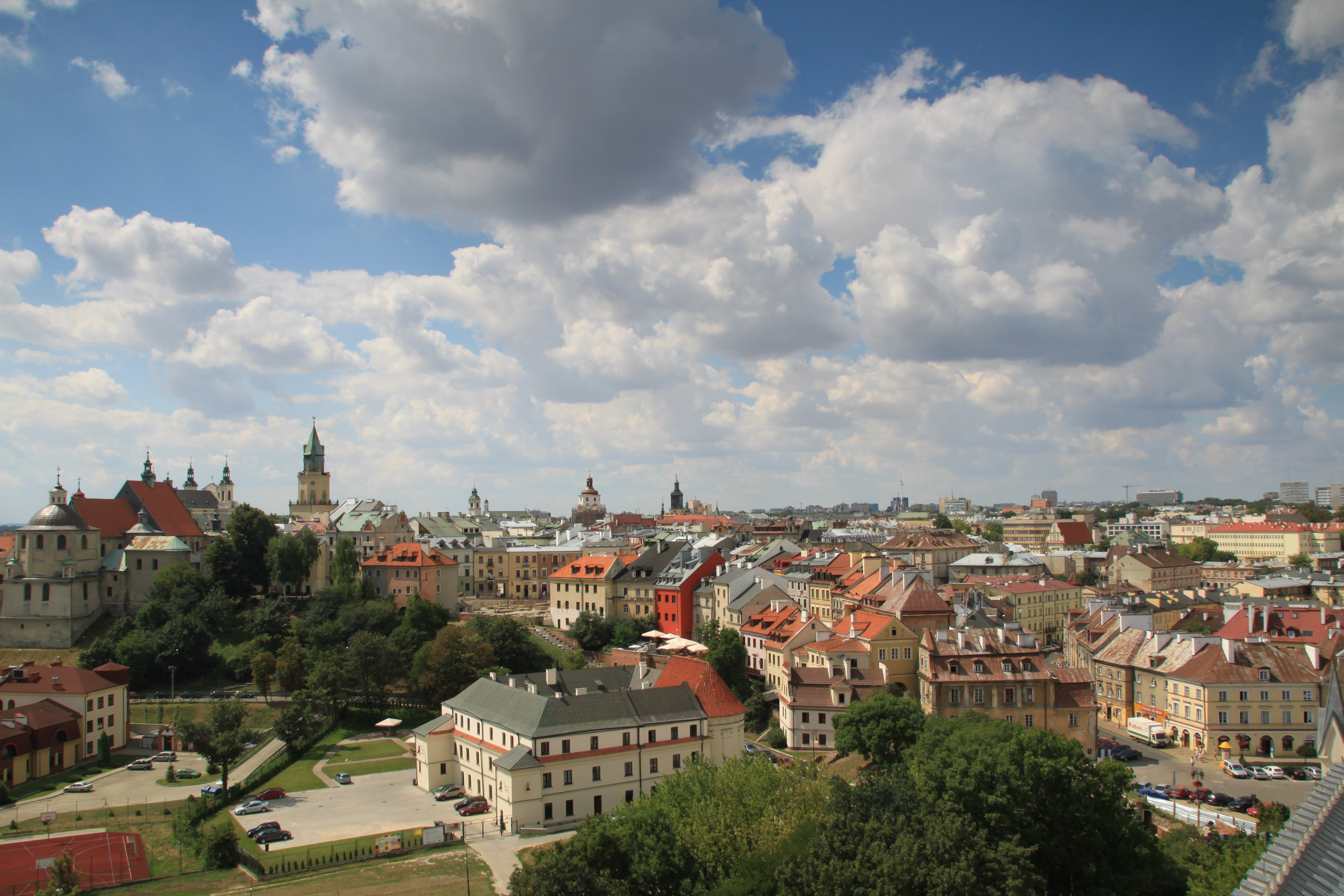
Historic centre of Lublin

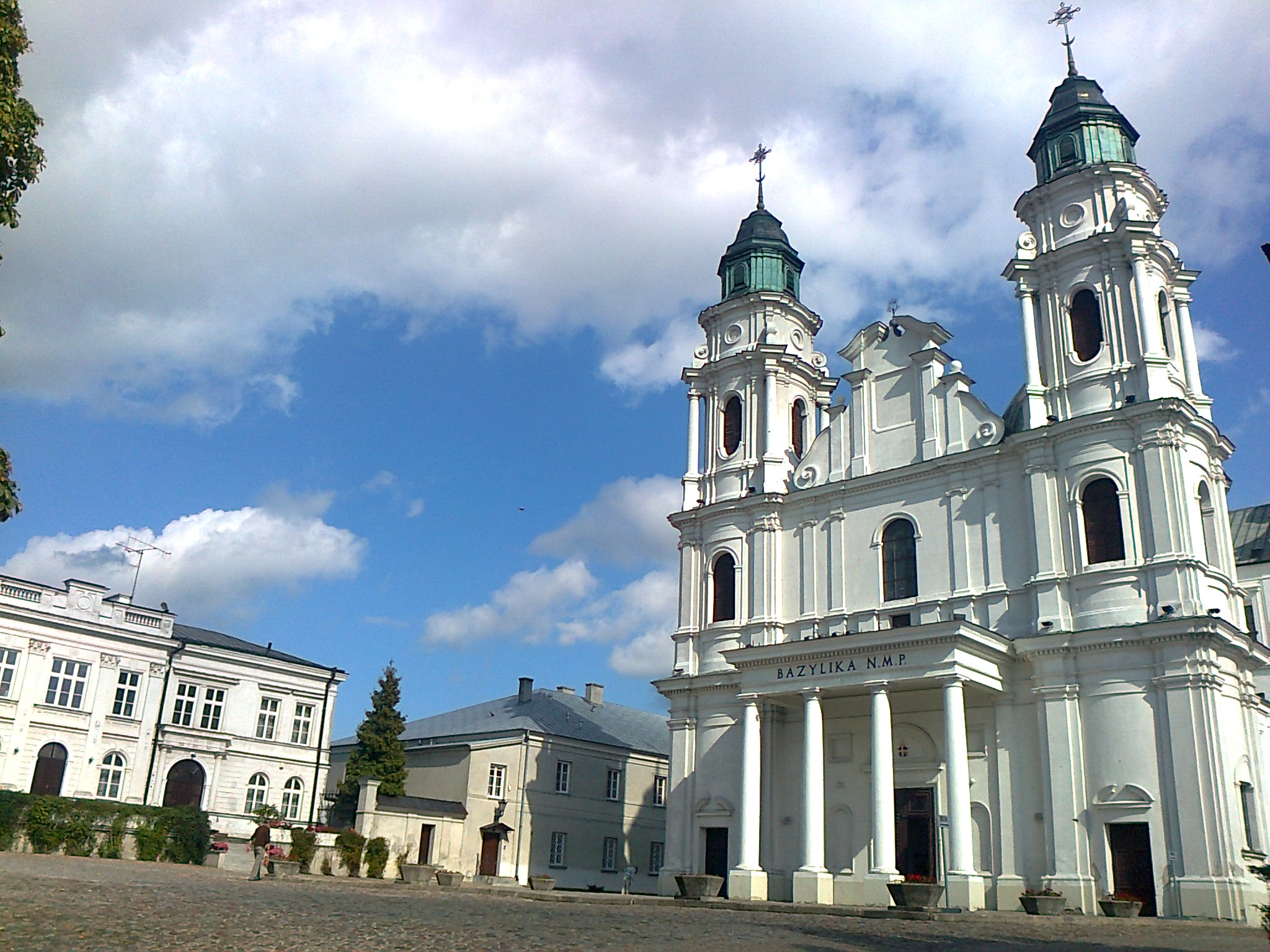
Basilica of the Birth of the Virgin Mary in Chełm

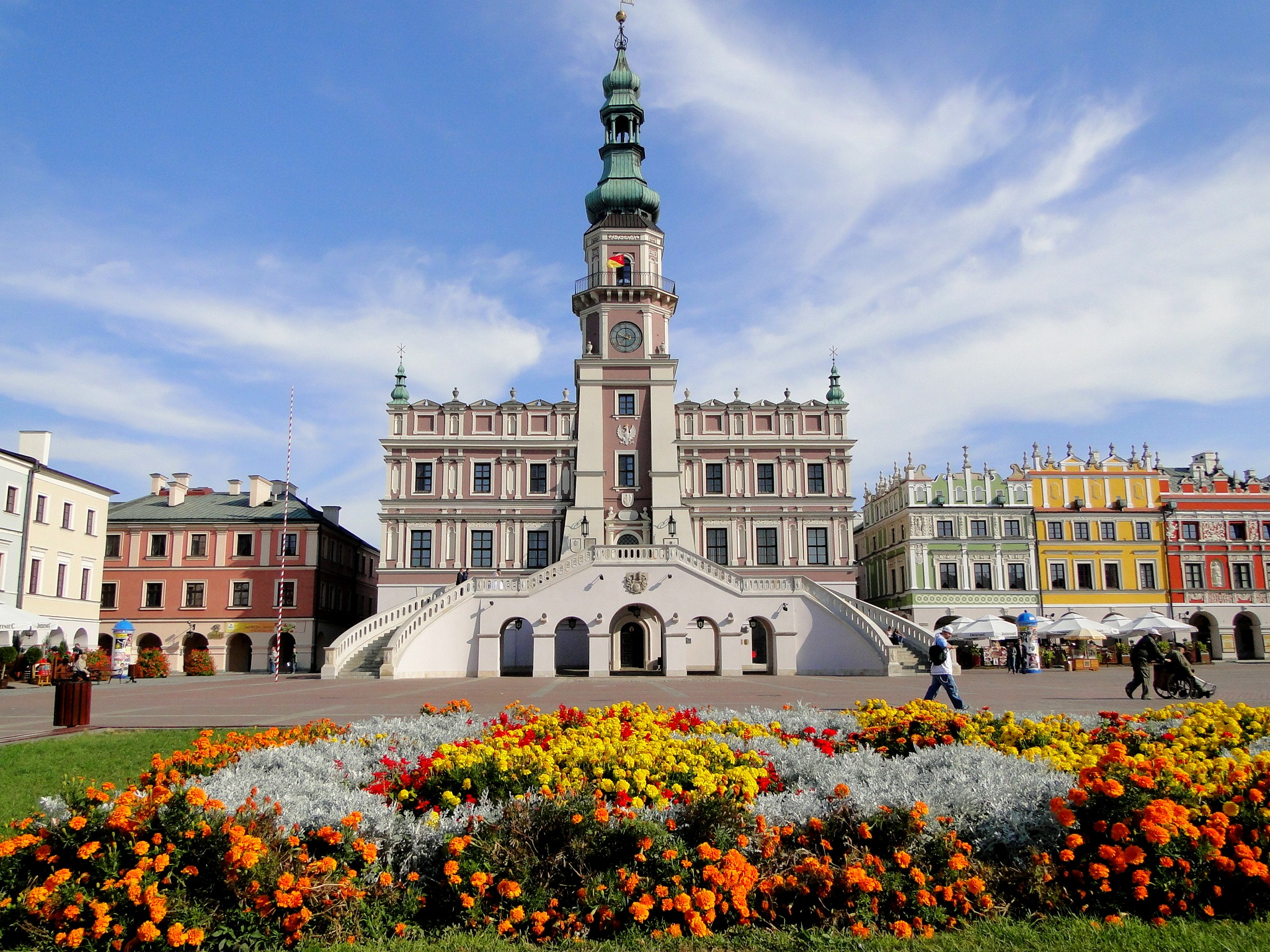
The Zamość Old Town is a UNESCO World Heritage Site

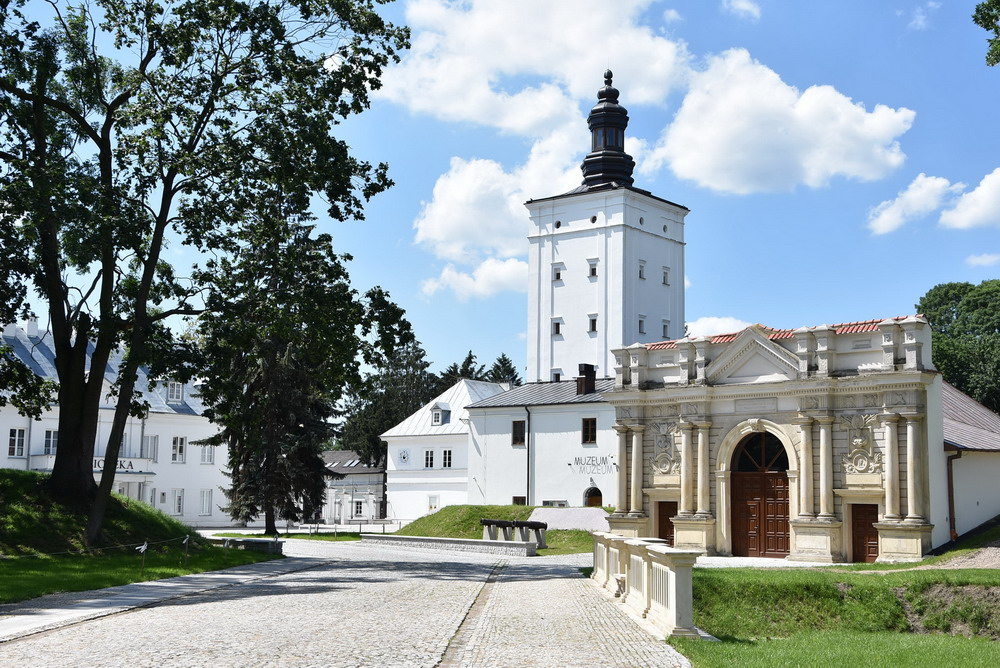
Radziwiłł Castle Complex in Biała Podlaska

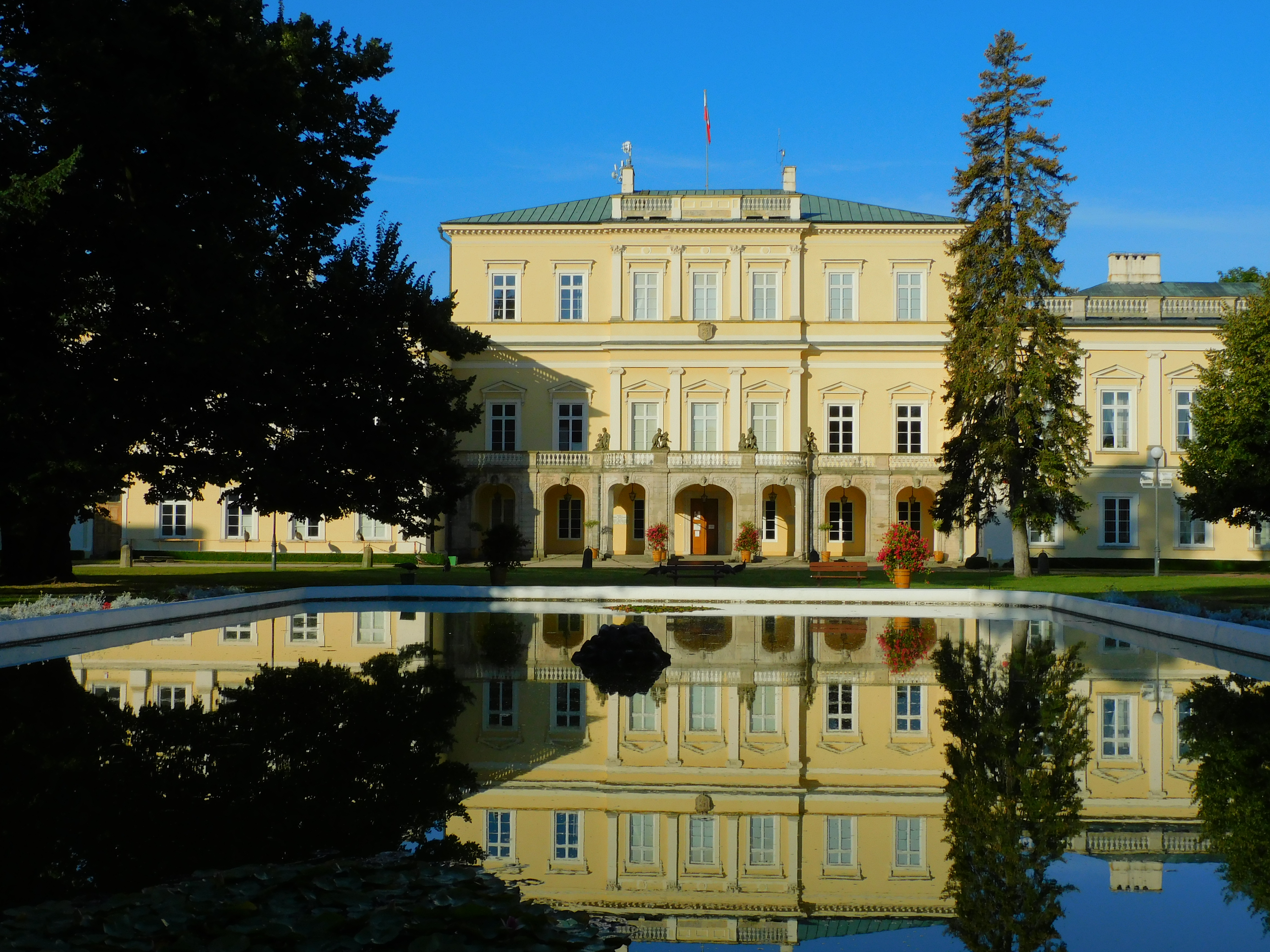
Czartoryski Palace in Puławy

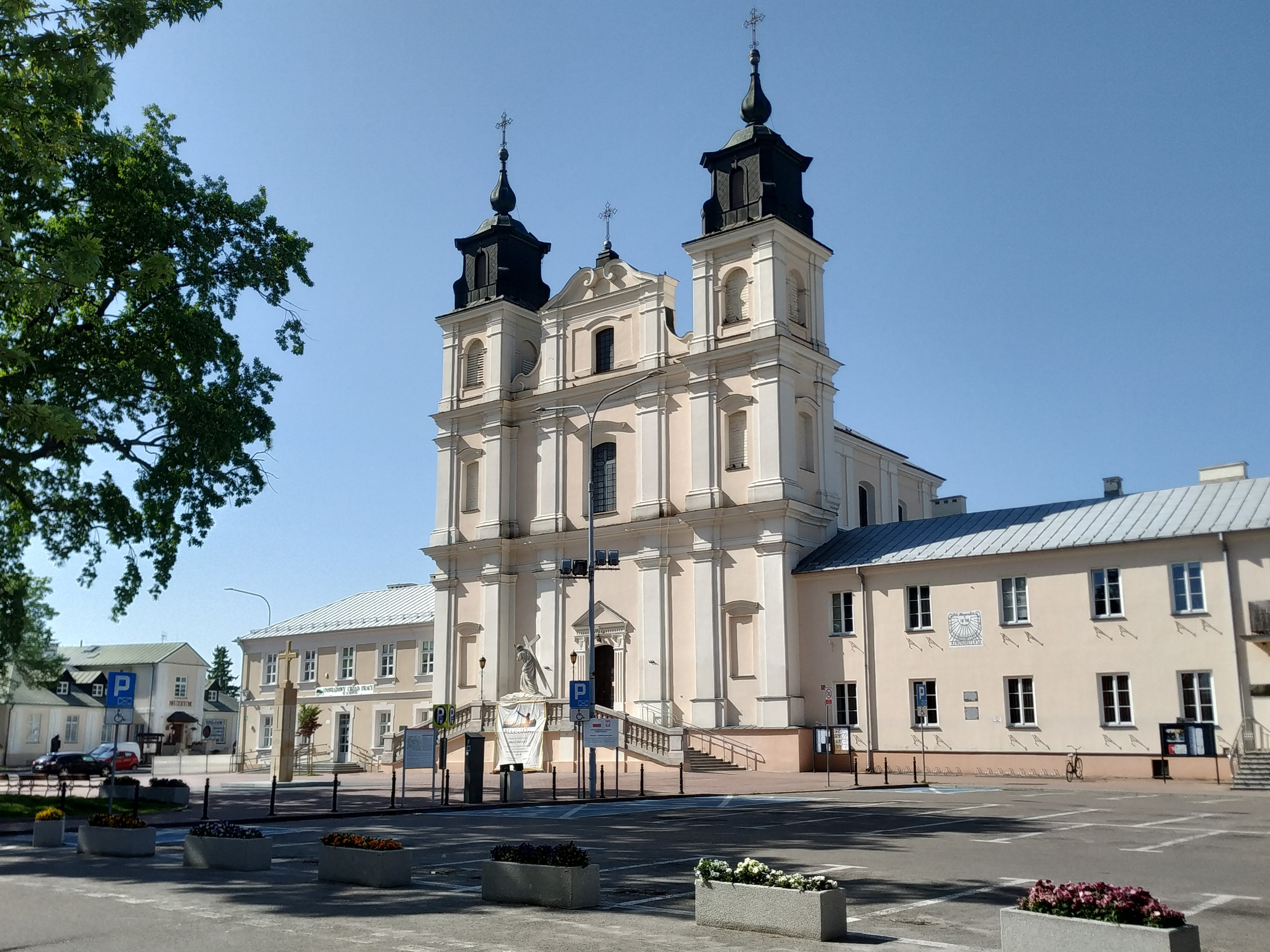
Collegiate Church of the Transfiguration of Jesus Christ in Łuków

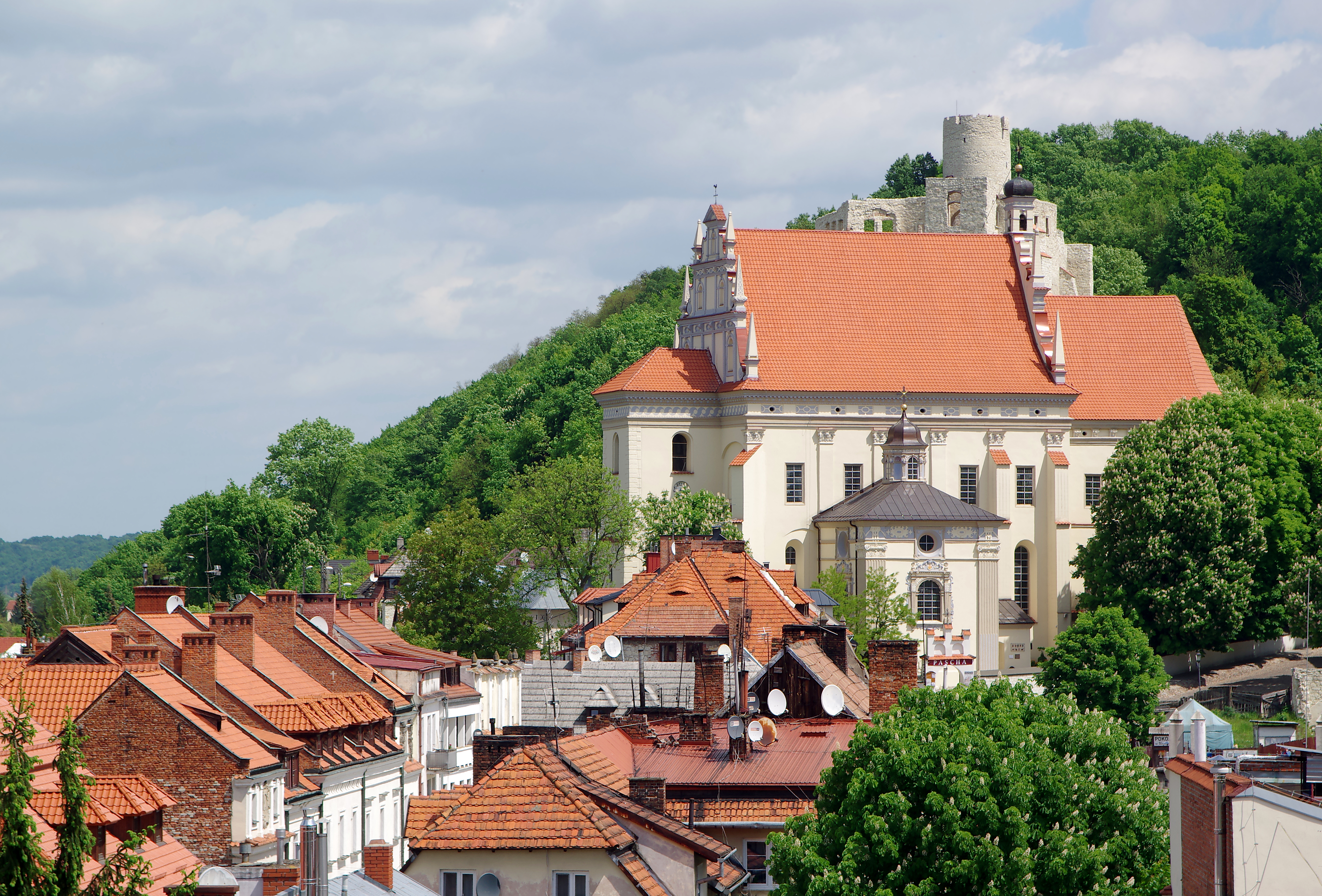
The town of Kazimierz Dolny is Poland's official national Historic Monument

The voivodeship contains 5 cities and 43 towns. These are listed below in descending order of population (according to official figures for 2019)

Cities (governed by a city mayor or prezydent miasta):
1. Lublin (339,770)
2. Zamość (63,511)
3. Chełm (62,331)
4. Biała Podlaska (57,264)
5. Puławy (47,634)

Towns:

1. Świdnik (39,217)
2. Kraśnik (34,355)
3. Łuków (29,885)
4. Biłgoraj (26,309)
5. Lubartów (21,948)
6. Tomaszów Lubelski (19,050)
7. Łęczna (18,884)
8. Krasnystaw (18,675)
9. Hrubieszów (17,634)
10. Międzyrzec Podlaski (16,736)
11. Dęblin (16,026)
12. Radzyń Podlaski (15,709)
13. Włodawa (13,167)
14. Janów Lubelski (11,901)
15. Parczew (10,602)
16. Ryki (9,625)
17. Poniatowa (9,144)
18. Opole Lubelskie (8,421)
19. Bełżyce (6,504)
20. Terespol (5,537)
21. Szczebrzeszyn (4,991)
22. Bychawa (4,893)
23. Rejowiec Fabryczny (4,406)
24. Nałęczów (3,749)
25. Tarnogród (3,333)
26. Kock (3,293)
27. Zwierzyniec (3,175)
28. Krasnobród (3,091)
29. Kazimierz Dolny (2,563)
30. Piaski (2,553)
31. Stoczek Łukowski (2,520)
32. Annopol (2,515)
33. Józefów (2,486)
34. Lubycza Królewska (2,447)
35. Łaszczów (2,139)
36. Tyszowce (2,112)
37. Ostrów Lubelski (2,078)
38. Rejowiec (2,066)
39. Urzędów (1,699)
40. Modliborzyce (1,462)
41. Frampol (1,428)
42. Siedliszcze (1,413)
43. Józefów nad Wisłą (915)
44. Piszczac
45. Izbica
46. Kamionka
47. Czemierniki
48. Goraj
49. Turobin
50. Końskowola
51. Kurów
52. Wąwolnica
53. Janów Podlaski

== Administrative divisions ==
Lublin Voivodeship is divided into 24 counties (powiats): 4 city counties and 20 land counties. These are further divided into 213 gminas.

The counties are listed in the following table (ordering within categories is by decreasing population).

English and Polish names	Area (km^{2})	Population (2019)	Seat	Other towns	Total gminas
City counties
Lublin	147	339,770			1
Zamość	30	63,511			1
Chełm	35	62,331			1
Biała Podlaska	49	57,264			1
Land counties
Lublin County powiat lubelski	1,679	154,760	Lublin *	Bełżyce, Bychawa	16
Puławy County powiat puławski	933	113,441	Puławy	Nałęczów, Kazimierz Dolny, Końskowola, Kurów, Wąwolnica	11
Biała County powiat bialski	2,754	111,078	Biała Podlaska *	Międzyrzec Podlaski, Terespol, Piszczac, Janów Podlaski	19
Zamość County powiat zamojski	1,872	106,526	Zamość *	Szczebrzeszyn, Zwierzyniec, Krasnobród	15
Łuków County powiat łukowski	1,394	107,144	Łuków	Stoczek Łukowski	11
Biłgoraj County powiat biłgorajski	1,678	101,152	Biłgoraj	Tarnogród, Józefów, Frampol, Goraj, Turobin	14
Kraśnik County powiat kraśnicki	1,005	95,618	Kraśnik	Annopol, Urzędów	10
Lubartów County powiat lubartowski	1,290	88,591	Lubartów	Kock, Ostrów Lubelski, Kamionka	13
Tomaszów County powiat tomaszowski (lubelski)	1,487	83,148	Tomaszów Lubelski	Tyszowce, Łaszczów, Lubycza Królewska	13
Chełm County powiat chełmski	1,780	78,074	Chełm *	Rejowiec Fabryczny, Rejowiec	15
Świdnik County powiat świdnicki (lubelski)	469	71,897	Świdnik	Piaski	5
Krasnystaw County powiat krasnostawski	1,067	63,554	Krasnystaw	Izbica	10
Hrubieszów County powiat hrubieszowski	1,269	63,320	Hrubieszów		8
Opole County powiat opolski (lubelski)	804	59,511	Opole Lubelskie	Poniatowa, Józefów nad Wisłą	7
Radzyń County powiat radzyński	965	59,057	Radzyń Podlaski	Czemierniki	8
Ryki County powiat rycki	616	55,919	Ryki	Dęblin	6
Łęczna County powiat łęczyński	634	57,372	Łęczna		6
Janów County powiat janowski	875	45,845	Janów Lubelski	Modliborzyce	7
Włodawa County powiat włodawski	1,256	38,524	Włodawa	Siedliszcze	8
Parczew County powiat parczewski	953	34,809	Parczew		7
* seat not part of the county

== Protected areas ==
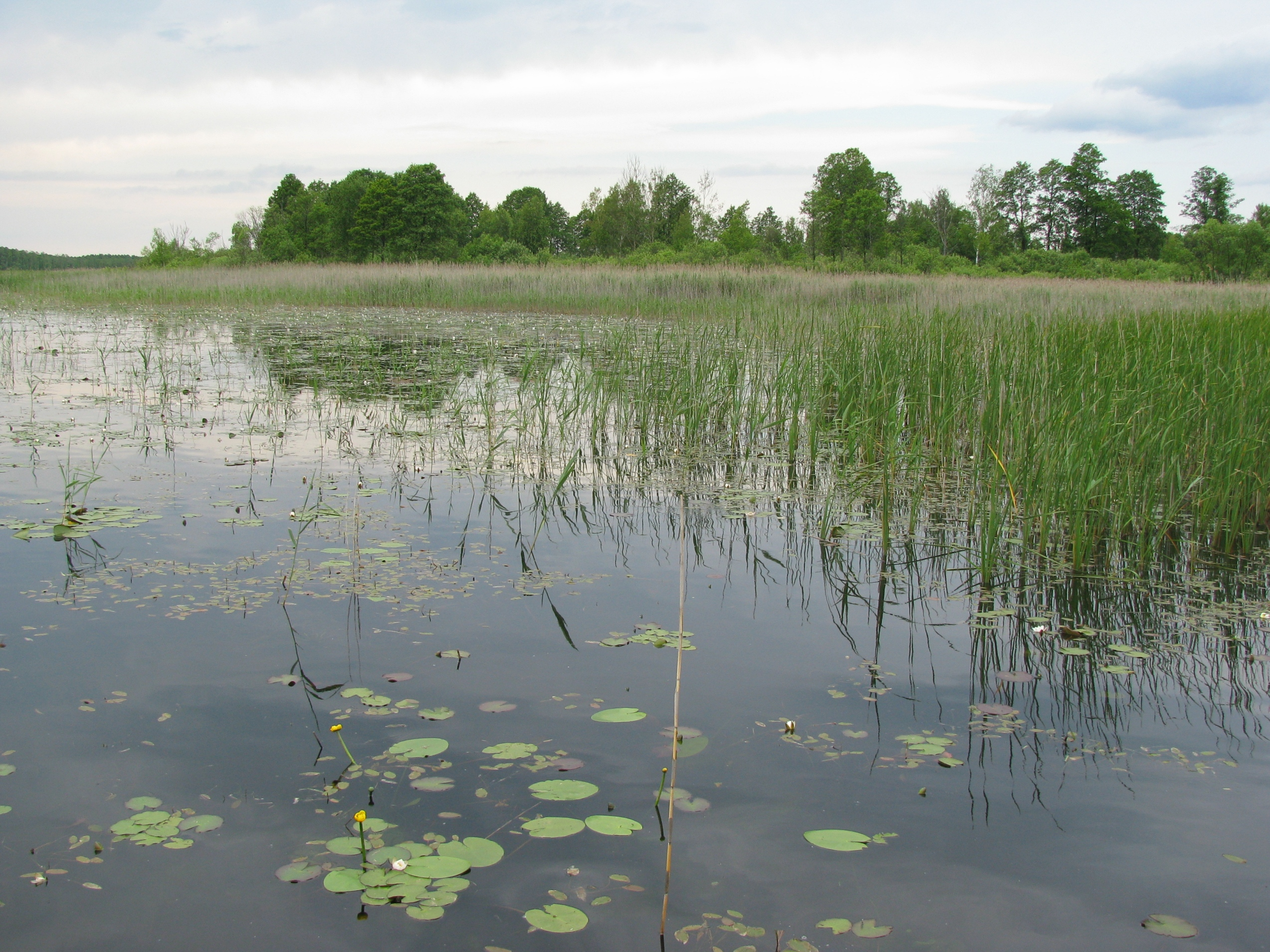
Łukie Lake in the Polesie National Park

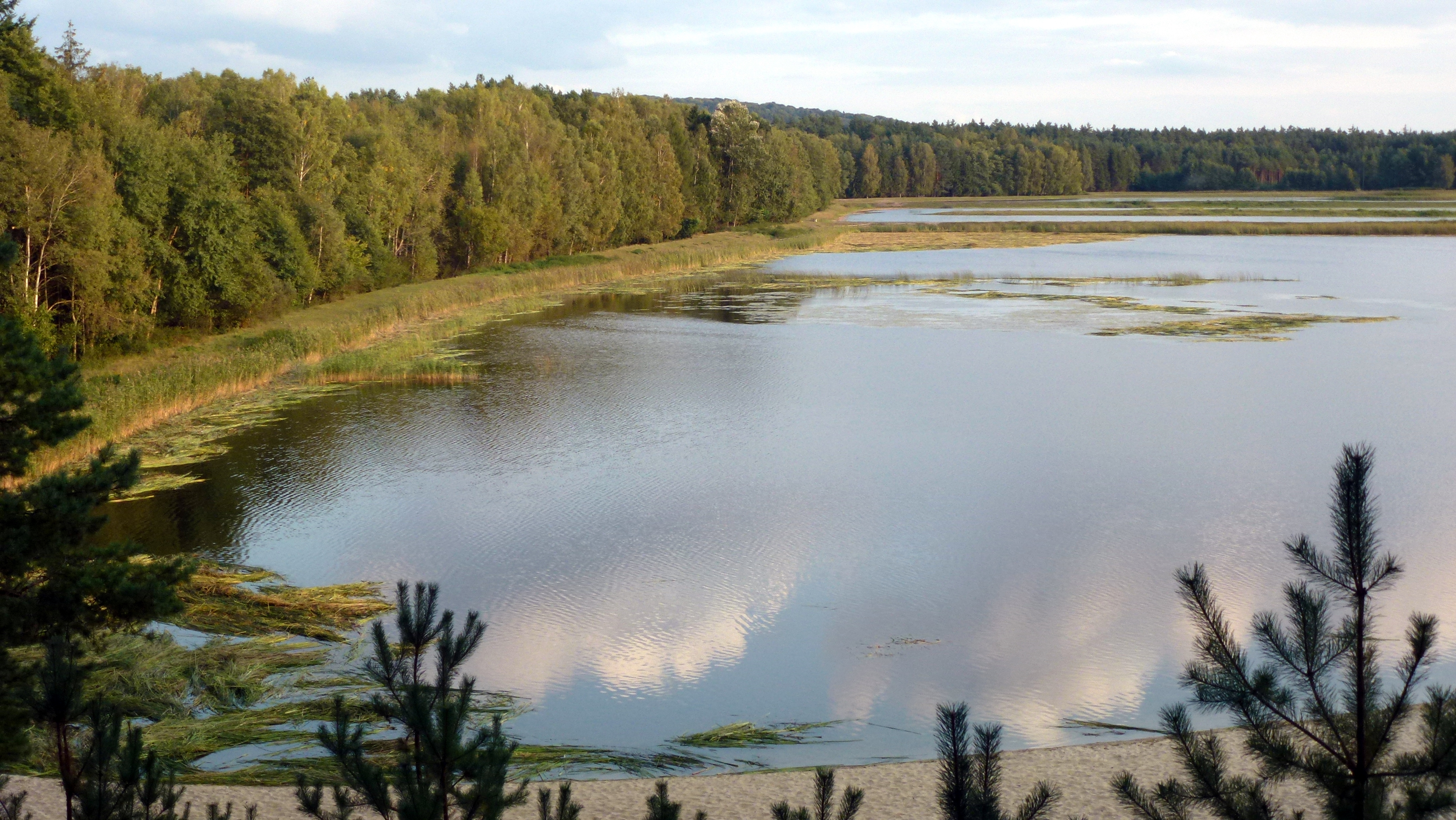
Echo artificial lake in the Roztocze National Park

Protected areas in Lublin Voivodeship include two National Parks and 17 Landscape Parks. These are listed below.

- Polesie National Park (this and surrounding areas form the West Polesie biosphere reserve designated by UNESCO in 2002)
- Roztocze National Park
- Chełm Landscape Park
- Janów Forests Landscape Park (partly in Subcarpathian Voivodeship)
- Kazimierz Landscape Park
- Kozłówka Landscape Park
- Krasnobród Landscape Park
- Krzczonów Landscape Park
- Łęczna Lake District Landscape Park
- Podlaskie Bug Gorge Landscape Park (partly in Masovian Voivodeship)
- Polesie Landscape Park
- Puszcza Solska Landscape Park (partly in Subcarpathian Voivodeship)
- Skierbieszów Landscape Park
- Sobibór Landscape Park
- South Roztocze Landscape Park (partly in Subcarpathian Voivodeship)
- Strzelce Landscape Park
- Szczebrzeszyn Landscape Park
- Wieprz Landscape Park
- Wrzelowiec Landscape Park

== Economy ==
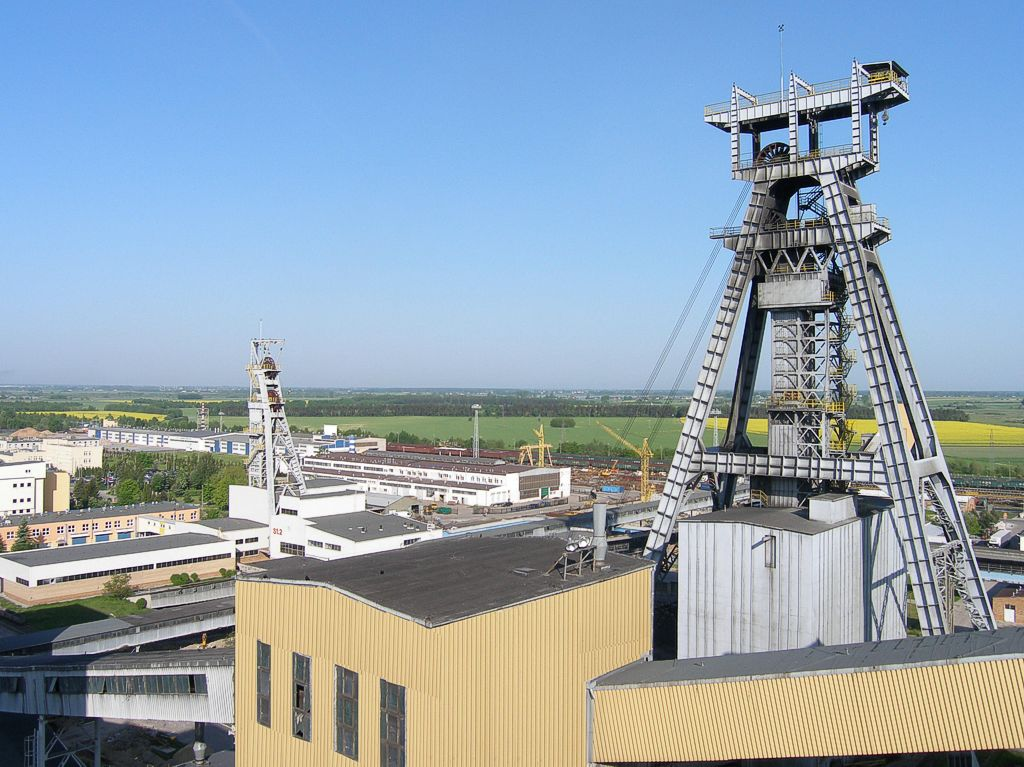
Bogdanka Coal Mine

The gross domestic product (GDP) of the province was 18.5 billion euros in 2018, accounting for 3.7% of Polish economic output. GDP per capita adjusted for purchasing power was 14,400 euros or 48% of the EU27 average in the same year. The GDP per employee was 54% of the EU average. Lublin Voivodship is the province with the lowest GDP per capita in Poland.

The Lublin Coal Basin is located in the voivodeship, centered at the Bogdanka Coal Mine in Bogdanka near Łęczna.

== Transportation ==
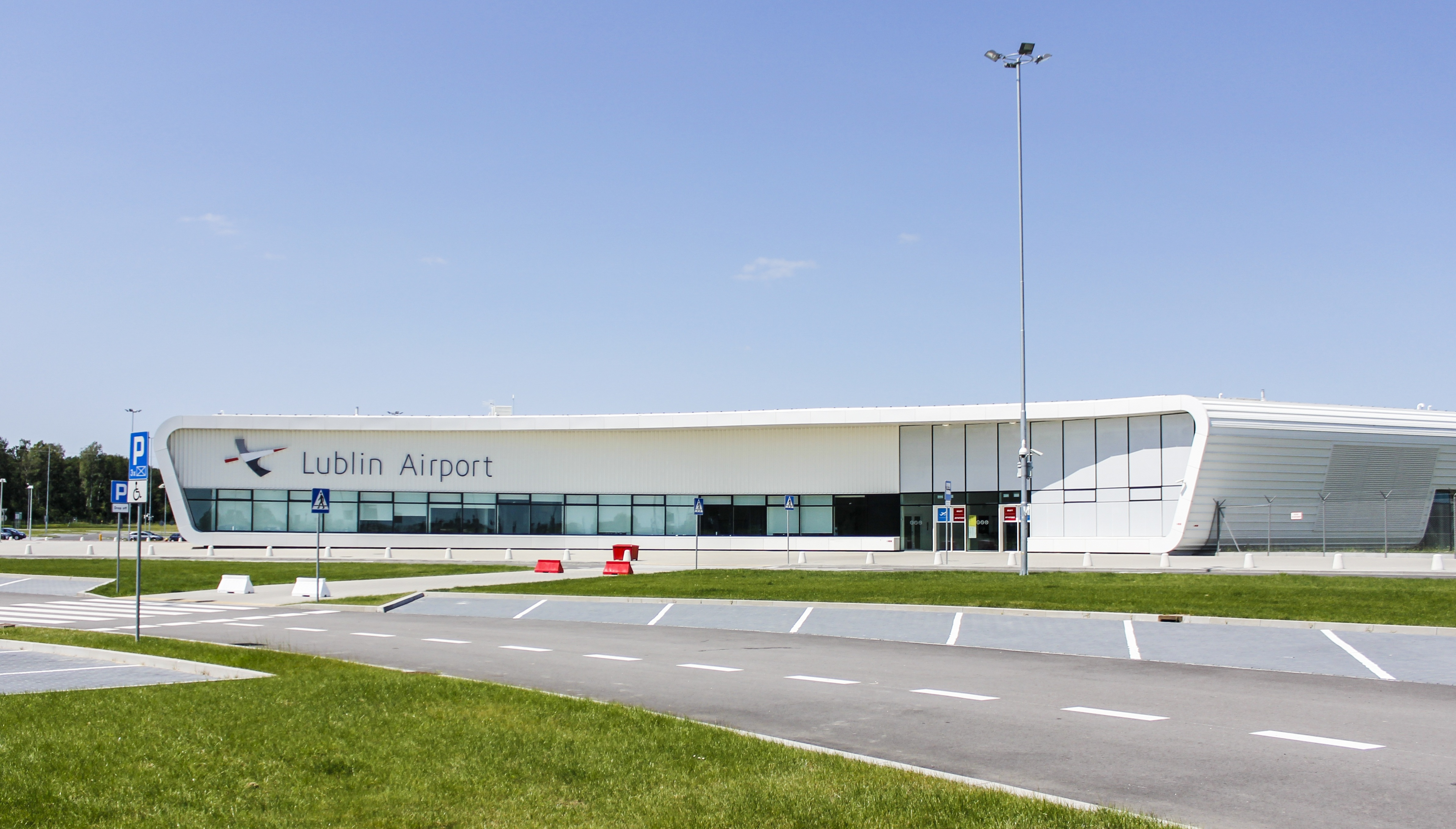
Lublin Airport

The Lublin Airport is the region's sole airport. The S12, S17 and S19 highways pass through the voivodeship.

== Sights and tourism ==
There are seven Historic Monuments of Poland and one World Heritage Site in the voivodeship:

- Zamość Old Town (listed as both)
- Kazimierz Dolny Old Town
- Lublin Old Town
- Kozłówka Palace
- Czartoryski Palace in Puławy
- Janów Podlaski Stud Farm
- St. Onuphrius Monastery in Jabłeczna

There are also many more castles and palaces in the region, including in Adampol, Biała Podlaska, Gardzienice Pierwsze, Gościeradów, Jabłoń, Janowiec, Kock, Lubartów, Łabunie, Łabuńki Pierwsze, Radzyń Podlaski, Srebrzyszcze. The Chapel of the Holy Trinity at the Lublin Royal Castle contains some of the oldest and best preserved medieval frescoes in Poland. The region is rich in architecture, especially churches, built in the regional Lublin Renaissance style, and there is a dedicated Lublin Renaissance Trail.

Nałęczów and Krasnobród are spa towns. Krasnystaw is famous for its annual Chmielaki beer festival. Chełm contains the Chełm Chalk Tunnels, a system of tunnels dug into the chalk under the city, a unique structure in Europe, whereas Lublin offers an underground tourist route in historic cellars under the Old Town Market Square.

There are several museums, including the National Museum in Lublin, the Polish Air Force Museum in Dęblin, and museums dedicated to popular Polish writers in the towns of their birth or their former homes, i.e. to Józef Ignacy Kraszewski in Romanów, to Henryk Sienkiewicz in Wola Okrzejska, to Bolesław Prus and Stefan Żeromski in Nałęczów and to Wincenty Pol in Lublin. The Majdanek State Museum and Sobibór Museum are museums located at the sites of the former Nazi German concentration camps at Majdanek and Sobibór. There are also numerous World War II memorials scattered across the voivodeship, including Holocaust memorials and memorials at the sites of German massacres of Poles, including the largest massacres in Rury, Lublin, Borów, Aleksandrów, Sochy, Smoligów, Jamy, Kumowa Dolina and Olszanka. The Great Synagogue of Włodawa, one of the best preserved historic synagogues in Poland, and one of the few not destroyed by Nazi Germany, houses a museum.

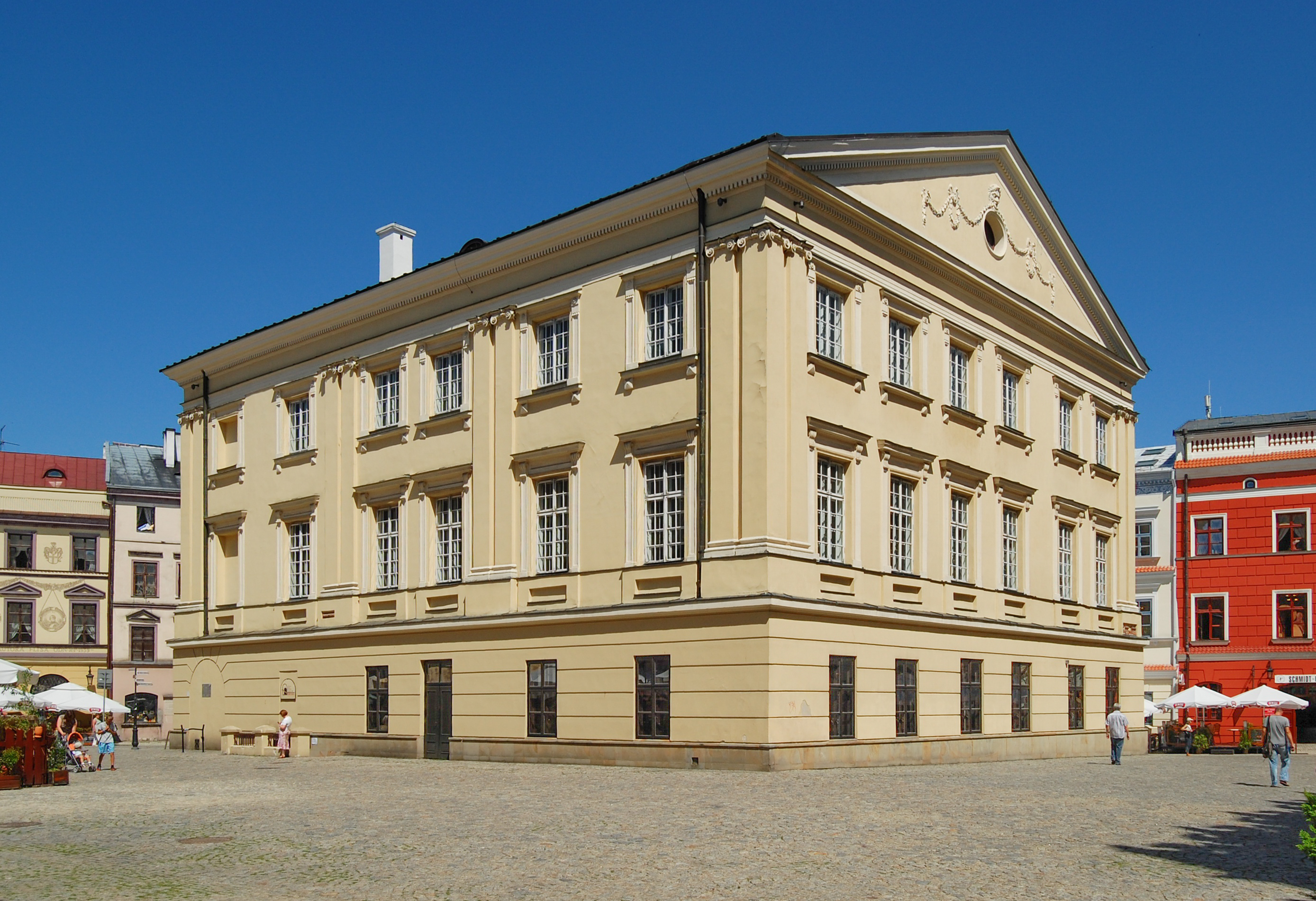
Former Crown Tribunal in the Lublin Old Town

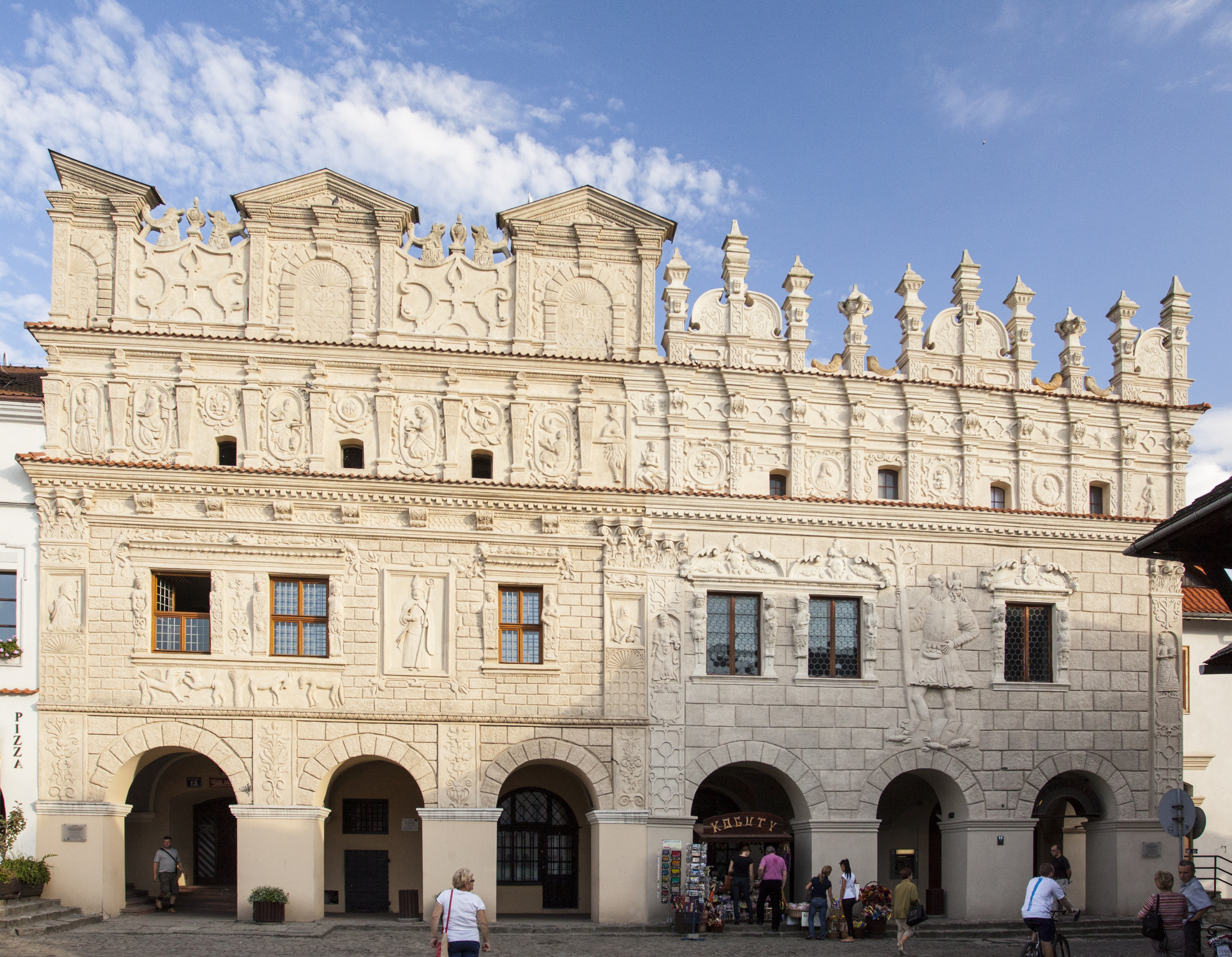
Mannerist tenements in Kazimierz Dolny

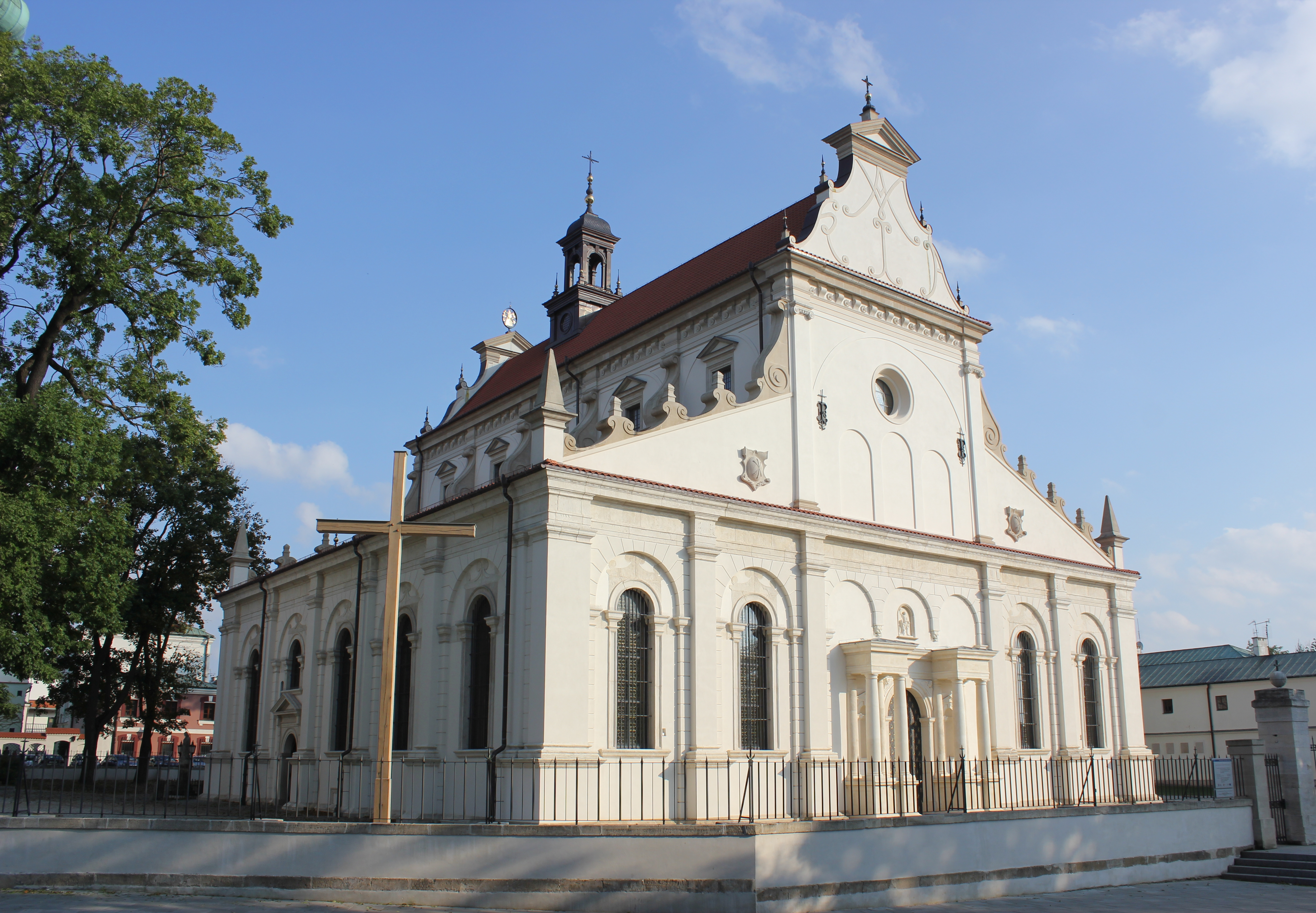
Zamość Cathedral

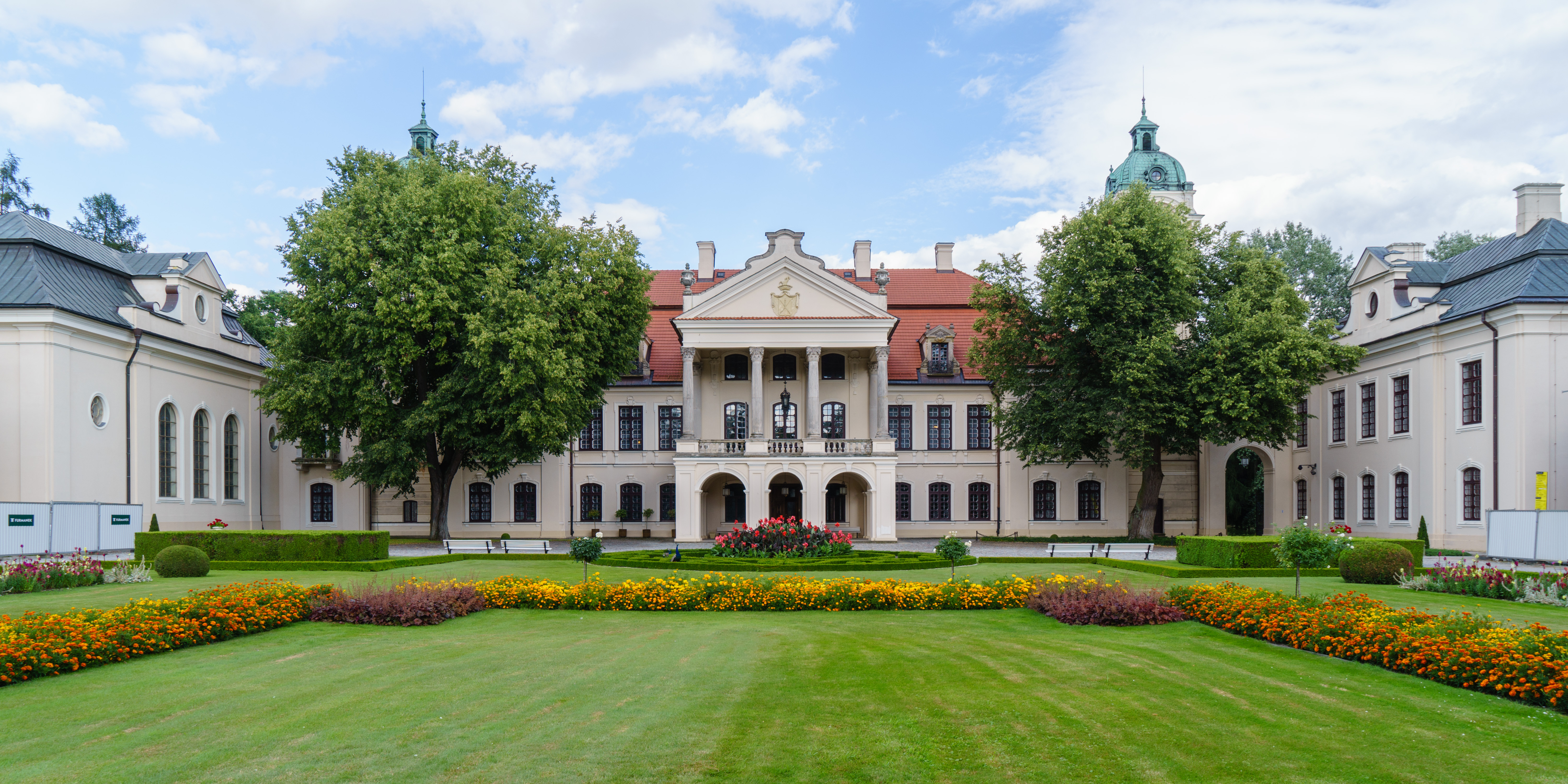
Kozłówka Palace

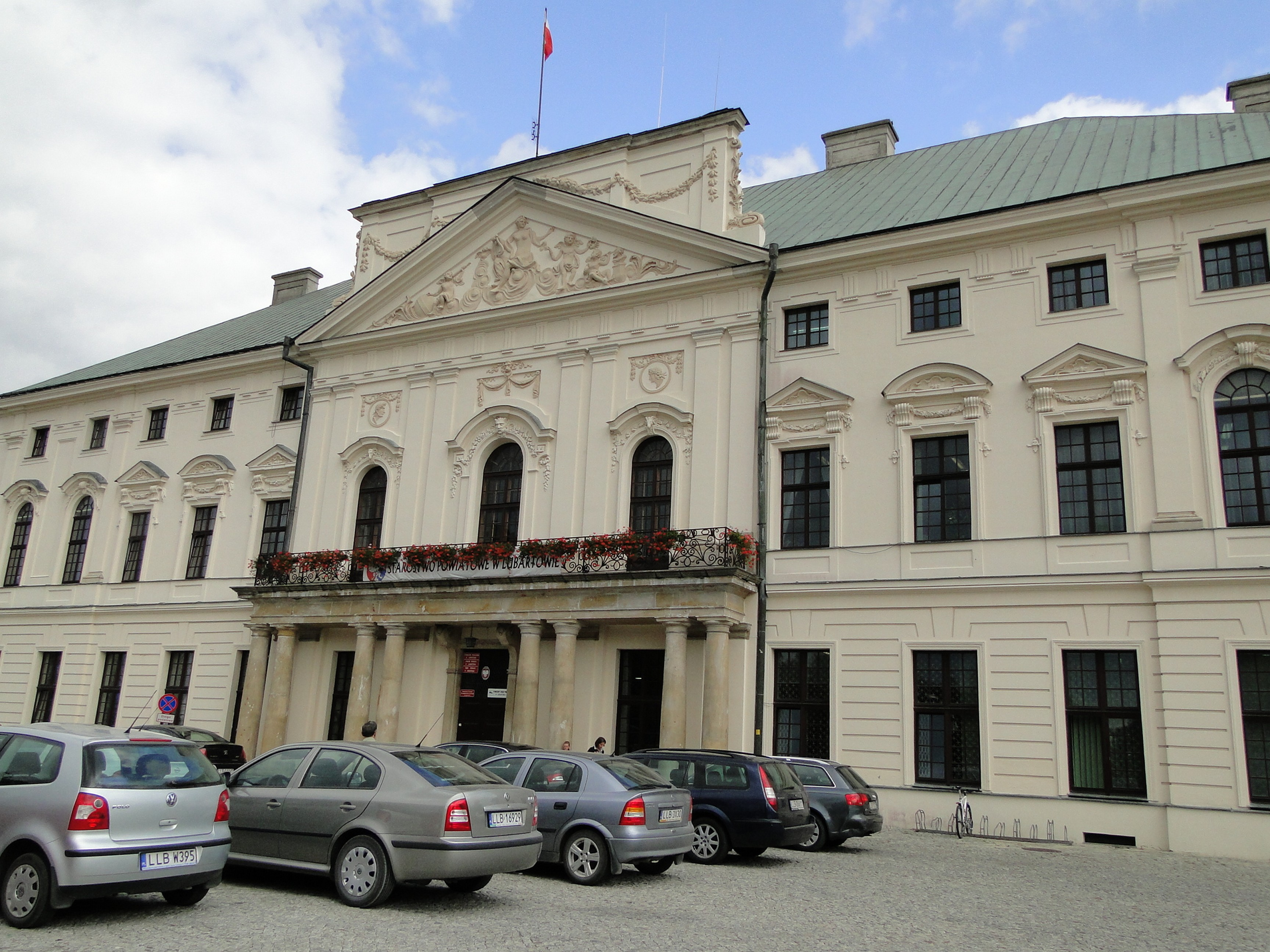
Lubartów Palace

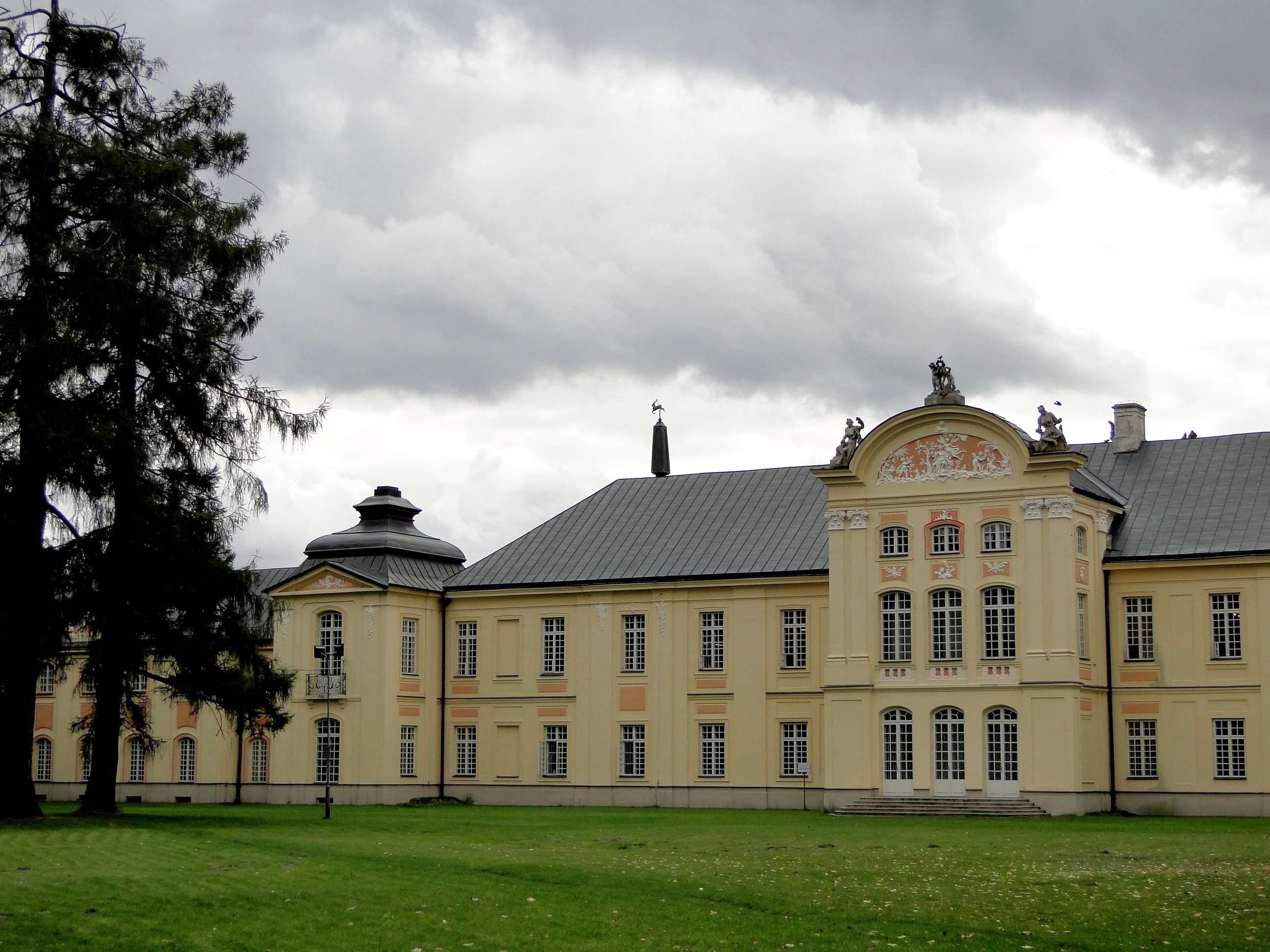
Radzyń Podlaski Palace

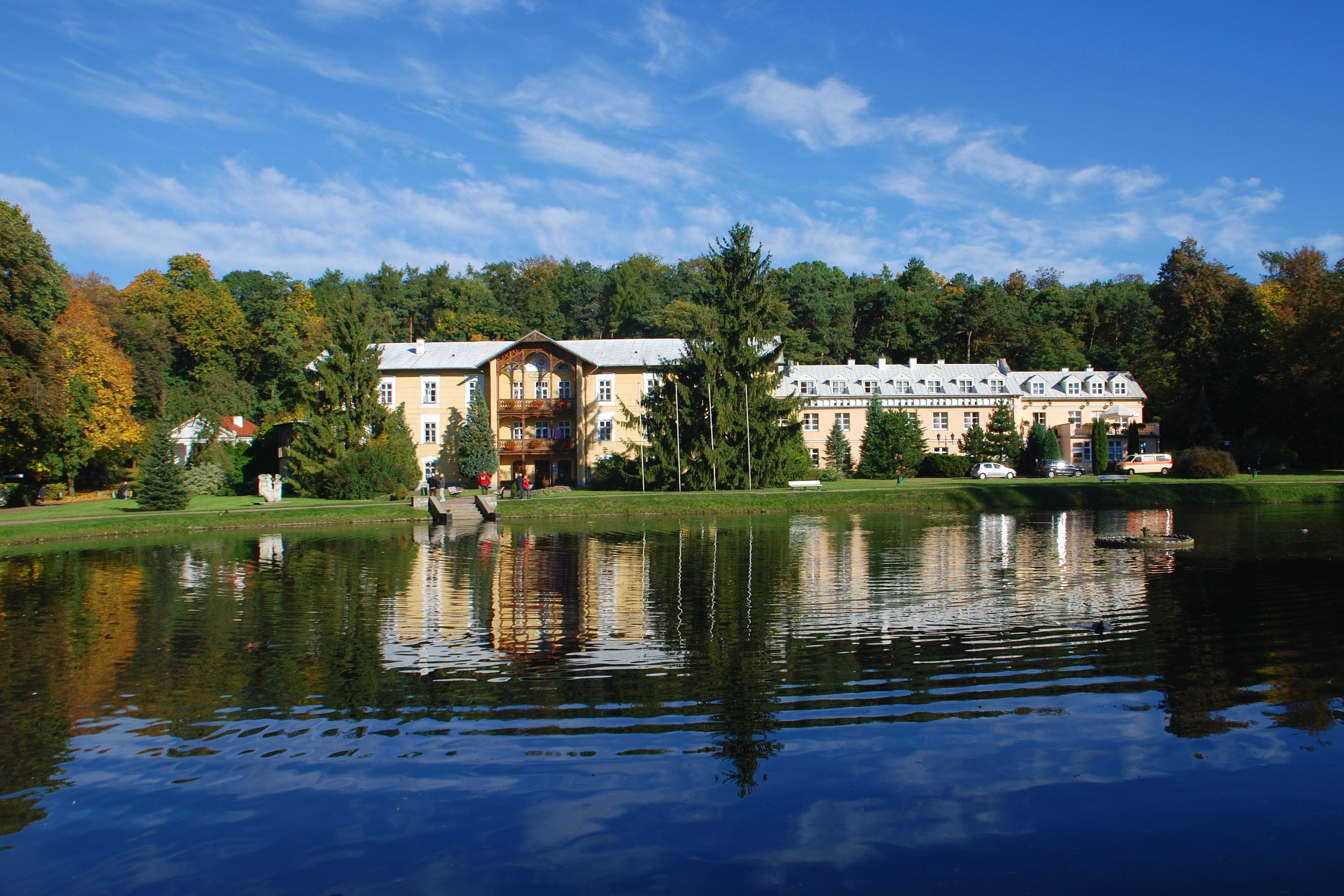
Sanatorium Książę Jóżef in Nałęczów

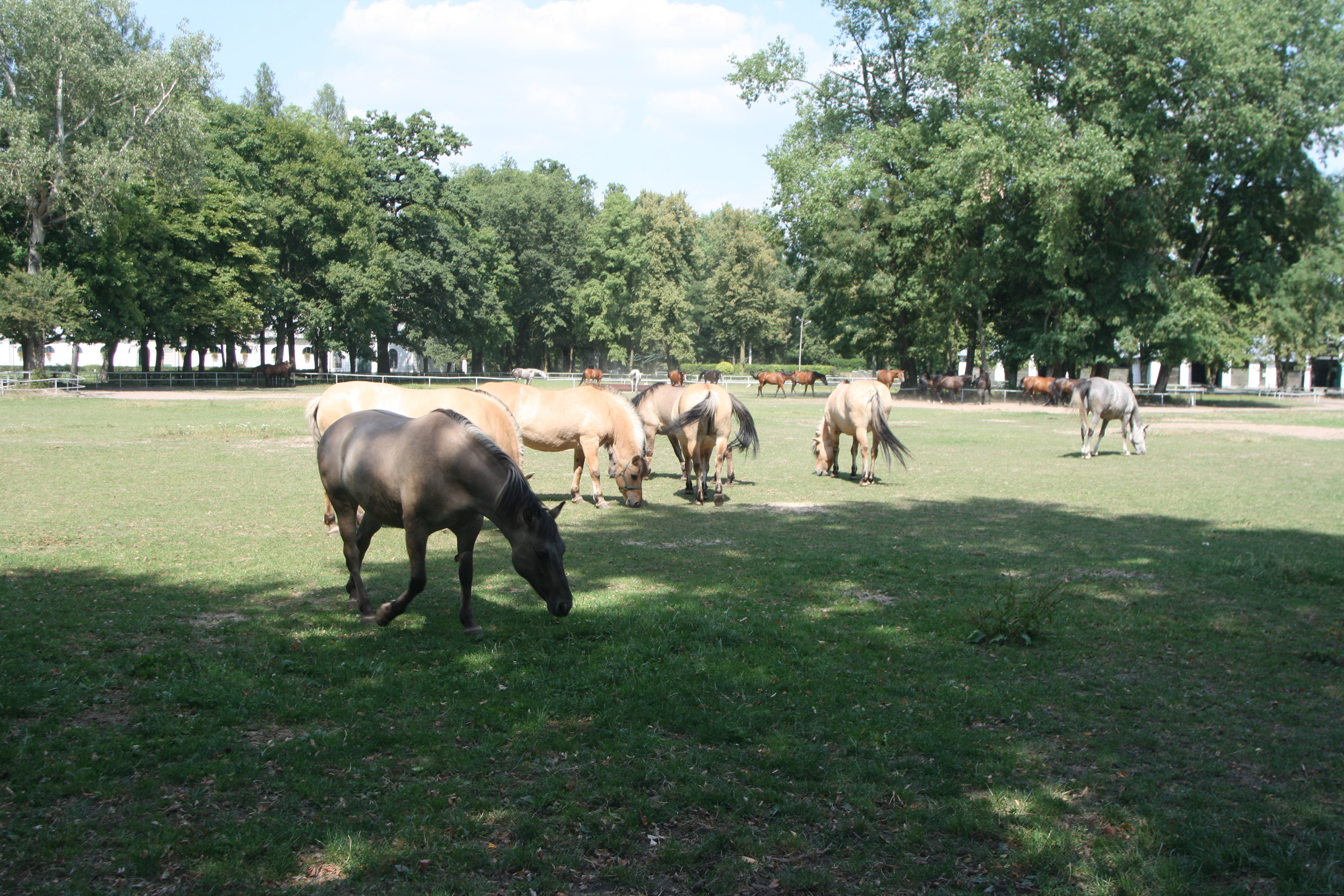
Janów Podlaski Stud Farm

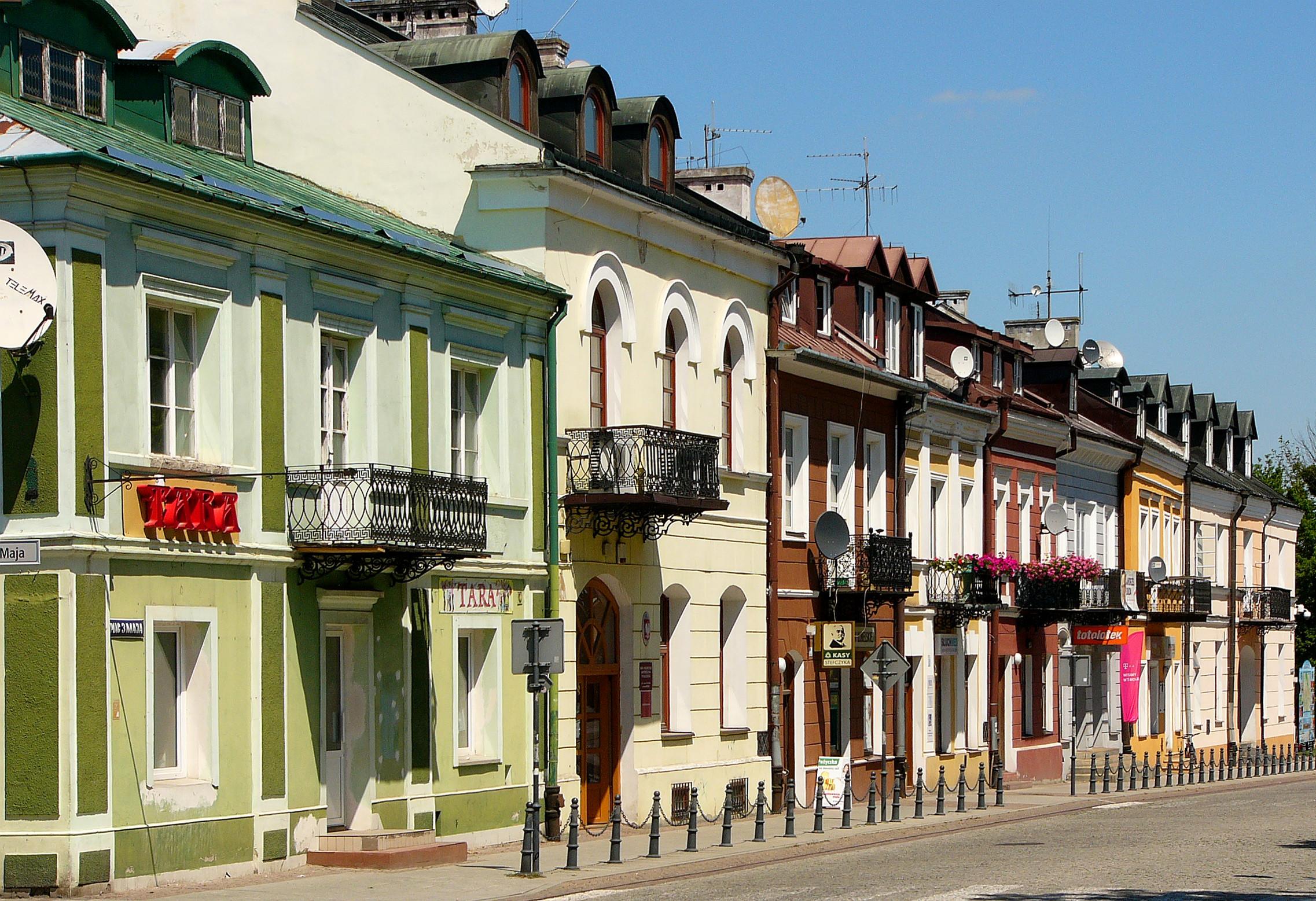
Old townhouses in Krasnystaw

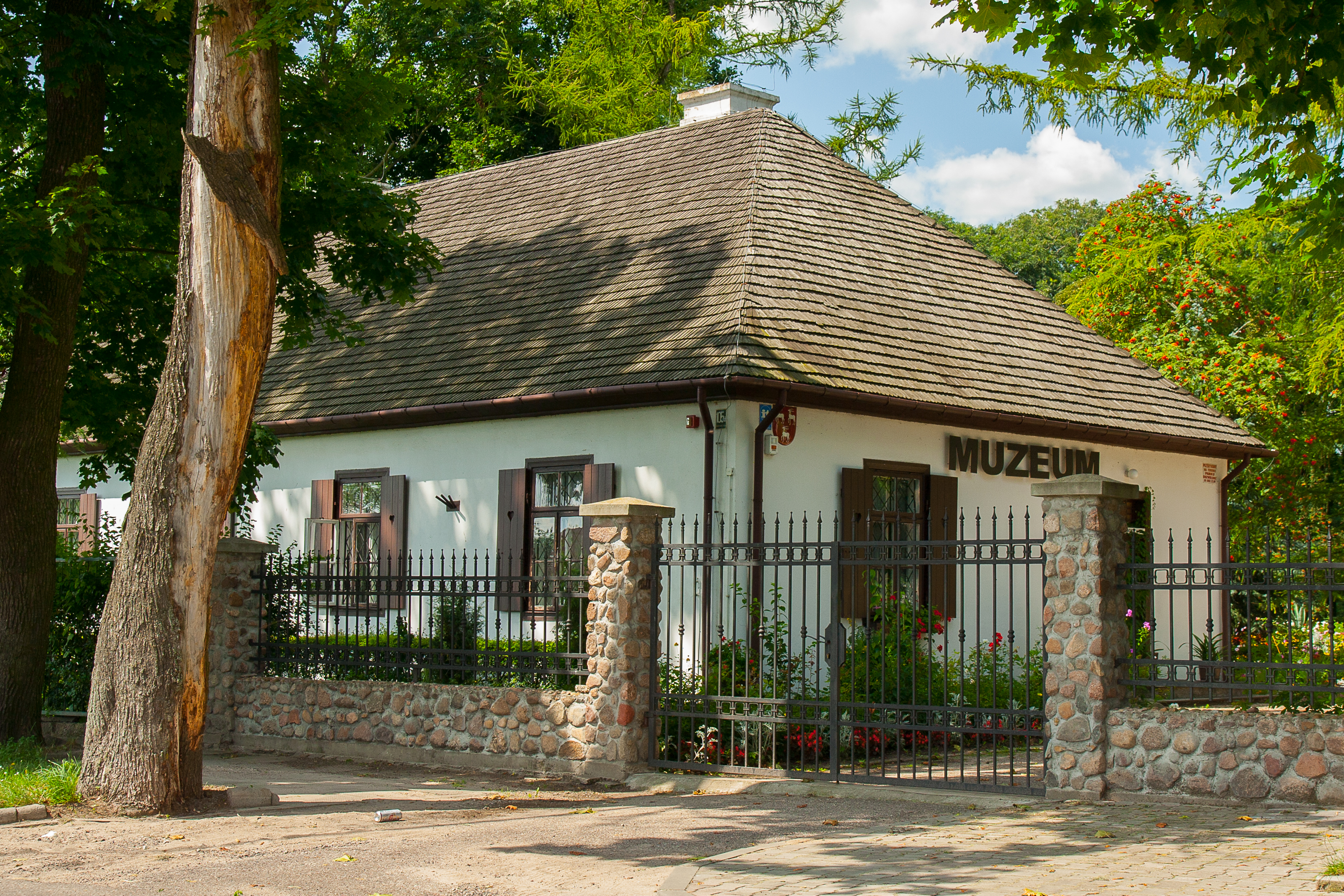
Henryk Sienkiewicz Museum in Wola Okrzejska

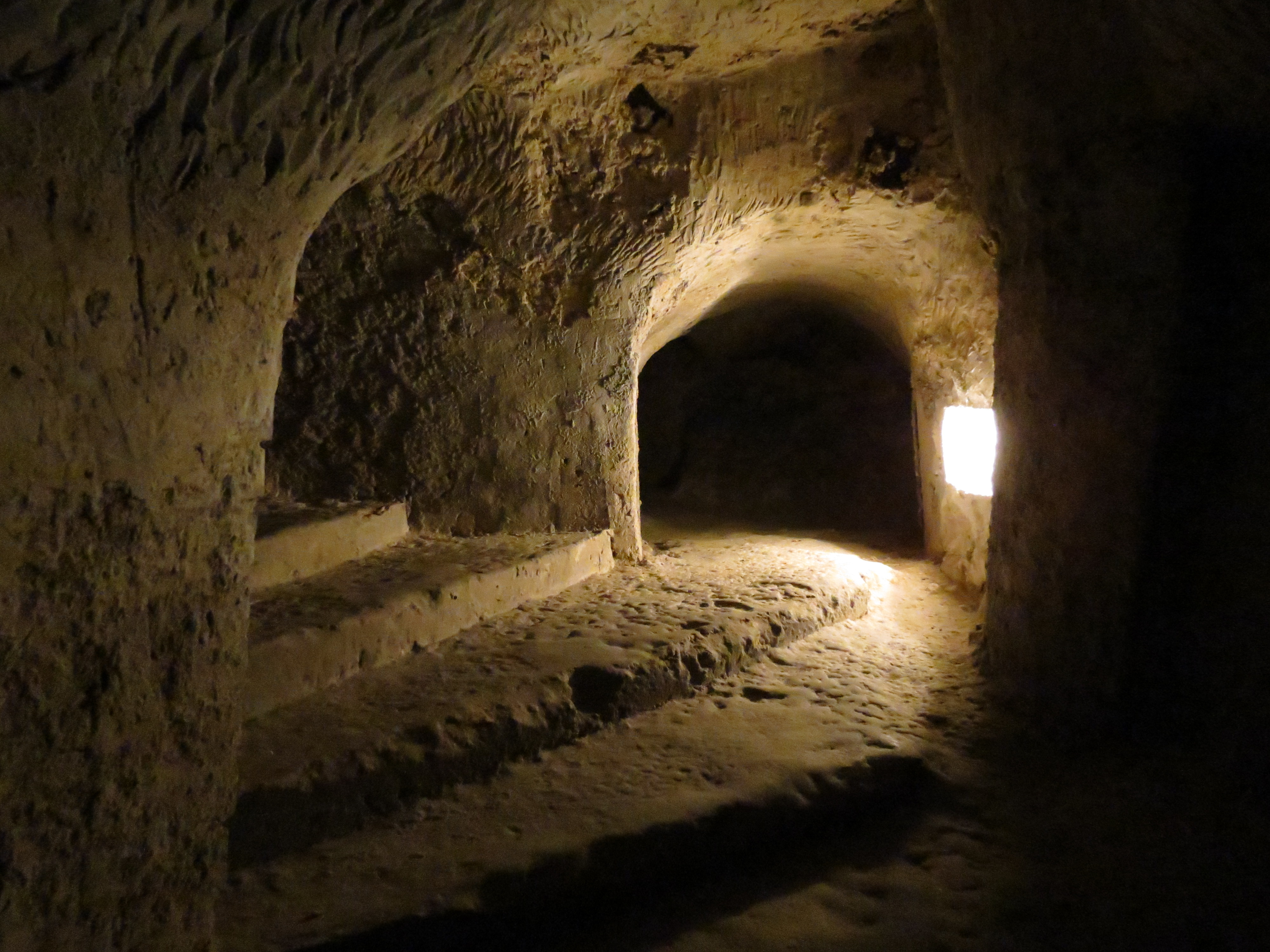
Chełm Chalk Tunnels

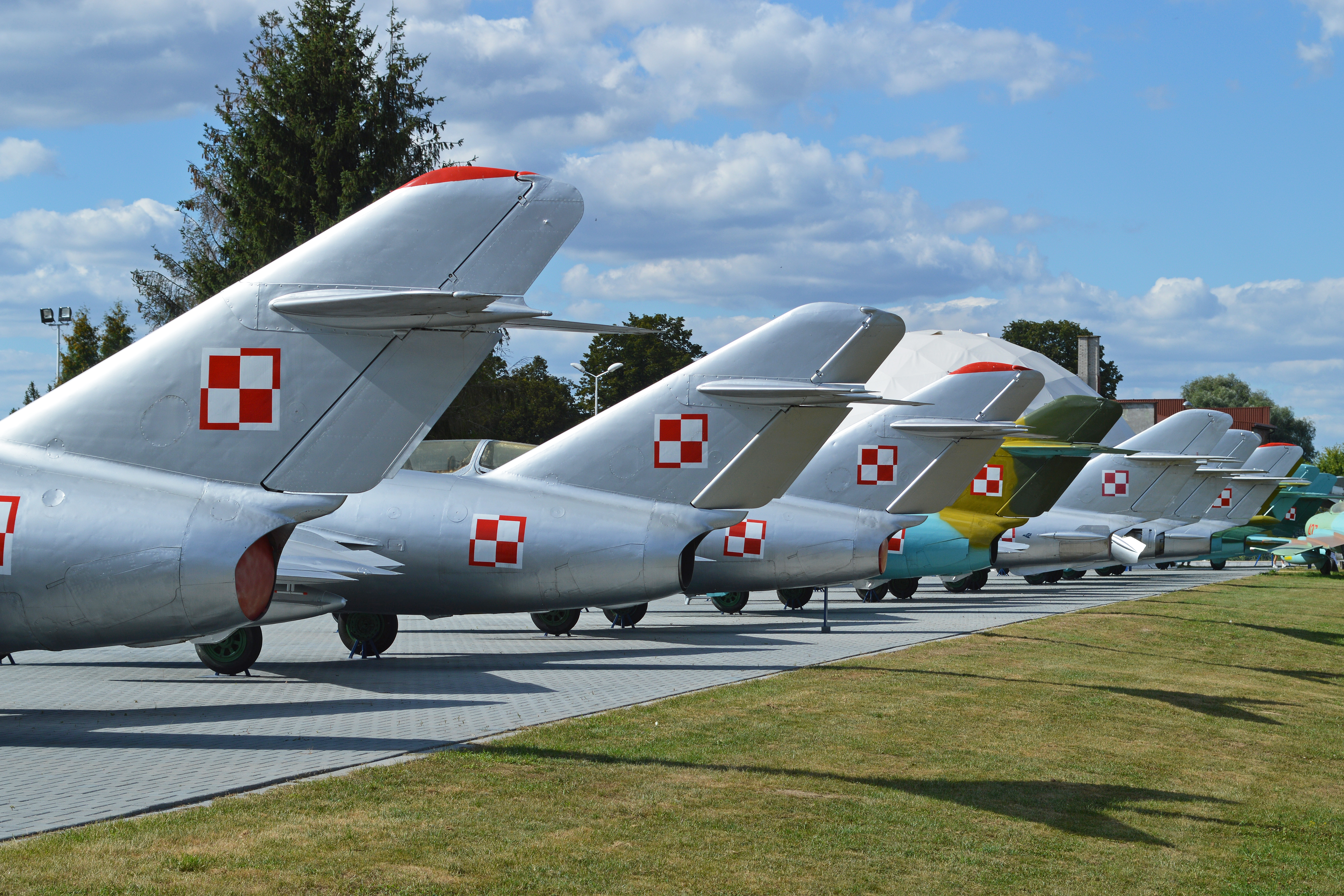
Polish Air Force Museum in Dęblin

== Cuisine ==
In addition to traditional nationwide Polish cuisine, Lublin Voivodeship is known for its variety of regional and local traditional foods and drinks, which include especially various honeys, meat products (incl. various types of kiełbasa, bacon and kaszanka), beverages and various dishes and meals, officially protected by the Ministry of Agriculture and Rural Development of Poland.

There are local types of pierogi, cakes, pastries (incl. pączki and poppy seed rolls) and racuchy. Local specialities include the meringue of Ostrów Lubelski, cake puffs of Lublin, and chocolate pralines of Lublin.

Traditional beverages include nalewki from Janów Lubelski, Kraśnik, Opole Lubelskie and Gmina Końskowola, mead, raspberry vodka from Kraśnik and cider from Mikołajówka. Traditional non-alcoholic drinks include various types of juices, tea, syrups, and hot chocolate from Lublin.

== Sports ==
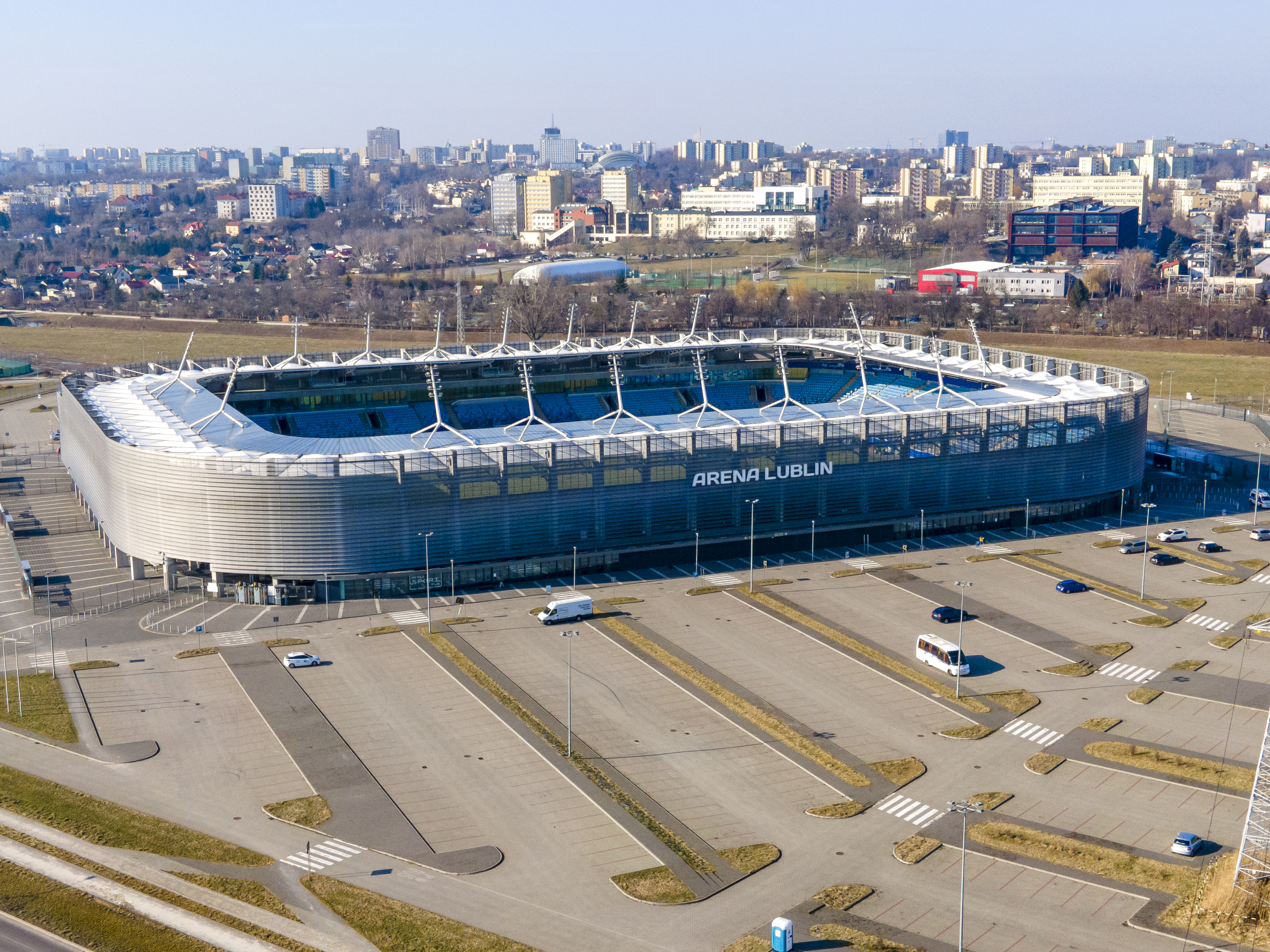
Arena Lublin, home venue of Motor Lublin football club and one of the arenas of the 2019 FIFA U-20 World Cup

Football, motorcycle speedway, basketball and handball are the most popular sports in the province.

Professional sports teams
Club	Sport	League	Trophies
Speed Car Motor Lublin	Speedway	Ekstraliga	3 Polish Championships (2022, 2023, 2024)
MKS Lublin	Handball (women's)	Polish Superliga	22 Polish Championships; 11 Polish Cups; 1 Women's EHF Cup (2001)
KS Azoty-Puławy	Handball (men's)	Polish Superliga	0
Padwa Zamość	Handball (men's)	Liga Centralna	0
Start Lublin	Basketball (men's)	Polish Basketball League	0
AZS UMCS Lublin	Basketball (women's)	Basket Liga Kobiet	2 Polish Championships (2023, 2026); 1 Polish Cup (2016)
Budowlani Lublin	Rugby union	Ekstraliga	1 Polish Cup (2002)
LUK Lublin	Volleyball (men's)	PlusLiga	1 Polish Championship (2025); 1 CEV Challenge Cup (2025); 1 Polish Cup (2026)
ChKS Chełm	Volleyball (men's)	PlusLiga	0
Avia Świdnik	Volleyball (men's)	I liga	0
Motor Lublin	Football (men's)	Ekstraklasa	0
Górnik Łęczna	Football (men's)	II liga	0
Avia Świdnik	Football (men's)	II liga	0
Górnik Łęczna	Football (women's)	Ekstraliga	3 Polish Championships (2018, 2019, 2020); 2 Polish Cups (2018, 2020)
AZS UMCS Lublin	Futsal (men's)	I liga	0

Additionally, AZS UMCS Lublin is one of the top athletics clubs in the country.

== Demographics ==
Historical population
Year	Pop.	±%
1988	2,209,221	—
2002	2,199,054	−0.5%
2011	2,175,700	−1.1%
2021	2,052,340	−5.7%

Population according to 2002 census:

- Poles - 2,171,415
- Ukrainians - 694

== Most common surnames in the region ==
1. Wójcik: 12,937
2. Mazurek: 9,644
3. Mazur: 8,019

== Previous Lublin Voivodeships ==
=== Lublin Voivodeship 1474–1795 ===
Lublin Voivodeship within the Polish–Lithuanian Commonwealth

Lublin Voivodeship (Latin: Palatinatus Lublinensis; Polish: Województwo Lubelskie) was an administrative region of the Kingdom of Poland created in 1474 out of parts of Sandomierz Voivodeship and lasting until the Partitions of Poland in 1795. It was part of the prowincja of Lesser Poland.

=== Lublin Voivodeship 1816–1837 ===
Lublin Voivodeship was one of the voivodeships of Congress Poland. It was formed in 1816 from Lublin Department, and in 1837 was transformed into Lublin Governorate.

=== Lublin Voivodeship 1919–1939 ===
Lublin Voivodeship (Województwo Lubelskie) was one of the administrative regions of the interwar Second Polish Republic. In early 1939 its area was 26,555 square kilometres (10,253 sq mi) and its population was 2,116,200. According to the 1931 census, 85.1% of its population was Polish, 10.5% Jewish, and 3% Ukrainian.

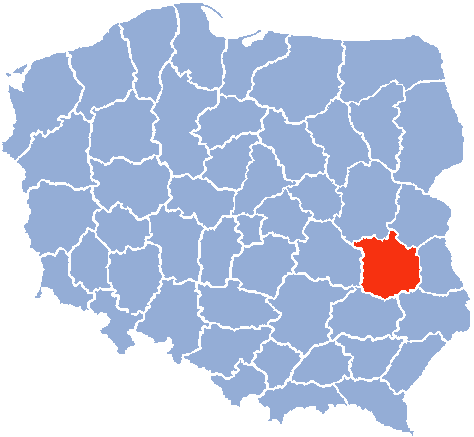
Lublin Voivodeship 1975–1998

=== Lublin Voivodeship 1945–1975 ===
Lublin Voivodeship (województwo lubelskie) was an administrative region of Poland between 1945 and 1975. In 1975 it was transformed into Chełm, Zamość, Biała Podlaska, Tarnobrzeg and Siedlce Voivodeships and a smaller Lublin Voivodeship.

=== Lublin Voivodeship 1975–1998 ===
Lublin Voivodeship (województwo lubelskie) existed as one of Poland's 49 voivodeships from 1975 until 1998, when it was incorporated into the current (larger) Lublin Voivodeship.
