= Flag of the Lublin Voivodeship =

Polish regional flag

Lublin Voivodeship
- Use: civil flag
- Proportion: 5:8
- Adopted: 14 June 2004
- Design: Three horizontal stripes: white (silver), red, and yellow (golden), with the coat of arms of the voivodeship, in form of the white (silver) male cervus mid-jump, with a yellow (golden) crown on its neck, placed on the red escutcheon, placed in the centre of the flag
- Designed by: Andrzej Heidrich
- Use: state flag
- Proportion: 3:4
- Adopted: 14 June 2004
- Design: White (silver) male jumping cervus, with a yellow (golden) crown on its neck on the red background
- Designed by: Andrzej Heidrich

The civil flag of the Lublin Voivodeship, Poland, is a tricolour rectangle with three horizontal stripes — white (silver), red, and yellow (golden) — and, in its centre, the coat of arms of the voivodeship, which consists of a white (silver) male jumping cervus, with a yellow (golden) crown on its neck, placed on the red escutcheon. The cervus is facing left. The top and bottom stripes are twice the size of the middle stripe.

== Design ==
The civil flag of the Lublin Voivodeship is a tricolour rectangle, with the aspect ratio of height to width of 5:8. It consists of three horizontal stripes, from top to bottom: white (silver), red and yellow (golden). The top and bottom stripes are twice the height of the middle stripe, a proportion of 2/5 each to 1/5. In the centre is located coat of arms of the voivodeship, in form of the white (silver) male jumping cervus, with a yellow (golden) crown on its neck, placed on the red escutcheon. The cervus is facing left. The colours of the flag are based on the colours of the coat of arms of the voivodeship.

The state flag of the Lublin Voivodeship is a red rectangle, with the aspect ratio of height to width of 3:4. It features the white (silver) male cervus mid-jump, with a yellow (golden) crown on its neck.

== History ==
The flag was adopted by the Lublin Regional Assembly, on 14 June 2004, in the resolution no. XIX/316/04. The flag and the coat of arms were designed by graphic designer Andrzej Heidrich.

The state flag was based on the banner of Lublin Land used during the battle of Grunwald, which depicted a white (silver) jumping cervus, with a yellow (golden) crown on its neck, placed on the red background.

== See also ==
- Coat of arms of the Lublin Voivodeship
