= Coat of arms of the Lublin Voivodeship =

Polish coat of arms

- Armiger: Lublin Voivodeship
- Adopted: 2002 (current version)
- Shield: Red Iberian style escutcheon
- Compartment: White (silver) male jumping cervus, with a yellow (golden) crown on its neck

The coat of arms that serves as the symbol of the Lublin Voivodeship, Poland depicts a white (silver) male jumping cervus (deer), with a yellow (golden) crown on its neck, placed on a red background. The current design of the coat of arms was designed by Andrzej Heidrich, and adopted in 2002.

== Design ==
The coat of arms depicts of a white (silver) male jumping cervus (deer), with a yellow (golden) crown on its neck. The cervus is facing left. The charge is placed within a red Iberian style escutcheon.

== History ==
=== Kingdom of Poland ===
The coat of arms of the Lublin Land, and the Lublin Voivodeship of the Crown of the Kingdom of Poland, that existed from 1474 to 1795.

The first mention of the deer used as the symbol of the Lublin Land comes from middle of the 14th century. In 1410, the Lublin Land was represented in the battle of Grunwald, with a red banner depicting a white (silver) jumping cervus (deer), with a yellow (golden) crown on its neck. The coat of arms is also mentioned in Annales seu cronicae incliti Regni Poloniae by Jan Długosz, written by him in years 1464–1480. In the book, the coat of arms is described with the following sentence: "Lublin Land carries a horned dear ready to jump placed on a red field, whose neck is decorated with a golden crown".

The exact origin of the design of the coat of arms remain unknown. According to some theories, the design could have originated from the coat of arms of the heraldic clan of Brochwicz. Several nobel families of that clan lived in the area of Lublin Land in the High Middle Ages. The coat of arms depicted a red cervus placed on a white (silver) background.

The coat of arms became a symbol of the Lublin Voivodeship of the Crown of the Kingdom of Poland, that was established in 1474. The coat of arms remained in such use until 1795, when the voivodeship ceased to exist following the Third Partition of Poland.

The coat of arms was also used in the seals of Sigismund I the Old, and Sigismund II Augustus, who ruled as the King of Poland and the Grand Duke of Lithuania, respectively, from 1506 to 1548, and from 1548 to 1572.

=== Congress Poland ===
The coat of arms of the Lublin Voivodeship (1816–1837), and later, the Lublin Governorate, used until 1844.

The Lublin Voivodeship of the Congress Poland was established on 16 January 1816. Its coat of arms was divided horizontally into two fields. The top field depicted a white (silver) male jumping cervus (deer), with a yellow (golden) crown on its neck, placed on a red background. The bottom field depicted a white (silver) bear and a tree trees growing on a green grass, placed on a green background. The bear stood behind the middle tree. The coat of arms was a combination of the historical coat of arms of the Lublin Voivodeship of the Polish–Lithuanian Commonwealth, and the Chełm Land. The voivodeship existed until 23 lutego 1837, when it was replaced by the Lublin Governorate, which continued using said coat of arms.

The coat of arms of the Lublin Governorate, used from 1845 to 1866.

In 1844, the Podlachian Governorate was incorporated into the Lublin Governorate. As such, the new coat of arms was combination of the two formerly used by those governorates. It was divided into four fields, two on top, and two on bottom. The top fields referred to the former coat of arms of the Lublin Governorate. The top right field depicted a white (silver) male jumping cervus (deer), with a yellow (golden) crown on its neck, placed on a red background. The top left field depicted a white (silver) bear and a tree trees growing on a green grass, placed on a green background. The bear stood behind the middle tree. The bottom fields referred to the former coat of arms of the Podlachian Governorate. The bottom right field depicted a white eagle with yellow (golden) legs, rising its wings, placed on a red background. The bottom left field depicted a knight in a white (silver) armor, sitting on a white (silver) horse with a blue saddle and shabrack, standing on its back hoofs. The knight has a blue shield with a yellow (golden) cross of Lorraine on it, put on his left arm, and hold a sword in his right hand. They are placed on a red background. The coat of arms was approved by the viceroy of Poland, Ivan Paskevich, on 5 October 1845, and later, by the tsar or Russia, Nicholas I, on 26 May 1849. It remained in use until 1866.

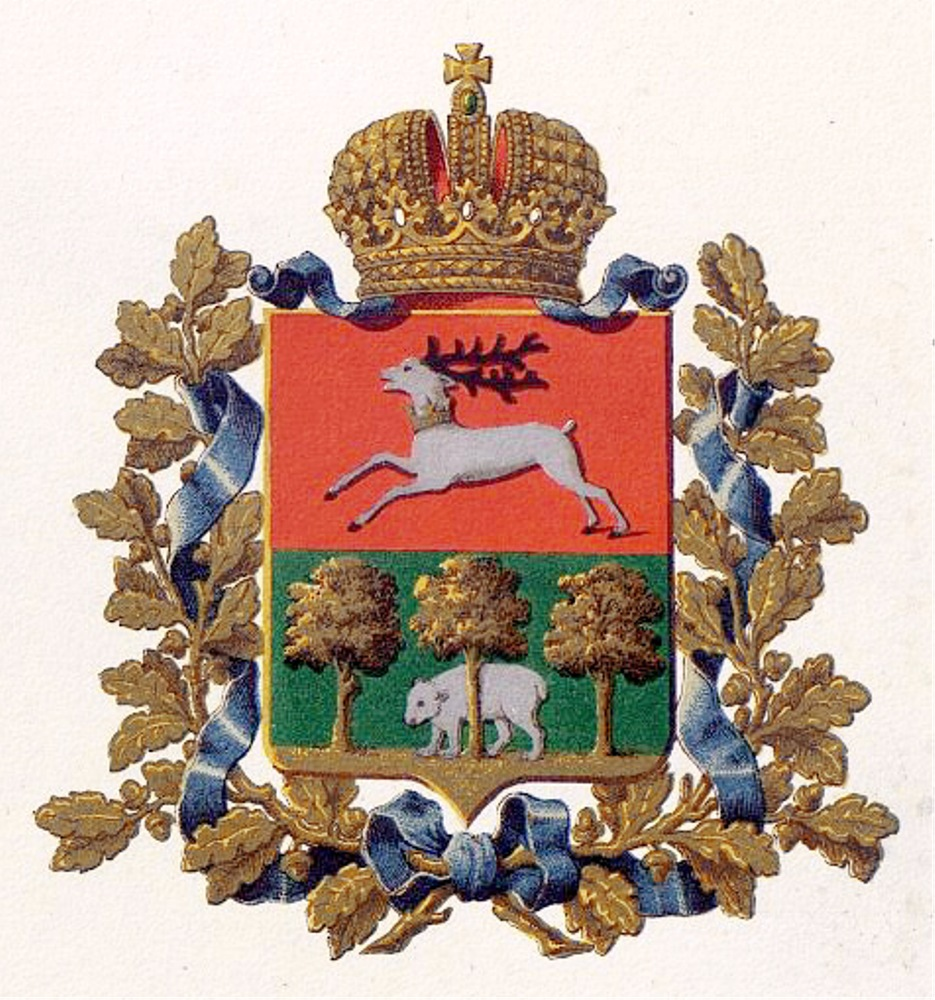
The coat of arms of the Lublin Governorate, used from 1869 to 1915.

In 1867, the governorate had been partitioned into the governorates of Lublin and Siedlce. The new design of the coat of arms of the Lublin Governorate had been approved on 25 February 1869. It consisted of a blue French-style escutcheon which was divided horizontally into two fields. The top field depicted a white (silver) male jumping cervus (deer), with a yellow (golden) crown on its neck, placed on a red background. The bottom field depicted a white (silver) bear and a tree trees growing on a green grass, placed on a green background. The bear stood behind the middle tree. Around the shield, there are yellow (golden) leaves of the oak tree, interspersed with the blue ribbon of the Order of St. Andrew. On the top of the coat of arms, above the escutcheon, there was the yellow (golden) Imperial Crown of Russia. The coat of arms was used until 1915, when the governorate ceased to exist.

=== Second Republic of Poland ===
The design of the coat of arms of the Lublin Voivodeship proposed in 1928.

In 1928, as part of the project to design the coat of arms for the voivodeships of the Second Polish Republic, the design for the coat of arms of the Warsaw Voivodeship had been created. Though planned to be officially approved, it never was, as it was decided to postpone the approval of the subdivision symbols due to the planned administrative reform, that eventually took place in 1938. Eventually, the plans for the establishment of the coat of arms had been stopped by the Invasion of Poland by Nazi Germany, on 1 September 1939, that begun the World War II, and were not picked up back after the end of the conflict.

The proposed design consisted of a red Iberian style escutcheon, with square top and rounded base, that was divided horizontally into two fields. The top field depicted a white (silver) male jumping cervus (deer) facing left, with a yellow (golden) crown on its neck, placed on a red background. The bottom field depicted a white (silver) bear and a tree trees growing on a green grass, placed on a green background. The bear stood behind the middle tree, and faced right.

=== Third Republic of Poland ===
The coat of arms of the Biała Podlaska Voivodeship used from 1997 to 1998.

On 29 March 1996, the Biała Podlaska Voivodeship of Poland had adopted its coat of arms. It featured a knight in a blue armor, sitting on a white (silver) horse with a blue horse tack, including the saddle and shabrack, standing on its back legs. The knight has a blue shield with a yellow (golden) cross of Lorraine on it, put on his left arm, and hold a white (silver) sword in his right hand.

The Biała Podlaska Voivodeship ceased to exist on 31 December 1998, and was replaced by the Lublin Voivodeship on the next day. Its currently-used coat of arms had been designed by Andrzej Heidrich, and based on the historical coat of arms. It was adopted by the Lublin Voivodeship Sejmik on 23 September 2002.

== See also ==
- flag of the Lublin Voivodeship
