= Umer Adamanov =

Soviet Crimean Tatar partisan in Poland (1916–1943)

Umer Aqmolla Adamanov
- Native name: Crimean Tatar: Ümer Aqmolla Adamanov; Russian: Умер Акмолла Адаманов; Polish: Umer Achmołła Adamanow
- Nickname: "Miszka-Tatar"
- Born: 15 April 1916; Vasilyevka, Crimea
- Died: 1 June 1943 (aged 27) Józefów, Biłgoraj County, Nazi-occupied Poland
- Allegiance: Soviet Union; Poland
- Branch: Red Army (Poland) Gwardia Ludowa
- Service years: 1939–1941; 1942–1943
- Rank: Captain (posthumously)
- Commands: Kotovsky Guerrilla detachment
- Conflicts: World War II; Battle of Uman; Zamość uprising
- Awards: Order of the Cross of Grunwald

Umer Aqmolla Adamanov (Crimean Tatar: Ümer Aqmolla Adamanov, Russian: Уме́р Акмолла́ Адама́нов, Polish: Umer Achmołła Adamanow; 15 April 1916, Ai-Vasil', Derekoe parish, Yaltinsky Uyezd, Taurida Governorate, Russian Empire — 1 June 1943, Gmina Józefów, Lublin Voivodeship, Poland, Nazi Germany) was a Crimean Tatar soldier Red Army who became a partisan detachment leader in the Polish resistance during World War II. After he was wounded in battle and taken prisoner by the Germans he was sent to a prisoner-of-war camp in Nazi-occupied Poland, but he later escaped from the camp and helped organize a partisan detachment of the communist underground Gwardia Ludowa.

== Early life ==
Adamanov was born in 1916 to a Crimean Tatar peasant family in the village of Vasilyevka, Crimea. His father was declared a kulak in 1929 and deported to the Urals, where he soon died of typhus. After the loss of his father his mother was left to raise Umer and his younger sister Khadija by herself. Umer went on to work at a state farm. Upon the German invasion of the Soviet Union in 1941 Adamanov was drafted into the Red Army and forced to leave his wife Vera and infant son Shevket.

== World War II ==
=== Red Army service ===
While in the Red Army he served in the 97th Rifle Regiment of the 18th Rifle Division. During the fighting in Orsha in winter 1941 he was wounded in battle and taken captive by the Germans, after which he was sent to a POW camp in Czestochowa, Poland.

=== Partisan activities ===
When he escaped the camp in 1942 he helped organize a partisan detachment with the support of Major-General Sergey Ogurtsov and Vasily "the Georgian" Mandzhavidze. Starting in the middle of summer 1942, the detachment took on the name Grigory Kotovsky in honor of the Soviet General and began operations in Puszcza Solska under the commander of Ogurtsov. After Ogurstov was killed in action during fighting in the village of Zielone, Adamonov took command of the detachment, which soon became part of the Tadeusz Kościuszko Task force of the Gwardia Ludowa. His role as a partisan earned him the nickname "Miszka Tatar", which later became legend in the Polish Workers Party. In the spring of 1943, the Nazis forces in Poland offered a reward of 100,000 zlotys for the capture or death of Adamanov.

From March to June 1943, the detachment led by Adamanov conducted a multiple successful sabotage missions, resulting in the destruction of 12 tanks and 2 aircraft, in addition to trains transporting military supplies. On 24 April, several members of the detachment managed to escape from enemy encirclement and went towards the rear of enemy lines, after which they killed 7 German soldiers and seized German weapons and ammunition. Just a few days later on 1 May, the guerrillas attacked a sawmill in Tereszpol; after killing the building comandant they stole ammunition being stored in the building before burning it. The partisans pursued the remaining guards of the sawmill who fled, and on 16 May the rest of the German sawmill guards were killed by the partisans in Długi Kąt and Krasnobród. Three days later they mined the railway tracks near Zwierzyniec in the section between Rejowiec and Rava-Ruska, resulting in the derailment of an enemy train.

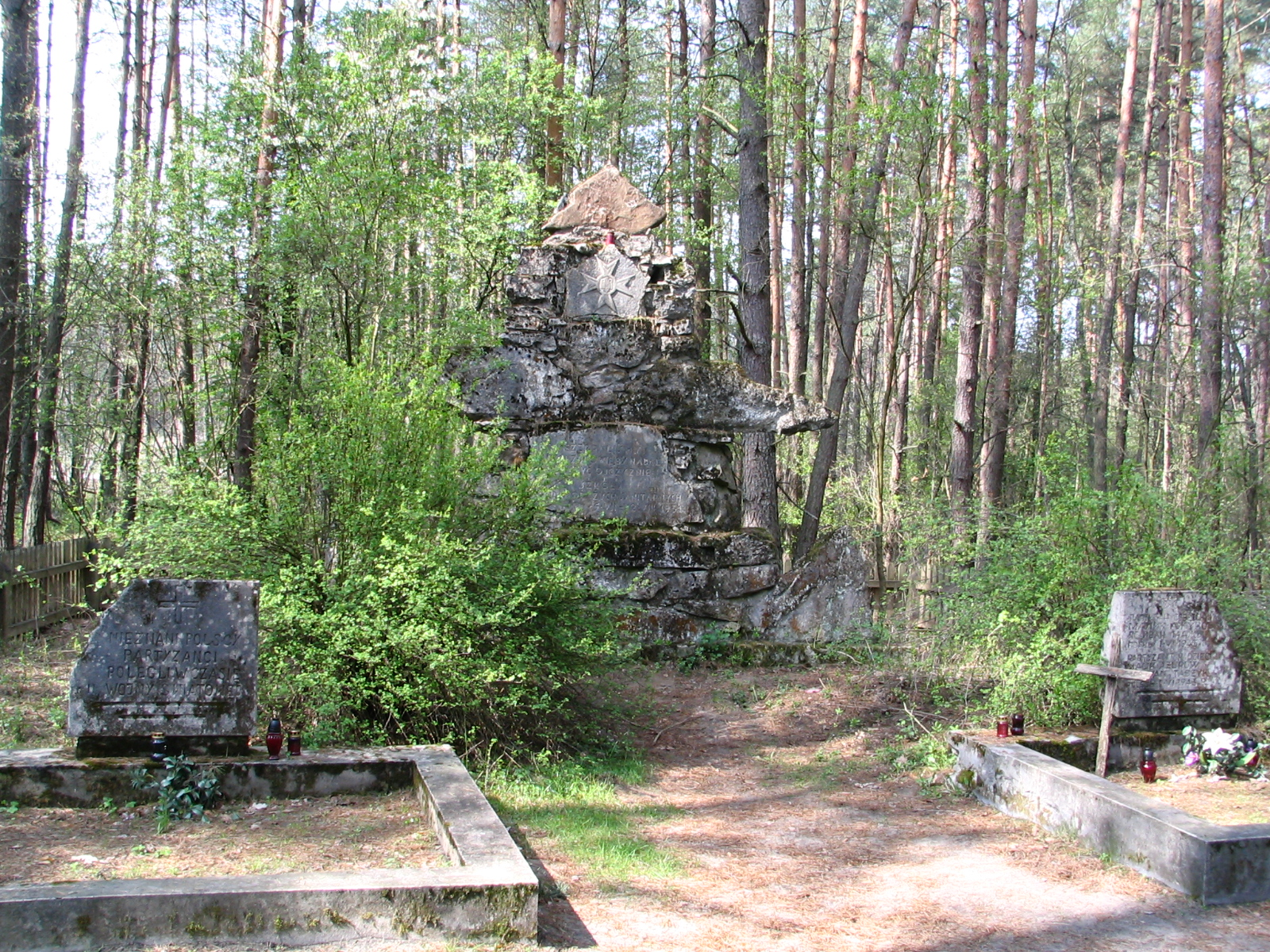
2006 photograph of the cemetery in Hamernia, Józefów where Adamanov is buried.

==== Last stand ====
The command of the detachment learned of the arrival of an armored train of SS men in the village of Jozefów on 1 June 1943. The SS men began raiding a local church and massacring local villagers as part of the genocide of Polish people. A group of 50 partisans under the command of Adamanov attacked the enemy garrison, despite the numerical superiority of the enemy's forces, and began pushing the Germans back towards the railway. Adamanov fought advanced in the battle with the use of a light machine gun, but was killed by a German sniper after he stood up and went into attack after injuring his left hand. After his death he was posthumously awarded the Order of the Cross of Grunwald 3rd class and promoted to the rank of captain. Despite fighting to the death against the Nazis, Adamanov's entire family in Crimea was deported to Central Asia because of their Crimean Tatar ethnicity, where many of them died of malaria and starvation.

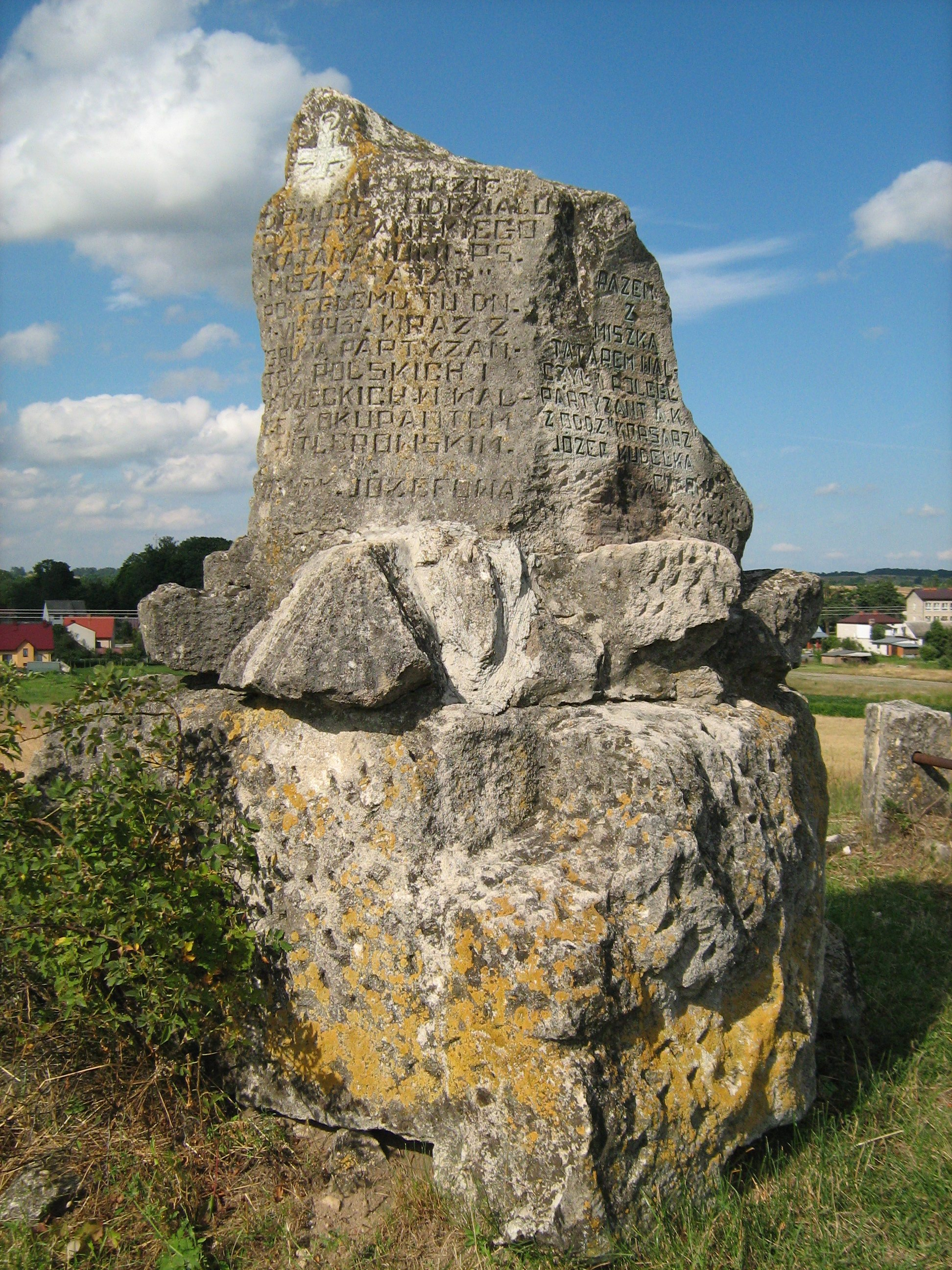
Monument to "Miszka-Tatar" in Józefów, Poland.

== Identification and memorialization ==
After the end of World War II, numerous articles in the Polish and Russian press speculated about the identity of the partisan with the pseudonym "Miszka-Tatar". Wojciech Sulevsky, a Polish writer, and Mikhail Sergeyev, a journalist from Kazan, were tasked with identifying the partisan. People speculated to the unidentified partisan included Mikhail Atamanov from Yelabuga. Later, historian and retired colonel Nikolai Prokopyuk concluded in an article published in Krasnaya Zvezda that "Miszka-Tatar" was Umer Akmolla Adamanov, based on examination by the Central Research Institute of Forensic Examination of pre-war photographs and photos of the partisan. In 1990, after five rounds of analysis, Mikhail Sergeyev stated Polish and Soviet historians agreed that "Miszka-Tatar" was Umer Adamanov. Streets in both Poland and Crimea are named in his honor, and Adamanov remains commemorated as a war hero in both Poland and Crimea.
