= Order of the Star of Romania =

Highest active State decoration of Romania

Order of the Star of Romania Ordinul Steaua României
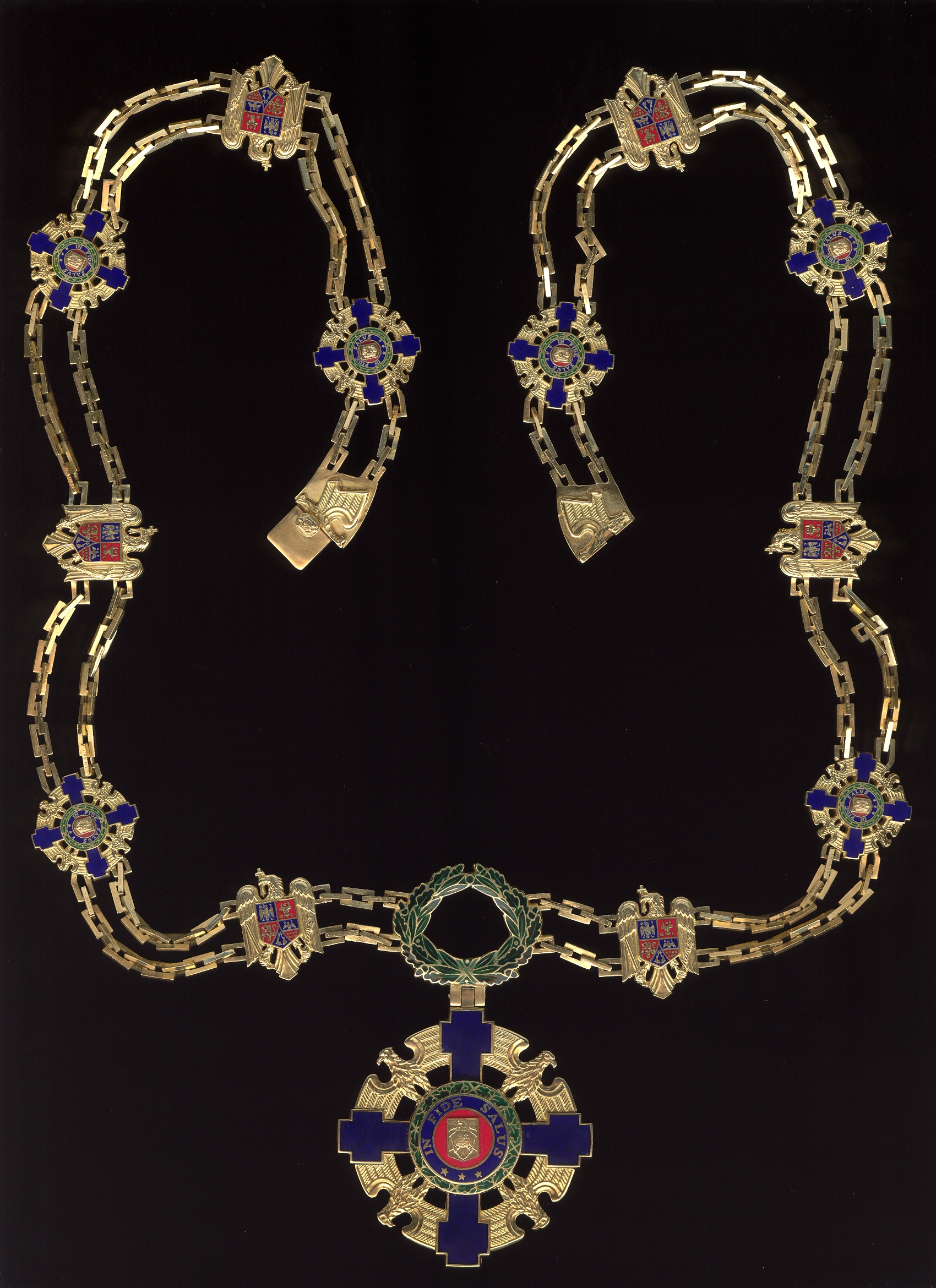
- Collar of the Order

Awarded by the King of Romania (1877–1947) The President of Romania since 1998
- Type: Order of Merit
- Country: Kingdom of Romania; Romania
- Eligibility: (1) Civil, Military; (2) Military units; (3) Foreign citizens
- Criteria: (1) Exceptional civil and military services to the Romanian State and the Romanian people; (2) For special acts in time of peace or for heroic acts in time of war; (3) For contributing to the development of the friendship relations with Romania, or for other exceptional services to the Romanian State and the Romanian People.
- Status: Currently awarded
- Grand Master: President Nicușor Dan
- Grades: Collar; Grand Cross; Grand Officer; Commander; Officer; Knight/Dame

Precedence
- Next (higher): Order of Michael the Brave
- Next (lower): Order of Faithful Service
- Ribbon of the Order of the Star of Romania

The Order of the Star of Romania (Romanian: Ordinul Steaua României) is Romania's highest civil Order and second highest State decoration after the Order of Michael the Brave. It is the oldest Order of Romania. It is awarded by the President of Romania, and has six grades, from lowest to the highest: Knight, Officer, Commander, Grand Officer, Grand Cross, and Collar.

== History ==
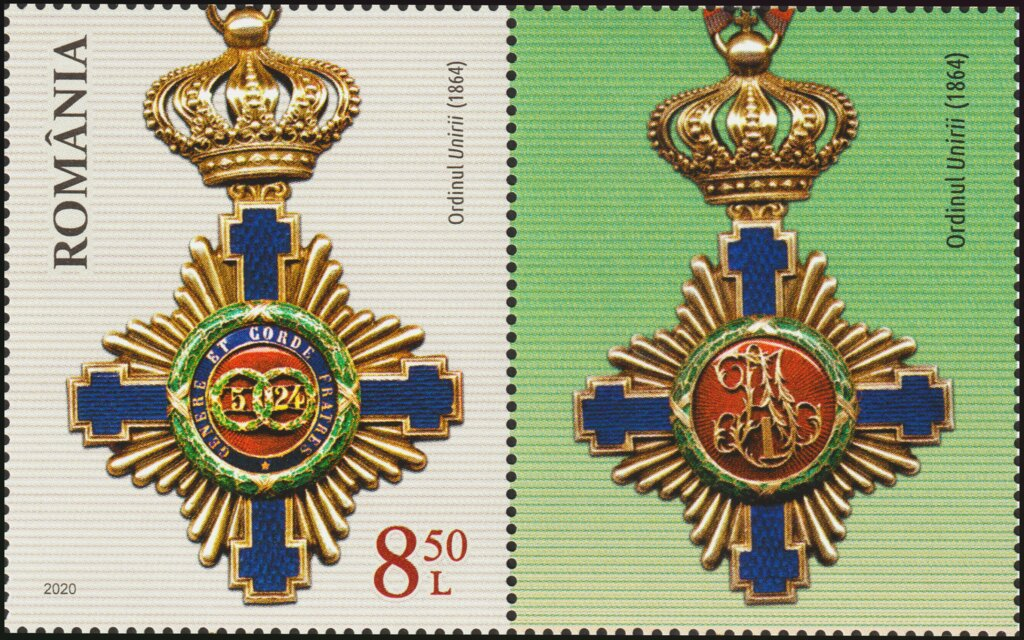
Obverse and reverse of the 1864 Order of the Union

In 1863, Alexandru Ioan Cuza, the Domnitor of the United Principalities of Moldavia and Wallachia, asked the Romanian representative to Paris to contact the then well-known jewellery house Krétly, to manufacture a state decoration. Krétly presented a model, which was immediately accepted by the domnitor, and based on his agreement, 1,000 pieces of the order were made. It was decided that the order would have five ranks: Knight (Cavaler), Officer (Ofițer), Commander (Comandor), Grand Officer (Mare Ofițer), and Grand Cross (Mare Cruce).

Unlike all other decorations in that time that were mostly inspired on the French Légion d'honneur, or which had their insignia like a Maltese cross, the model proposed by Krétly for this order was a blue cross crosslet (cruce repetată), a design that was then unique in decorational design.

The domnitor decided that the name of the honour would be "The Order of the Union" ("Ordinul Unirii"). It was planned to institute the order on 24 January 1864, the date when the 5th anniversary of his election would be celebrated and a moment that marked the unification of the principalities of Moldavia and Wallachia. Because of this, the motto of the new order would fit the event: "GENERE ET CORDES FRATRES" ("BROTHERS THROUGH ORIGINS AND FEELINGS"). The obverse of the insignia would bear the numbers "5" and "24", the days of January when he was elected in both Moldova and Wallachia.

Unable to legally institute the order due to Romania's status as an Ottoman vassal, Cuza awarded the insignia therefore only as a personal present, not as a state decoration. Most of the insignia produced for him remained stored in the Royal Palace's cellars.

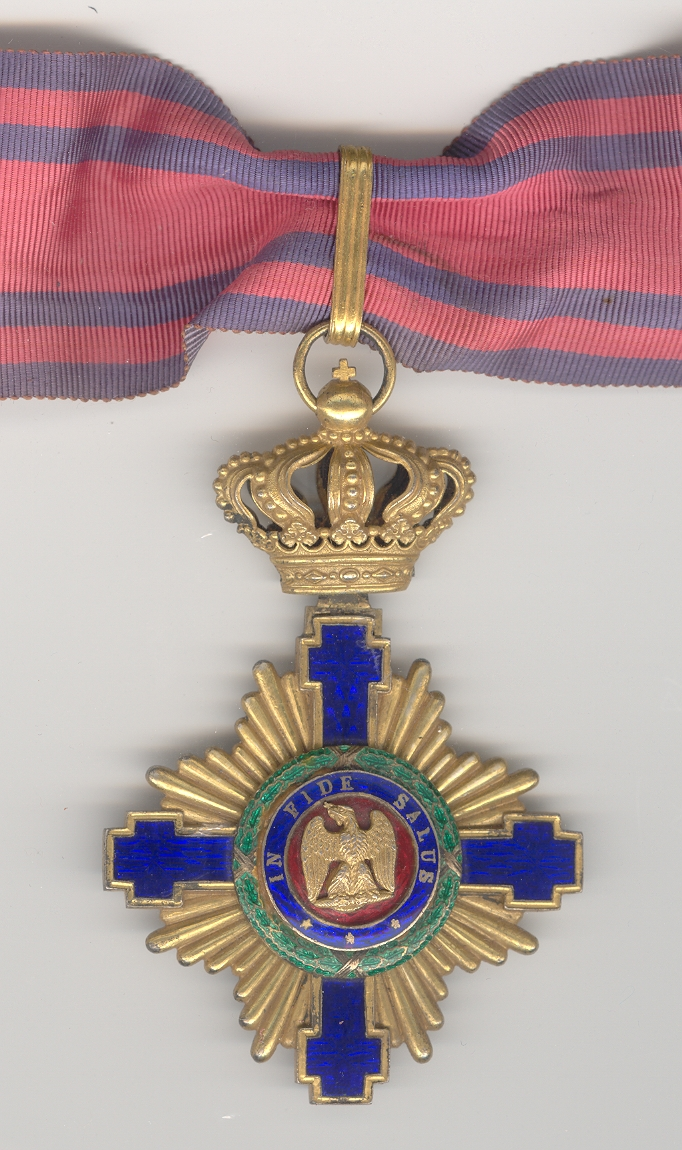
The original 1877 model - Commander rank (obverse).

In April 1877, when Romania gained independence from the Ottoman Empire, the debate regarding the institution of Romanian decorations was revived. Mihail Kogălniceanu, Minister of Foreign Affairs in the Ion Brătianu cabinet, took part in the debates in the Assembly of Deputies regarding the institution of a state decoration. Because of the already earlier supplied "Order of The Union", it was decided that the shape of the decoration would be the same, modifying only the domnitor's seal. The motto was also changed, because the old one was not appropriate to the moment, to "IN FIDE SALUS" ("IN FAITH IS THE SALVATION"). Regarding the name, Kogălniceanu insisted on "Steaua Dunării" ("The Star of The Danube").

The name "Steaua României" ("The Star of Romania") appeared on 10 May 1877, when the law was voted in the Parliament, as the first law of the Sovereign Romania.

By Royal Decree (no. 1545/1932), King Carol II changed the order of precedence in the Romanian honours system. As a result, in 1932, The Star of Romania dropped in precedence from second place (where it had been since 1906) to fourth place (after the Order of Carol I and the Order of Ferdinand I). In 1937, it dropped to seventh place. The main shape of the order, the blue repeated cross (called also "Romanian cross") was kept, but the rays between the cross' arms were replaced by four heraldic eagles with wings spread, the insignia of King Carol I was placed on the obverse, and the reverse bore the year of its establishment, "1877". Also the number of persons that could be awarded The Star of Romania was increased:

- Knight (Cavaler): 1,000 civilians and 350 military;
- Officer (Ofițer): 500 civilians and 150 military;
- Commander (Comandor): 200 civilians and 75 military;
- Grand Officer (Mare Ofițer): 75 civilians and 25 military;
- Grand Cross (Mare Cruce): 35 civilians and 10 military.

In 1938, the order was given a superior rank, called "Clasa I" (First Class in English), between the Grand Officer rank and the Grand Cross rank, with a maximum of 50 civilians and 15 military personnel.

The statutes established by King Carol II were changed by General Ion Antonescu (who became Conducător on 4 September 1940). Generally, the rules were the ones used during World War I. The order "The Star of Romania" became the second in the national hierarchy, after that of the Order of Michael the Brave.

Inspired by the German Iron Cross, Ion Antonescu decided that the first three grades of the orders the Star of Romania and the Crown of Romania, with spades (swords), and the ribbon of The Medal "The Military Virtue" would be awarded for exceptionally brave acts with an oak leaf, attached to the ribbon.

After 1948, all the existing decorations were outlawed, and their wearing was forbidden. Just by keeping the insignia, one was considered a delinquent in the first years of communism.

In 1993, the idea of reinstating the oldest Order was proposed within the Special Commission of the Chamber of Deputies. After several attempts, in 1998/1999 the National Order "The Star of Romania" was reinstituted, with a design similar to the one used in 1932, but without the insignia of King Carol I, and with the republican insignia.

== Grades ==
As per Law 29/2000, regarding Romania's national system of decorations, there are currently six grades:

- 1st Class: Collar (Colan);
- 2nd Class: Grand Cross (Mare Cruce);
- 3rd Class: Grand Officer (Mare Ofițer);
- 4th Class: Commander (Comandor);
- 5th Class: Officer (Ofițer);
- 6th Class: Knight (Cavaler).

== Notable recipients ==
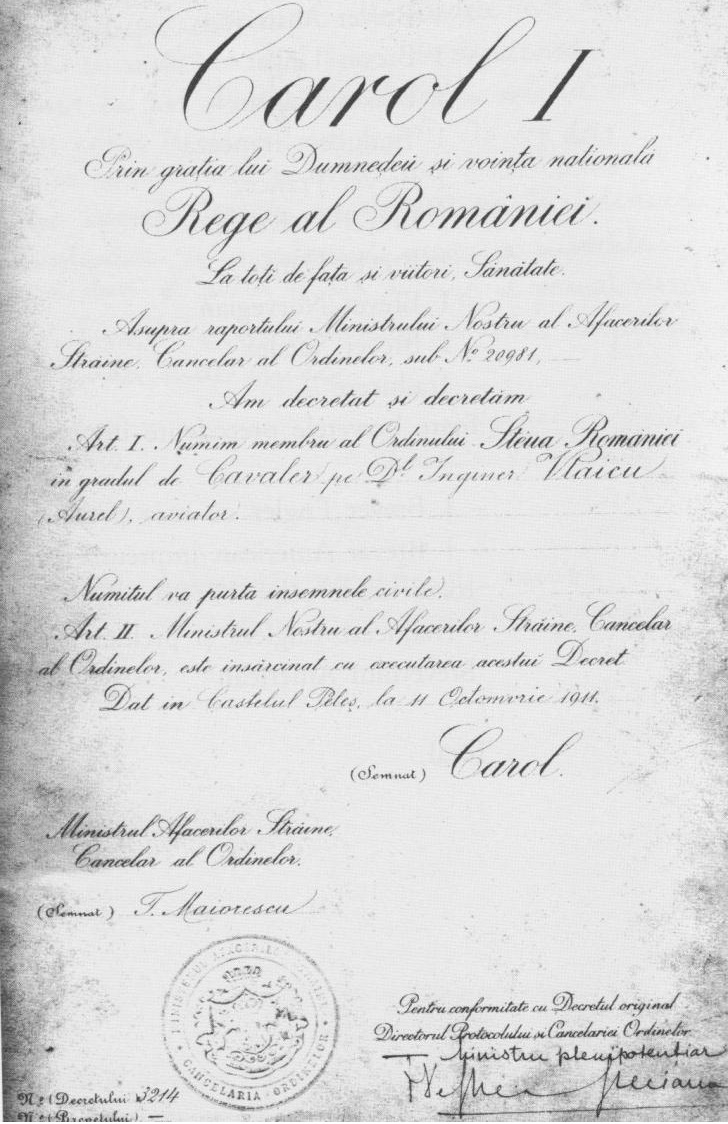
1911 - Carol I: Certificate awarding the Star of Romania (Knight grade) to Aurel Vlaicu.

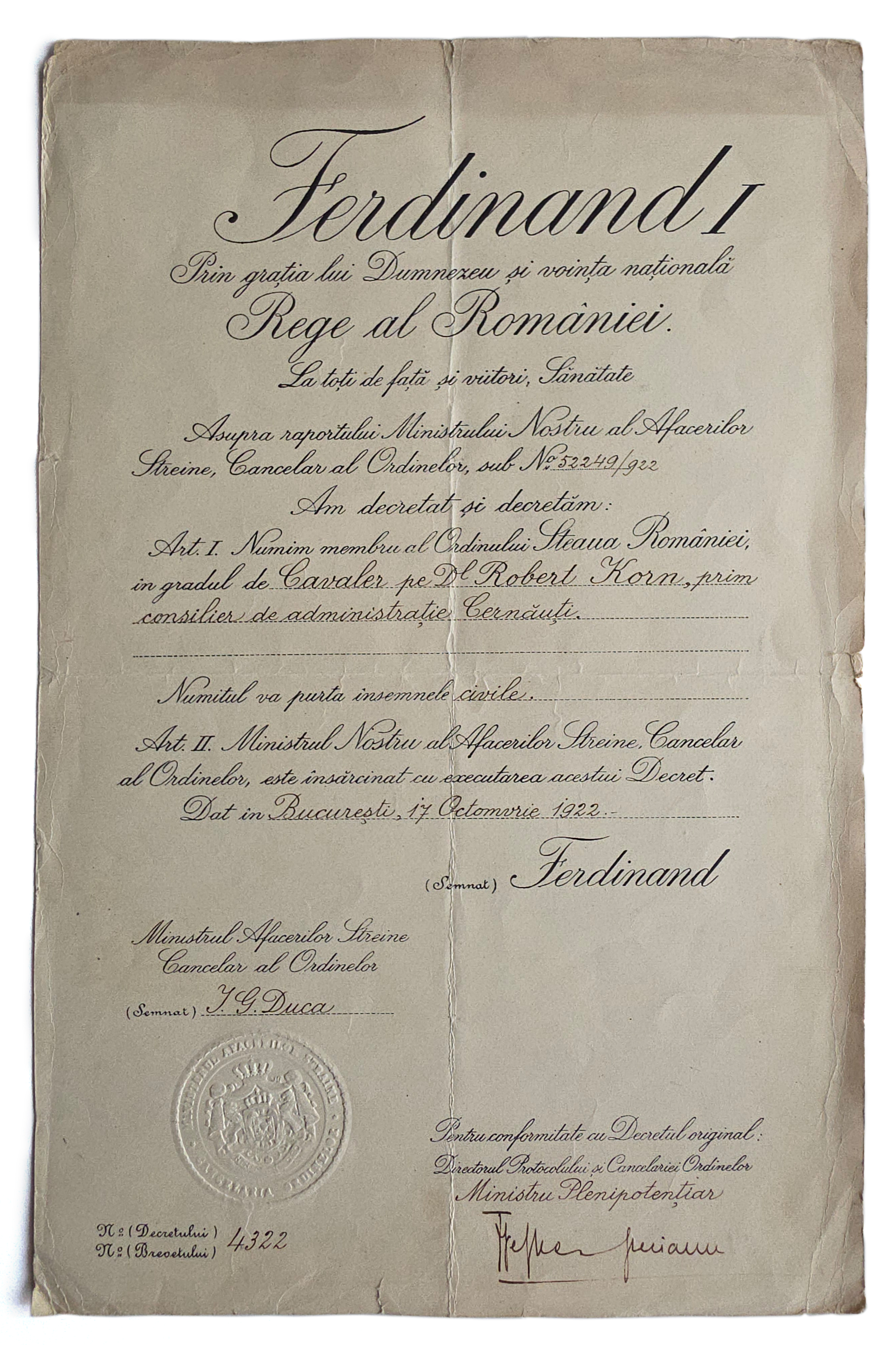
1922 - Ferdinand I: Certificate awarding the Star of Romania (Knight grade, civilian) to Robert Korn.

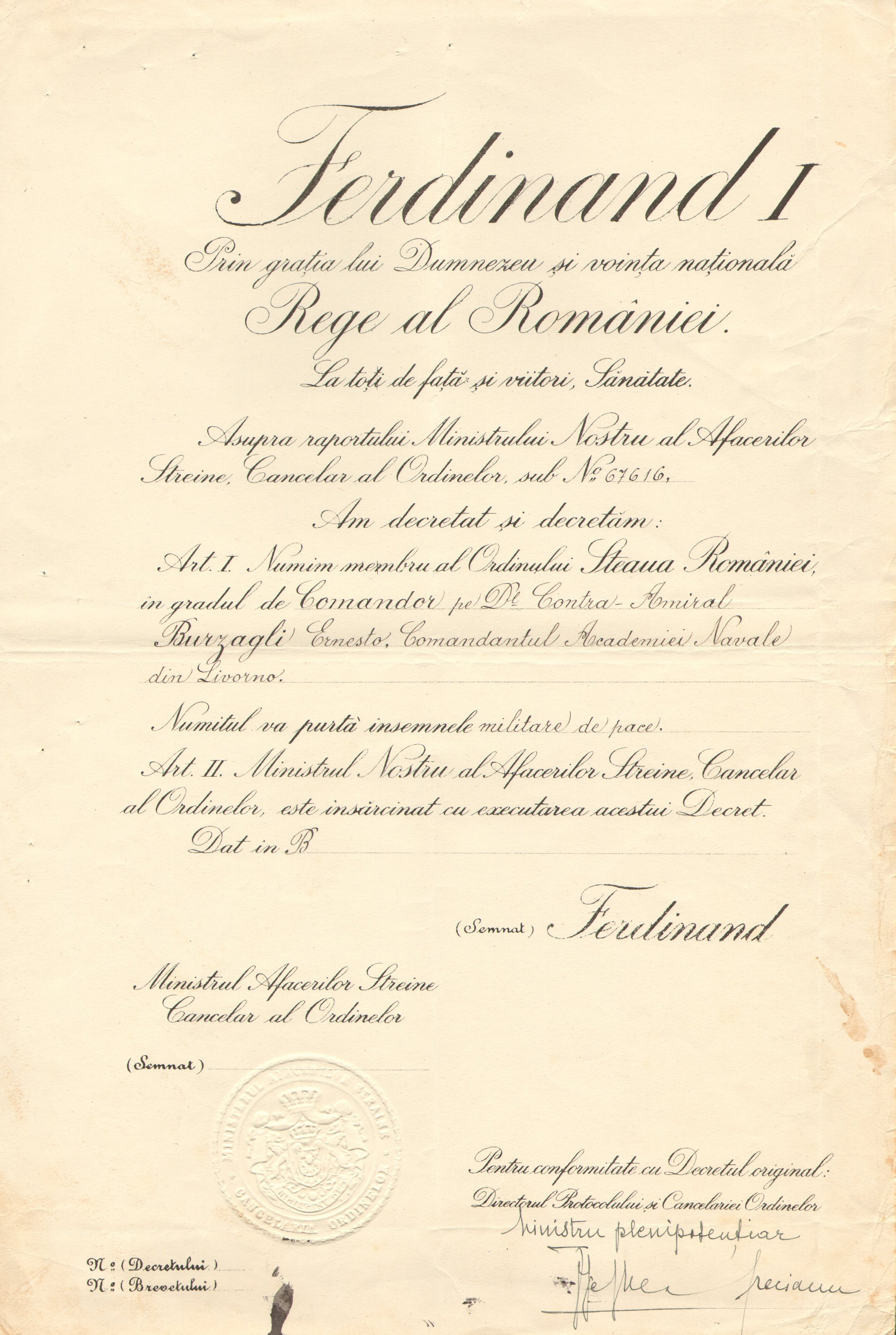
1926 - Ferdinand I: Certificate awarding the Star of Romania (Commander grade, military in time of peace) to Ernesto Burzagli.

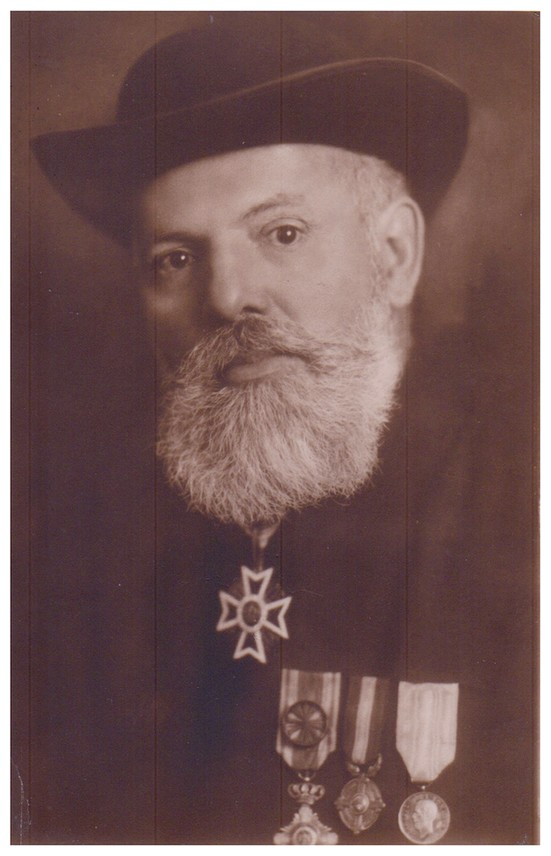
Alexandru Munteanu wearing an Officer's cross, civilian version.

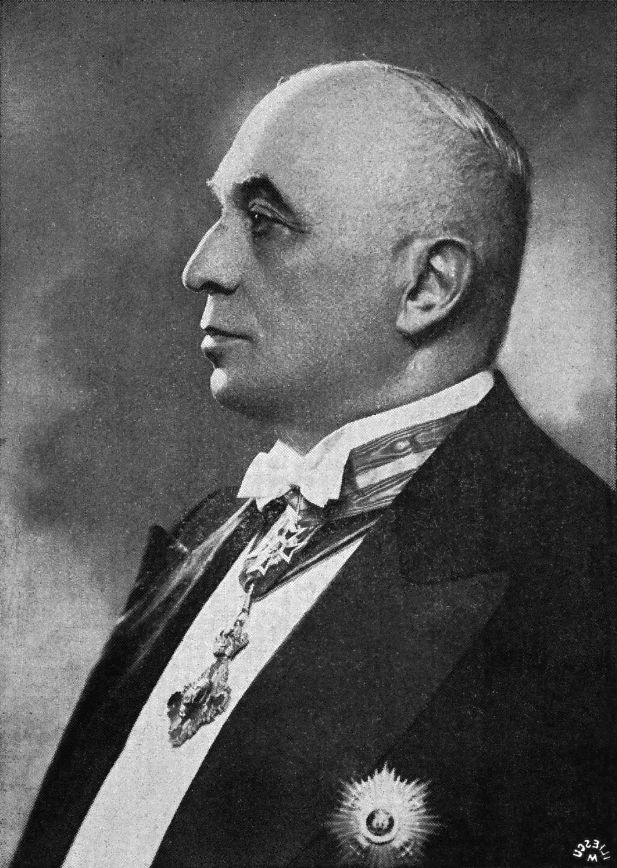
Dr. Dimitrie Tușinschi wearing a Commander's cross, civilian version, awarded in 1928.

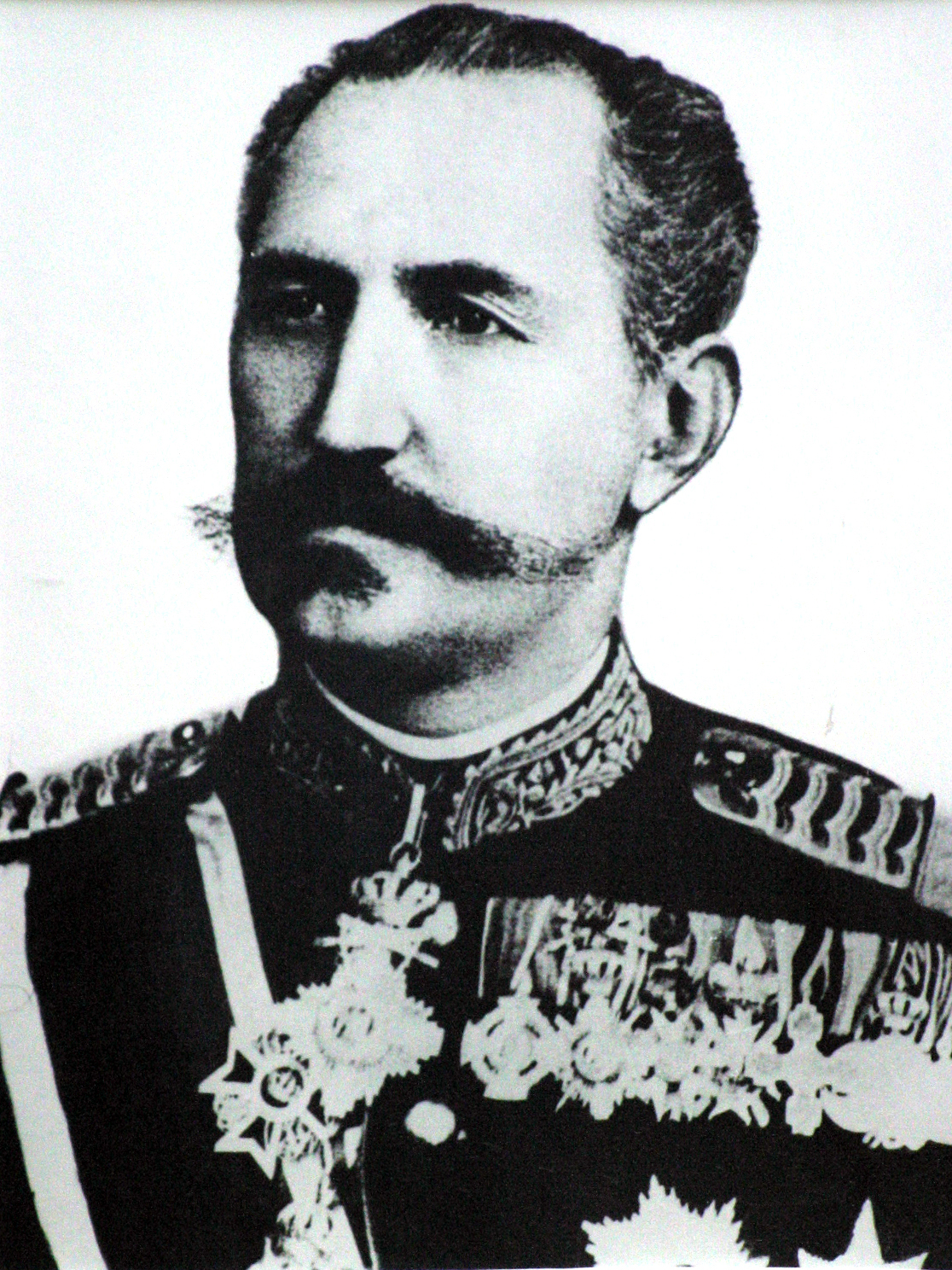
Constantin Poenaru wearing a Grand Officer's cross, military version with crossed swords.

=== First issue (1877–1948) ===
- Ernesto Burzagli
- Archduke Eugen of Austria (1881)
- Friedrich von Beck-Rzikowsky
- Aurel Vlaicu (1911)
- Pratap Singh of Idar (1921)
- Jan Karcz
- Aristide Razu (1918)
- Harry Gideon Wells (1919)
- Ismail of Johor (1920)
- Hendrik Pieter Nicolaas Muller (1922)
- Scarlat Cantacuzino
- Artur Phleps
- Edward Rydz-Śmigły
- Jack Corbu (1930)
- Stanisław Maczek
- Amha Selassie of Ethiopia
- Rudolf Walden
- Fritz Witt (1942)
- Martin Unrein
- Jagatjit Singh of Kapurthala (1935)
- Walter Staudinger (1942)
- Ismail of Johor (1942)
- Walther Wenck (1943)
- Emmerich Jordan (1944)
- Samuel C. Cumming
- Paul de Smet de Naeyer
- Joseph Maria von Radowitz
- Klement Gottwald (1947)

=== Second issue (since 1998) ===
==== Foreign citizens ====
No.	Name	Known for	Year Appointed
1	(France) Jacques Chirac	President of France	1998
2	(Peru) Alberto Fujimori	President of Peru	1998
3	(Finland) Martti Ahtisaari	President of Finland	1998
4	(Bulgaria) Petar Stoyanov	President of Bulgaria	1998
5	(Poland) Aleksander Kwaśniewski	President of Poland	1999
6	(Austria) Thomas Klestil	President of Austria	1999
7	(Greece) Konstantinos Stephanopoulos	President of Greece	1999
8	(Turkey) Süleyman Demirel	President of Turkey	1999
9	(Norway) Harald V	King of Norway	1999
10	(Qatar) Hamad bin Khalifa Al Thani	Emir of Qatar	1999
11	(Kuwait) Jaber Al-Ahmad Al-Sabah	Emir of Kuwait	1999
12	(Kazakhstan) Nursultan Nazarbayev	President of Kazakhstan	1999
13	(Albania) Rexhep Meidani	President of Albania	1999
14	(Israel) Ezer Weizman	President of Israel	1999
15	(Moldova) Petru Lucinschi	President of Moldova	2000
16	(United Kingdom) Elizabeth II	Queen of the United Kingdom	2000
17	(Portugal) Jorge Sampaio	President of Portugal	2000
18	(Hungary) Árpád Göncz	President of Hungary	2000
19	(Denmark) Margrethe II	Queen of Denmark	2000
20	(Slovakia) Rudolf Schuster	President of Slovakia	2000
21	(Croatia) Stjepan Mesić	President of Croatia	2000
22	(Mexico) Ernesto Zedillo	President of Mexico	2000
23	(Brazil) Fernando Henrique Cardoso	President of Brazil	2000
24	(Thailand) Bhumibol Adulyadej	King of Thailand	2000
25	(Ukraine) Leonid Kuchma	President of Ukraine	2000
26	(Lebanon) Émile Lahoud	President of Lebanon	2001
27	(Ghana) Kofi Annan	Secretary-General of the United Nations	2001
28	(Netherlands) Beatrix	Queen of the Netherlands	2001
29	(Lithuania) Valdas Adamkus	President of Lithuania	2001
30	(Latvia) Vaira Vīķe-Freiberga	President of Latvia	2001
31	(Sovereign Military Order of Malta) Andrew Bertie	Prince and Grand Master of the Order of Malta	2002
32	(United Arab Emirates) Zayed bin Sultan Al Nahyan	President of United Arab Emirates	2002
33	(Philippines) Gloria Macapagal Arroyo	President of Philippines	2002
34	(Slovenia) Milan Kučan	President of Slovenia	2002
35	(Hungary) Ferenc Mádl	President of Hungary	2002
36	(United States) George W. Bush	President of the United States	2002
37	(San Marino) Mauro Chiaruzzi	Captains Regent of San Marino	2002
38	(San Marino) Giuseppe Maria Morganti	Captains Regent of San Marino	2002
39	(Tunisia) Zine El Abidine Ben Ali	President of Tunisia	2003
40	(Sweden) Carl XVI Gustaf	King of Sweden	2003
41	(Spain) Juan Carlos I	King of Spain	2003
42	(Italy) Carlo Azeglio Ciampi	President of Italy	2003
43	(Estonia) Arnold Rüütel	President of Estonia	2003
44	(United States) Condoleezza Rice	United States Secretary of State	2003
45	(Luxembourg) Henri I	Grand Duke of Luxembourg	2004
46	(Vatican City) Angelo Sodano	Cardinal Secretary of State	2004
47	(Malta) Eddie Fenech Adami	President of Malta	2004
48	(San Marino) Giuseppe Arzilli	Captains Regent of San Marino	2004
49	(San Marino) Roberto Raschi	Captains Regent of San Marino	2004
50	(Chile) Ricardo Lagos	President of Chile	2004
51	(Azerbaijan) Ilham Aliyev	President of Azerbaijan	2004
52	(Jordan) Abdullah II	King of Jordan	2005
53	(Finland) Tarja Halonen	President of Finland	2006
55	(Vatican City) Tarcisio Bertone	Cardinal Secretary of State	2008
56	(Sovereign Military Order of Malta) Matthew Festing	Prince and Grand Master of the Order of Malta	2008
57	(Poland) Lech Kaczyński	President of Poland	2009
58	(Lebanon) Michel Suleiman	President of Lebanon	2009
59	(Monaco) Albert II	Prince of Monaco	2009
60	(Belgium) Albert II	King of the Belgians	2009
61	(Moldova) Mihai Ghimpu	President of Moldova	2010
62	(Malta) George Abela	President of Malta	2010
63	(Latvia) Valdis Zatlers	President of Latvia	2011
65	(Estonia) Toomas Hendrik Ilves	President of Estonia	2011
66	(Italy) Giorgio Napolitano	President of Italy	2011
67	(Vatican City) Pietro Parolin	Cardinal Secretary of State	2015
68	(Portugal) Aníbal Cavaco Silva	President of Portugal	2015
69	(United Kingdom) Dennis Deletant	Professor	2015
70	(Lithuania) Dalia Grybauskaitė	President of Lithuania	2015
71	(Italy) Sergio Mattarella	President of Italy	2016
72	(Bulgaria) Rosen Plevneliev	President of Bulgaria	2016
73	(Germany) Joachim Gauck	President of Germany	2016
74	(Poland) Andrzej Duda	President of Poland	2016
75	(France) François Hollande	President of France	2016
76	(Slovakia) Andrej Kiska	President of Slovakia	2016
77	(Moldova) Nicolae Timofti	President of Moldova	2017
78	(Croatia) Kolinda Grabar-Kitarović	President of Croatia	2017
79	(United Kingdom) Charles III	King of the United Kingdom	2017
80	(France) Dominique Prince de La Rochefoucauld-Montbel	Grand Hospitaler of Order of Malta (SMOM)	2017
81	(France) Frédéric Jenny	Professor	2017
82	(Estonia) Kersti Kaljulaid	President of Estonia	2021
81	(Lithuania) Gitanas Nausėda	President of Lithuania	2022

==== By class ====
List of recipients by class
This article contains dynamic lists that may never be able to satisfy particular standards for completeness. You can help by editing the page to add missing items, with references to reliable sources.

1st Class
Collars

- Abdullah II of Jordan
- George Abela
- Valdas Adamkus
- Albert II of Belgium
- Albert II, Prince of Monaco
- Amha Selassie
- Teoctist Arăpașu
- Gloria Macapagal Arroyo
- Traian Băsescu
- Beatrix of the Netherlands
- Zine El Abidine Ben Ali
- Carl XVI Gustaf
- Jacques Chirac
- Carlo Azeglio Ciampi
- Emil Constantinescu
- Nicolae Corneanu
- Ion Dragalina
- Andrzej Duda
- Elizabeth II
- Matthew Festing
- Joachim Gauck
- Mihai Ghimpu
- Dalia Grybauskaitė
- Tarja Halonen
- Harald V of Norway
- Ioan Holender
- François Hollande
- Ion Iliescu
- Toomas Hendrik Ilves
- Jaber Al-Ahmad Al-Sabah
- Lech Kaczyński
- Andrej Kiska
- Thomas Klestil
- Émile Lahoud
- Margrethe II of Denmark
- Sergio Mattarella
- Michael I of Romania
- Giorgio Napolitano
- Nursultan Nazarbayev
- George Emil Palade
- Josef Šnejdárek
- Angelo Sodano
- Konstantinos Stephanopoulos
- Petar Stoyanov
- Hamad bin Khalifa Al Thani
- Gherman Titov
- Ezer Weizman

2nd Class
Grand Crosses

- Alois Lexa von Aehrenthal
- Martti Ahtisaari
- Yıldırım Akbulut
- Albert I of Belgium
- Archduke Albrecht, Duke of Teschen
- Prince Albert Victor, Duke of Clarence and Avondale
- Alexander III of Russia
- Alexander of Battenberg
- Alexandra, Countess of Frederiksborg
- Prince Alfons of Bavaria
- Alfred, 2nd Prince of Montenuovo
- Teoctist Arăpașu
- Count Kasimir Felix Badeni
- Ehud Barak
- Bartholomew I of Constantinople
- David Beatty, 1st Earl Beatty
- Kurt Beck
- Radu Beligan
- Silvio Berlusconi
- Andrew Bertie
- Birendra of Nepal
- Herbert von Bismarck
- Otto von Bismarck
- Albrecht von Boeselager
- Victor, Prince Napoléon
- Boutros Boutros-Ghali
- Josip Broz Tito
- Bernhard von Bülow
- Ernesto Burzagli
- Leo von Caprivi
- Prince Carl, Duke of Västergötland
- Carol I of Romania
- Charles, Prince of Wales
- Christian IX of Denmark
- Prince Christian of Schleswig-Holstein
- Doina Cornea
- Pat Cox
- Patriarch Diodoros of Jerusalem
- Bülent Ecevit
- Edmond de Gaiffier d'Hestroy
- Edward VII
- Ernest Louis, Grand Duke of Hesse
- Ernst I, Duke of Saxe-Altenburg
- Archduke Eugen of Austria
- Prince Eugen, Duke of Närke
- Laurent Fabius
- Felipe VI of Spain
- Ferdinand I of Romania
- Archduke Franz Ferdinand of Austria
- Franz Joseph I of Austria
- Frederick I, Duke of Anhalt
- Frederick III, German Emperor
- Prince Frederick of Hohenzollern-Sigmaringen
- Frederick William, Grand Duke of Mecklenburg-Strelitz
- Frederik VIII of Denmark
- Frederik, Crown Prince of Denmark
- Kurt Fricke
- Prince Friedrich Leopold of Prussia
- Prince Georg of Bavaria
- Agenor Maria Gołuchowski
- Dan Grigore
- Eremia Grigorescu
- Wilhelm von Hahnke
- Ionel Haiduc
- Tarja Halonen
- Rafic Hariri
- Prince Heinrich of Hesse and by Rhine
- Prince Henry of Prussia (1862–1929)
- Stefan Hell
- Henri, Grand Duke of Luxembourg
- Henrik, Prince Consort of Denmark
- Jaap de Hoop Scheffer
- Klaus Iohannis
- Mugur Isărescu
- Prince Joachim of Denmark
- Archduke Joseph Karl of Austria
- Lionel Jospin
- Jean-Claude Juncker
- Ioan Kalinderu
- Viatcheslav Moshe Kantor
- Karekin II
- Karl Anton, Prince of Hohenzollern
- Hüseyin Kıvrıkoğlu
- Konstantin of Hohenlohe-Schillingsfürst
- Aleksey Kuropatkin
- Aleksander Kwaśniewski
- Eugeniusz Kwiatkowski
- Chuan Leekpai
- Prince Leopold of Bavaria
- Leopold, Prince of Hohenzollern
- Liviu Librescu
- Louis IV, Grand Duke of Hesse
- Prince Ludwig Ferdinand of Bavaria
- Archduke Ludwig Viktor of Austria
- Luís I of Portugal
- Horia Macellariu
- Maria Teresa, Grand Duchess of Luxembourg
- Michael I of Romania
- Grand Duke Michael Alexandrovich of Russia
- Louis Michel
- Milan I of Serbia
- Helmuth von Moltke the Younger
- Louis Mountbatten, 1st Earl Mountbatten of Burma
- Hendrik Pieter Nicolaas Muller
- Valeriu Munteanu (politician)
- Adrian Năstase
- Nicholas II of Russia
- Mariana Nicolesco
- Olav V of Norway
- Archduke Otto of Austria (1865–1906)
- Queen Paola of Belgium
- Alexander August Wilhelm von Pape
- Pedro II of Brazil
- Maurice Pellé
- Göran Persson
- Nicolae Petrescu-Comnen
- Christian Poncelet
- Romano Prodi
- Mozaffar ad-Din Shah Qajar
- Antoni Wilhelm Radziwiłł
- Jean-Pierre Raffarin
- Archduke Rainer Ferdinand of Austria
- Ioan Rășcanu
- George Robertson, Baron Robertson of Port Ellen
- Gil Carlos Rodríguez Iglesias
- Prince Rudolf of Liechtenstein
- Rudolf, Crown Prince of Austria
- Rupprecht, Crown Prince of Bavaria
- Edward Rydz-Śmigły
- Gerhard Schröder
- Wolfgang Schüssel
- Walter Schwimmer
- Queen Silvia of Sweden
- Jagatjit Singh
- Pratap Singh of Idar
- Vassilios Skouris
- Queen Sofía of Spain
- Edmund Stoiber
- Jan Syrový
- Eduard Taaffe, 11th Viscount Taaffe
- Alfred von Tirpitz
- Alexandru Todea
- Ernest Troubridge
- Charles d'Ursel
- Victoria, Crown Princess of Sweden
- Grigore Vieru
- Charles J. Vopicka
- Rudolf Walden
- Georg Wassilko von Serecki
- Alan Watson, Baron Watson of Richmond
- Count Hans Weiss
- William, Prince of Hohenzollern
- William, Prince of Wied
- Sergei Witte
- August zu Eulenburg
- Adrian Zuckerman (attorney)

3rd Class
Grand Officers

- Dinu Adameșteanu
- Prince Dominique de La Rochefoucauld-Montbel
- Radu Aldulescu (musician)
- Ioan Arhip
- Constantin C. Arion
- Randolph L. Braham (Resigned)
- Gheorghe Brega
- Nicolae Cajal
- Alexandru Cernat
- Dietrich von Choltitz
- Gheorghe Cipăianu
- Liviu Ciulei
- Nadia Comăneci
- Ileana Cotrubaș
- Nicolae Dăscălescu
- Constantin Dumitrescu (general)
- Ivan Fichev
- Ismail of Johor
- Lucien Loizeau
- Marian-Jean Marinescu
- Lucian Pintilie
- Constantin Poenaru
- Dumitru Prunariu
- Ioan Mihail Racoviță
- Condoleezza Rice
- Constantin Sănătescu
- Hans-Georg von Seidel
- Alexandru Slătineanu
- Simion Stoilow
- Alexandru Tzigara-Samurcaș
- Gheorghe Vlădescu-Răcoasa
- Elie Wiesel
- Arthur Zimmermann
- Alexandru Zub

4th Class
Commanders

- Robert Aderholt
- Vasile Atanasiu
- Grigore Bălan
- James Berry (surgeon)
- Ion Boițeanu
- Randolph L. Braham
- Leonid Brezhnev
- Karl von Bülow
- Ronald L. Burgess Jr.
- Leopold Bürkner
- Ernesto Burzagli
- Ion Buzdugan
- Ben Cardin
- Nicolae Ciupercă
- Constantin Constantinescu-Claps
- Aurel Cosma
- Lucian Croitoru
- Salvator Cupcea
- Mircea Dinescu
- Eugen Doga
- Émile Dossin de Saint-Georges
- Mihai Drăgănescu
- Wim van Eekelen
- Ștefan Fălcoianu
- Nikolaus von Falkenhorst
- Angela Gheorghiu
- Hans Globke
- Maximilian Hacman
- Orrin Hatch
- Friedrich-Wilhelm Hauck
- Francis Howard (British Army officer, born 1848)
- Dietrich von Hülsen-Haeseler
- Sergěj Ingr
- Ron Johnson
- Hunor Kelemen
- Gunther Krichbaum
- Emil Krukowicz-Przedrzymirski
- Tadeusz Kutrzeba
- Alexandru Lapedatu
- Chris Lauzen
- Wolf Lepenies
- Charles W. Lyons
- Stanisław Maczek
- Solomon Marcus
- Valeriu Moldovan
- Vasile Moldoveanu
- Teodor Negoiță
- Devin Nunes
- Artur Phleps
- Tadeusz Piskor
- Karl von Plettenberg
- David Popescu
- Andrei Rădulescu
- Aristide Razu
- Mike Rogers (Alabama politician)
- Frank Rolleston
- Marco Rubio
- Nicolae Samsonovici
- Gustav von Senden-Bibran
- Ioanel Sinescu
- Ilie Șteflea
- Rudolf Stöger-Steiner von Steinstätten
- Anastase Stolojan
- Dejan Subotić
- Nicolae Tătăranu
- Rudolf Toussaint
- Alexandru Vulpe
- Jackie Walorski
- Bolesław Wieniawa-Długoszowski

5th Class
Officers

- Paul Alexiu
- Ilie Antonescu
- Petre Antonescu (general)
- Constantion Bădescu
- Ștefan Balaban
- Ioan A. Bassarabescu
- Constantin Brătescu
- Mihai Ciucă
- Constantin Climescu
- Mihail Corbuleanu
- Dumitru Coroamă
- Ilie Crețulescu
- Anton Crihan
- Constantin Cristescu
- Nicolae Dabija (soldier)
- Dumitru Dămăceanu
- Alexandru Dobriceanu
- Constantin Doncea
- Anton Durcovici
- Constantin Eftimiu
- Eremia Grigorescu
- Jan Karcz
- Radu Korne
- Dan Lupașcu
- Raoul Magrin-Vernerey
- Gheorghe Manoliu
- Sergiu Niță
- Alexandru Pastia
- Oana Pellea
- Irina Petrescu
- Artur Phleps
- Constantin Poenaru
- Iulian Pop
- David Praporgescu
- Nicolae Samsonovici
- Alexandru Șerbănescu
- Oleg Serebrian
- Constantin Tobescu

6th Class
Knights

- Ecaterina Andronescu
- Gheorghe Avramescu
- Constantin Bălăceanu-Stolnici
- Colin Robert Ballard
- Gelu Barbu
- Viorel P. Barbu
- Ion Besoiu
- Marcian Bleahu
- Mihai Brediceanu
- Nicolae Cambrea
- Scarlat Cantacuzino
- Ion Caramitru
- Szabolcs Cseh
- Nicolae Ciupercă
- Dina Cocea
- Titus Corlățean
- Pierre de Coubertin
- Corina Crețu
- Ioan Culcer
- Samuel C. Cumming
- Marțian Dan
- Neagu Djuvara
- Valer Dorneanu
- Mariana Drăgescu
- Tudor Gheorghe
- Marcel Guguianu
- Gheorghe Hagi
- Thomas Hunton
- Ernest Juvara
- Gabriel Liiceanu
- Leonard Mociulschi
- Ovidiu Iuliu Moldovan
- Iulia Motoc
- Marioara Murărescu
- Dan Nica
- Andrei Oișteanu
- Richard W. O'Neill
- Gabriel Oprea
- Octavian Paler
- Gică Petrescu
- Teodosie Petrescu
- David Popovici
- Dumitru Protase
- Colea Răutu
- Aristide Razu
- Mihai Șora
- Mihai Tănăsescu
- Radu Timofte
- László Tőkés (Withdrawn)
- Corneliu Vadim Tudor (Withdrawn)(2004 until 2007, when it was withdrawn)
- Petre Țuțea
- Virginia Zeani

Unknown Class

- Otto Adler
- Ilham Aliyev
- Petre Andrei
- Kofi Annan
- Gheorghe Arsenescu
- Giuseppe Arzilli
- Beatrix of the Netherlands
- Tarcisio Bertone
- Bhumibol Adulyadej
- Josef Bílý
- Volkan Bozkır
- Constantin Budișteanu
- George W. Bush
- Gheorghe Buzatu
- Mihail Cămărașu
- Fernando Henrique Cardoso
- Aníbal Cavaco Silva
- Marin Ceaușu
- Mauro Chiaruzzi
- Henri Cihoski
- Jack Corbu
- Paul de Smet de Naeyer
- Süleyman Demirel
- Radko Dimitriev
- Roman Dmowski
- Werner Ehrig
- Eddie Fenech Adami
- Alberto Fujimori
- Victor Gomoiu
- Árpád Göncz
- Kolinda Grabar-Kitarović
- Gheorghe Ionescu-Sisești
- Emmerich Jordan
- Juan Carlos I
- Mihail Kogălniceanu
- Stiliyan Kovachev
- Milan Kučan
- Leonid Kuchma
- Ricardo Lagos
- Ivan Loiko
- Mircea Lucescu
- Petru Lucinschi
- Ferenc Mádl
- Leon Malhomme
- Rexhep Meidani
- Stjepan Mesić
- Miron Mitrea
- Alois Mock
- Aleksander Piotr Mohl
- Maria Morganti
- Dumitru C. Moruzi
- Bolesław Mościcki
- Zayed bin Sultan Al Nahyan
- Danail Nikolaev
- Pietro Parolin
- Rosen Plevneliev
- Kazimierz Porębski
- Ștefan Procopiu
- Roberto Raschi
- Arnold Rüütel
- Said Halim Pasha
- Jorge Sampaio
- Eustachy Sapieha
- Marian Sârbu
- Rudolf Schuster
- Walter Staudinger
- Michel Suleiman
- Jan Szembek (diplomat)
- Păstorel Teodoreanu
- Nicolae Timofti
- Martin Unrein
- Guy Verhofstadt
- Vaira Vīķe-Freiberga
- Matei Vlădescu
- Harry Gideon Wells
- Walther Wenck
- Fritz Witt
- Valdis Zatlers
- Ferdynand Zarzycki
- Ernesto Zedillo

== See also ==
- List of military decorations
- National Decorations System (Romania)

== Sources ==
- (in Romanian) Ordinul național "Steaua României", Presidency of Romania website
- (in Romanian) Recipients of the order (Excel sheet), Presidency of Romania website
