= Jan Karcz =

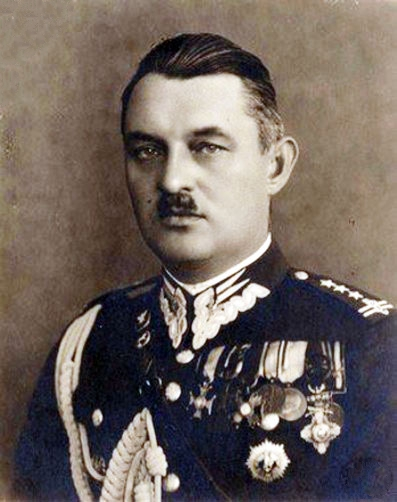
Jan Karcz military portrait

Jan Karcz (16 October 1892, in Modlica near Kraków – 25 January 1943, in Auschwitz) was a Polish Army colonel, posthumously promoted to the rank of a brigadier general. During the Second World War he was imprisoned and murdered in the Birkenau concentration camp, of Nazi Germany.

== Early life ==
Karcz was born in Modlnica on October 16, 1892, the son of Bartłomiej, a farmer, and Marianna Wojdył.

In 1912, after passing the baccalaureate in Krakow, he began his studies at the faculty of road and bridge construction at Lviv Polytechnic. Karcz graduated from the official cadet school for volunteers.

== First World War ==
In 1914 he was mobilized in the Imperial and Royal Austro-Hungarian Army. After graduating from the official sappers school at Krems an der Donau, as an ensign he then became a second lieutenant and fought on the Serbian and Italian front. In October 1918 Karcz was put on leave to complete his studies. He enlisted in the Polish army in November 1918. As a lieutenant he took part in the Polish-Ukrainian war, first in defense of Lviv and then as squadron commander of the 7 Pułk Ułanów Lubelskich (7th Lublin Uhlan Regiment) until February 1919. From February 1919 to September 1921 he commanded a squadron of the 7th Uhlan Regiment, fighting in the Polish-Soviet War. Karcz commanded a line squadron in the 1st Cavalry Regiment, and on April 13, 1920, he was promoted to the rank of captain. In July and August 1920 he served temporarily as commander of the 1st Cavalry Regiment. For his courage on the battlefield, Karcz was awarded the Silver Cross of the Order of Military Virtue and four times the Cross of Valor.

From September 1921 to July 1922 Karcz attended a course for squadron commanders at the Central Cavalry School of Grudziądz, after completing which he was promoted to major and became commander of a reserve squadron and then deputy commander of the 1 Pułk Szwoleżerów Józefa Piłsudskiego. In November 1925 he was appointed to the cavalry department of the Ministry of Military Affairs. In the years 1926-1928 Karcz was a student at the Warsaw War School. On October 31, 1928, after completing the course and obtaining the diploma of General Staff Officer, he was assigned to the 1st Infantry Regiment with the position of commander. In October 1931 Karcz became head of the cavalry department of the Ministry of Military Affairs in Warsaw. In April 1937 he assumed command of the cavalry brigade "Masovia".

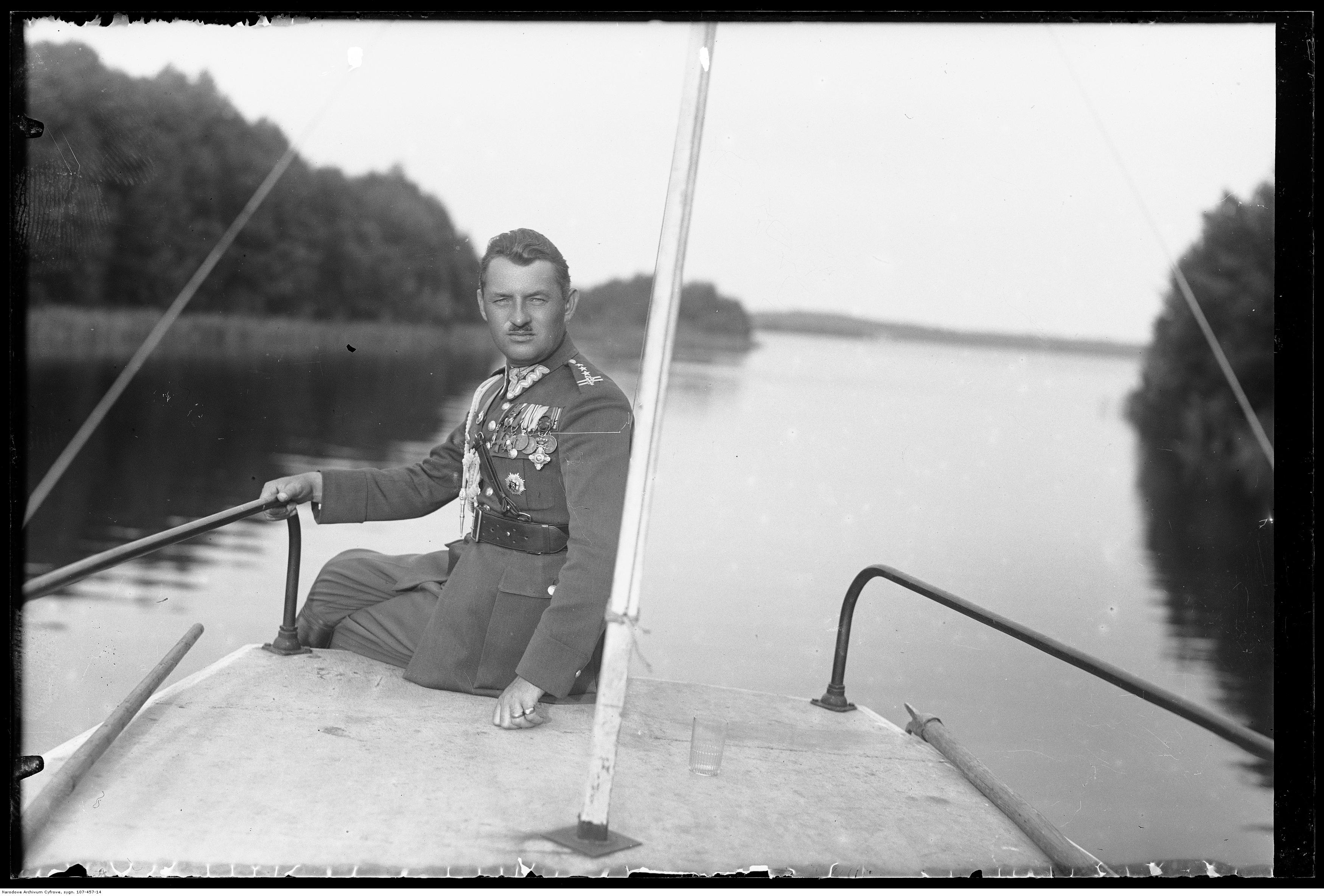
Celebrations of the 15th anniversary of the Battle of Krechowce. Narcyz Witczak-Witaczyński

== Second World War ==
In the September 1939 campaign, the cavalry brigade under his command fought to delay the advance of the Germans by operating as part of General Emil Krukowicz-Przedrzymirski's "Modlin" Army. According to the orders given by Krukowicz-Przedrzymirski, the brigade had to cover the 20th Infantry Division from the east in the advanced defensive position at Mława-Rzęgnowo, while at the same time carrying out reconnaissance of the German troops operating in this direction. In the face of strong pressure from enemy forces, the Brigade had to retreat towards Przasnysz, trying to maintain control of the Rudno Jeziorowe - hill 190.5 - Morawy Wielkie-Łazanie line for as long as possible. The unit took part in the defense of Mława, fighting in the area of Krzynowłoga Mała and Chorzele, as well as near Przasnysz, Pułtusk and Wyszków. The brigade ended combat operations on September 24 near Górecko Stare, where it was defeated after a bloody battle and then dispersed.

During the occupation of Poland Karcz devoted himself to the resistance (using the pseudonym "Jan"). He joined the Orła Białego Organization (Organization of the White Eagle) operating in Krakow, and with it he joined the Związek Walki Zbrojnej (Union for Armed Struggle) in Krakow. In early 1941 Karcz was randomly arrested during a round-up in Tarnów, being initially locked up in Lublin in the Castle prison.

== Auschwitz ==
Jan Karcz in Auschwitz, inmate number 23569

On November 27, 1941 he was taken to the Auschwitz-Birkenau concentration camp. Incarcerated as a Polish political prisoner (P.Pole) with registration number 23569, Karcz joined the Związek Organizacji Wojskowej, founded in the Auschwitz camp by Captain Witold Pilecki.

Karcz was probably reported to the camp Gestapo by a traitor in December 1941. After undergoing a cruel interrogation in the bunker of block 11, Karcz was transferred to the Birkenau concentration camp. There he founded the ZOW branch and directed it until January 1943. Its headquarters was an isolation hospital, which was largely avoided by SS men as prisoners suffering from typhus were locked up there. On January 23, 1943, Karcz reported to the Lagerführer Hans Aumeier, reporting that he had served his sentence of six months and asked to be transferred to the normal prison. That same day Karcz was locked in the bunker of block 11 and on January 25 he was taken to the Wall of Death and shot. His body was then burned in the crematorium furnace of the camp.

== Posthumous Promotion ==
On November 11, 1969, the president of the Republic of Poland in exile, August Zaleski, posthumously appointed him to the rank of brigadier general.

== Awards ==
- Virtuti Militari, Silver Medal
- Cross of Valour, four times
- Polonia Restituta, Officer Cross
- Cross of Merit, Golden Cross
- Order of the Star of Romania, Officer Cross
- Latvian Commemorative Medal
