= Zamość uprising =

Resistance operation during the Nazi occupation of Poland

- Part of Polish resistance movement in World War II and Polish-Ukrainian ethnic conflict
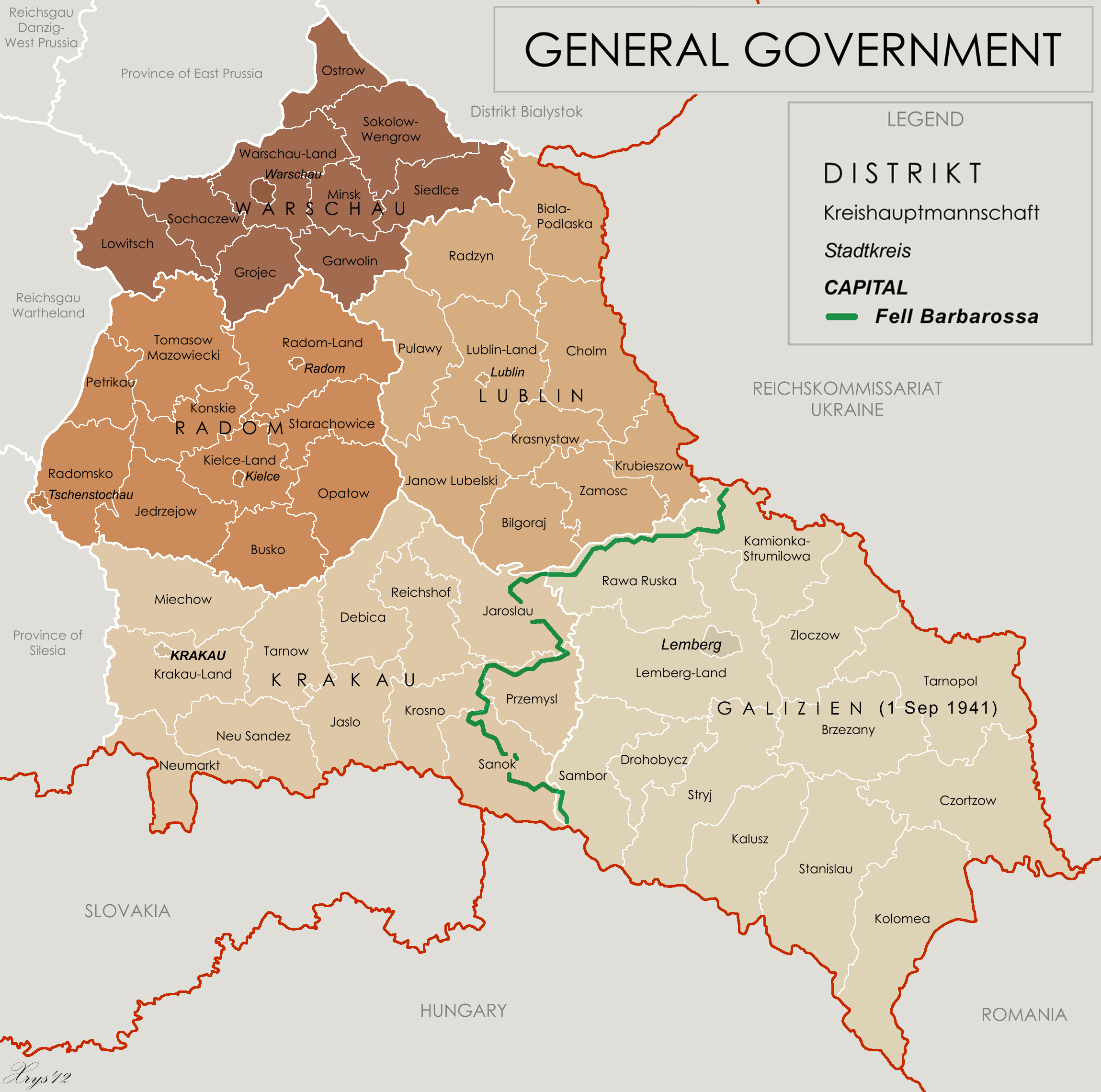
- Zamość region in Lublin District (brown, upper centre)
Date	1942 – 1944
Location	Zamość region (Lublin District, General Government)
Result	Polish victory

Belligerents
Germany: Ukrainian Auxiliary Police; Ukrainian Insurgent Army	Polish resistance: (Polish Underground State) Home Army; Peasants' Battalions; People's Guard; Supported by: (Soviet Union) Soviet partisans

Commanders and leaders
(Nazi Germany) Ernst Zörner; (Nazi Germany) Odilo Globocnik; Marian Łukasiewicz	Stanisław Basaj; Jerzy Mara-Meÿer ‡‡; Franciszek Bartłomowicz; (Polish Underground State) Konrad Bartoszewski; (Polish Underground State) Franciszek Krakiewicz; Grzegorz Korczyński; Antoni Paleń †; Umer Adamanov †; (Soviet Union) Wasyl Wołodin

Casualties and losses
Unknown	Unknown
- 110,000 Poles expelled from Zamojszczyzna of which 50,000 were sent to forced labour to Germany. 4,945 Polish children were kidnapped and sent to Germany for Germanisation. 4,465–4,484 Ukrainian civilians killed by Polish resistance in retaliatory for UPA's attacks on Poles.

The Zamość uprising comprised World War II partisan operations, 1942–1944, by the Polish resistance (primarily the Home Army and Peasant Battalions) against Germany's Generalplan-Ost forced expulsion of Poles from the Zamość region (Zamojszczyzna) and the region's colonization by German settlers.

The Polish defense of the Zamość region was one of Poland's largest resistance operations of World War II.

== German atrocities ==
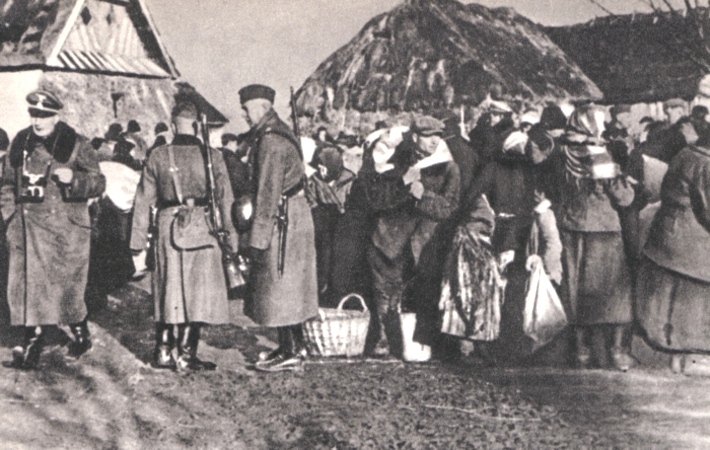
Expulsion of Poles from villages in Zamość region by SS, December 1942

In 1942, as part of Generalplan Ost, the Zamość region, with its fertile black soil, in the General Government, was chosen for further German colonisation. In fact the Zamość region expulsions and colonization can be considered the beginning of the large-scale implementation of the Generalplan Ost. The city itself was to be renamed "Himmlerstadt" (Himmler City), later changed to Pflugstadt (Plow City), which was to symbolise the German "plow" that was to "plow the East". The German occupiers had planned the relocation of at least 60,000 ethnic Germans to the area before the end of 1943. An initial "test trial" expulsion was performed in November 1941, and the whole operation ended in anti-partisan pacification operations combined with expulsions in June–July 1943 which were codenamed Wehrwolf Action I and II.

Over 110,000 Polish people from approximately 300 villages were expelled to make room for German (and to a lesser extent, Ukrainian) settlers as part of Nazi plans for establishment of German colonies in the conquered territories (Generalplan Ost). In the Warsaw or Lublin area some villagers were resettled, but about 50,000 of those expelled were sent as forced labour to Germany while others were sent to the Nazi concentration camps never to return. Some villages were simply razed and the inhabitants murdered.

4,454 Polish children were kidnapped by German authorities from their parents for potential Germanisation. Only 800 of them were found and sent back to Poland after World War II.

== Polish resistance ==
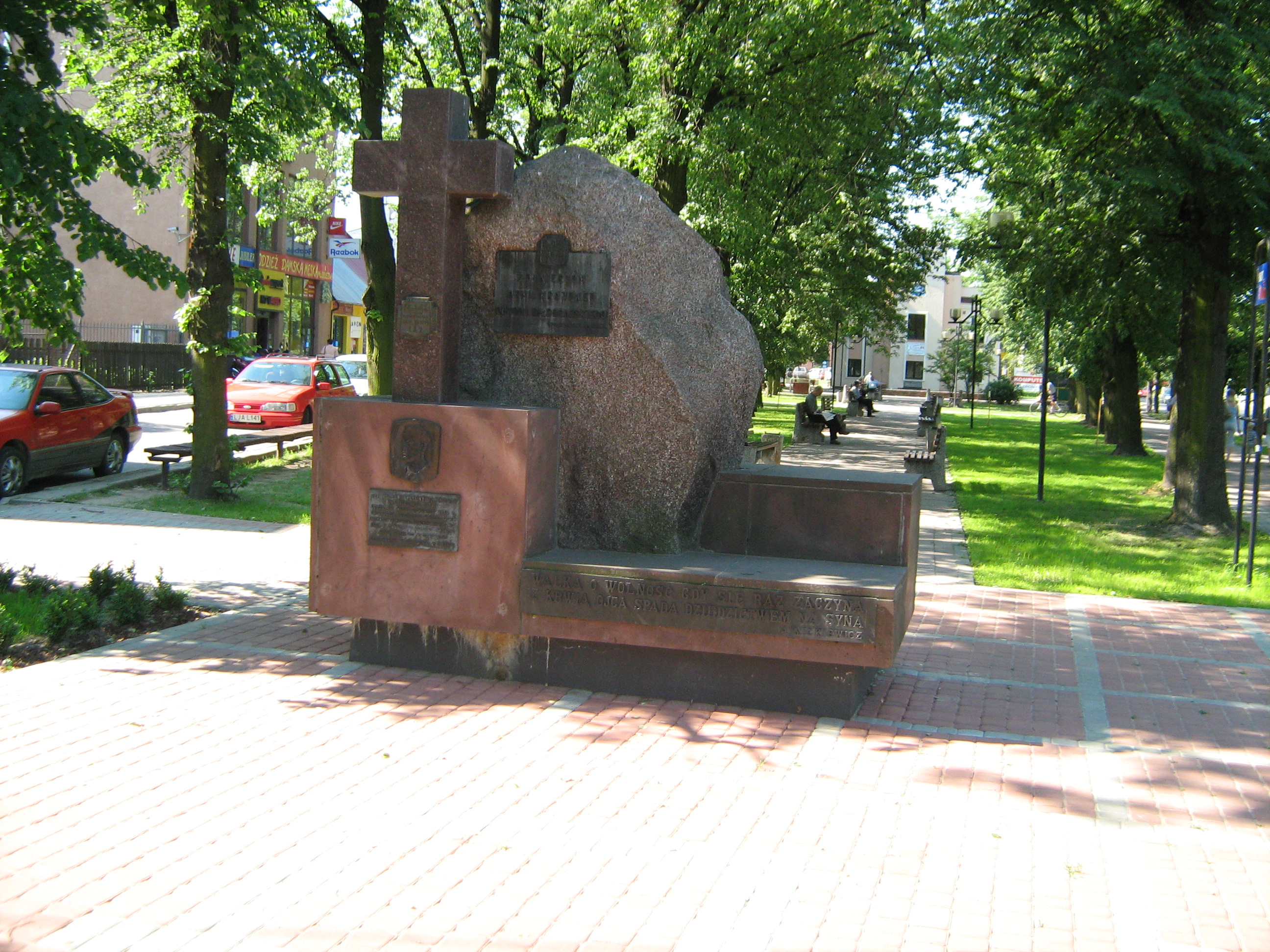
Monument to Polish Home Army insurgents, Biłgoraj

Local people resisted the action with great determination; they escaped into forests, organised self-defence, helped people who were expelled, and bribed kidnapped children out of German hands. Units of Polish resistance (primarily of Armia Krajowa and Bataliony Chłopskie) as well as elements of Soviet partisans and the Soviet-created Gwardia Ludowa helped to evacuate Polish civilians and assaulted German colonists and forces in the region. In December 1942 one of the first large partisan battles of World War II occurred in the region. The resistance forces numbered several thousand forest fighters. The first phase of the resistance took place from December 1942 to February 1943; the Germans then lessened their activities for a few months but counter-attacked in June, with major anti-partisan actions and terror directed against the civilian population (Aktion Wehrwolf).

After several battles between the partisans and the German units (the most notable being the battles of Wojda, Róża, Zaboreczno, Długi Kąt, Lasowce and Hrubieszów as well as the Battle of Osuchy), the Germans had to halt the action and in the end very few German settlers were brought to the area. Until the middle of 1943, the Germans managed to settle 9,000 colonists, and an additional 4,000 until the end of 1943. The increasing harassment from the partisans meant that the Germans began to lose the control of the region in the spring of 1943.

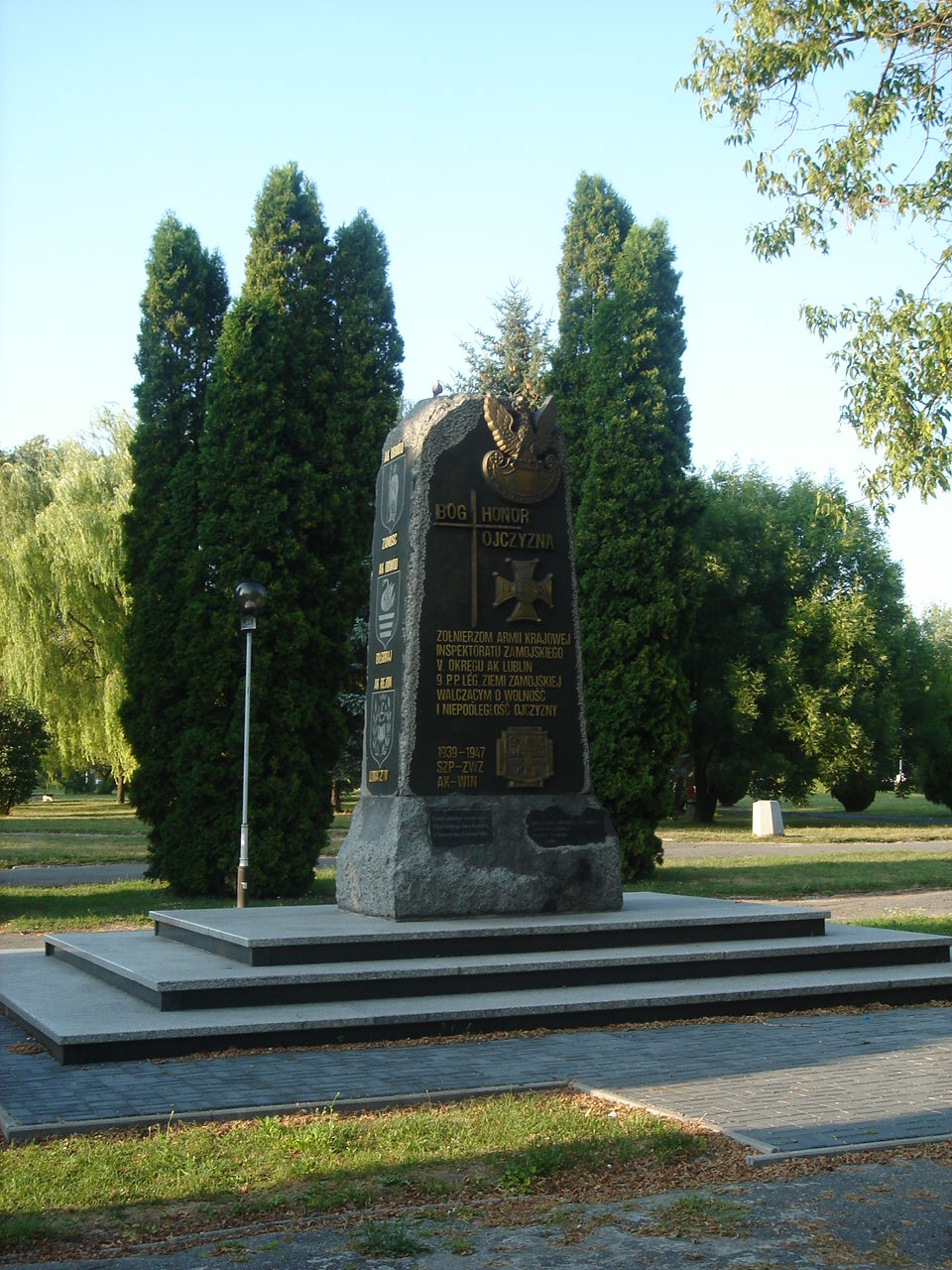
Home Army monument, Zamość

In the first half of 1944, Polish civilians and the Polish resistance were also attacked by Ukrainian units of the Ukrainian Insurgent Army (see massacres of Poles in Volhynia). In response, Poles carried out several dozen reprisals against the Ukrainian population, killing 4,465–4,484 of them, 45% of whom were murdered during the Hrubieszów Revolution. Nonetheless, by the summer of 1944 the Polish partisans, based in the large forests of the region, had taken control of most of the countryside, limiting German control to the major towns. In the summer of 1944 Germans again initiated major anti-partisan operations (Sturmwind I and Sturmwind II) which resulted in the battle of Osuchy (one of the largest battles between the Polish resistance and Nazi Germany), with the insurgents sustaining heavy casualties. However, soon afterwards, in July, the remaining Polish units took part in the nationwide Operation Tempest and managed to liberate several towns and villages in the Zamość region. The Germans, pressured by the advancing Red Army, were forced to abandon the region.

== Remembrance ==
Several monuments, museums and cemeteries have been raised in the area over time. In the People's Republic of Poland the actions of the Soviet-sponsored and created Gwardia Ludowa and Armia Ludowa entities were emphasized at the expense of those of the other resistance. A recent Polish documentary dedicated to the uprising has been recognized in the New York Festivals of 2008 with a bronze medal.

== See also ==
- Polish areas annexed by Nazi Germany
- Ethnic cleansing of Zamojszczyzna by Nazi Germany
- Operation Tannenberg
- Pacifications of villages in German-occupied Poland
- Nazi crimes against the Polish nation
