= Stanisławów, Biłgoraj County =

Stanisławów
- Village
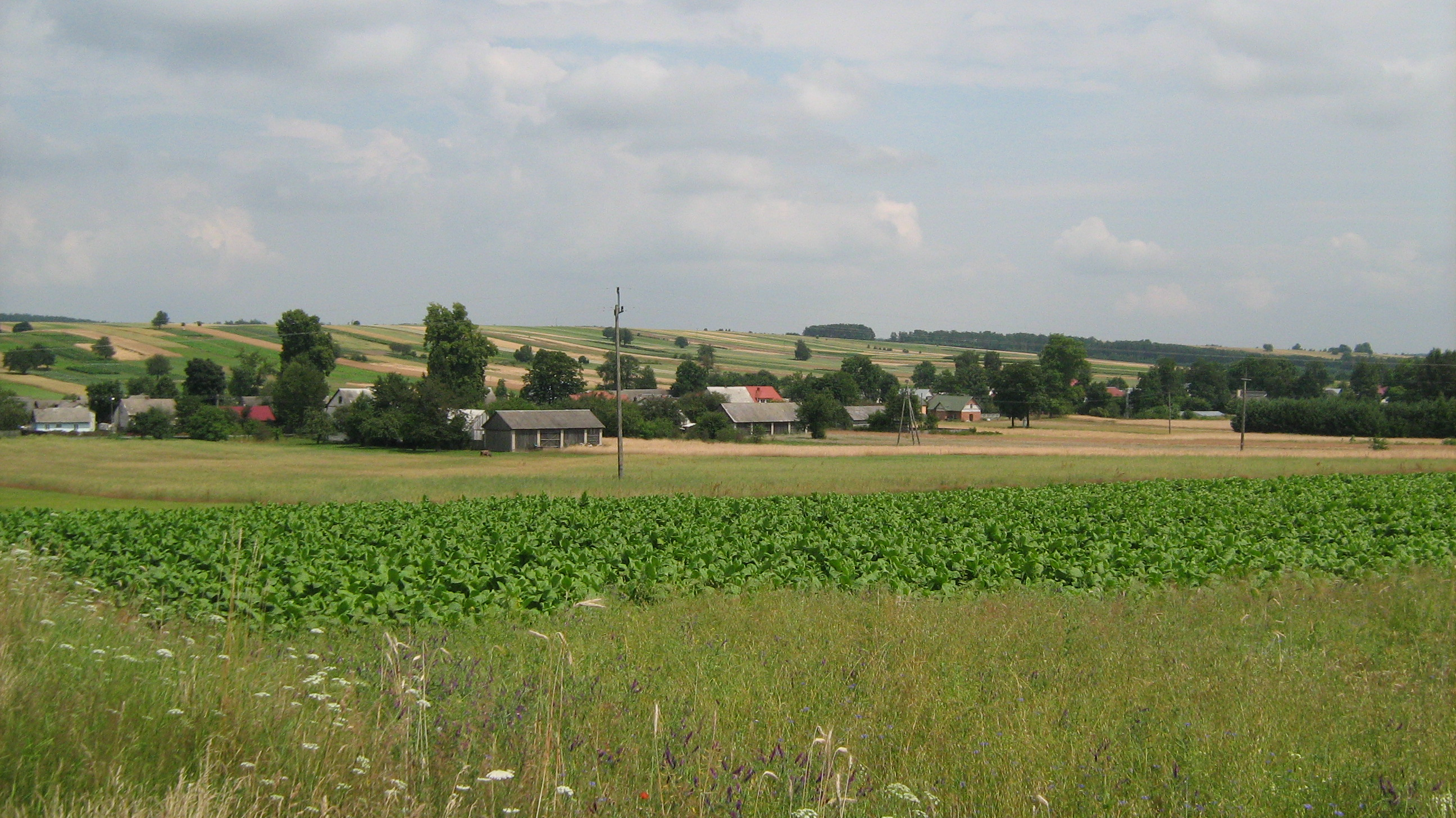

- Location within Poland
- Coordinates: 50°32′N 23°7′E
- Country: Poland
- Voivodeship: Lublin
- County: Biłgoraj
- Gmina: Józefów

Population
  - Total: 655
- Time zone: UTC+1 (CET)
  - Summer (DST): UTC+2 (CEST)
- Vehicle registration: LBL

Stanisławów [staniˈswavuf] is a village in the administrative district of Gmina Józefów, within Biłgoraj County, Lublin Voivodeship, in eastern Poland.

== History ==
38 Polish citizens were murdered by Nazi Germany in the village during World War II.
