= Tarnowola =

- Village
- Location within Poland
- Coordinates: 50°30′N 23°1′E
- Country: Poland
- Voivodeship: Lublin
- County: Biłgoraj
- Gmina: Józefów

Population
  - Total: 134

Tarnowola [tarnɔˈvɔla] is a village in the administrative district of Gmina Józefów, within Biłgoraj County, Lublin Voivodeship, in eastern Poland.
