= Constantin Poenaru =

Romanian general

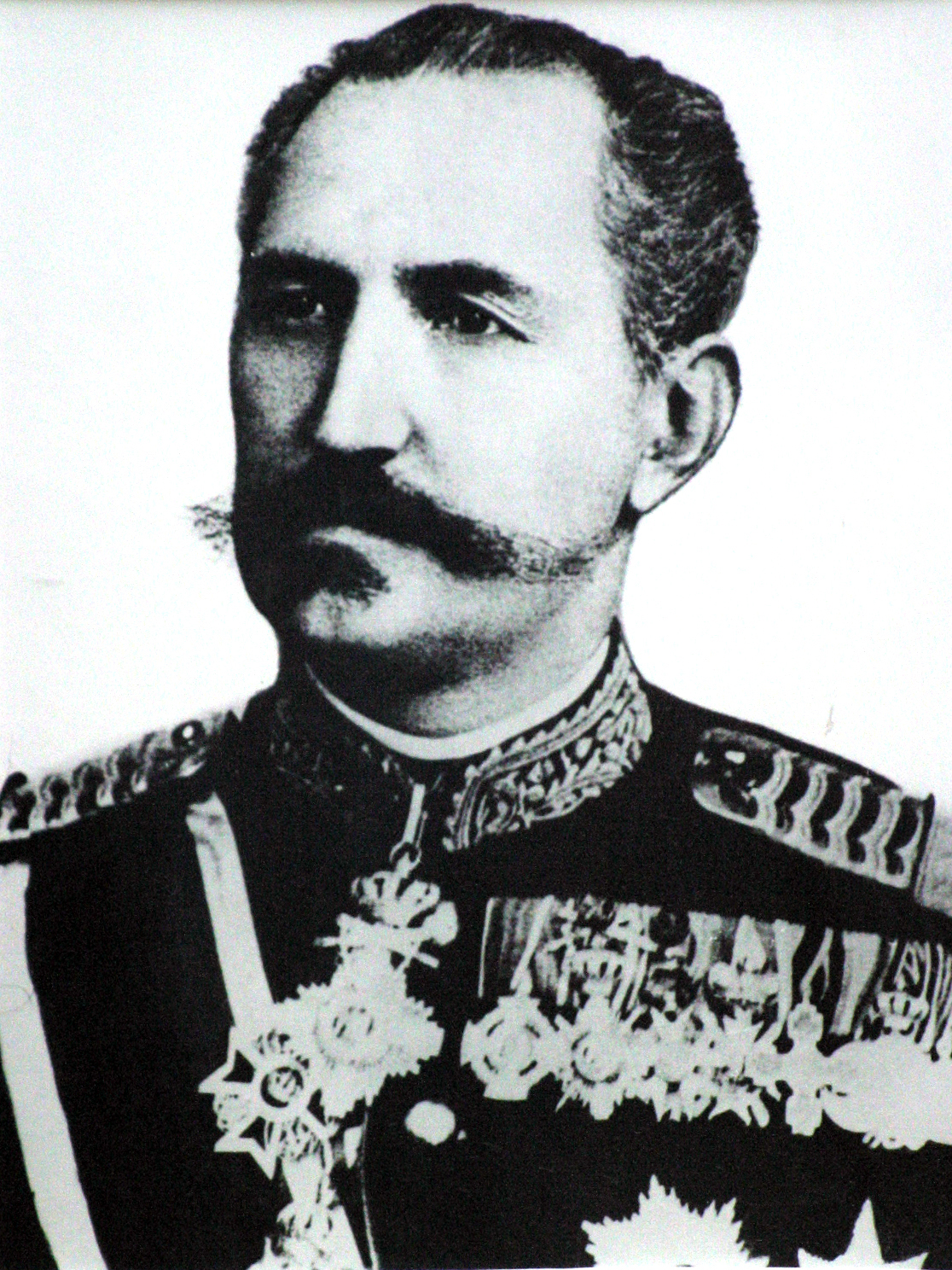
- Born: April 8, 1842; Bucharest, Wallachia
- Died: 1912 (aged 69–70); Bucharest, Kingdom of Romania
- Education: École supérieure de guerre
- Military career
- Allegiance: Romania
- Branch: Army
- Rank: division general
- Conflicts: Romanian War of Independence
- Awards: Order of the Crown (Romania); Order of the Star of Romania; Order of the Cross of Takovo; Order of Saint Anna

25th Minister of War of Kingdom of Romania
- In office 12 June 1894 – 3 October 1895
- Prime Minister: Lascăr Catargiu
- Preceded by: Lascăr Catargiu
- Succeeded by: Constantin I. Stoicescu

10th Chief of the Romanian General Staff
- In office 1 October 1898 – 1 April 1901
- Monarch: Carol I
- Prime Minister: Dimitrie Sturdza; Gheorghe Grigore Cantacuzino; Petre P. Carp; Dimitrie Sturdza
- Preceded by: Constantin Barozzi
- Succeeded by: Alexandru Cărcăleteanu

Constantin Poenaru (April 8, 1842–1912) was a Romanian general.

Born in Bucharest, Poenaru attended the local officers’ school from 1859 to 1861, followed by the École supérieure de guerre in Paris. A second lieutenant from 1861, he rose to captain in 1867 and to major in 1872, and commanded the military engineers’ battalion from 1872 to 1877. When the Romanian War of Independence broke out in 1877, he saw action during the Siege of Plevna. Gheorghe Șonțu and Valter Mărăcineanu were under his command.

In 1880, Poenaru was promoted to lieutenant colonel, and he became inspector of military engineers. In 1882, he was made commander of the first engineers’ regiment in the Romanian Army. In 1884, he was placed in charge of the officers’ school. Promoted to colonel in 1886 and to brigadier general in 1891, he headed an army corps from 1896. He taught strategy both at the officers’ academy and at the Higher War School. In June 1894 he became War Minister, serving until October 1895. Together with Iacob Lahovary, Chief of the Romanian General Staff, he pursued institutional reform, modernizing the army's structure and cementing the special status of the general staff.

From 1898 to 1901, Poenaru, from 1900 a division general, himself served as General Staff Chief, with Lahovary as War Minister. The two continued to collaborate, with Poenaru focused on updating mobilization plans and battle regulations. He also drew up plans for an eventual occupation of Austro-Hungarian ruled Transylvania, foreseeing a vigorous offensive from multiple directions. Finally, in the interests of monitoring the border with Austria-Hungary, he detached infantry battalions to the mountain passes of the Carpathians.

Poenaru was awarded the Order of the Crown, commander, grand officer and grand cross; the Order of the Star of Romania, officer and grand officer; the Order of the Cross of Takovo; and the Order of Saint Anna.
