= Czarny Las-Kolonia =

- Village
- Location within Poland
- Coordinates: 50°29′N 23°9′E
- Country: Poland
- Voivodeship: Lublin
- County: Biłgoraj
- Gmina: Józefów

Population
  - Total: 45

Czarny Las-Kolonia [ˈt͡ʂarnɨ ˈlas kɔˈlɔɲa] is a village in the administrative district of Gmina Józefów, within Biłgoraj County, Lublin Voivodeship, in eastern Poland.
