= Borowina, Biłgoraj County =

Borowina
- Village
- Location within Poland
- Coordinates: 50°29′40″N 23°2′47″E
- Country: Poland
- Voivodeship: Lublin
- County: Biłgoraj
- Gmina: Józefów

Population
  - Total: 233

Borowina [bɔrɔˈvina] is a village in the administrative district of Gmina Józefów, within Biłgoraj County, Lublin Voivodeship, in eastern Poland.
