= Górecko Kościelne =

- Village
- Location within Poland
- Coordinates: 50°31′N 22°58′E
- Country: Poland
- Voivodeship: Lublin
- County: Biłgoraj
- Gmina: Józefów
- Elevation: 225 m (738 ft)

Population
  - Total: 44

Górecko Kościelne [ɡuˈrɛt͡skɔ kɔɕˈt͡ɕɛlnɛ] is a village in the administrative district of Gmina Józefów, within Biłgoraj County, Lublin Voivodeship, in eastern Poland.
