= Samsonówka =

- Village
- Location within Poland
- Coordinates: 50°29′12″N 23°6′5″E
- Country: Poland
- Voivodeship: Lublin
- County: Biłgoraj
- Gmina: Józefów

Population
  - Total: 254

Samsonówka [samsɔˈnufka] is a village in the administrative district of Gmina Józefów, within Biłgoraj County, Lublin Voivodeship, in eastern Poland.
