= Majdan Kasztelański =

- Village
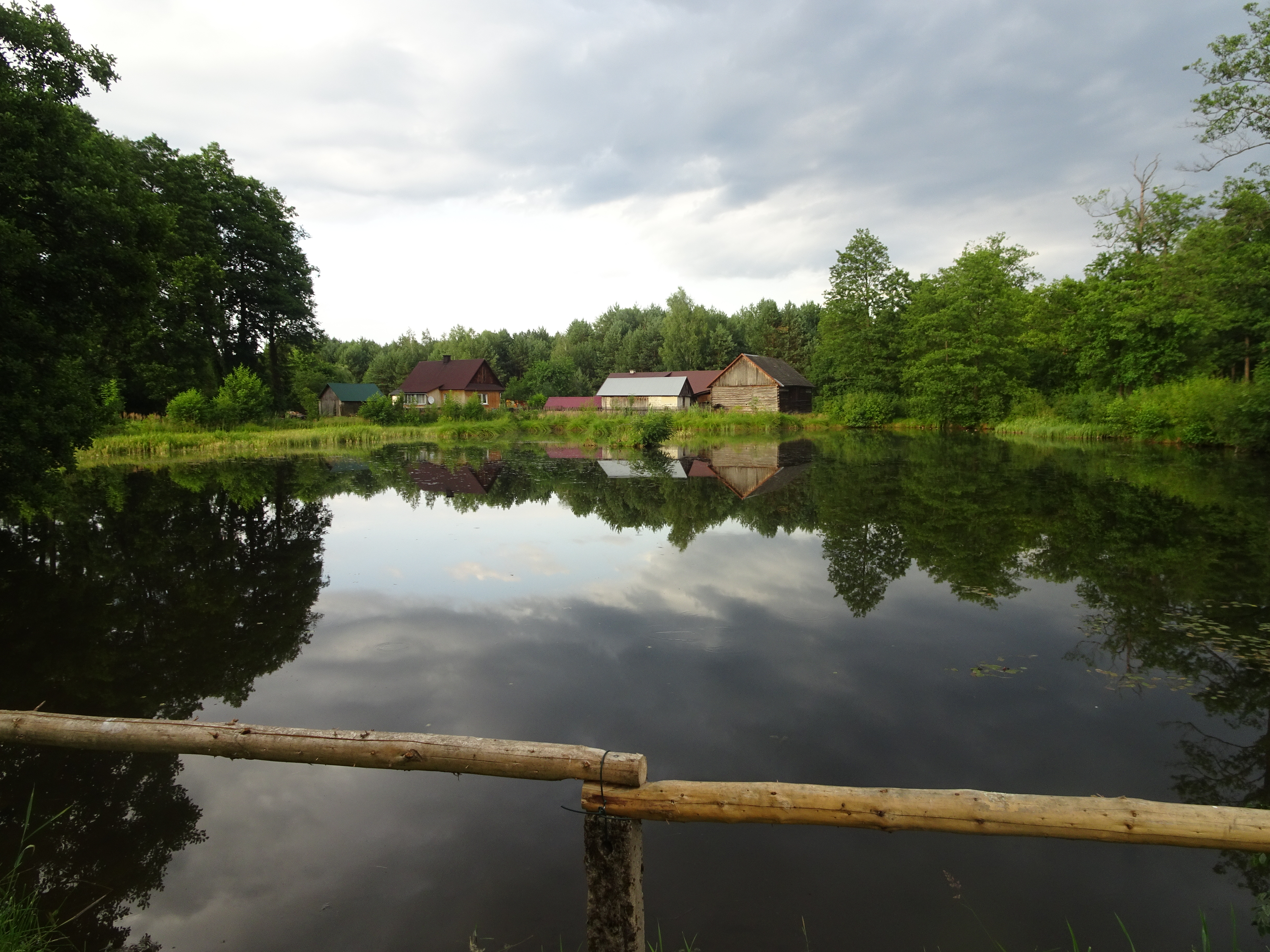

- Location within Poland
- Coordinates: 50°32′N 23°1′E
- Country: Poland
- Voivodeship: Lublin
- County: Biłgoraj
- Gmina: Józefów

Population
  - Total: 159
- Time zone: UTC+1 (CET)
  - Summer (DST): UTC+2 (CEST)

Majdan Kasztelański (Polish pronunciation: [ˈmajdaŋ kaʂtɛˈlaj̃skʲi]) is a village in the administrative district of Gmina Józefów, within Biłgoraj County, Lublin Voivodeship, in eastern Poland.

== History ==
Six Polish citizens were murdered by Nazi Germany in the village during World War II.
