= Brzeziny, Biłgoraj County =

Brzeziny
- Village
- Location within Poland
- Coordinates: 50°31′N 23°0′E
- Country: Poland
- Voivodeship: Lublin
- County: Biłgoraj
- Gmina: Józefów

Population
  - Total: 168

Brzeziny [bʐɛˈʑinɨ] is a village in the administrative district of Gmina Józefów, within Biłgoraj County, Lublin Voivodeship, in eastern Poland.
