= Majdan Nepryski =

- Village
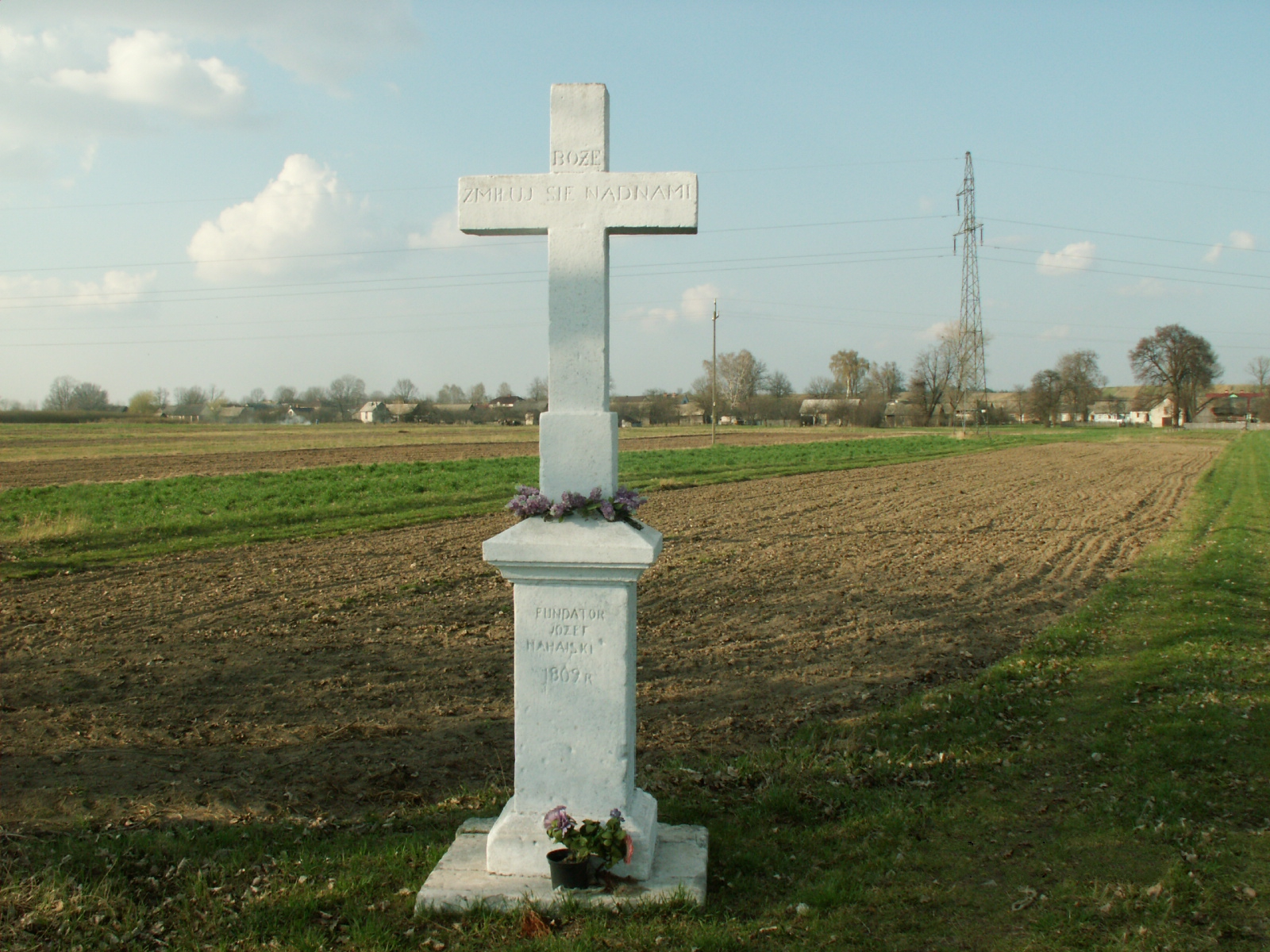
- Wayside cross in Majdan Nepryski

- Location within Poland
- Coordinates: 50°30′N 23°5′E
- Country: Poland
- Voivodeship: Lublin
- County: Biłgoraj
- Gmina: Józefów

Population
  - Total: 755
- Time zone: UTC+1 (CET)
  - Summer (DST): UTC+2 (CEST)

Majdan Nepryski (Polish pronunciation: [ˈmajdan nɛˈprɨskʲi]) is a village in the administrative district of Gmina Józefów, within Biłgoraj County, Lublin Voivodeship, in eastern Poland.

== History ==
Seven Polish citizens were murdered by Nazi Germany in the village during World War II.
