= Siedliska, Biłgoraj County =

Siedliska
- Village
- Location within Poland
- Coordinates: 50°28′52″N 23°5′54″E
- Country: Poland
- Voivodeship: Lublin
- County: Biłgoraj
- Gmina: Józefów

Population
  - Total: 267

Siedliska [ɕɛdˈlʲiska] is a village in the administrative district of Gmina Józefów, within Biłgoraj County, Lublin Voivodeship, in eastern Poland.
