= Aristide Razu =

Romanian general

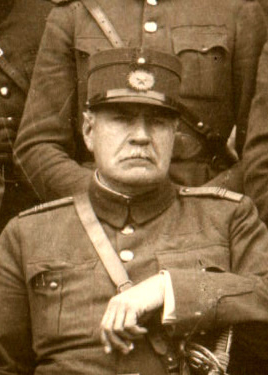
General Aristide Razu, c.1928

Aristide Razu, CB, (7 March 1868 – 1950) was a Romanian divisional general, commander of the Romanian 22nd Infantry Division in the 1916 Romanian Campaign against the Central Powers, and of the Romanian 5th Infantry Division during the Battle of Mărășești, 6–19 August 1917, in World War I.

== Biography ==
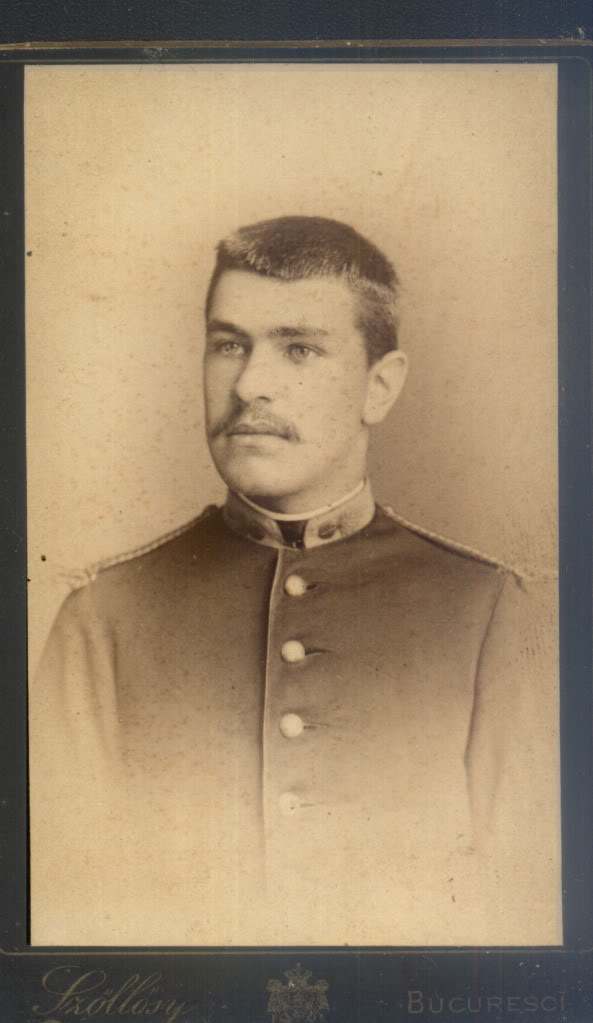
Captain Aristide Razu, around 1900

Razu was born on 7 March 1868 in the City of Cahul, Bessarabia Governorate as Aristarh (Aristide) Razu, to Aristide Razu, a physician and later the mayor of Târgu Ocna, and Clara Razu, born Krupensky; he was baptized in the Orthodox religion. He finished his studies at the University of Liège on 18 October 1895 with a degree in electrical engineering. After returning to Romania he attended the Higher War School. On June 15, 1902, he married Margareta Mandrea, daughter of Judge Nicolae Mandrea and Zoe, née Bălcescu (the daughter of Barbu Bălcescu). From 1910 to 1913 he served as a military attaché of Romania in Istanbul, Turkey. In 1914 he was appointed commander of the 8th Infantry Regiment in Buzău.

During the First World War, Razu served as commander of the 22nd Infantry Division in the 1916 campaign, then as commander of the 5th Infantry Division in the 1917 campaign, and finally as commander of the 1st Army Corps in 1918. In 1918 he also served as General Secretary of the Army.

In 1925 he was appointed Inspector General at the Ministry of Defense, a position from which he was transferred to the reserve in 1928. He died in Bucharest in 1950.

== Awards ==
- Order of the Crown (Romania), Knight rank (1900)
- Order of the Star of Romania, Knight rank (1912)
- Order of the Crown (Romania), Commander rank, with spades and Military Virtue Medal ribbon (May 23, 1918)
- Order of the Star of Romania, Commander rank, with spades (July 28, 1918)
- Order of the Bath, Honorary Companion class (September 30, 1920)

== Works ==
- Conferințe de fortificațiune pasageră ținute de Căpitanul A. Razu gradelor inferioare de infanterie care au urmat școala practică de lucrări de campanie, la Regimentul 1 Geniu, în anii 1900 și 1901, ed. II. revăzută, Tipografia Regimentului 1 Geniu Bucuresci, 1901.
- Conferințe de semnalisare ținute de Căpitanul A. Razu oficerilor și gradelor inferioare cari au urmat școala practică de lucrări de campanie în tabăra de la Schitul-Golești, în vara anului 1900, sub direcțiunea superioară a Colonelului Ioan Culcer, Comandantul Regimentului 1 Geniu, ed. II revăzută, Tipografia Regimentului 1 Geniu Bucuresci, 1901.
- Cursul de fortificațiune. Vol. I. Părțile III-IV. Organizarea forturilor și constituirea și organizarea cetăților permanente, întocmit și predat de căpitanul de geniu Aristide Razu, professor ajutor sub direcțiunea Maiorului Sc. Panaitescu, professor. Autografia Școalelor militare de Artilerie și Geniu, București, 1903.
- Manual de telegrafie și telefonie pentru campaniile de telegrafie. Cu un atlas cuprinzând 20 foi, lucrat de Căpitanul A. Razu din Geniu. Institutul de Arte Grafice, Carol Göbl, Bucuresci, 1899.
- Anexa la Manualul de telegrafie și telefonie, lucrat de Căpitanul A. Razu din Geniu Institutul de Arte Grafice, Carol Göbl, Bucuresci, 1903
