= Florianka =

- Village
- Location within Poland
- Coordinates: 50°33′12″N 22°58′54″E
- Country: Poland
- Voivodeship: Lublin
- County: Biłgoraj
- Gmina: Józefów

Florianka [flɔˈrjanka] is a village in the administrative district of Gmina Józefów, within Biłgoraj County, Lublin Voivodeship, in eastern Poland.
