= Walter Staudinger =

SS-Obergruppenführer, (1898–1964

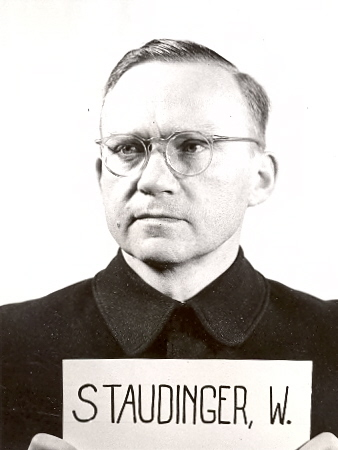
- Wilhelm Staudinger as a witness during the Nuremberg Trials
- Born: 24 January 1898; Munich, Kingdom of Bavaria, German Empire
- Died: 31 August 1964 (aged 66); Munich, West Germany
- Military career
- Allegiance: German Empire; Weimar Republic; Nazi Germany
- Branch: Imperial German Army; Reichsheer; Waffen-SS
- Rank: SS-Obergruppenführer
- Conflicts: World War I World War II
- Awards: German Cross in gold Iron Cross, 1st class Clasp to the Iron Cross, 2nd class

Walter Staudinger (24 January 1898 – 31 August 1964) was a German police official and an SS-Gruppenführer and Generalleutnant of the Waffen SS. He was an artillery commander during the Second World War and, after the end of the war, was interned by the Allies until 1948.

== Early life and World War I ==
Walter Staudinger's father, August Staudinger was a master bookbinder. Staudinger had a younger brother, Raimund (1900–1943). In Munich, he attended Luitpold Gymnasium. After the start of World War I, he volunteered in January 1915, enlisting in the Royal Bavarian 7th Infantry Regiment “Prince Leopold”. He attended military training for six months. In the summer of 1915, he was transferred to the 10th Bavarian Mountain Battery of the 6th Royal Bavarian Landwehr Division. Staudinger fought on both the western and eastern fronts. He took part in the Battle of Verdun and the battles for the Red Tower Pass. After an officer training course in the spring of 1918, he was sent to the replacement division of the Royal Bavarian 9th Field Artillery Regiment, where he remained until the end of the war. In mid-December 1918 he was discharged from the army with the rank of Leutnant in the reserves.

== Interwar period ==
On 15 December 1918 he entered the police force and initially served in the war usury office in Munich. In the spring of 1919 he also joined the Freikorps. During the Kapp Putsch coup in March 1920, he volunteered in the Reichswehr. In 1920, he began employment at the Munich police headquarters. He joined the Nazi Party in 1920 and, as an early adherent, gained the status of an Alter Kämpfer. In November 1923, he took part in the Hitler's Beer Hall Putsch as a member of the Munich Kampfbund, and was later awarded the Blood Order. After the coup, he was temporarily suspended from police duty. He then left the Party, as continued membership would have jeopardized his police career. Following the Nazi seizure of power, he rejoined it in May 1933 with (membership number 3,201,960).

With Hitler and Nazi Party in power, in April 1933, he worked for two months as a presidential secretary in the Munich police headquarters. In June 1933 he became a police captain and adjutant to the Chief of Police, SA-Obergruppenführer August Schneidhuber. In 1933, he joined the National Socialist People's Welfare and the Reichskolonialbund (Reich Colonial Association).

In November 1934, Staudinger joined the Schutzstaffel (SS number 242,652) and was transferred to Berlin. There joined the staff of the Reichsführer-SS, and in 1934 he was briefly the adjutant to Heinrich Himmler. He then became the adjutant to Sicherheitsdienst chief Reinhard Heydrich. Part of his duties was head of motor vehicle officers of the Gestapo. From 16 October 1935 to September 1939, Staudinger became the head of Department IV (technical department) at the Gestapo office in Berlin, responsible for all motor vehicle, aviation, communications and technical weapons. From August 1936 to September 1939, he also was head of Section V9 in the Administration and Law Office of the Main Office of the Security Police. From August to September 1939, he also headed Group K in the command office of the Ordnungspolizei in the Hauptamt Sicherheitspolizei (Security Police Main Office).

== World War II ==
As World War II started, he completed an artillery training course and was accepted into the SS-Verfügungstruppe troops. Starting in October 1939, he was commander of the II SS artillery division in Munich and then from April 1940 commander of the IV light artillery division. Next with the SS artillery regiment of 1st SS Panzer Division Leibstandarte SS Adolf Hitler. From April to June 1943, he was a member of the deployment staff of the I SS Panzer Corps, where he was deployed as an artillery commander from July 1943 to October 1944. In August 1944, he was injured in combat and hospitalized until December 1944. From October 1944 to May 1945, he was Higher Artillery Commander in the 6th Panzer Army.

== Post-war ==
At the end of the war, Staudinger was captured and was interned in Salzburg on 11 May 1945. He testified on behalf of Sepp Dietrich, to whom he was subordinate during the war, at the Malmedy massacre trial, a component of the Dachau trials conducted by a U.S. military tribunal. Dietrich was convicted of war crimes, received a life sentence but was released from prison on 22 October 1955. After Staudinger's denazification, he was released from the internment hospital in Garmisch at the end of April 1948. He then moved back to Munich and worked for the Sebastian Schramm company, a photographic agency and school from May to November 1948. In 1949, he was unemployed for a year.

In 1951, the Gehlen Organization (OG) collected information about the various soldiers' associations, especially right-wing extremist organizations. Information about former leaders of the Waffen-SS was also recorded and evaluated. In a report by the OG in April 1951, Staudinger was classified as a prominent representative of the Waffen-SS, along with seven other former high-ranking officers, including Otto Skorzeny, Gunter d'Alquen, Karl Maria Demelhuber, Paul Hausser and Felix Steiner. According the report, Staudinger was considered a leading figure in Munich SS circles, as a representative of Germany's neutrality policy and a sharp critic of Johann von Kielmansegg, Hans Speidel and Hans Oster because of their attitude toward the 20 July plot on Hitler. The report also noted that Staudinger and his Munich comrades had positioned themselves within the former Waffen-SS leadership against Skorzeny and Steiner, but on the more moderate side of Hausser. Staudinger, married Elsa Schmidt in April 1923 and is the father of two daughters. He died in August 1964 of heart failure.

== Ranks ==
Waffen-SS and police ranks
Date	Rank
October 1939	SS-Sturmbannführer der SS-Verfügungstruppe
May 1940	SS-Obersturmbannführer der Waffen-SS
September 1940	Oberstleutnant der Schutzpolizei
January 1941	SS-Standartenführer der Waffen-SS
October 1942	SS-Oberführer der Waffen-SS
June 1943	SS-Brigadeführer und Generalmajor der Waffen-SS
November 1944	SS-Gruppenführer und Generalleutnant der Waffen-SS

== Awards ==
Awards:

- German Cross in Gold (1942)
- Iron Cross 1st Class (1940)
- Iron Cross 2nd class (1917) with clasp (1940)
- Medal Winter Battle in the East 1941/42 (1942)
- Star of Romania with swords on the ribbon of the Order of Military Virtue III. Class (Commander's Cross) (1942)
- Bulgarian Order of Valor III. Class, 1st level (1942)

== See also ==
- Register of SS leaders in general's rank
