= Gmina Józefów =

Gmina Józefów Józefów Commune
- Gmina
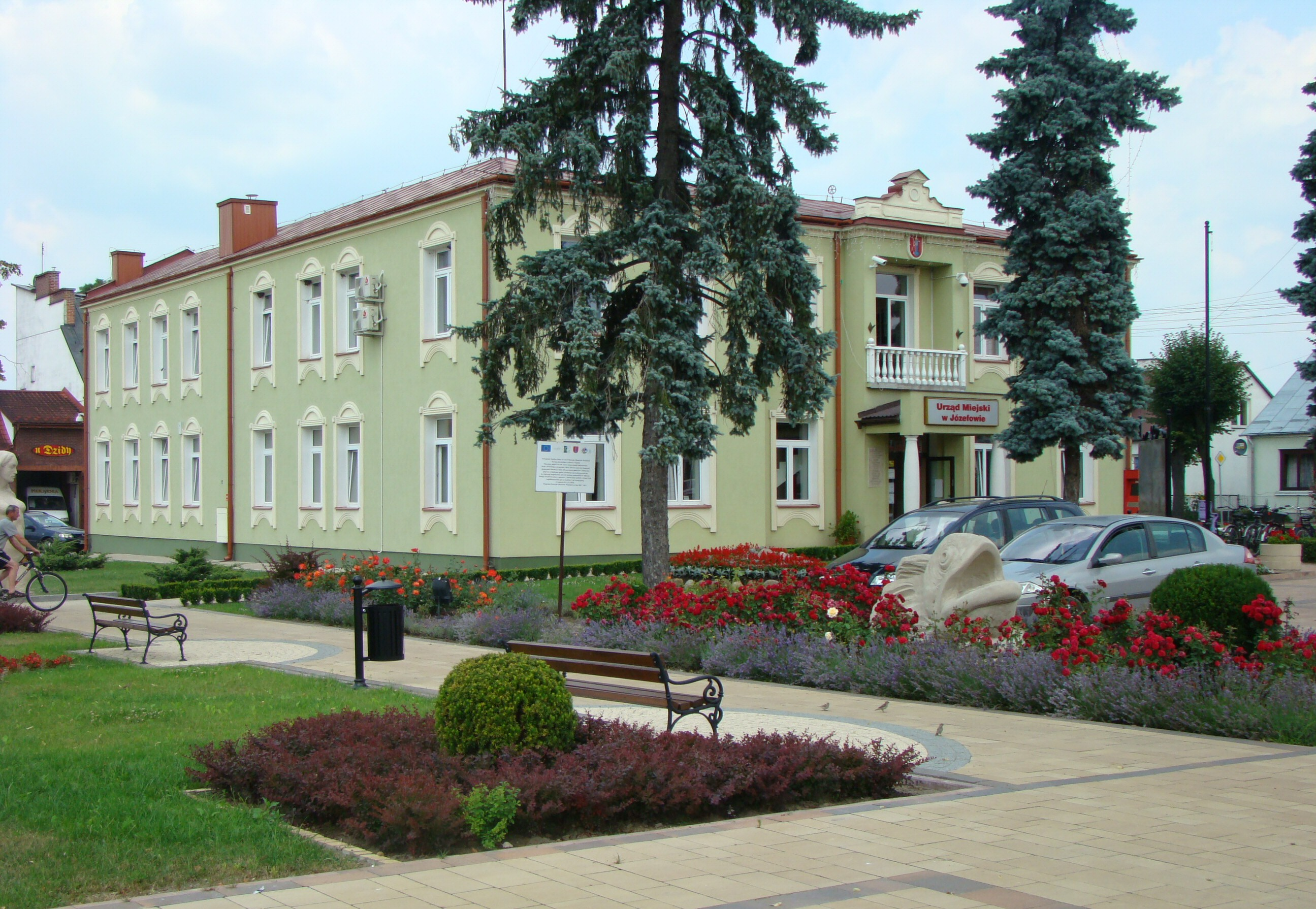
- Gmina Office in Józefów

- Coat of arms
- Interactive map of Gmina Józefów
- Coordinates (Józefów): 50°29′N 23°3′E
- Country: Poland
- Voivodeship: Lublin
- County: Biłgoraj
- Seat: Józefów

Area
  - Total: 126.46 km^{2} (48.83 sq mi)

Population (2006)
  - Total: 7,266
  - Density: 57.46/km^{2} (148.8/sq mi)
  - Urban: 2,450
  - Rural: 4,816
- Time zone: UTC+1 (CET)
  - Summer (DST): UTC+2 (CEST)
- Vehicle registration: LBL
- Website: http://www.ejozefow.pl

Gmina Józefów is an urban-rural gmina (administrative district) in Biłgoraj County, Lublin Voivodeship, in eastern Poland. Its seat is the town of Józefów, which lies approximately 24 kilometres (15 mi) east of Biłgoraj and 92 km (57 mi) south of the regional capital Lublin.

The gmina covers an area of 126.46 square kilometres (48.8 sq mi), and as of 2006 its total population is 7,266 (out of which the population of Józefów amounts to 2,450, and the population of the rural part of the gmina is 4,816).

The gmina contains parts of the protected areas called Krasnobród Landscape Park and Puszcza Solska Landscape Park.

== Villages ==
Apart from the town of Józefów, Gmina Józefów contains the villages and settlements of Borowina, Brzeziny, Czarny Las-Kolonia, Długi Kąt, Florianka, Górecko Kościelne, Górecko Stare, Hamernia, Majdan Kasztelański, Majdan Nepryski, Samsonówka, Siedliska, Stanisławów, Szopowe and Tarnowola.

== Neighbouring gminas ==
Gmina Józefów is bordered by the gminas of Aleksandrów, Krasnobród, Łukowa, Susiec, Tereszpol and Zwierzyniec.
