= Długi Kąt, Lublin Voivodeship =

Długi Kąt
- Village
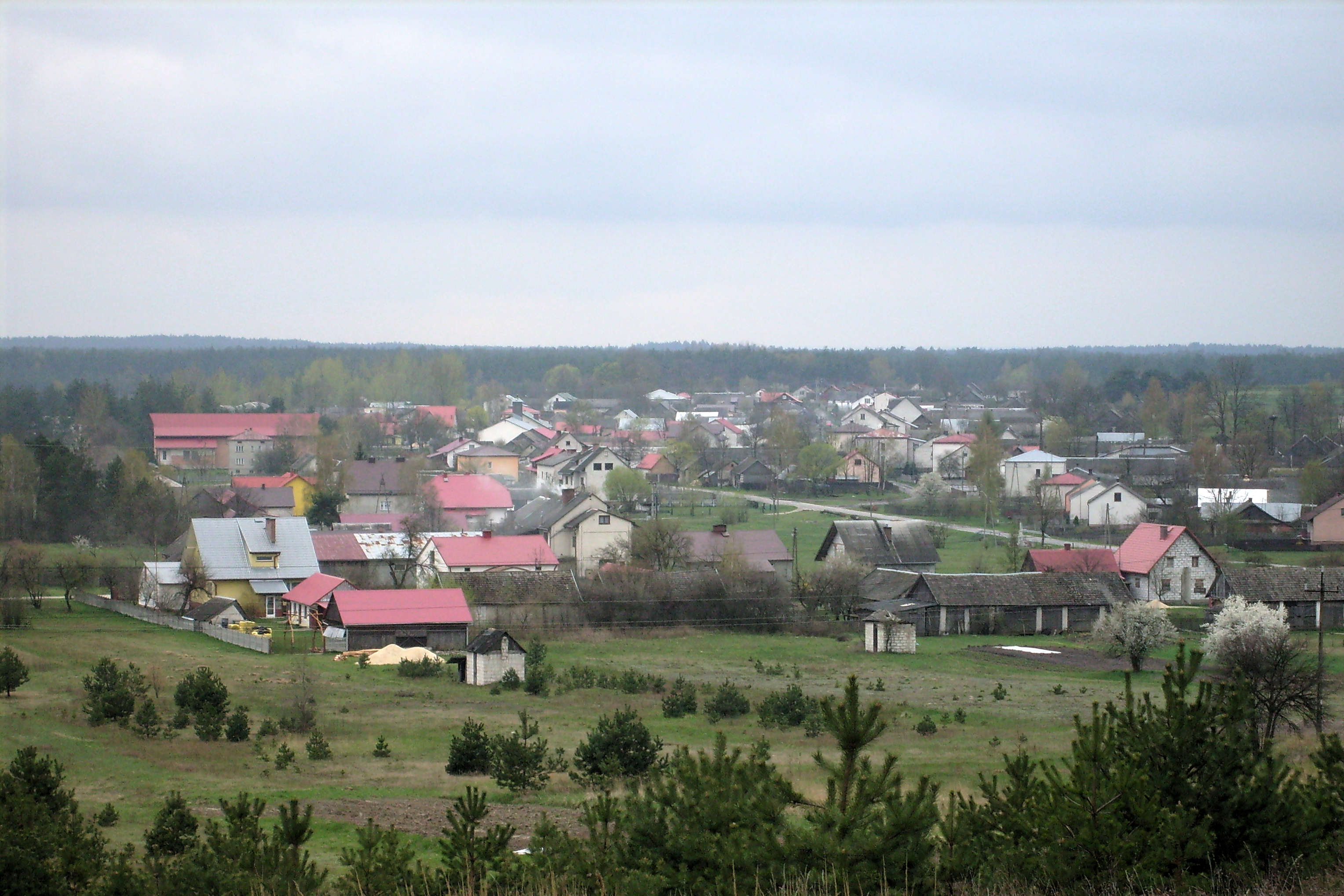
- Panorama of Długi Kąt

- Location within Poland
- Coordinates: 50°30′N 23°7′E
- Country: Poland
- Voivodeship: Lublin
- County: Biłgoraj
- Gmina: Józefów

Population
  - Total: 497
- Time zone: UTC+1 (CET)
  - Summer (DST): UTC+2 (CEST)

Długi Kąt [ˈdwuɡi ˈkɔnt] is a village in the administrative district of Gmina Józefów, within Biłgoraj County, Lublin Voivodeship, in eastern Poland.

== History ==
14 Polish citizens were murdered by Nazi Germany in the village during World War II.
