= Osówek =

Osówek may refer to the following places:

- Osówek, Lublin Voivodeship (east Poland)
- Osówek, Bytów County in Pomeranian Voivodeship (north Poland)
- Osówek, Starogard County in Pomeranian Voivodeship (north Poland)
