= Lute (disambiguation) =

A lute is a plucked string instrument with a neck and a deep round back.

Lute or lutes may also refer to:

== People ==
- Luther Lute Barnes (born 1947), American former Major League Baseball player
- Lutellus Lute Boone (1890–1982), American Major League Baseball player
- Lute Drummond (1879–1949), Australian operatic coach and music director
- Luther Lute Jerstad (1936–1998), American mountaineer and mountain guide
- Robert Luther Lute Olson (1934–2020), American basketball coach
- Lucius Lute Pease (1869–1963), American editorial cartoonist and journalist
- Cees Lute (1941–2022), Dutch cyclist
- Douglas Lute (born 1952), retired United States Army lieutenant general
- Jane Holl Lute (born 1956), United States government official, Deputy Secretary of Homeland Security from 2009 through 2013, wife of Douglas Lute
- Lutes (surname), including a list of people with the name
- El Lute, nickname of Eleuterio Sánchez (born 1942), Spanish pardoned criminal and writer
- Lute (rapper), American rapper Luther Nicholson (born 1989)

== Chemistry and medicine ==
- Lute, in chemical engineering another term for a U-bend
- Lute (material), a substance used historically in chemistry and alchemy experiments
- Lutes (brand name), a combined estrogen and progestogen medication

== Other uses ==
- Lute, Poland, a village
- Lutes, nickname of the sports teams of Pacific Lutheran University, Parkland, Washington, United States
- Lute!, a 2012 rework of Blondel (musical)
- Lute (Hazbin Hotel), a character from the animated adult musical Hazbin Hotel

== See also ==
- Lutte (disambiguation)
