= Kapronie =

- Village
- Location within Poland
- Coordinates: 50°38′N 22°34′E
- Country: Poland
- Voivodeship: Lublin
- County: Janów
- Gmina: Dzwola

Kapronie [kaˈprɔɲɛ] is a village in the administrative district of Gmina Dzwola, within Janów County, Lublin Voivodeship, in eastern Poland. It lies approximately 8 km (5 mi) south of Dzwola, 15 km (9 mi) south-east of Janów Lubelski, and 69 km (43 mi) south of the regional capital Lublin.
