= Ivan Vrona =

- Born: 29 September 1887(17); Otrocz, Gmina Chrzanów, Lublin Voivodeship
- Died: 5 January 1970; Kyiv, Ukrainian SSR, Soviet Union

Ivan Vrona (Russian: Ива́н Ива́нович Вро́на, Ukrainian: Іва́н Іва́нович Вро́на), (29 September [O.S. 17] 1887, Otrocz, — 5 January 1970, Kyiv) was a Ukrainian art critic and artist. He was Rector of the Kyiv Art Institute (1924–1930), one of the founders of The Association of Revolutionary Art of Ukraine (ARMU), PHD (1951). Member of Union of artists of UkSSR. Member of All-Ukrainian Central Executive Committee (1921).

== Biography ==
Born 17 (29 September) in 1887, the village Otrocz Lublin province. In 1914 he graduated from the Law Faculty of Moscow University. In 1912–1914 he studied at the art studio Konstantin Yuon in Moscow, 1918–1920 – at the Ukrainian Academy of Arts in Kyiv.

In 1924–1930 he was the first rector, and then in 1930–1933 and 1945–1948 the teacher at the Kyiv Art Institute. In 1925–1931 he was the director of the Museum of the Arts of the All-Ukrainian Academy of Sciences (VUAN) (now the Bogdan and Barbara Khanenko Art Museum). In 1925–1932 the founder and member of the Association of the revolutionary art of Ukraine. At the same time, in the 1920s, he was a full member of the VUAN Sociological Commission, an associate of the Marxism–Leninism Research Department of the VUAN. In 1926–1930 he was the chairman of the Supreme Cinema Repertory Commission in the People's Commissariat of Education of the Ukrainian SSR. In 1930–1932 he headed the Kyiv Branch of the State Publishing House of Ukraine.

Repressed in 1933. From 1934 to 1936 he was in a concentration camp in Siberia. In 1936–1941 he worked in Moscow and Mozhaysk. From 1943 to 1944 he taught at the Central Asian State University in Tashkent. Rehabilitated 1943 and 1958.

== Theoretical works ==
- 1926 – "Revolutionary art and ARMU"
- 1928 – "Ways of contemporary Ukrainian art".
- 1957 – "Karpo Trokhymenko".
- 1958 – "Mykhailo Derehus" on Mykhailo Derehus.
- 1968 – "Anatol Petrytsky".
