= Łada, Lublin Voivodeship =

Łada
- Village
- Location within Poland
- Coordinates: 50°44′7″N 22°38′20″E
- Country: Poland
- Voivodeship: Lublin
- County: Janów
- Gmina: Chrzanów
- Population (2011): 517
- Postal code: 23-305
- Area code: 15
- Car plates: LJA

Łada (IPA: [ˈwada]) is a village in the administrative district of Gmina Chrzanów, within Janów County, Lublin Voivodeship, in eastern Poland. According to the National Census, it had 517 inhabitants in 2011 and was the third largest village in Gmina Chrzanów.

== History ==
The first mention of the village dates back to 1245 and concerns a raid by knyaz Vasilko. In the 14th century it was a royal village and in 1377 it became the property of Dymitr of Goraj. After his death, it was inherited by his nephews. Then, in 1508, the village was owned by Mikołaj Firlej, the governor of the voivodeship. In 1517 Łada was bought by Wiktoryn Sienieński, who gave it to the Górka family. Toward the end of the 16th century Jan Zamoyski bought the village from their heirs and incorporated it into the ordynacja a few years later (1601). In the mid-17th century, there was a pond with a mill, an orchard and an inn with a brewery in the village. Due to its location, Łada played a role of a craft and service base for Goraj. At the end of the 18th century, there was a folwark, 3 inns and a brewery in the village. During the Napoleonic Wars, due to military travels and quarters, natural disasters, crop failures, and diseases, the population (15 arable land were abandoned), inventory and livestock (50-90%) decreased. In the 19th century Uniates arrived from neighboring Malinie (the Rus population had also been present earlier). According to statistics from 1921 Łada had 116 houses and 702 residents. In the interwar period, a school was established and the Rural Youth Circle Siew was active. During World War II, on May 24, 1944, a German air raid took place. The fire caused by the bombardment consumed 73 households. In 1946 a fire department was established. In 1955-1962, Łada was the seat of a gromada.

== Bibliography ==
- Myśliński, Kazimierz (1981). Dzieje kariery politycznej w średniowiecznej Polsce. Dymitr z Goraja (1340–1400). Lublin. p. 252.
- Sochacka, Anna (1987). Własność ziemska w województwie lubelskim w średniowieczu. Lublin. pp. 27, 71.
- Orłowski, Ryszard (1987). Położenie i walka klasowa chłopów w Ordynacji Zamojskiej w drugiej połowie XVIII wieku. Lublin. p. 27.
- Tarnawski, Aleksander (1935). Działalność gospodarcza Jana Zamoyskiego. Lwów. pp. 21–22, 92.
- Kuraś, Stanisław (1983). Słownik historyczno-geograficzny województwa lubelskiego w średniowieczu. Dzieje Lubelszczyzny. Vol. 3. Warsaw. p. 134.
- Fajkowski, Józef (1972). Wieś w ogniu. Eksterminacja wsi polskiej w okresie okupacji hitlerowskiej. Warsaw. p. 321.
- Stworzyński, Mikołaj (1834). Opisanie historyczno-jeograficzne ordynacji zamojskiej z 1834 r. pp. 18, 79.
- Drabent, Zygmunt (1979). Reforma rolna PKWN w kraśnickiem. Lublin. pp. 30–31.
- Skorowidz miejscowości Rzeczypospolitej Polskiej. Województwo lubelskie. (1924). 4. Warsaw. p. 36.
- Opis Gmin Powiatu Janowskiego, 1933 r.
- Archiwum Ordynacji Zamojskiej, sygn.:9, 15; 3198, 12–12v, 32v–35v.
