= Zdziłowice =

- Village
- Location within Poland
- Coordinates: 50°48′50″N 22°31′57″E
- Country: Poland
- Voivodeship: Lublin
- County: Janów
- Gmina: Godziszów
- Elevation: 295 m (968 ft)
- Population: 1,980

Zdziłowice [zd͡ʑiwɔˈvit͡sɛ] is a village in the administrative district of Gmina Godziszów, within Janów County, Lublin Voivodeship, in eastern Poland.
