= Modliborzyce, Lublin Voivodeship =

Modliborzyce
- Town
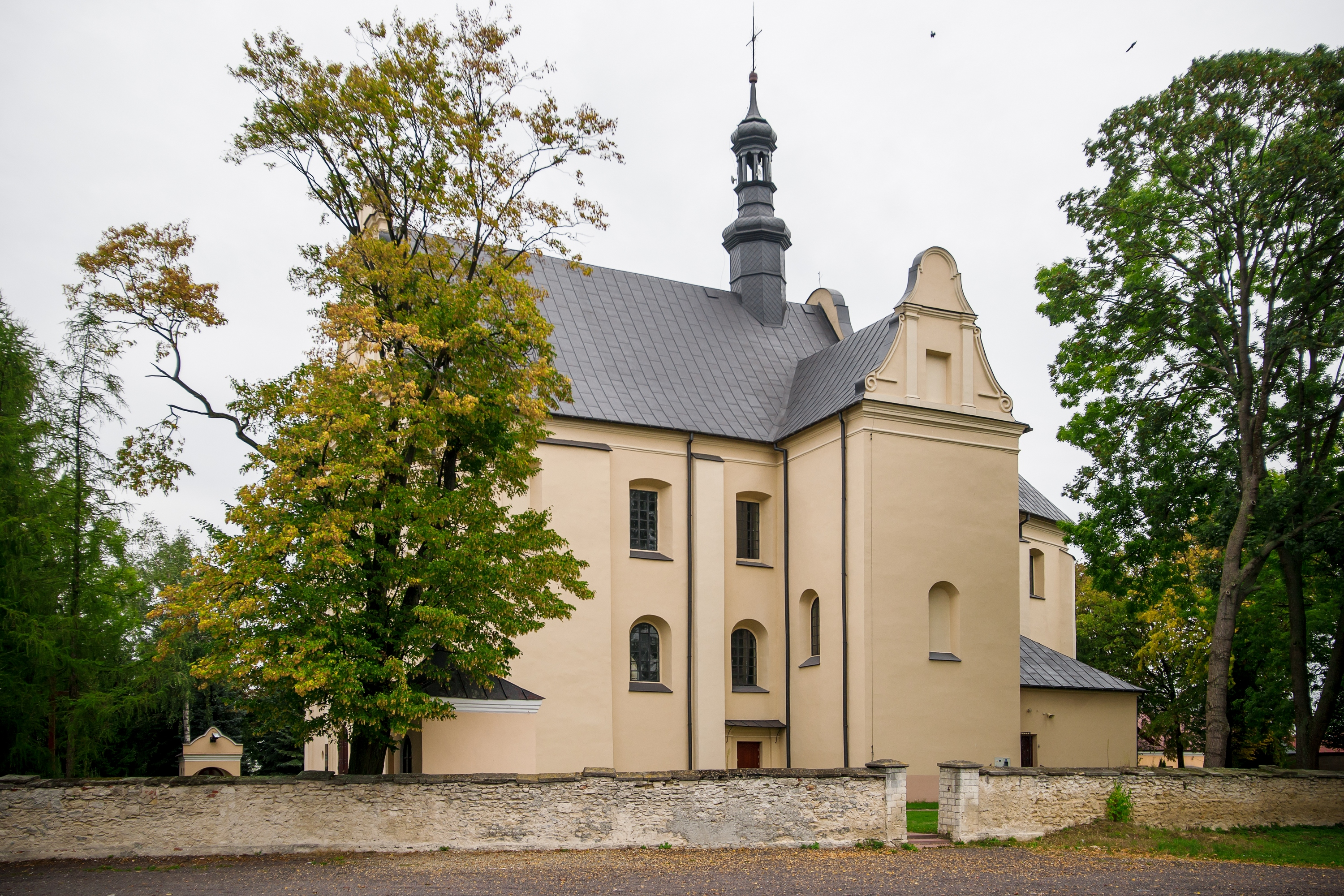
- Baroque Saint Stanislaus church in Modliborzyce

- Flag Coat of arms

- Location within Poland
- Coordinates: 50°45′9″N 22°19′46″E
- Country: Poland
- Voivodeship: Lublin
- County: Janów
- Gmina: Modliborzyce
- Established: 1631
- Town rights: 1631
- Founder: Stanisław Wioteski

Government
  - Mayor: Witold Wiesław Kowalik (Ind.)

Population
  - Total: 1,311
- Time zone: UTC+1 (CET)
  - Summer (DST): UTC+2 (CEST)
- Vehicle registration: LJA
- Website: https://modliborzyce.pl/

Modliborzyce [mɔdlibɔˈʐɨt͡sɛ] is a town in Janów County, Lublin Voivodeship, in eastern Poland. It is the seat of the gmina (administrative district) called Gmina Modliborzyce. It has a population of 1,311.

Modliborzyce is picturesquely located at the point where three major geographical regions of Poland meet - Lublin Upland, Sandomierz Basin, and Roztocze. Southern part of the town belongs to the Landscape Park of Janów Forest, and northern is covered by the protected area of Roztocze.

== Name ==
The name comes from Modliborzyce, Świętokrzyskie Voivodeship, which had existed before the foundation of the town. The name Modliborzyce itself is based on an ancient Polish given name Modlibog.

== History ==
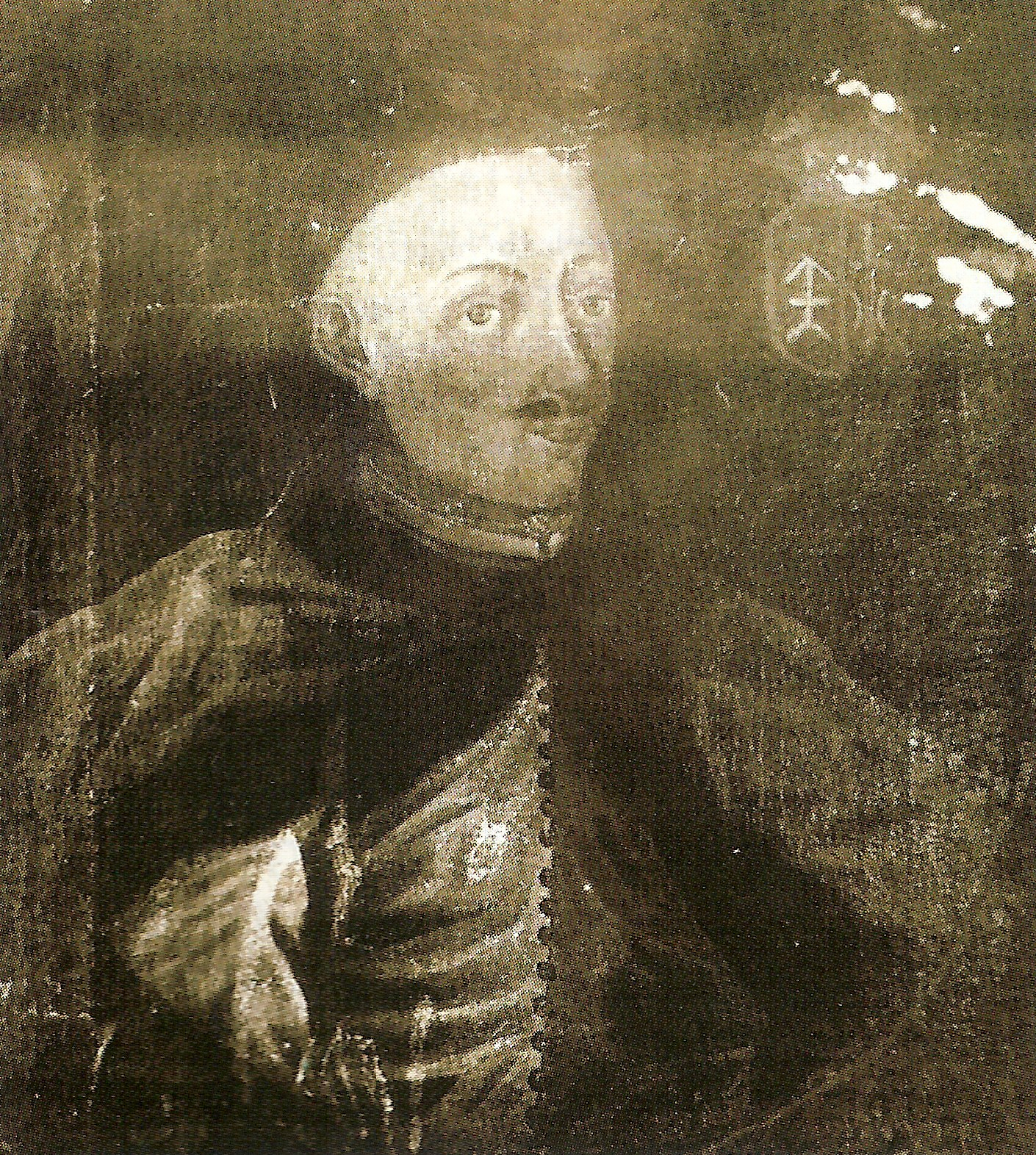
Stanisław Wioteski, the founder of Modliborzyce

The history of the town dates back to February 27, 1631, when a local nobleman Stanisław Wioteski of Rola coat of arms received King Sigismund III Vasa’s permission to found a town in the area of the already-existing village of Słupie. The town was called Modliborzyce, and in 1644–1664, the church of St. Stanisław was built. The Wioteski family's Rota coat of arms is the town's official coat of arms since. After the Wioteski family, the town belonged to Mikołaj Słoniewski. In the second half of the 17th century, a synagogue was opened, due to a steady influx of Jewish settlers. During the Great Northern War, in 1706 Russian troops were garrisoned in Modliborzyce, which had a negative influence on the development of the town. In the 18th and 19th centuries, Modliborzyce belonged to several noble families - the Nahorecki, the Wierciński, the Doliński and the Gorzkowski. Since 1815 the town belonged to Russian-controlled Congress Poland. Modliborzyce burned in 1804 and 1841, and in 1855 its population was decimated by the cholera.

During the January Uprising, on initiative of a local nobleman Ignacy Solman, a regiment was formed, which was engaged in a skirmish with the Russians near Janów Lubelski. Solman was killed by the Cossacks, and in 1869 Russian government punished Modliborzyce by reducing it to the status of a village. Modliborzyce was again part of independent Poland since 1918, when the country regained sovereignty after World War I.

During the joint German-Soviet invasion of Poland, which started World War II in September 1939, the Luftwaffe twice bombed Modliborzyce (September 8 and 15). As a result, 87 people died and most of the buildings in the town were destroyed. The local wójt (head of the gmina) Karol Potocki was murdered by the Germans during large massacres of Poles committed in 1940 in Rury, Lublin as part of the AB-Aktion. In 1940 German authorities brought some 1,200 Jews from Vienna to the Modliborzyce ghetto. This group later perished – with the local Jewish population of 1,200 Jews – at Bełżec extermination camp in October and November 1942. The Jewish community ceased to exist. Modliborzyce was one of local centers of the Home Army, and German occupation ended in July 1944.

Town rights of Modliborzyce were restored on 1 January 2014.

== Sights ==
Due to its location, Modliborzyce is a tourist center of local importance. Its most important points of interest are the Baroque church of Saint Stanislaus (1644–1664), bell tower (1775), and a synagogue (1760), which now houses the center of culture.
