= Borownica =

Borownica refers to the following places in Poland:

- Borownica, Lublin Voivodeship
- Borownica, Podkarpackie Voivodeship
