= Biała Pierwsza, Lublin Voivodeship =

Biała Pierwsza
- Village
- Location within Poland
- Coordinates: 50°43′12″N 22°25′35″E
- Country: Poland
- Voivodeship: Lublin
- County: Janów
- Gmina: Janów Lubelski
- Population: 940

Biała Pierwsza [ˈbjawa ˈpjɛrfʂa] is a village in the administrative district of Gmina Janów Lubelski, within Janów County, Lublin Voivodeship, in eastern Poland.
