= Maliniec, Lublin Voivodeship =

Maliniec
- Village
- Location within Poland
- Coordinates: 50°42′37″N 22°12′1″E
- Country: Poland
- Voivodeship: Lublin
- County: Janów
- Gmina: Potok Wielki
- Time zone: UTC+1 (CET)
  - Summer (DST): UTC+2 (CEST)

Maliniec [maˈliɲɛt͡s] is a village in the administrative district of Gmina Potok Wielki, within Janów County, Lublin Voivodeship, in eastern Poland.

== History ==
Five Polish citizens were murdered by Nazi Germany in the village during World War II.
