= Ruda, Janów County =

Ruda
- Village
- Location within Poland
- Coordinates: 50°41′41″N 22°22′59″E
- Country: Poland
- Voivodeship: Lublin
- County: Janów
- Gmina: Janów Lubelski

Ruda [ˈruda] is a village in the administrative district of Gmina Janów Lubelski, within Janów County, Lublin Voivodeship, in eastern Poland.
