= Kopce, Lublin Voivodeship =

Kopce
- Village
- Location within Poland
- Coordinates: 50°43′42″N 22°20′52″E
- Country: Poland
- Voivodeship: Lublin
- County: Janów
- Gmina: Janów Lubelski
- Population: 28

Kopce [ˈkɔpt͡sɛ] is a village in the administrative district of Gmina Janów Lubelski, within Janów County, Lublin Voivodeship, in eastern Poland.
