= Łążek Ordynacki =

- Village
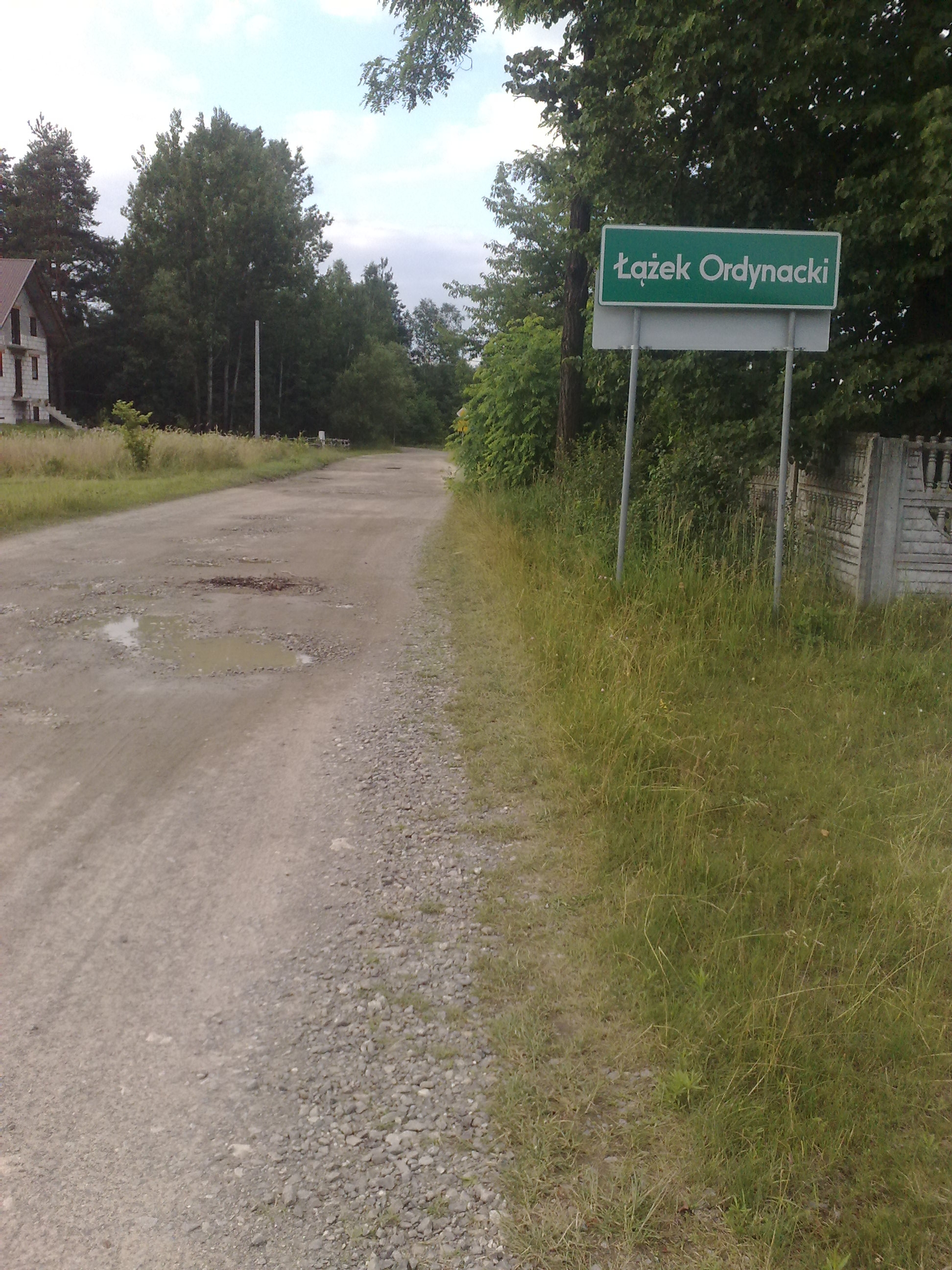

- Location within Poland
- Coordinates: 50°38′19″N 22°17′10″E
- Country: Poland
- Voivodeship: Lublin
- County: Janów
- Gmina: Janów Lubelski

Population
  - Total: 530
- Time zone: UTC+1 (CET)
  - Summer (DST): UTC+2 (CEST)

Łążek Ordynacki [ˈwɔ̃ʐɛk ɔrdɨˈnat͡ski] is a village in the administrative district of Gmina Janów Lubelski, within Janów County, Lublin Voivodeship, in eastern Poland.

== History ==
Three Polish citizens were murdered by Nazi Germany in the village during World War II.
