= Nowe Moczydła =

- Village
- Location within Poland
- Coordinates: 50°50′N 22°24′E
- Country: Poland
- Voivodeship: Lublin
- County: Janów
- Gmina: Batorz

Nowe Moczydła [ˈnɔvɛ mɔˈt͡ʂɨdwa] is a village in the administrative district of Gmina Batorz, within Janów County, Lublin Voivodeship, in eastern Poland.
