= Potok-Stany =

- Village
- Location within Poland
- Coordinates: 50°48′45″N 22°13′18″E
- Country: Poland
- Voivodeship: Lublin
- County: Janów
- Gmina: Potok Wielki

Potok-Stany [ˈpɔtɔk ˈstanɨ] is a village in the administrative district of Gmina Potok Wielki, within Janów County, Lublin Voivodeship, in eastern Poland.
