= Zarajec Potocki =

- Village
- Location within Poland
- Coordinates: 50°47′26″N 22°16′58″E
- Country: Poland
- Voivodeship: Lublin
- County: Janów
- Gmina: Potok Wielki

Zarajec Potocki [zaˈrajɛt͡s pɔˈtɔt͡ski] is a village in the administrative district of Gmina Potok Wielki, within Janów County, Lublin Voivodeship, in eastern Poland.
