= Stawce =

- Village
- Location within Poland
- Coordinates: 50°53′N 22°32′E
- Country: Poland
- Voivodeship: Lublin
- County: Janów
- Gmina: Batorz

Stawce [ˈstaft͡sɛ] is a village in the administrative district of Gmina Batorz, within Janów County, Lublin Voivodeship, in eastern Poland.
