= Rataj Poduchowny =

- Village
- Location within Poland
- Coordinates: 50°44′N 22°27′E
- Country: Poland
- Voivodeship: Lublin
- County: Janów
- Gmina: Godziszów

Rataj Poduchowny [ˈratai̯ pɔduˈxɔvnɨ] is a village in the administrative district of Gmina Godziszów, within Janów County, Lublin Voivodeship, in eastern Poland.
