= Wólka Batorska =

- Village
- Location within Poland
- Coordinates: 50°52′N 22°31′E
- Country: Poland
- Voivodeship: Lublin
- County: Janów
- Gmina: Batorz

Wólka Batorska [ˈvulka baˈtɔrska] is a village in the administrative district of Gmina Batorz, within Janów County, Lublin Voivodeship, in eastern Poland.
