= Kocudza Trzecia =

- Village
- Location within Poland
- Coordinates: 50°39′30″N 22°37′18″E
- Country: Poland
- Voivodeship: Lublin
- County: Janów
- Gmina: Dzwola

Kocudza Trzecia [kɔˈt͡sud͡za ˈtʂɛt͡ɕa] is a village in the administrative district of Gmina Dzwola, within Janów County, Lublin Voivodeship, in eastern Poland.
