= Lutte =

Lutte, meaning 'struggle' or 'fight' in French, is also used to refer to the sport of wrestling.

Lutte or La Lutte may also refer to:

- La Lutte (1883), a French language anarchist newspaper in 1880s Lyon
- La Lutte (newspaper), a French-language communist newspaper in 1930s Saigon
- Lutte Traditionnelle, a form of West African folk wrestling
- Wrestling (1961 film), a 1961 French documentary film, titled in French as La Lutte

== See also ==
- Lute (disambiguation)
- Lutes (surname)
