= Gmina Chrzanów =

Gmina Chrzanów may refer to either of the following administrative districts in Poland:

- Gmina Chrzanów, Lesser Poland Voivodeship
- Gmina Chrzanów, Lublin Voivodeship
