= Stawce-Kolonia =

- Village
- Location within Poland
- Coordinates: 50°54′1″N 22°30′53″E
- Country: Poland
- Voivodeship: Lublin
- County: Janów
- Gmina: Batorz

Stawce-Kolonia [ˈstaft͡sɛ kɔˈlɔɲa] is a village in the administrative district of Gmina Batorz, within Janów County, Lublin Voivodeship, in eastern Poland.
