= Kolonia Zamek =

- Village
- Location within Poland
- Coordinates: 50°44′51″N 22°20′48″E
- Country: Poland
- Voivodeship: Lublin
- County: Janów
- Gmina: Modliborzyce

Kolonia Zamek [kɔˈlɔɲa ˈzamɛk] is a village in the administrative district of Gmina Modliborzyce, within Janów County, Lublin Voivodeship, in eastern Poland.
