= Dąbrowica, Janów County =

Dąbrowica
- Village
- Location within Poland
- Coordinates: 50°50′10″N 22°15′15″E
- Country: Poland
- Voivodeship: Lublin
- County: Janów
- Gmina: Potok Wielki

Dąbrowica [dɔmbrɔˈvit͡sa] is a village in the administrative district of Gmina Potok Wielki, within Janów County, Lublin Voivodeship, in eastern Poland.
