= Biała Druga, Lublin Voivodeship =

Biała Druga
- Village
- Location within Poland
- Coordinates: 50°43′1″N 22°24′56″E
- Country: Poland
- Voivodeship: Lublin
- County: Janów
- Gmina: Janów Lubelski

Biała Druga [ˈbjawa ˈdruɡa] is a village in the administrative district of Gmina Janów Lubelski, within Janów County, Lublin Voivodeship, in eastern Poland.
