= Battle of Sowia Góra =

Battle of Sowia Góra (Battle of Batorz)
- Part of the January Uprising
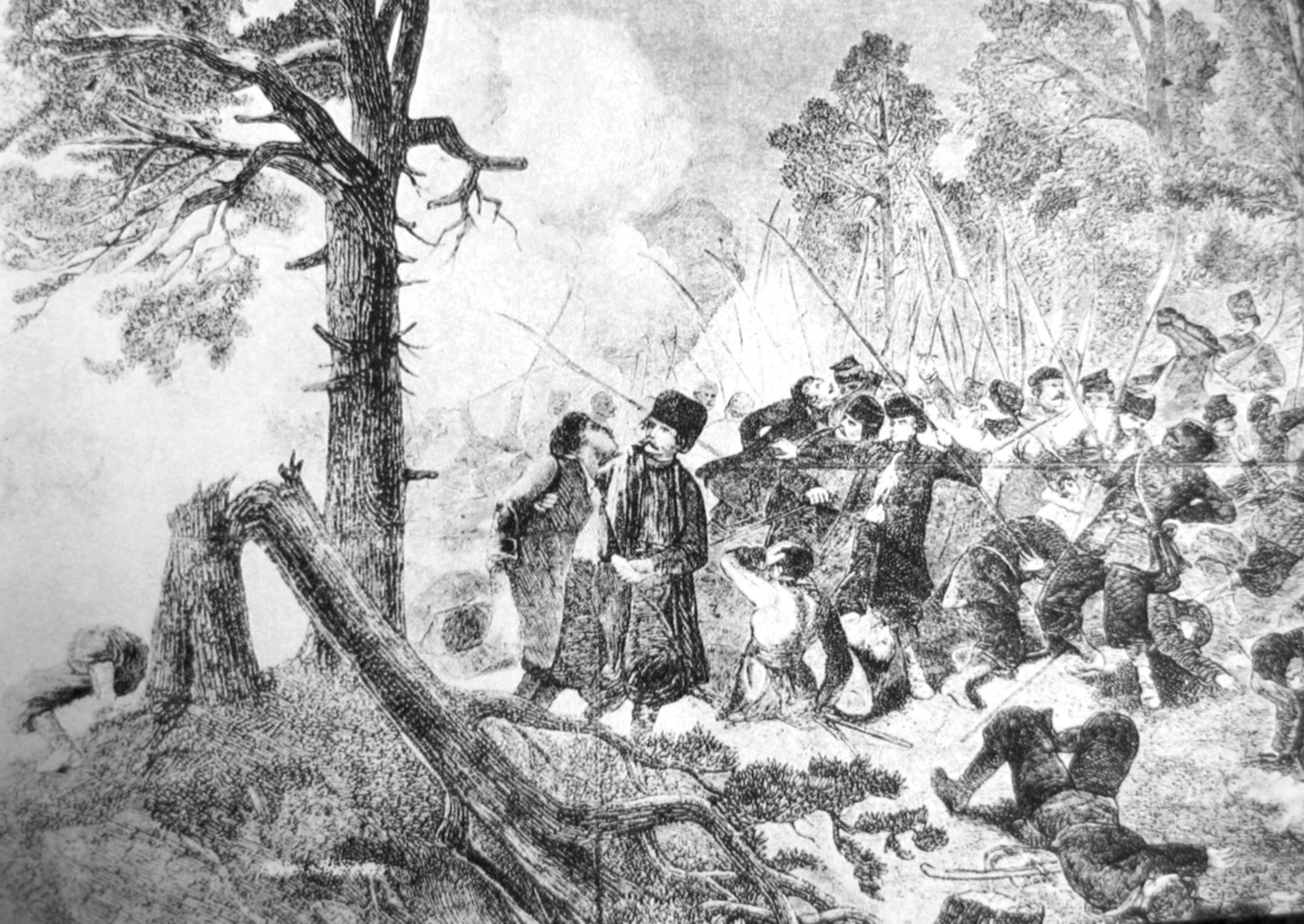
- Battle of Batorz, 19th century engraving
Date	6 September 1863
Location	Batorz
Result	Russian victory

Belligerents
(Poland) Polish insurgents (Hungary) Hungarian volunteers	Russian Empire

Commanders and leaders
(Poland) Marcin Borelowski †	Lt col. Yolshin

Strength
700 (including group of Hungarian volunteers)	Elements of 18th Vologdan Infantry Regiment

Casualties and losses
31 killed, 47 wounded	According to Russian sources: 4 killed, 1 mortally wounded, 8 wounded

The Battle of Batorz of September 6, 1863, also known as the Battle of Sowia Góra hill near the village of Batorz, was one of many battles of the January Uprising against the tsarist oppression. It took place in the Russian-controlled Congress Poland. During the battle, a party of 700 Polish insurgents, together with Hungarian volunteers, and commanded by Marcin Borelowski, clashed with soldiers of the Imperial Russian Army. The battle resulted in Russian victory.

After the Battle of Panasówka, Borelowski ordered his party to march towards Goraj. When the insurgents reached the village of Otrocz, they decided to rest there for a while, unaware of the Cossack presence in the area. The Cossacks surrounded them and attacked both from front and rear. Polish unit was destroyed, with Borelowski himself killed. Among those killed also was baron Wallisch, a Hungarian volunteer. The dead were buried in a mass grave at a Batorz cemetery. In 1933, a symbolic mound was created on the site of the battle.

== Sources ==
- Stefan Kieniewicz: Powstanie styczniowe. Warszawa: Państwowe Wydawnictwo Naukowe, 1983. ISBN 83-01-03652-4.
