= Kalenne =

- Village
- Location within Poland
- Coordinates: 50°41′N 22°16′E
- Country: Poland
- Voivodeship: Lublin
- County: Janów
- Gmina: Modliborzyce

Kalenne [kaˈlɛnnɛ] is a village in the administrative district of Gmina Modliborzyce, within Janów County, Lublin Voivodeship, in eastern Poland.
