= Wola Studzieńska-Kolonia =

- Village
- Location within Poland
- Coordinates: 50°53′33″N 22°28′56″E
- Country: Poland
- Voivodeship: Lublin
- County: Janów
- Gmina: Batorz

Wola Studzieńska-Kolonia [ˈvɔla stuˈd͡ʑɛɲska kɔˈlɔɲa] is a village in the administrative district of Gmina Batorz, within Janów County, Lublin Voivodeship, in eastern Poland.
