= Antolin, Janów County =

Antolin
- Village
- Location within Poland
- Coordinates: 50°48′N 22°27′E
- Country: Poland
- Voivodeship: Lublin
- County: Janów
- Gmina: Modliborzyce

Antolin [anˈtɔlin] is a village in the administrative district of Gmina Modliborzyce, within Janów County, Lublin Voivodeship, in eastern Poland.
