= Wolica Druga =

- Village
- Location within Poland
- Coordinates: 50°46′9″N 22°22′6″E
- Country: Poland
- Voivodeship: Lublin
- County: Janów
- Gmina: Modliborzyce

Wolica Druga [vɔˈlit͡sa ˈdruɡa] is a village in the administrative district of Gmina Modliborzyce, within Janów County, Lublin Voivodeship, in eastern Poland.
