= Świnki, Lublin Voivodeship =

Świnki
- Village
- Location within Poland
- Coordinates: 50°43′N 22°18′E
- Country: Poland
- Voivodeship: Lublin
- County: Janów
- Gmina: Modliborzyce

Świnki [ˈɕfiŋki] is a village in the administrative district of Gmina Modliborzyce, within Janów County, Lublin Voivodeship, in eastern Poland.
