= Andrzejów, Janów County =

Andrzejów
- Village
- Location within Poland
- Coordinates: 50°46′N 22°26′E
- Country: Poland
- Voivodeship: Lublin
- County: Janów
- Gmina: Godziszów

Andrzejów [anˈdʐɛjuf] is a village in the administrative district of Gmina Godziszów, within Janów County, Lublin Voivodeship, in eastern Poland.
