= Wolica Pierwsza =

- Village
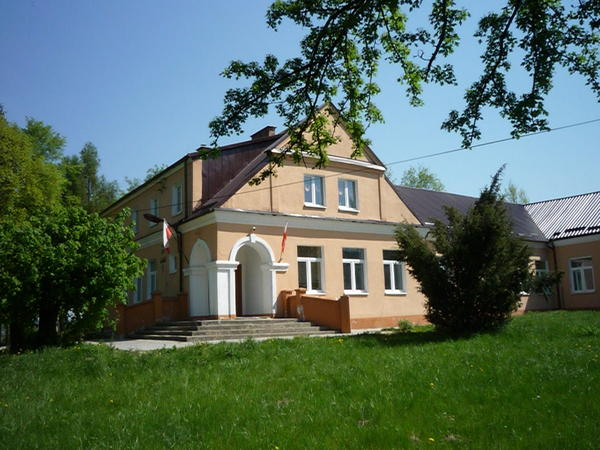

- Location within Poland
- Coordinates: 50°45′53″N 22°22′15″E
- Country: Poland
- Voivodeship: Lublin
- County: Janów
- Gmina: Modliborzyce

Wolica Pierwsza [vɔˈlit͡sa ˈpjɛrfʂa] is a village in the administrative district of Gmina Modliborzyce, within Janów County, Lublin Voivodeship, in eastern Poland.
