= Suchora =

Suchora is a surname. Notable people with the surname include:

- Agnieszka Suchora (born 1968), Polish actress
- Henryk Suchora (1951–2024), Polish politician
