= Samary =

Samary may refer to:

- Samary, Poland
- Catherine Samary, French academic, author and political activist
- Jeanne Samary (1857–1890), French actress
