= Łążek Garncarski =

- Village
- Location within Poland
- Coordinates: 50°38′6″N 22°16′6″E
- Country: Poland
- Voivodeship: Lublin
- County: Janów
- Gmina: Janów Lubelski
- Population: 200

Łążek Garncarski [ˈwɔ̃ʐɛk ɡarnˈt͡sarski] is a village in the administrative district of Gmina Janów Lubelski, within Janów County, Lublin Voivodeship, in eastern Poland.
