= Stojeszyn Pierwszy =

- Village
- Location within Poland
- Coordinates: 50°45′34″N 22°16′37″E
- Country: Poland
- Voivodeship: Lublin
- County: Janów
- Gmina: Modliborzyce

Stojeszyn Pierwszy [stɔˈjɛʂɨn ˈpjɛrfʂɨ] is a village in the administrative district of Gmina Modliborzyce, within Janów County, Lublin Voivodeship, in eastern Poland.
