= Godziszów =

Godziszów may refer to:

- Godziszów, Lublin Voivodeship, a village in Janów County, Lublin Voivodeship, in eastern Poland
- Godziszów, Silesian Voivodeship, a village in Gmina Goleszów, Cieszyn County, Silesian Voivodeship, southern Poland
