= Branewka =

- Village
- Location within Poland
- Coordinates: 50°43′N 22°33′E
- Country: Poland
- Voivodeship: Lublin
- County: Janów
- Gmina: Dzwola

Branewka [braˈnɛfka] is a village in the administrative district of Gmina Dzwola, within Janów County, Lublin Voivodeship, in eastern Poland.
