= Wola Studzieńska =

- Village
- Location within Poland
- Coordinates: 50°52′54″N 22°29′15″E
- Country: Poland
- Voivodeship: Lublin
- County: Janów
- Gmina: Batorz

Wola Studzieńska [ˈvɔla stuˈd͡ʑɛɲska] is a village in the administrative district of Gmina Batorz, within Janów County, Lublin Voivodeship, in eastern Poland.
