= Majdan, Janów County =

Majdan Modliborski
- Village
- Location within Poland
- Coordinates: 50°44′N 22°19′E
- Country: Poland
- Voivodeship: Lublin
- County: Janów
- Gmina: Modliborzyce
- Time zone: UTC+1 (CET)
  - Summer (DST): UTC+2 (CEST)

Majdan (Polish pronunciation: [ˈmajdan]) is a village in the administrative district of Gmina Modliborzyce, within Janów County, Lublin Voivodeship, in eastern Poland.

== History ==
Three Polish citizens were murdered by Nazi Germany in the village during World War II.
