= Branewka-Kolonia =

- Village
- Location within Poland
- Coordinates: 50°43′13″N 22°32′54″E
- Country: Poland
- Voivodeship: Lublin
- County: Janów
- Gmina: Dzwola
- Time zone: UTC+1 (CET)
  - Summer (DST): UTC+2 (CEST)
- Vehicle registration: LJA

Branewka-Kolonia [braˈnɛfka kɔˈlɔɲa] is a village in the administrative district of Gmina Dzwola, within Janów County, Lublin Voivodeship, in eastern Poland.

== History ==
Five Polish citizens were murdered by Nazi Germany in the village during World War II.
