= Błażek =

- Village
- Location within Poland
- Coordinates: 50°51′N 22°26′E
- Country: Poland
- Voivodeship: Lublin
- County: Janów
- Gmina: Batorz

Błażek [ˈbwaʐɛk] is a village in the administrative district of Gmina Batorz, within Janów County, Lublin Voivodeship, in eastern Poland.
