= Ciechocin =

Ciechocin may refer to the following places:

- Ciechocin, Kuyavian-Pomeranian Voivodeship (north-central Poland)
- Ciechocin, Lublin Voivodeship (east Poland)
- Ciechocin, Pomeranian Voivodeship (north Poland)
