= Szklarnia, Janów County =

Village in Poland

Szklarnia
- Village
- Location within Poland
- Coordinates: 50°38′N 22°24′E
- Country: Poland
- Voivodeship: Lublin
- County: Janów
- Gmina: Janów Lubelski

Szklarnia [ˈʂklarɲa] is a village in the administrative district of Gmina Janów Lubelski, within Janów County, Lublin Voivodeship, in eastern Poland.
