= Popielarnia, Lublin Voivodeship =

Popielarnia
- Settlement
- Location within Poland
- Coordinates: 50°49′36″N 22°14′48″E
- Country: Poland
- Voivodeship: Lublin
- County: Janów
- Gmina: Potok Wielki

Popielarnia [pɔpjɛˈlarɲa] is a settlement in the administrative district of Gmina Potok Wielki, within Janów County, Lublin Voivodeship, in eastern Poland.
