= Brzeziny, Janów County =

Brzeziny
- Village
- Location within Poland
- Coordinates: 50°45′N 22°15′E
- Country: Poland
- Voivodeship: Lublin
- County: Janów
- Gmina: Modliborzyce
- Population: 100

Brzeziny [bʐɛˈʑinɨ] is a village in the administrative district of Gmina Modliborzyce, within Janów County, Lublin Voivodeship, in eastern Poland.
