= Władysławów, Janów County =

Władysławów
- Village
- Location within Poland
- Coordinates: 50°37′32″N 22°33′53″E
- Country: Poland
- Voivodeship: Lublin
- County: Janów
- Gmina: Dzwola

Władysławów [vwadɨˈswavuf] is a village in the administrative district of Gmina Dzwola, within Janów County, Lublin Voivodeship, in eastern Poland.
