= Pasieka, Janów County =

Pasieka
- Village
- Location within Poland
- Coordinates: 50°49′32″N 22°25′46″E
- Country: Poland
- Voivodeship: Lublin
- County: Janów
- Gmina: Modliborzyce

Pasieka [paˈɕɛka] is a village in the administrative district of Gmina Modliborzyce, within Janów County, Lublin Voivodeship, in eastern Poland.
