= Krzemień Drugi =

- Village
- Location within Poland
- Coordinates: 50°41′45″N 22°31′34″E
- Country: Poland
- Voivodeship: Lublin
- County: Janów
- Gmina: Dzwola

Krzemień Drugi [ˈkʂɛmjɛɲ ˈdruɡi] is a village in the administrative district of Gmina Dzwola, within Janów County, Lublin Voivodeship, in eastern Poland.
