= Felinów, Lublin Voivodeship =

Felinów
- Village
- Location within Poland
- Coordinates: 50°47′N 22°17′E
- Country: Poland
- Voivodeship: Lublin
- County: Janów
- Gmina: Modliborzyce

Felinów [fɛˈlinuf] is a village in the administrative district of Gmina Modliborzyce, within Janów County, Lublin Voivodeship, in eastern Poland.
