= Konstantów, Lublin Voivodeship =

Konstantów
- Village
- Location within Poland
- Coordinates: 50°41′N 22°33′E
- Country: Poland
- Voivodeship: Lublin
- County: Janów
- Gmina: Dzwola

Konstantów [kɔnsˈtantuf] is a village in the administrative district of Gmina Dzwola, within Janów County, Lublin Voivodeship, in eastern Poland.
