= Rataj Ordynacki =

- Village
- Location within Poland
- Coordinates: 50°44′N 22°28′E
- Country: Poland
- Voivodeship: Lublin
- County: Janów
- Gmina: Godziszów
- Population: 500

Rataj Ordynacki [ˈratai̯ ɔrdɨˈnat͡ski] is a village in the administrative district of Gmina Godziszów, within Janów County, Lublin Voivodeship, in eastern Poland.
