= Momoty Górne =

- Village
- Location within Poland
- Coordinates: 50°36′N 22°26′E
- Country: Poland
- Voivodeship: Lublin
- County: Janów
- Gmina: Janów Lubelski
- Website: http://www.momoty.sandomierz.opoka.org.pl/

Momoty Górne [mɔˈmɔtɨ ˈɡurnɛ] is a village in the administrative district of Gmina Janów Lubelski, within Janów County, Lublin Voivodeship, in eastern Poland.
