= Stojeszyn Drugi =

- Village
- Location within Poland
- Coordinates: 50°45′20″N 22°16′46″E
- Country: Poland
- Voivodeship: Lublin
- County: Janów
- Gmina: Modliborzyce

Stojeszyn Drugi [stɔˈjɛʂɨn ˈdruɡi] is a village in the administrative district of Gmina Modliborzyce, within Janów County, Lublin Voivodeship, in eastern Poland.
