= Pilatka =

Piłatka may refer to the following places in Poland:

- Piłatka, Lublin Voivodeship (eastern Poland)
- Piłatka, Masovian Voivodeship (east-central Poland)

The following place in Florida:

- Palatka, Florida

The insect Euphyes pilatka
