= Cegielnia, Janów County =

Cegielnia
- Village
- Location within Poland
- Coordinates: 50°40′39″N 22°24′57″E
- Country: Poland
- Voivodeship: Lublin
- County: Janów
- Gmina: Janów Lubelski
- Population: 5

Cegielnia [t͡sɛˈɡʲɛlɲa] is a village in the administrative district of Gmina Janów Lubelski, within Janów County, Lublin Voivodeship, in eastern Poland.
