= Aleksandrówka, Janów County =

Aleksandrówka
- Village
- Location within Poland
- Coordinates: 50°52′16″N 22°26′33″E
- Country: Poland
- Voivodeship: Lublin
- County: Janów
- Gmina: Batorz

Aleksandrówka [alɛksanˈdrufka] is a village in the administrative district of Gmina Batorz, within Janów County, Lublin Voivodeship, in eastern Poland.
