= Wierzchowiska Pierwsze, Janów County =

Wierzchowiska Pierwsze
- Village
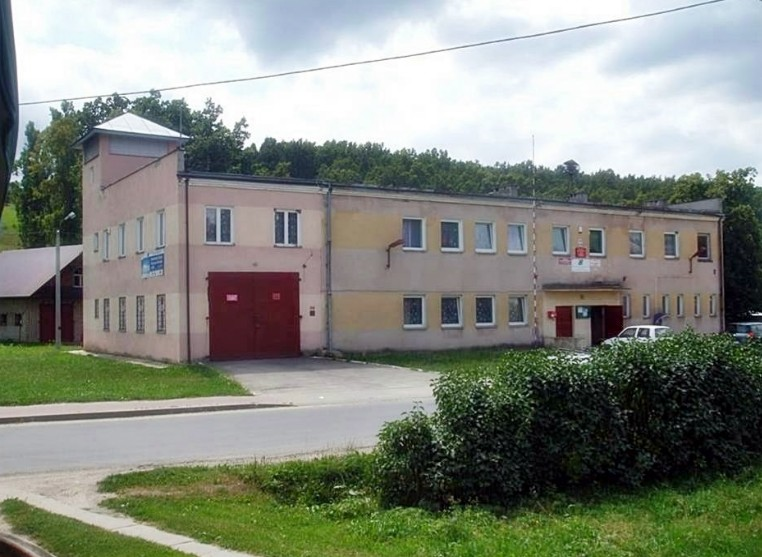
- Fire Station

- Location within Poland
- Coordinates: 50°47′20″N 22°23′22″E
- Country: Poland
- Voivodeship: Lublin
- County: Janów
- Gmina: Modliborzyce

Wierzchowiska Pierwsze [vjɛʂxɔˈviska ˈpjɛrfʂɛ] is a village in the administrative district of Gmina Modliborzyce, within Janów County, Lublin Voivodeship, in eastern Poland.
