= Dominik Trčka =

Czech priest and martyr (1886-1959)

Blessed Dominik Trčka CSsR
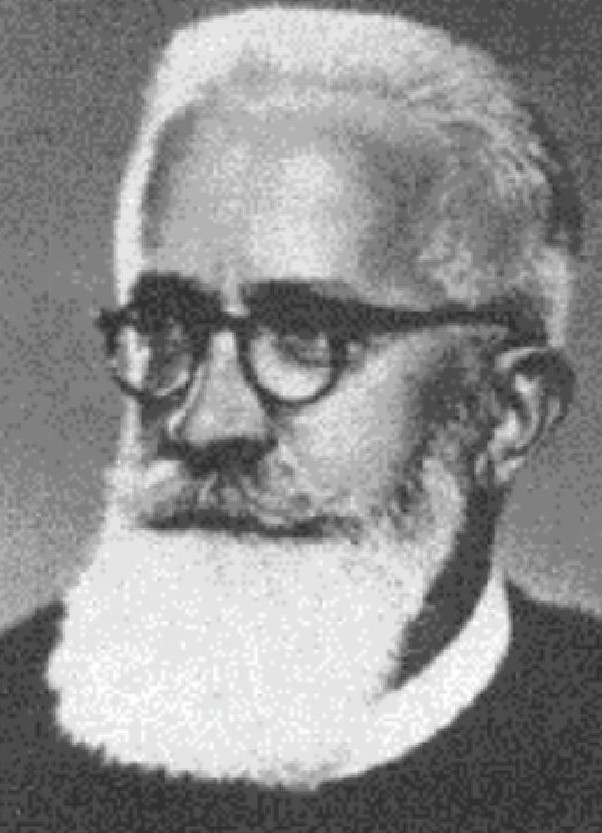

Martyr
- Born: 6 July 1886; Frýdlant nad Ostravicí, Austria-Hungary
- Died: 23 March 1959 (aged 72); Leopoldov Prison, Czechoslovakia
- Venerated in: Roman Catholic Church Byzantine Catholic Churches
- Beatified: 4 November 2001, Saint Peter's Square, Vatican City by Pope John Paul II
- Feast: 23 March

Dominik Trčka (6 July 1886 – 23 March 1959), also known by his religious name Metod, was a Czech priest of the Congregation of the Most Holy Redeemer (Redemptorists). Trčka was engaged in parish missions but went on to also serve Greek Catholics and cater to the needs of the Eastern Rite Catholics who often felt neglected and in great need of pastoral assistance; this was something that Trčka was more than willing to provide for he made serious inroads in terms of the pastoral aid he provided to those people.

He is regarded as a martyr of the Catholic church and was beatified in Saint Peter's Square on 4 November 2001.

== Life ==
Dominik Trčka was born in 1886 in the Czech Republic as the last of seven children to Tomáš Trčka and Františka Šterbová.

He entered the Redemptorist novitiate in Bilsko, Poland in 1902 and he made his profession on 25 August 1904 before returning to Obořiště in his homeland so that he could pursue the required philosophical and theological studies needed for ordination. On 17 July 1910 he received his ordination in Prague to the priesthood from Cardinal Lev Skrbenský z Hříště. He spent some time engaged in parish missions but in 1919 was sent to serve the Greek Catholics while he studied the Eastern Rite in Lviv. Eastern Rite Catholics were often overlooked in number and importance but Trčka worked to readdress the situation and one of his most significant achievements was organizing the establishment in Michalovce of a convent for those Eastern Rite Redemptorist members. During World War I he tended to Slovenian and Croatian people and those wounded in the Pribram hospital. In 1935 - when the Redemptorist communities of the area were reorganized - he was appointed as the vice-provincial of the Byzantine Redemptorists.

With the Communist takeover of Czechoslovakia came a period of religious persecution and in 1950 religious communities were suppressed. On the evening of Holy Thursday 1950 (13 April) he was arrested along with several other Redemptorists. He was put on trial on 21 April and accused of attempting to obtain false papers in order to flee the nation and was sentenced to 12 years in prison. During his imprisonment he endured both torture and interrogation. One of his confreres who was released wrote that the religious were subjected to intense light non-stop.

On 23 March 1959 he died at 9 am as the result of pneumonia after having been placed in solitary confinement as a punishment for singing Christmas carols in 1958. His remains were buried at the prison but on 17 October 1969 were exhumed and placed in the Redemptorist vault in Michalovce.

== Beatification ==
The beatification process commenced in Prešov in a diocesan process that concluded in 2001; the formal introduction came on 6 March 2001 after the Congregation for the Causes of Saints issued the "nihil obstat" and made him a Servant of God. Pope John Paul II confirmed that Trčka died in hatred of his faith on 24 April 2001 and the pope beatified him in Saint Peter's Square on 4 November 2001. The cause's progress lasted almost twelve months and was quite rapid. The current postulator for this cause is the Redemptorist Antonio Marrazzo.
