= Stojeszyn-Kolonia =

- Village
- Location within Poland
- Coordinates: 50°47′30″N 22°17′15″E
- Country: Poland
- Voivodeship: Lublin
- County: Janów
- Gmina: Modliborzyce

Stojeszyn-Kolonia [stɔˈjɛʂɨn kɔˈlɔɲa] is a village in the administrative district of Gmina Modliborzyce, within Janów County, Lublin Voivodeship, in eastern Poland.
