= Kocudza Druga =

- Village
- Location within Poland
- Coordinates: 50°40′30″N 22°35′30″E
- Country: Poland
- Voivodeship: Lublin
- County: Janów
- Gmina: Dzwola

Kocudza Druga [kɔˈt͡sud͡za ˈdruɡa] is a village in the administrative district of Gmina Dzwola, within Janów County, Lublin Voivodeship, in eastern Poland.
