= Gabriela Masłowska =

Polish politician (born 1950)

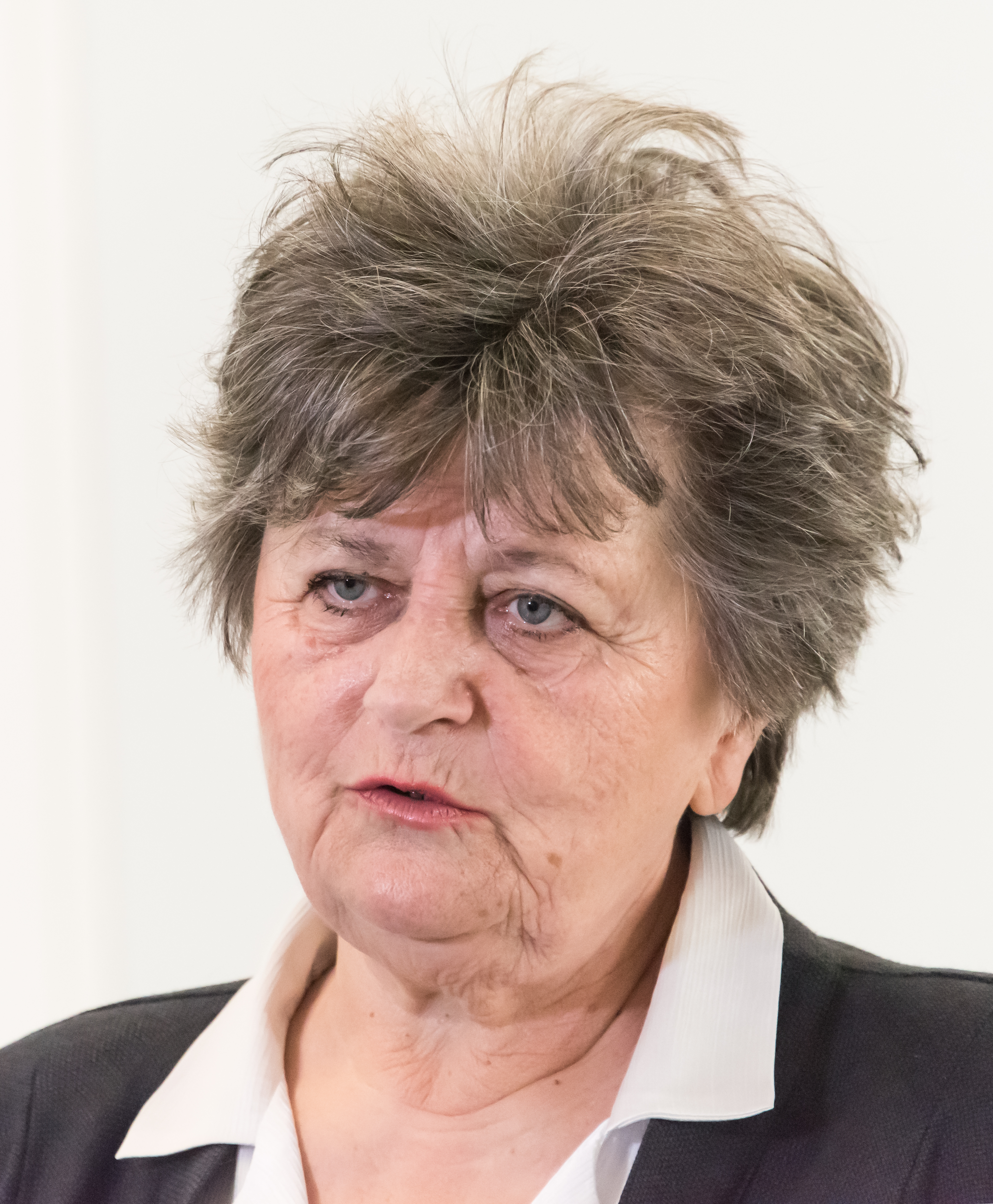

Member of the Sejm
- Incumbent
- Assumed office 25 September 2005
- Constituency: 6 – Lublin

Personal details
- Born: 27 June 1950 (age 75)
- Party: Law and Justice
- Other political affiliations: League of Polish Families (2005–7)

Gabriela Masłowska (born 27 June 1950 in Batorz) is a Polish politician. She was elected to the Sejm on 25 September 2005, getting 11,977 votes in 6 Lublin district as a candidate from the League of Polish Families list.

She was also a member of Sejm 2001-2005.

== See also ==
- Members of Polish Sejm 2005-2007
