= Ujście, Lublin Voivodeship =

Ujście
- Village
- Location within Poland
- Coordinates: 50°35′15″N 22°30′15″E
- Country: Poland
- Voivodeship: Lublin
- County: Janów
- Gmina: Janów Lubelski

Ujście [ˈui̯ɕt͡ɕɛ] is a village in the administrative district of Gmina Janów Lubelski, within Janów County, Lublin Voivodeship, in eastern Poland.
