= Zdzisławice, Lublin Voivodeship =

Zdzisławice
- Village
- Location within Poland
- Coordinates: 50°39′N 22°34′E
- Country: Poland
- Voivodeship: Lublin
- County: Janów
- Gmina: Dzwola
- Population: 410

Zdzisławice [zd͡ʑiswaˈvit͡sɛ] is a village in the administrative district of Gmina Dzwola, within Janów County, Lublin Voivodeship, in eastern Poland.
