= Michałówka, Janów County =

Michałówka
- Village
- Location within Poland
- Coordinates: 50°47′43″N 22°19′44″E
- Country: Poland
- Voivodeship: Lublin
- County: Janów
- Gmina: Modliborzyce
- Population: 150

Michałówka [mixaˈwufka] is a village in the administrative district of Gmina Modliborzyce, within Janów County, Lublin Voivodeship, in eastern Poland.
