= Węgliska =

Węgliska may refer to the following places:

- Węgliska, Lublin Voivodeship (east Poland)
- Węgliska, Pomeranian Voivodeship (north Poland)
- Węgliska, Subcarpathian Voivodeship (south-east Poland)
