= Zarajec =

- Village
- Location within Poland
- Coordinates: 50°48′N 22°18′E
- Country: Poland
- Voivodeship: Lublin
- County: Janów
- Gmina: Modliborzyce

Zarajec [zaˈrajɛt͡s] is a village in the administrative district of Gmina Modliborzyce, in the Janów County, Lublin Voivodeship, in eastern Poland.
