= Zofianka Dolna =

- Village
- Location within Poland
- Coordinates: 50°42′N 22°30′E
- Country: Poland
- Voivodeship: Lublin
- County: Janów
- Gmina: Dzwola

Zofianka Dolna [zɔˈfjaŋka ˈdɔlna] is a village in the administrative district of Gmina Dzwola, within Janów County, Lublin Voivodeship, in eastern Poland.
