= Potok-Stany Kolonia =

- Village
- Location within Poland
- Coordinates: 50°48′1″N 22°13′14″E
- Country: Poland
- Voivodeship: Lublin
- County: Janów
- Gmina: Potok Wielki

Potok-Stany Kolonia [ˈpɔtɔk ˈstanɨ kɔˈlɔɲa] is a village in the administrative district of Gmina Potok Wielki, within Janów County, Lublin Voivodeship, in eastern Poland.
