= Stawki, Janów County =

Stawki
- Village
- Location within Poland
- Coordinates: 50°46′25″N 22°10′39″E
- Country: Poland
- Voivodeship: Lublin
- County: Janów
- Gmina: Potok Wielki

Stawki [ˈstafki] is a village in the administrative district of Gmina Potok Wielki, within Janów County, Lublin Voivodeship, in eastern Poland.
