= Jonaki =

- Village
- Location within Poland
- Coordinates: 50°41′37″N 22°22′16″E
- Country: Poland
- Voivodeship: Lublin
- County: Janów
- Gmina: Janów Lubelski
- Population: 17

Jonaki [jɔˈnaki] is a village in the administrative district of Gmina Janów Lubelski, within Janów County, Lublin Voivodeship, in eastern Poland.
