= Zofianka Górna =

- Village
- Location within Poland
- Coordinates: 50°42′N 22°28′E
- Country: Poland
- Voivodeship: Lublin
- County: Janów
- Gmina: Janów Lubelski

Zofianka Górna [zɔˈfjaŋka ˈɡurna] is a village in the administrative district of Gmina Janów Lubelski, within Janów County, Lublin Voivodeship, in eastern Poland.
