= Branew =

- Village
- Location within Poland
- Coordinates: 50°45′N 22°34′E
- Country: Poland
- Voivodeship: Lublin
- County: Janów
- Gmina: Dzwola

Branew [ˈbranɛf] is a village in the administrative district of Gmina Dzwola, within Janów County, Lublin Voivodeship, in eastern Poland.
