= Gmina Batorz =

Gmina Batorz Batorz Commune
- Gmina
- Coat of arms
- Interactive map of Gmina Batorz
- Coordinates (Batorz): 50°51′N 22°29′E
- Country: Poland
- Voivodeship: Lublin
- County: Janów
- Seat: Batorz

Area
  - Total: 70.81 km^{2} (27.34 sq mi)

Population (2013)
  - Total: 3,442
  - Density: 48.61/km^{2} (125.9/sq mi)

Gmina Batorz is a rural gmina (administrative district) in Janów County, Lublin Voivodeship, in eastern Poland. Its seat is the village of Batorz, which lies approximately 16 kilometres (10 mi) north of Janów Lubelski and 45 km (28 mi) south of the regional capital Lublin.

The gmina covers an area of 70.81 square kilometres (27.3 sq mi), and as of 2006 its total population is 3,518 (3,442 in 2013).

== Villages ==
Gmina Batorz contains the villages and settlements of Aleksandrówka, Batorz, Błażek, Nowe Moczydła, Samary, Stawce, Stawce-Kolonia, Węglinek, Wola Studzieńska, Wola Studzieńska-Kolonia, and Wólka Batorska.

== Neighbouring gminas ==
Gmina Batorz is bordered by the gminas of Godziszów, Modliborzyce, Szastarka, Zakrzew, and Zakrzówek.
