= Gmina Godziszów =

Gmina Godziszów Godziszów Commune
- Gmina
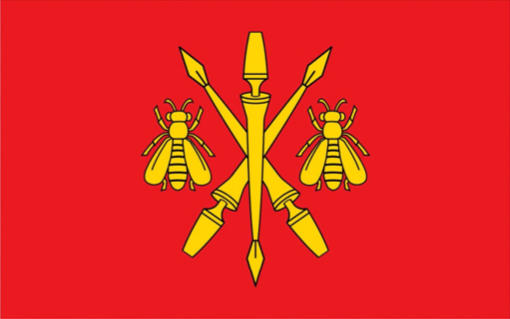
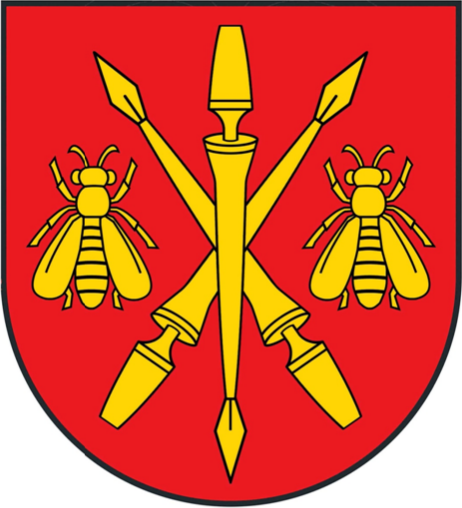
- Flag Coat of arms
- Interactive map of Gmina Godziszów
- Coordinates (Godziszów): 50°45′9″N 22°29′6″E
- Country: Poland
- Voivodeship: Lublin
- County: Janów
- Seat: Godziszów

Area
  - Total: 101.68 km^{2} (39.26 sq mi)

Population (2013)
  - Total: 6,108
  - Density: 60.07/km^{2} (155.6/sq mi)
- Website: http://www.godziszow.pl/

Gmina Godziszów is a rural gmina (administrative district) in Janów County, Lublin Voivodeship, in eastern Poland. Its seat is the village of Godziszów, which lies approximately 7 kilometres (4 mi) north-east of Janów Lubelski and 56 km (35 mi) south of the regional capital Lublin.

The gmina covers an area of 101.68 square kilometres (39.3 sq mi), and as of 2006 its total population is 6,277 (6,108 in 2013).

== Villages ==
Gmina Godziszów contains the villages and settlements of Andrzejów, Godziszów, Kawęczyn, Piłatka, Rataj Ordynacki, Rataj Poduchowny, Wólka Ratajska and Zdziłowice.

== Neighbouring gminas ==
Gmina Godziszów is bordered by the gminas of Batorz, Chrzanów, Dzwola, Janów Lubelski, Modliborzyce and Zakrzew.
