= Bilsko, Lublin Voivodeship =

Bilsko
- Village
- Location within Poland
- Coordinates: 50°45′58″N 22°24′30″E
- Country: Poland
- Voivodeship: Lublin
- County: Janów
- Gmina: Modliborzyce

Bilsko [ˈbilskɔ] is a village in the administrative district of Gmina Modliborzyce, within Janów County, Lublin Voivodeship, in eastern Poland.
