= Osinki, Lublin Voivodeship =

Osinki
- Village
- Location within Poland
- Coordinates: 50°48′19″N 22°11′24″E
- Country: Poland
- Voivodeship: Lublin
- County: Janów
- Gmina: Potok Wielki

Osinki [ɔˈɕiŋki] is a village in the administrative district of Gmina Potok Wielki, within Janów County, Lublin Voivodeship, in eastern Poland.
