= Słupie, Lublin Voivodeship =

Słupie
- Village
- Location within Poland
- Coordinates: 50°45′18″N 22°18′29″E
- Country: Poland
- Voivodeship: Lublin
- County: Janów
- Gmina: Modliborzyce
- Time zone: UTC+1 (CET)
  - Summer (DST): UTC+2 (CEST)

Słupie [ˈswupjɛ] is a village in the administrative district of Gmina Modliborzyce, within Janów County, Lublin Voivodeship, in eastern Poland.

== History ==
Three Polish citizens were murdered by Nazi Germany in the village during World War II.
