= Dąbrówka, Janów County =

Dąbrówka
- Village
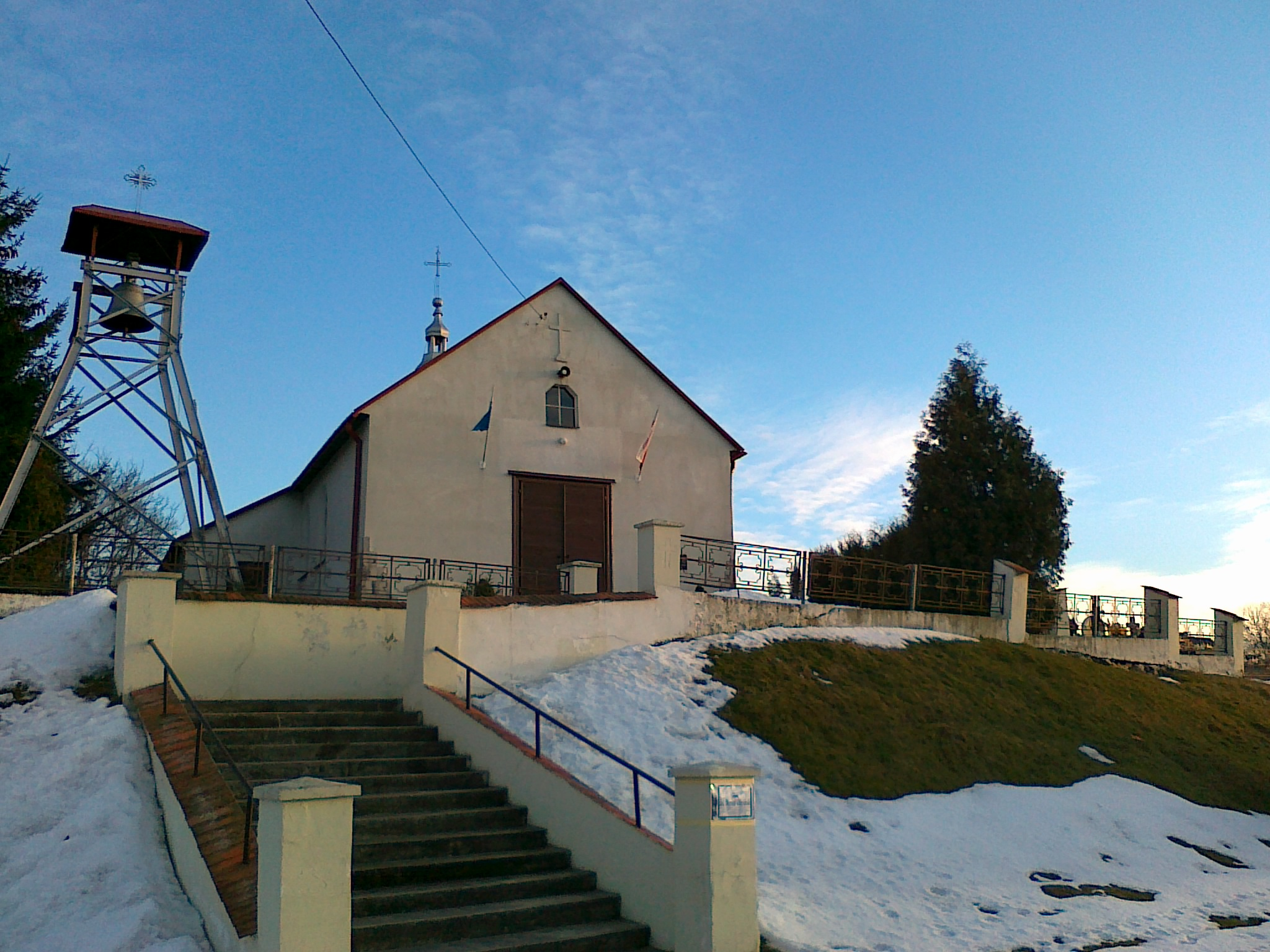
- Catholic Church in Dąbrówka

- Location within Poland
- Coordinates: 50°49′14″N 22°13′46″E
- Country: Poland
- Voivodeship: Lublin
- County: Janów
- Gmina: Potok Wielki

Dąbrówka [dɔmˈbrufka] is a village in the administrative district of Gmina Potok Wielki, within Janów County, Lublin Voivodeship, in eastern Poland.
