= Samary, Poland =

Samary
- Village
- Location within Poland
- Coordinates: 50°51′31″N 22°25′6″E
- Country: Poland
- Voivodeship: Lublin
- County: Janów
- Gmina: Batorz

Population
  - Total: 180

Samary [saˈmarɨ] is a village in the administrative district of Gmina Batorz, within Janów County, Lublin Voivodeship, in eastern Poland.
