= Piłatka, Lublin Voivodeship =

Piłatka
- Village
- Location within Poland
- Coordinates: 50°48′N 22°28′E
- Country: Poland
- Voivodeship: Lublin
- County: Janów
- Gmina: Godziszów
- Population: 390

Piłatka [piˈwatka] is a village in the administrative district of Gmina Godziszów, within Janów County, Lublin Voivodeship, in eastern Poland.
