= Węgliska, Lublin Voivodeship =

Węgliska
- Village
- Location within Poland
- Coordinates: 50°47′57″N 22°26′20″E
- Country: Poland
- Voivodeship: Lublin
- County: Janów
- Gmina: Modliborzyce

Węgliska [vɛŋˈɡliska] is a village in the administrative district of Gmina Modliborzyce, within Janów County, Lublin Voivodeship, in eastern Poland.
