= Osówek, Lublin Voivodeship =

Osówek
- Village
- Location within Poland
- Coordinates: 50°41′N 22°13′E
- Country: Poland
- Voivodeship: Lublin
- County: Janów
- Gmina: Potok Wielki

Osówek [ɔˈsuvɛk] is a village in the administrative district of Gmina Potok Wielki, within Janów County, Lublin Voivodeship, in eastern Poland.
