= Gmina Janów Lubelski =

Gmina Janów Lubelski Janów Lubelski Commune
- Gmina
- Coat of arms
- Interactive map of Gmina Janów Lubelski
- Coordinates (Janów Lubelski): 50°43′N 22°25′E
- Country: Poland
- Voivodeship: Lublin
- County: Janów
- Seat: Janów Lubelski

Area
  - Total: 178.24 km^{2} (68.82 sq mi)

Population (2013)
  - Total: 16,272
  - Density: 91.293/km^{2} (236.45/sq mi)
  - Urban: 12,092
  - Rural: 4,180
- Website: https://www.janowlubelski.pl/

Gmina Janów Lubelski is an urban-rural gmina (administrative district) in Janów County, Lublin Voivodeship, in eastern Poland. Its seat is the town of Janów Lubelski, which lies approximately 60 kilometres (37 mi) south of the regional capital Lublin.

The gmina covers an area of 178.24 square kilometres (68.8 sq mi), and as of 2006 its total population is 16,106 (out of which the population of Janów Lubelski amounts to 11,938, and the population of the rural part of the gmina is 4,168).

== Villages ==
Apart from the town of Janów Lubelski, Gmina Janów Lubelski contains the villages and settlements of Biała Druga, Biała Pierwsza, Borownica, Cegielnia, Jonaki, Kiszki, Kopce, Łążek Garncarski, Łążek Ordynacki, Momoty Dolne, Momoty Górne, Pikule, Ruda, Szewce, Szklarnia, Ujście and Zofianka Górna.

== Neighbouring gminas ==
Gmina Janów Lubelski is bordered by the gminas of Biłgoraj, Dzwola, Godziszów, Harasiuki, Jarocin, Modliborzyce and Pysznica.
