= Potok Wielki, Lublin Voivodeship =

Potok Wielki
- Village
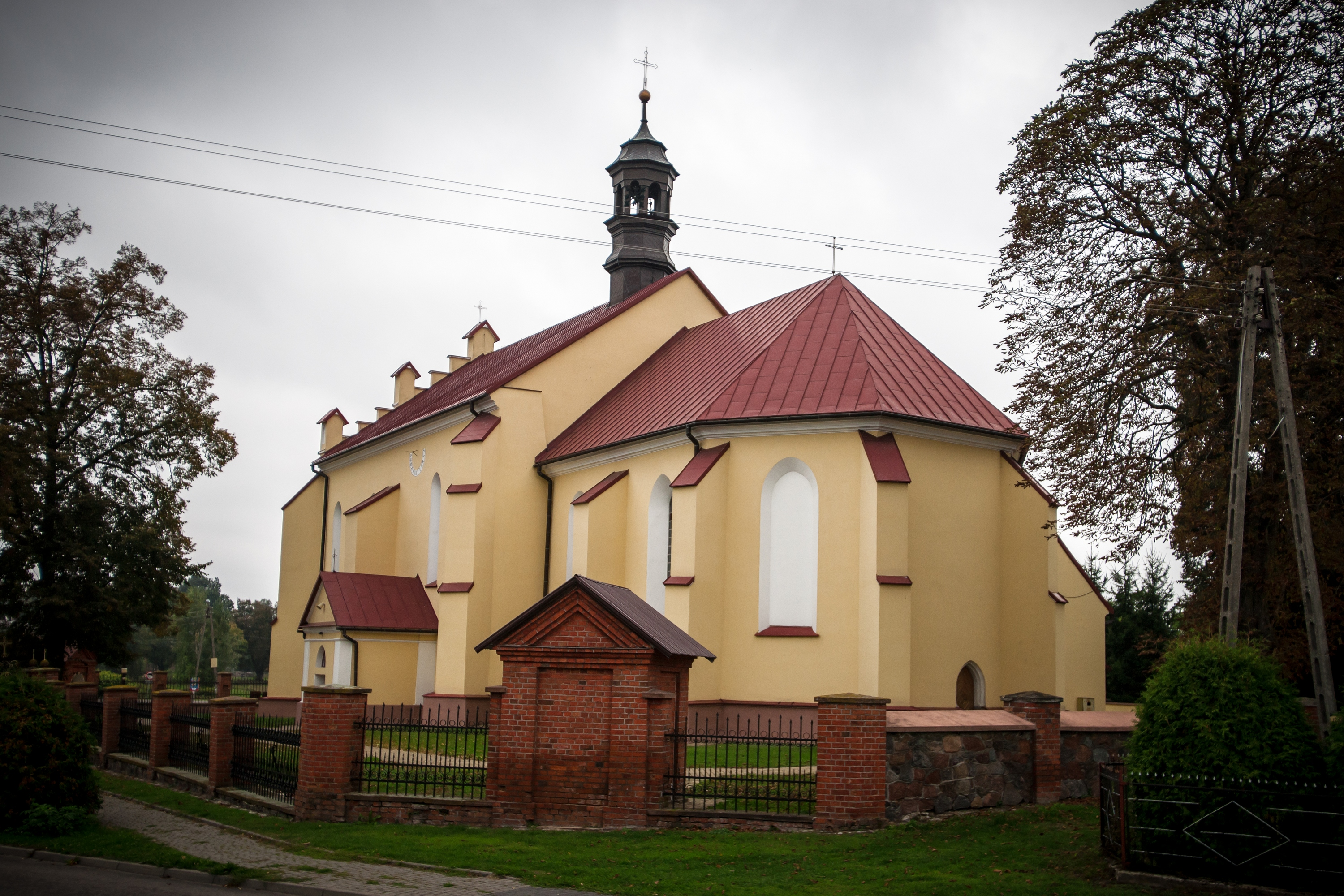
- Saint Nicholas church in Potok Wielki

- Location within Poland
- Coordinates: 50°47′27″N 22°12′56″E
- Country: Poland
- Voivodeship: Lublin
- County: Janów
- Gmina: Potok Wielki

Population
  - Total: 502
- Time zone: UTC+1 (CET)
  - Summer (DST): UTC+2 (CEST)
- Vehicle registration: LJA

Potok Wielki (Polish pronunciation: [ˈpɔtɔk ˈvjɛlkʲi]) is a village in Janów County, Lublin Voivodeship, in eastern Poland. It is the seat of the gmina (administrative district) called Gmina Potok Wielki.
