= Lute, Poland =

Lute
- Village
- Location within Poland
- Coordinates: 50°46′N 22°20′E
- Country: Poland
- Voivodeship: Lublin
- County: Janów
- Gmina: Modliborzyce

Lute [ˈlutɛ] is a village in the administrative district of Gmina Modliborzyce, within Janów County, Lublin Voivodeship, in eastern Poland.
