= Kyiv Art Institute =

Art school in Ukraine

The Kyiv Art Institute (abbr. KKhI, Ukrainian: Київський художній інститут, КХІ; Russian: Киевский художественный институт, КХИ; 1924–1930) was the Ukrainian state art and technical high school which is the historical inheritor of Ukrainian Academy of Arts which was founded at December 5, 1917, in Kyiv by the Central Rada of Ukrainian People's Republic. During the Soviet era, the name of the institution changed several times. Kyiv Art Institute appeared as a result of reorganization and merger of Institute of Plastic Arts (1922–1924) and Ukrainian Institute of Architecture (1918–1924). In 1925 KKhI got a new building of former Kyiv Theological Seminary (where it is located today as National Academy of Visual Arts and Architecture) this helped to open new departments: film and photography, printing, sculpture and pedagogical.

The development the KKhI was facilitated by the activity of rector Ivan Vrona, who was updating its pedagogical staff in 1924–1930. He invited famous avant-garde artists such as Kazimir Malevich, Vladimir Tatlin, Victor Palmov, Pavel Golubyatnikov, and turned Kyiv Art Institute into one of the most progressive higher education institutions in Europe in the 1920s, along with the Bauhaus. In addition, at the KHI already had been teaching: Mykhailo Boychuk, Alexander Bogomazov, Fedir Krychevsky, Vadym Meller, Sophiya Nalepinska-Boychuk, Leo Kramarenko, Vasyl Krichevsky, Andriy Taran. The Kyiv Art Institute played a significant role in maintaining the art avant-garde movement in Ukraine in the 1920s. In 1930 the institute was reorganized into the Institute of Proletarian Culture (1930–1934) in which teaching was conducted only in line with socialist realism.
