= Gmina Dzwola =

Gmina Dzwola Dzwola Commune
- Gmina
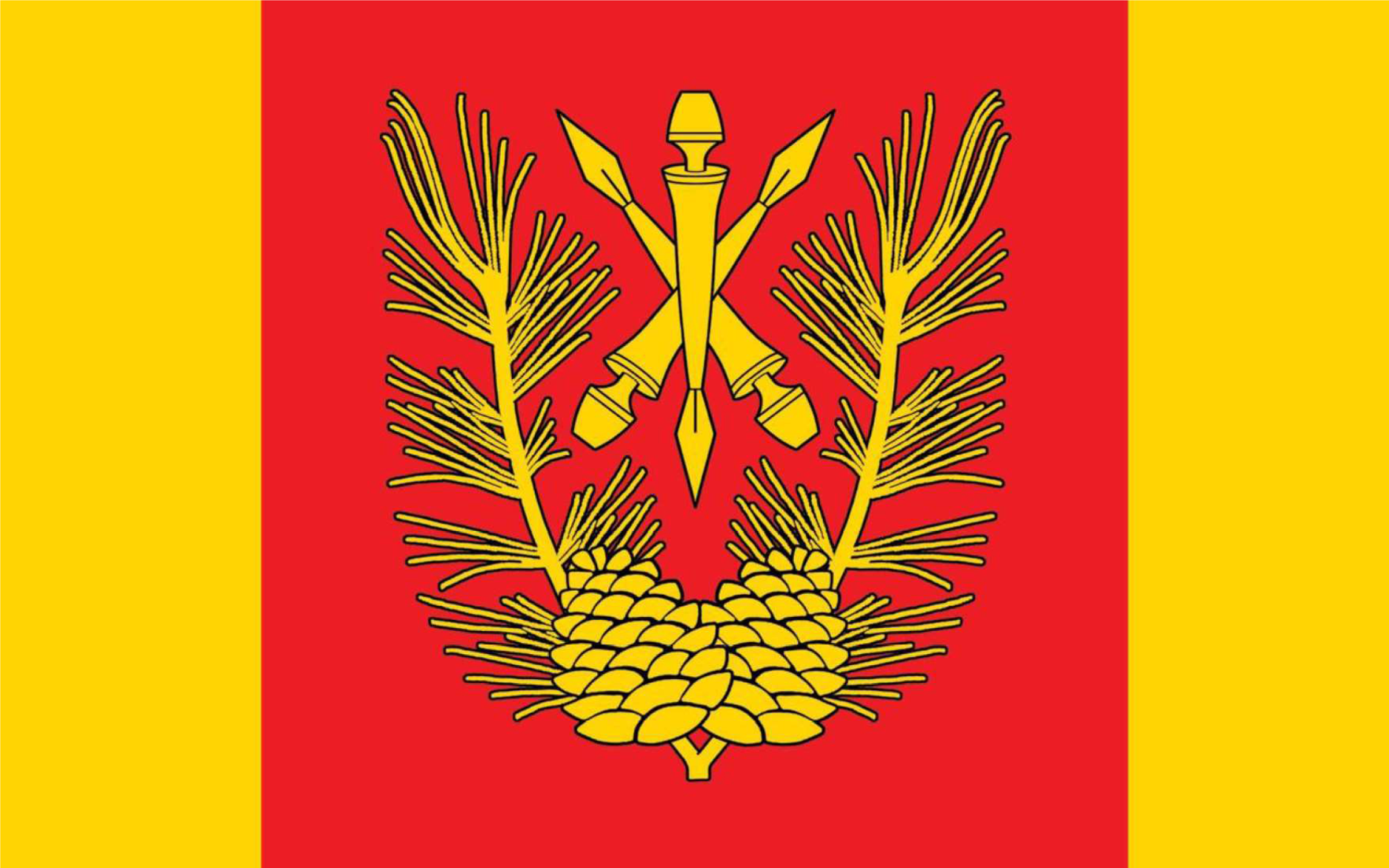
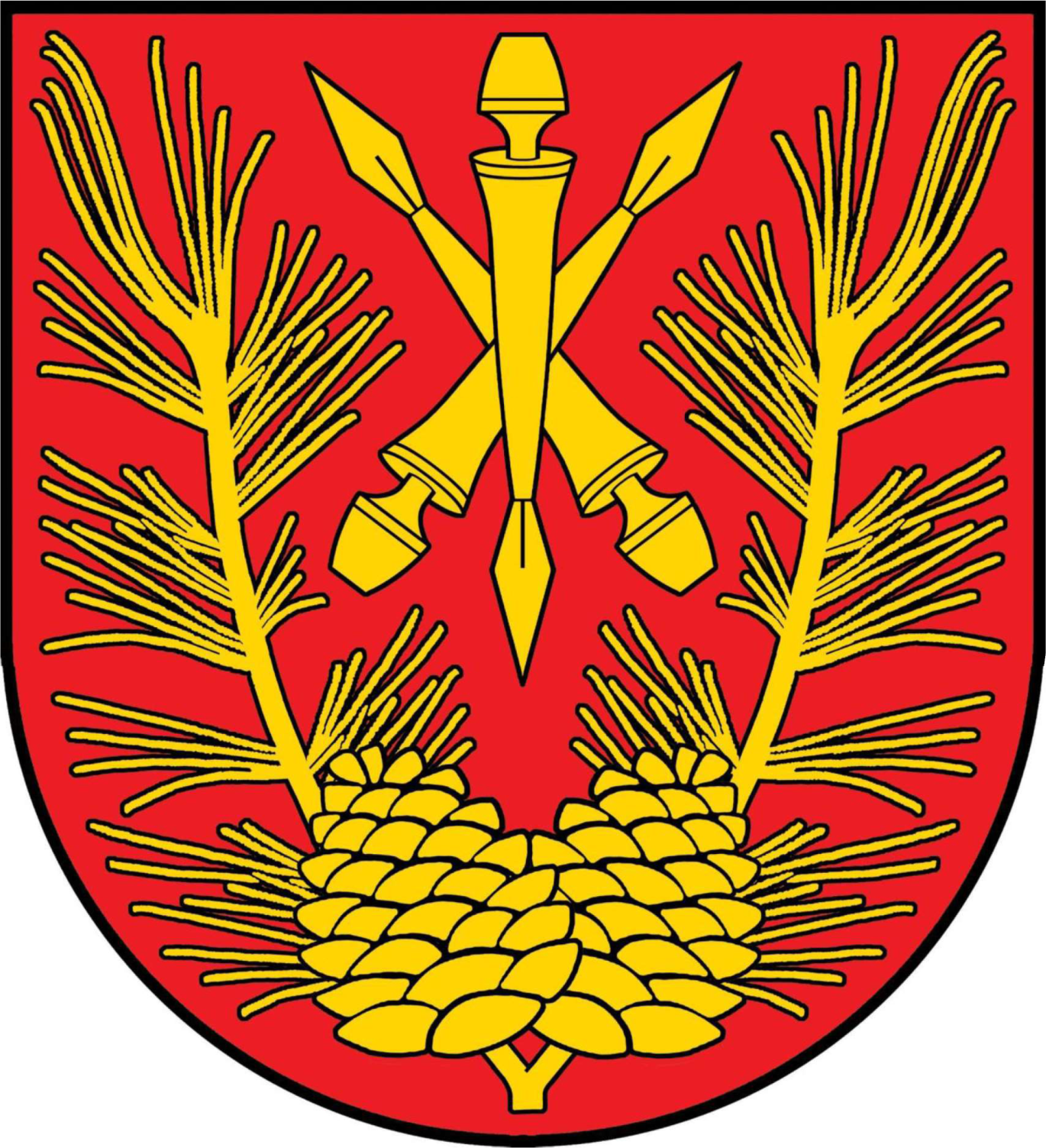
- Flag Coat of arms
- Interactive map of Gmina Dzwola
- Coordinates (Dzwola): 50°42′N 22°34′E
- Country: Poland
- Voivodeship: Lublin
- County: Janów
- Seat: Dzwola

Area
  - Total: 203.1 km^{2} (78.4 sq mi)

Population (2013)
  - Total: 6,514
  - Density: 32.07/km^{2} (83.07/sq mi)
- Website: www.dzwola.lubelskie.pl

Gmina Dzwola is a rural gmina (administrative district) in Janów County, Lublin Voivodeship, in eastern Poland. Its seat is the village of Dzwola, which lies approximately 11 kilometres (7 mi) east of Janów Lubelski and 61 km (38 mi) south of the regional capital Lublin.

The gmina covers an area of 203.1 square kilometres (78.4 sq mi), and as of 2006 its total population is 6,664 (6,514 in 2013).

== Villages ==
Gmina Dzwola contains the villages and settlements of Branew, Branewka, Branewka-Kolonia, Dzwola, Flisy, Kapronie, Kocudza Druga, Kocudza Górna, Kocudza Pierwsza, Kocudza Trzecia, Konstantów, Krzemień Drugi, Krzemień Pierwszy, Władysławów, Zdzisławice and Zofianka Dolna.

== Neighbouring gminas ==
Gmina Dzwola is bordered by the gminas of Biłgoraj, Chrzanów, Frampol, Godziszów, Goraj and Janów Lubelski.
