= Ciechocin, Lublin Voivodeship =

Ciechocin
- Village
- Location within Poland
- Coordinates: 50°42′N 22°19′E
- Country: Poland
- Voivodeship: Lublin
- County: Janów
- Gmina: Modliborzyce

Ciechocin [t͡ɕɛˈxɔt͡ɕin] is a village in the administrative district of Gmina Modliborzyce, within Janów County, Lublin Voivodeship, in eastern Poland.
