= Mykhailo Derehus =

Ukrainian graphic artist, painter and educator

Mykhailo Hordiiovych Derehus (Ukrainian: Дерегус Михайло Гордійович; born December 5, 1904, Vesele, Kharkovsky Uyezd, Kharkov Governorate, Russian Empire — July 31, 1997, Kyiv, Ukraine) was a Soviet Ukrainian graphic artist, painter and educator. In 1969 he was awarded the Shevchenko National Prize. His work is held in the collection of the Kuindzhi Art Museum, Mariupol, Ukraine.

== Life and work ==
Derehus' expressionist lithographs illustrated the 1936 edition of Ivan Kotliarevsky's Eneïda. He also illustrated the works of Nikolai Gogol, Lesya Ukrainka, Marko Vovchok, and Natan Rybak.

He was Chairman of the National Union of Artists of Ukraine from 1955 to 1962.

== Awards ==
- 1969: Shevchenko National Prize

== Legacy ==
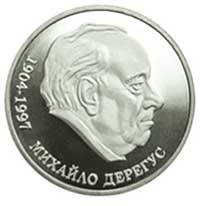
A ₴2 coin commemorating Derehus.

A bronze plaque at 9 Volodymyrska Street, Kyiv, commemorates where Derehus lived from 1973 to 1997.

On 25 October 2004, the National Bank of Ukraine put into circulation a commemorative coin with a face value of ₴2, dedicated to the 100th anniversary of the birth of Deregus.

In 2019, a street in Kyiv was named after him.

== Collections ==
Derehus' work is held in the following permanent collections:

- Kuindzhi Art Museum, Mariupol, Ukraine
- National Museum Taras Shevchenko, Kyiv, Ukraine

== General references ==
- Mykhailo Hordiiovych Derehus (1958) by Ivan Vrona
- Derehus. Oforty = Derehus. Etchings (1971) by I. M. Verba
- Художники України : 100 видатних імен / Khudoz︠h︡nyky Ukraïny : 100 vydatnykh imen = Artists of Ukraine: 100 prominent names. Kyiv: ArtEk, 2007. By Igor Sharov and Anatoly Tolstoukhov. ISBN 9789665051343.
