= Henryk Suchora =

Polish politician (1951–2024)

Member of the Sejm
- In office 25 November 1991 – 31 May 1993

Personal details
- Born: 19 February 1951 Osinki, Poland
- Died: 15 October 2024 (aged 73)
- Party: PSL-PL
- Occupation: Farmer

Henryk Suchora (19 February 1951 – 15 October 2024) was a Polish politician. A member of the Peasants' Agreement, he served in the Sejm from 1991 to 1993.

Suchora died on 15 October 2024, at the age of 73.
