= Malinie, Lublin Voivodeship =

Malinie
- Village
- Location within Poland
- Coordinates: 50°45′N 22°38′E
- Country: Poland
- Voivodeship: Lublin
- County: Janów
- Gmina: Chrzanów

Malinie [maˈliɲɛ] is a village in the administrative district of Gmina Chrzanów, within Janów County, Lublin Voivodeship, in eastern Poland.
