= Chrzanów, Lublin Voivodeship =

Chrzanów
- Village
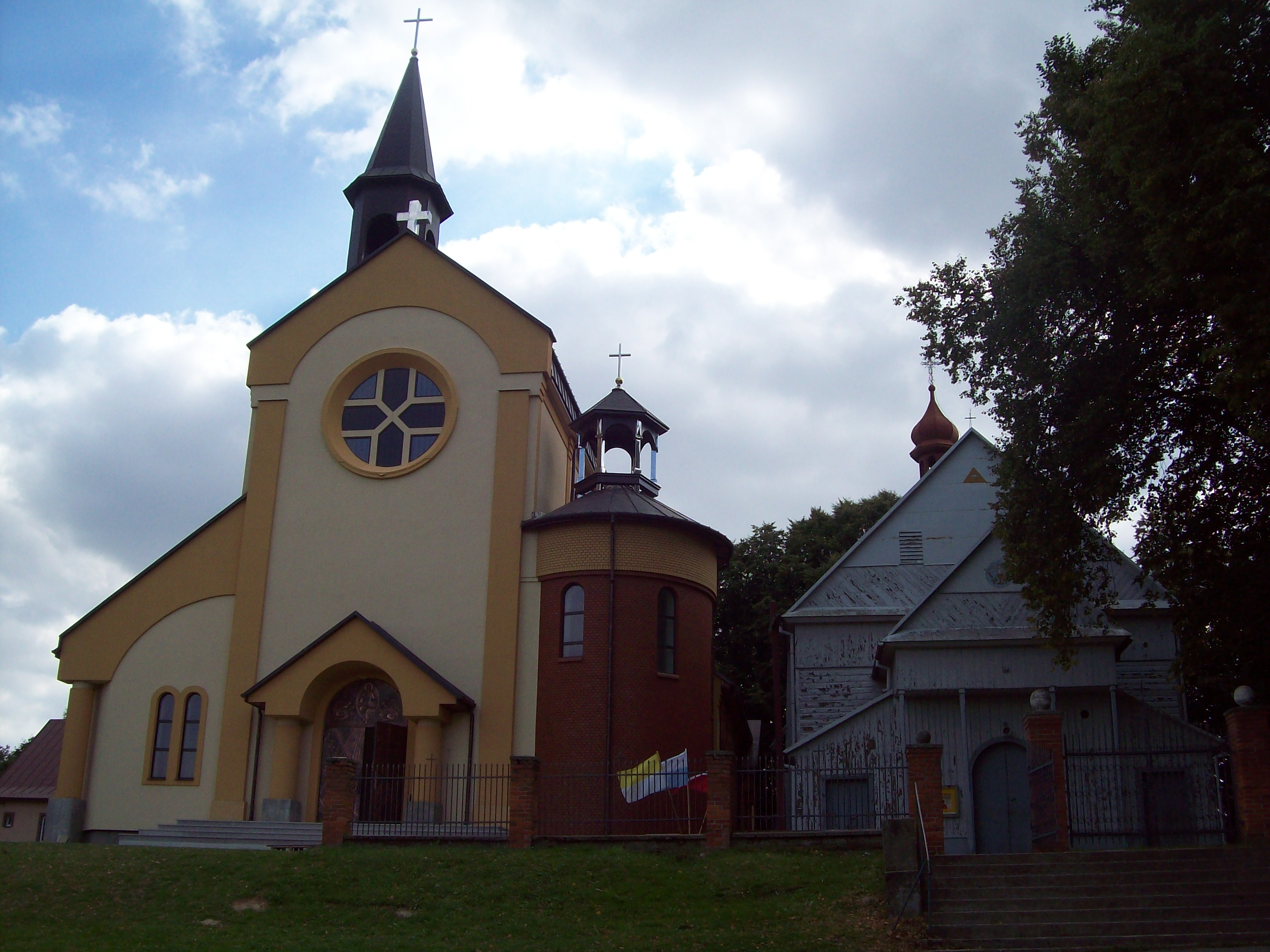
- Saint Hyacinth church in Chrzanów

- Location within Poland
- Coordinates: 50°46′26″N 22°36′19″E
- Country: Poland
- Voivodeship: Lublin
- County: Janów
- Gmina: Chrzanów

Population
  - Total: 1,760
- Time zone: UTC+1 (CET)
  - Summer (DST): UTC+2 (CEST)
- Vehicle registration: LJA

Chrzanów [ˈxʂanuf] is a village in Janów County, Lublin Voivodeship, in eastern Poland. It is the seat of the gmina (administrative district) called Gmina Chrzanów.
