= Gmina Modliborzyce =

Gmina Modliborzyce Modliborzyce Commune
- Gmina
- Flag Coat of arms
- Interactive map of Gmina Modliborzyce
- Coordinates (Modliborzyce): 50°45′9″N 22°19′46″E
- Country: Poland
- Voivodeship: Lublin
- County: Janów
- Seat: Modliborzyce

Area
  - Total: 153.15 km^{2} (59.13 sq mi)

Population (2013)
  - Total: 7,126
  - Density: 46.53/km^{2} (120.5/sq mi)
- Website: http://www.modliborzyce.pl

Gmina Modliborzyce is a rural gmina (administrative district) in Janów County, Lublin Voivodeship, in eastern Poland. Its seat is the village of Modliborzyce, which lies approximately 8 kilometres (5 mi) north-west of Janów Lubelski and 58 km (36 mi) south of the regional capital Lublin.

The gmina covers an area of 153.15 square kilometres (59.1 sq mi). As of 2006, its total population is 7,239 (7,126 in 2013).

== Villages ==
Gmina Modliborzyce contains the villages and settlements of Antolin, Bilsko, Brzeziny, Ciechocin, Dąbie, Felinów, Gwizdów, Kalenne, Kolonia Zamek, Lute, Majdan, Michałówka, Modliborzyce, Pasieka, Słupie, Stojeszyn Drugi, Stojeszyn Pierwszy, Stojeszyn-Kolonia, Świnki, Węgliska, Wierzchowiska Drugie, Wierzchowiska Pierwsze, Wolica Druga, Wolica Pierwsza and Zarajec.

== Neighbouring gminas ==
Gmina Modliborzyce is bordered by the gminas of Batorz, Godziszów, Janów Lubelski, Potok Wielki, Pysznica and Szastarka.
