= Gmina Potok Wielki =

Gmina Potok Wielki Potok Wielki Commune
- Gmina
- Interactive map of Gmina Potok Wielki
- Coordinates (Potok Wielki): 50°47′27″N 22°12′56″E
- Country: Poland
- Voivodeship: Lublin
- County: Janów
- Seat: Potok Wielki

Area
  - Total: 98.33 km^{2} (37.97 sq mi)

Population (2013)
  - Total: 4,819
  - Density: 49.01/km^{2} (126.9/sq mi)
- Website: http://www.potokwielki.pl

Gmina Potok Wielki is a rural gmina (administrative district) in Janów County, Lublin Voivodeship, in eastern Poland. Its seat is the village of Potok Wielki, which lies approximately 17 kilometres (11 mi) north-west of Janów Lubelski and 57 km (35 mi) south-west of the regional capital Lublin.

The gmina covers an area of 98.33 square kilometres (38.0 sq mi), and as of 2006 its total population is 4,954 (4,819 in 2013).

== Villages ==
Gmina Potok Wielki contains the villages and settlements of Dąbrowica, Dąbrówka, Kolonia Potok Wielki, Maliniec, Osinki, Osówek, Popielarnia, Potoczek, Potok Wielki, Potok Wielki Drugi, Potok-Stany, Potok-Stany Kolonia, Radwanówka, Stany Nowe, Stawki, Wola Potocka and Zarajec Potocki.

== Neighbouring gminas ==
Gmina Potok Wielki is bordered by the gminas of Modliborzyce, Pysznica, Szastarka, Trzydnik Duży and Zaklików.
