= Potoczek, Janów County =

Potoczek
- Village
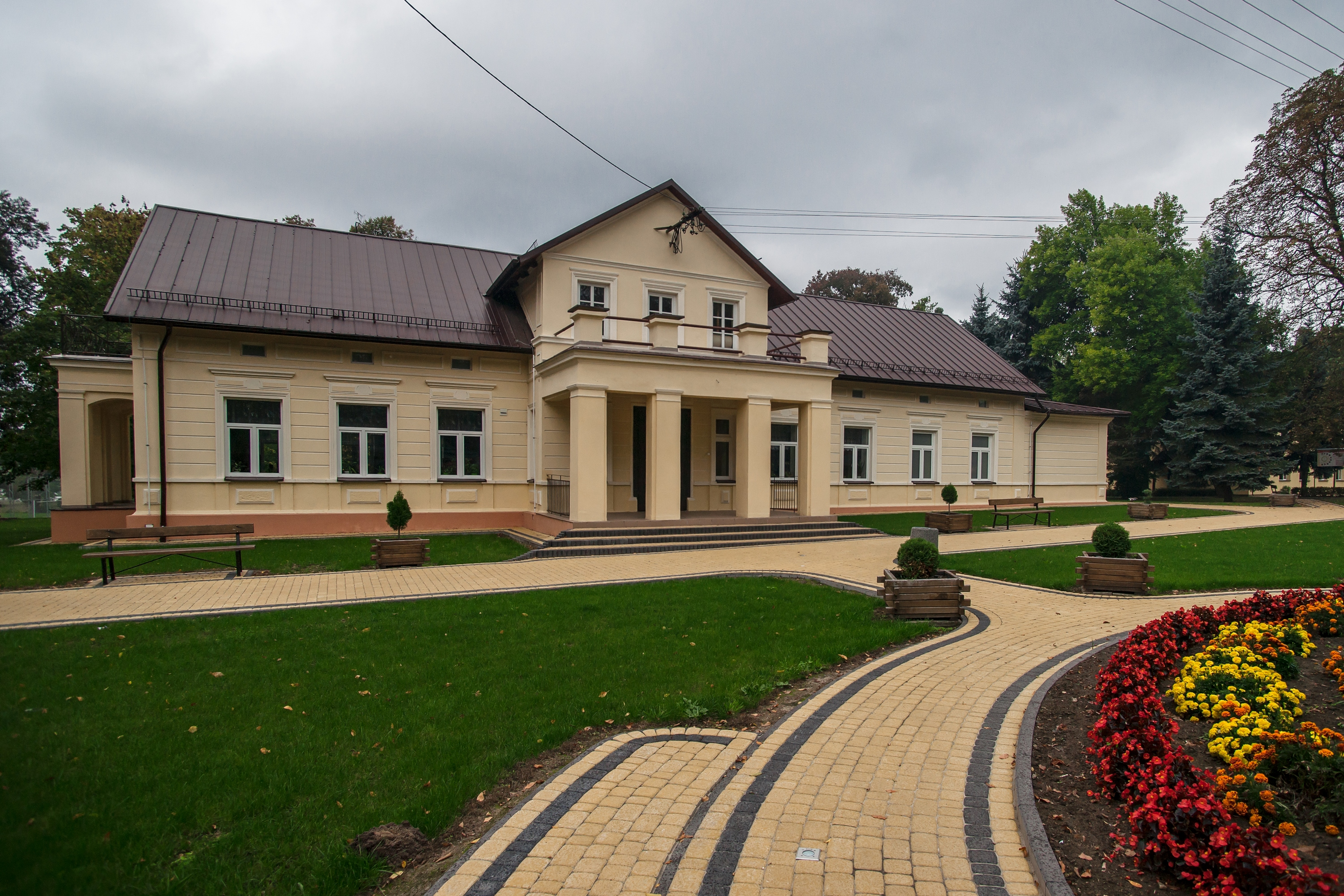
- Przanowski Manor in Potoczek

- Location within Poland
- Coordinates: 50°45′N 22°13′E
- Country: Poland
- Voivodeship: Lublin
- County: Janów
- Gmina: Potok Wielki
- Time zone: UTC+1 (CET)
  - Summer (DST): UTC+2 (CEST)
- Vehicle registration: LJA

Potoczek [pɔˈtɔt͡ʂɛk] is a village in the administrative district of Gmina Potok Wielki, within Janów County, Lublin Voivodeship, in eastern Poland.
