= Franklin W. Lutes =

- Born: 1840; Oneida County, New York
- Died: April 6, 1915 (aged 74–75)
- Military career
- Allegiance: United States of America; Union
- Branch: United States Army; Union Army
- Rank: Corporal
- Units: (New York (state)) Company D, 111th New York Volunteer Infantry Regiment
- Conflicts: American Civil War
- Awards: Medal of Honor

Franklin W. Lutes (1840 – April 6, 1915) was a soldier in the Union Army and a Medal of Honor recipient for his actions in the American Civil War.

Lutes enlisted in the Army from Geddes, New York in March 1864. Serving with the 111th New York Infantry, he was captured at the Second Battle of Ream's Station, but later paroled and promoted to Corporal. When his regiment disbanded in 1865, he was transferred to the 4th US Artillery Regiment.

== Medal of Honor citation ==
Rank and organization: Corporal, Company D, 111th New York Infantry. Place and date: At Petersburg, Va., March 31, 1865. Entered service at: ------. Birth: Oneida County, N.Y. Date of issue: April 3, 1865.

Citation:

Capture of flag of 41st Alabama Infantry (C.S.A.), together with the color bearer and one of the color guard.

== See also ==
- List of Medal of Honor recipients
- List of American Civil War Medal of Honor recipients: G–L
