= Otrocz =

- Village
- Location within Poland
- Coordinates: 50°49′N 22°34′E
- Country: Poland
- Voivodeship: Lublin
- County: Janów
- Gmina: Chrzanów

Otrocz [ˈɔtrɔt͡ʂ] is a village in the administrative district of Gmina Chrzanów, within Janów County, Lublin Voivodeship, in eastern Poland.

History of Otrocz. The village of Otroch was founded in the 10th century by Princess Olga to protect the western borders of Rus'. Olga sent her squad to these places, led by her beloved youth (rus: "отрок" - Otrok), from where the name of the village came from. Earlier in these places there was a princely estate, an Orthodox monastery. But over time, they were lost: only the Prince's Lake remained from the estate, and an Orthodox church was built on the site of the monastery, which was turned into a church in the 20th century.

For a whole millennium, the village of Otroch was inhabited exclusively by the Russian population. The villagers themselves (the otrochaks) always called themselves "Russians". Despite the fact that the surrounding villages were predominantly populated by Poles of the Catholic faith, Otroch, until the beginning of the 20th century, retained a 100% Russian and Orthodox population. And only during the First World War, when many residents were forced to temporarily leave their native village to the east (to the Kazan province), empty houses began to be captured by Poles from neighboring villages. This was the first resettlement of the inhabitants of Otroch to Russia.

The otrochaks who returned in 1921-1922 were forced to put up with uninvited new residents. During the Second World War (1939-1945), the inhabitants of Otrocz fought against both the Polish soldiers and the Nazi invaders. A partisan underground was organized. Many residents of Otroch hid at home and in the forests the soldiers of the Red Army who had fled from German captivity. In the fall of 1942, the Nazis managed to arrest many organizers of the partisan underground (in particular, the partisan leader Osip Vrona) and shot them. Now there are memorial graves at the place where the heroes died.

Now there are memorial graves at the place where the heroes died. After the end of the Second World War, the inhabitants of the village of Otroch did not want to remain part of Poland, as the Polish authorities began to intensively Polonize the population. The inhabitants of Otroch turned to the Soviet Government with a request to provide them with a new place for settlement on the territory of the USSR. This request was granted, and almost the entire village moved to the territory of Western Ukraine. However, conflicts with the local population also began to arise there. Therefore, part of the otrochaks went back to the Kazan region, part moved to the southeastern regions of Ukraine (Odesa region, Mykolaiv region, Crimea).

The uniqueness of the village of Otroch lies in the fact that for a thousand years its inhabitants have managed not to lose, to preserve the language, customs, rituals, songs, folklore, their clothes, ancient Russian from the time of the first Russian princes. You can learn about all this in detail in the book by Pavel Volynkin (the grandson of one of the otrochaks - Pavel Vrona) "Otroch - the lost ancestral home. The Big Crow's Nest".
