= Lutes (surname) =

Lutes is a surname. Notable people with the surname include:

- Della T. Lutes (1867–1942), an American writer, editor, and expert on cooking and housekeeping
- Eric Lutes (born 1962), an American actor
- Franklin W. Lutes (1840–1915), a United States Army soldier
- Jason Lutes (born 1967), an American comics creator
- LeRoy Lutes (1890–1980), a decorated American military officer
- Nettie Cronise Lutes (1843–1923), the first woman admitted to the bar in Ohio
- Rob Lutes (born 1968), a Canadian folk and blues musician
- Scott Lutes (born 1962), a Canadian Paralympic sailor
