= Batorz =

- Village
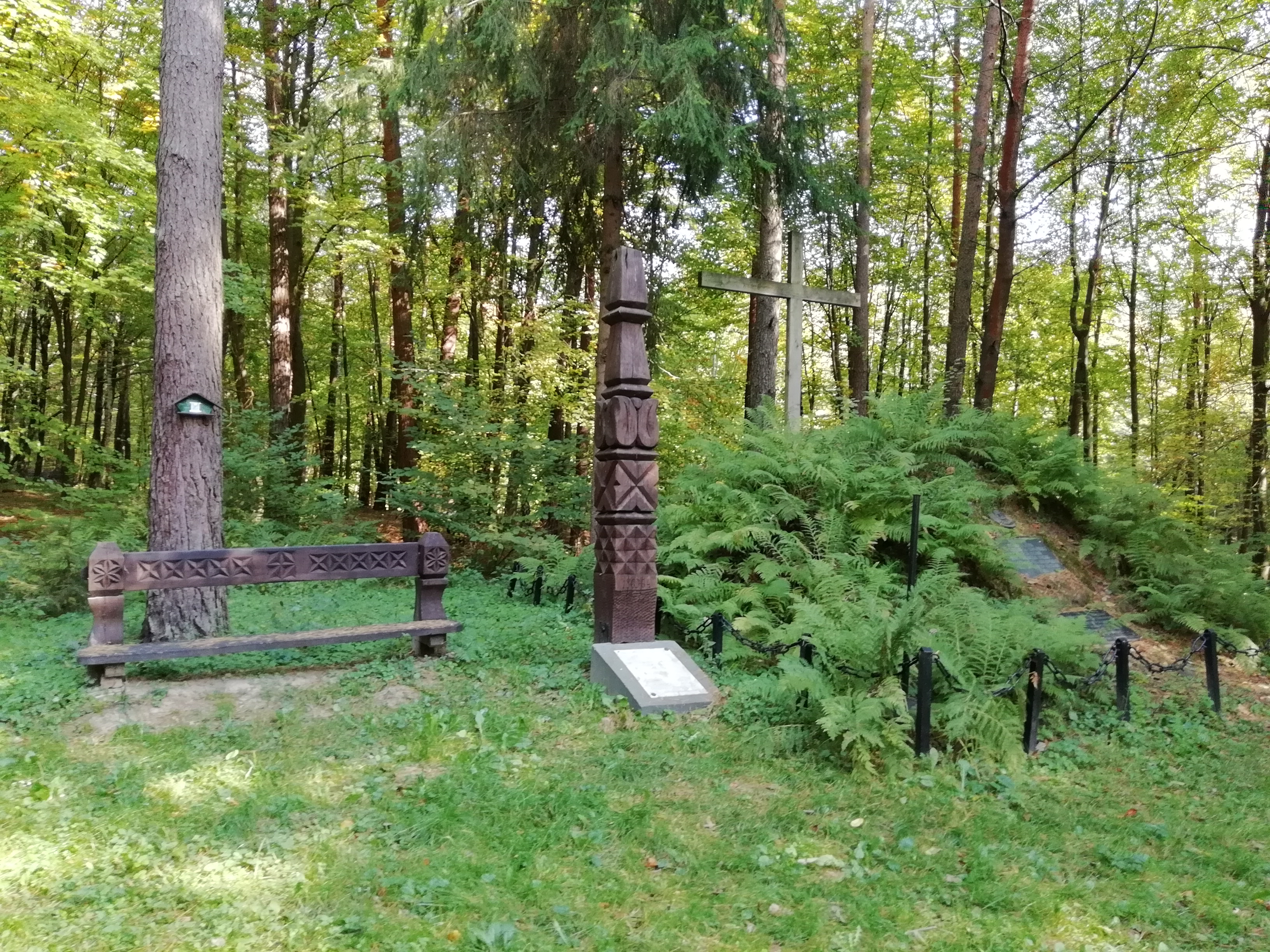
- Memorial mound to the insurgents fallen in the Battle of Sowia Góra in 1863

- Location within Poland
- Coordinates: 50°51′N 22°29′E
- Country: Poland
- Voivodeship: Lublin
- County: Janów
- Gmina: Batorz

Population
  - Total: 982
- Time zone: UTC+1 (CET)
  - Summer (DST): UTC+2 (CEST)
- Vehicle registration: LJA

Batorz [ˈbatɔʂ] is a village in Janów County, Lublin Voivodeship, in eastern Poland. It is the seat of the gmina (administrative district) called Gmina Batorz.

During the January Uprising, on 6 September 1863, the Battle of Sowia Góra was fought nearby, in which Polish insurgents and Hungarian volunteers were defeated by Russian troops.
