= Dzwola =

- Village
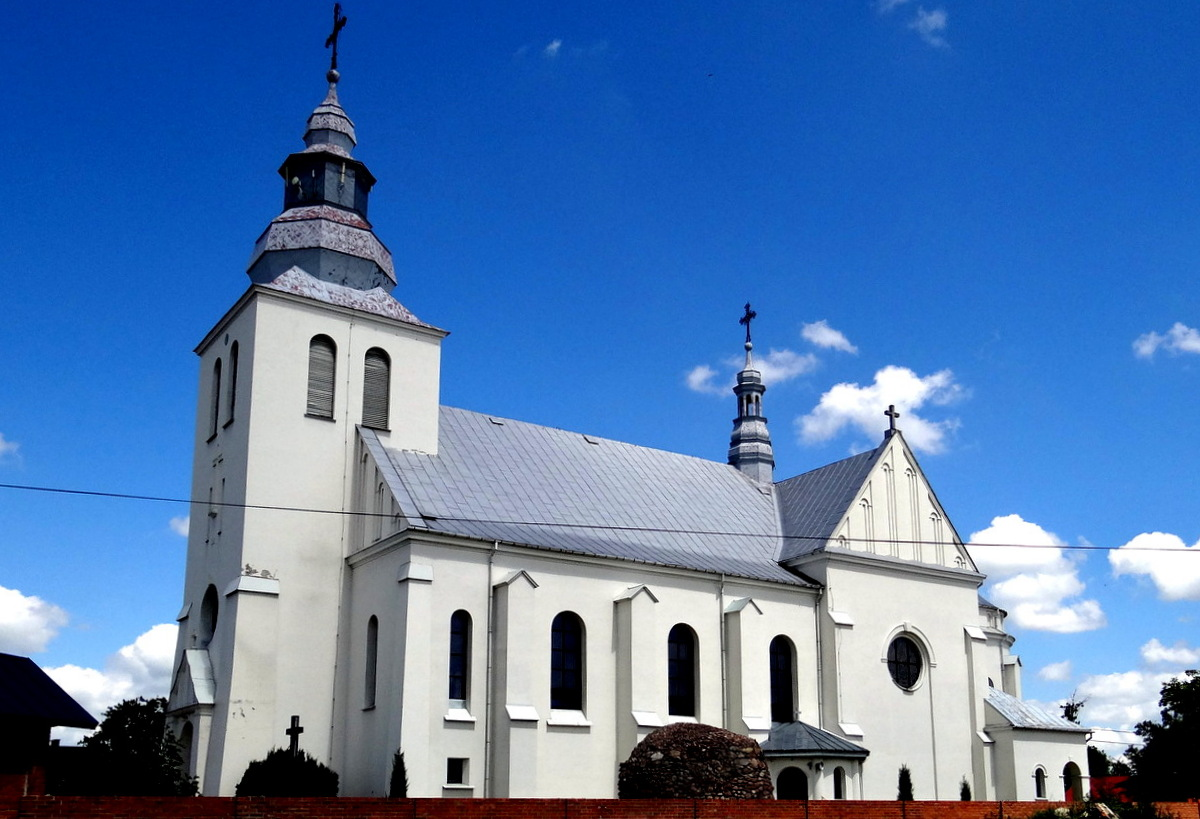
- Our Lady of Częstochowa church in Dzwola

- Location within Poland
- Coordinates: 50°42′N 22°34′E
- Country: Poland
- Voivodeship: Lublin
- County: Janów
- Gmina: Dzwola

Population
  - Total: 936
- Time zone: UTC+1 (CET)
  - Summer (DST): UTC+2 (CEST)
- Vehicle registration: LJA

Dzwola [ˈd͡zvɔla] is a village in Janów County, Lublin Voivodeship, in eastern Poland. It is the seat of the gmina (administrative district) called Gmina Dzwola.
