= Osówek, Bytów County =

Osówek
- Settlement
- Location within Poland
- Coordinates: 53°58′48″N 17°22′17″E
- Country: Poland
- Voivodeship: Pomeranian
- County: Bytów
- Gmina: Lipnica
- Population: 7

Osówek [ɔˈsuvɛk] is a settlement in the administrative district of Gmina Lipnica, within Bytów County, Pomeranian Voivodeship, in northern Poland.

For details of the history of the region, see History of Pomerania.
