= Godziszów, Lublin Voivodeship =

Godziszów
- Village
- Location within Poland
- Coordinates: 50°45′09″N 22°29′06″E
- Country: Poland
- Voivodeship: Lublin
- County: Janów
- Gmina: Godziszów
- Website: https://www.godziszow.pl

Godziszów [ɡɔˈd͡ʑiʂuf] is a village in Janów County, Lublin Voivodeship, in eastern Poland.
