= Gmina Chrzanów, Lublin Voivodeship =

Gmina Chrzanów Chrzanów Commune
- Gmina
- Interactive map of Gmina Chrzanów
- Coordinates (Chrzanów): 50°46′26″N 22°36′19″E
- Country: Poland
- Voivodeship: Lublin
- County: Janów
- Seat: Chrzanów

Area
  - Total: 70.03 km^{2} (27.04 sq mi)

Population (2013)
  - Total: 3,015
  - Density: 43.05/km^{2} (111.5/sq mi)
- Website: http://chrzanow.eurzad.eu/

Gmina Chrzanów is a rural gmina (administrative district) in Janów County, Lublin Voivodeship, in eastern Poland. Its seat is the village of Chrzanów, which lies approximately 15 kilometres (9 mi) north-east of Janów Lubelski and 53 km (33 mi) south of the regional capital Lublin.

The gmina covers an area of 70.03 square kilometres (27.0 sq mi), and as of 2006 its total population is 3,117 (3,015 in 2013).

== Villages ==
Gmina Chrzanów contains the villages and settlements of Chrzanów, Chrzanów-Kolonia, Łada, Malinie and Otrocz.

== Neighbouring gminas ==
Gmina Chrzanów is bordered by the gminas of Dzwola, Godziszów, Goraj, Turobin and Zakrzew.
