= Janów County =

Janów County Powiat janowski
- County
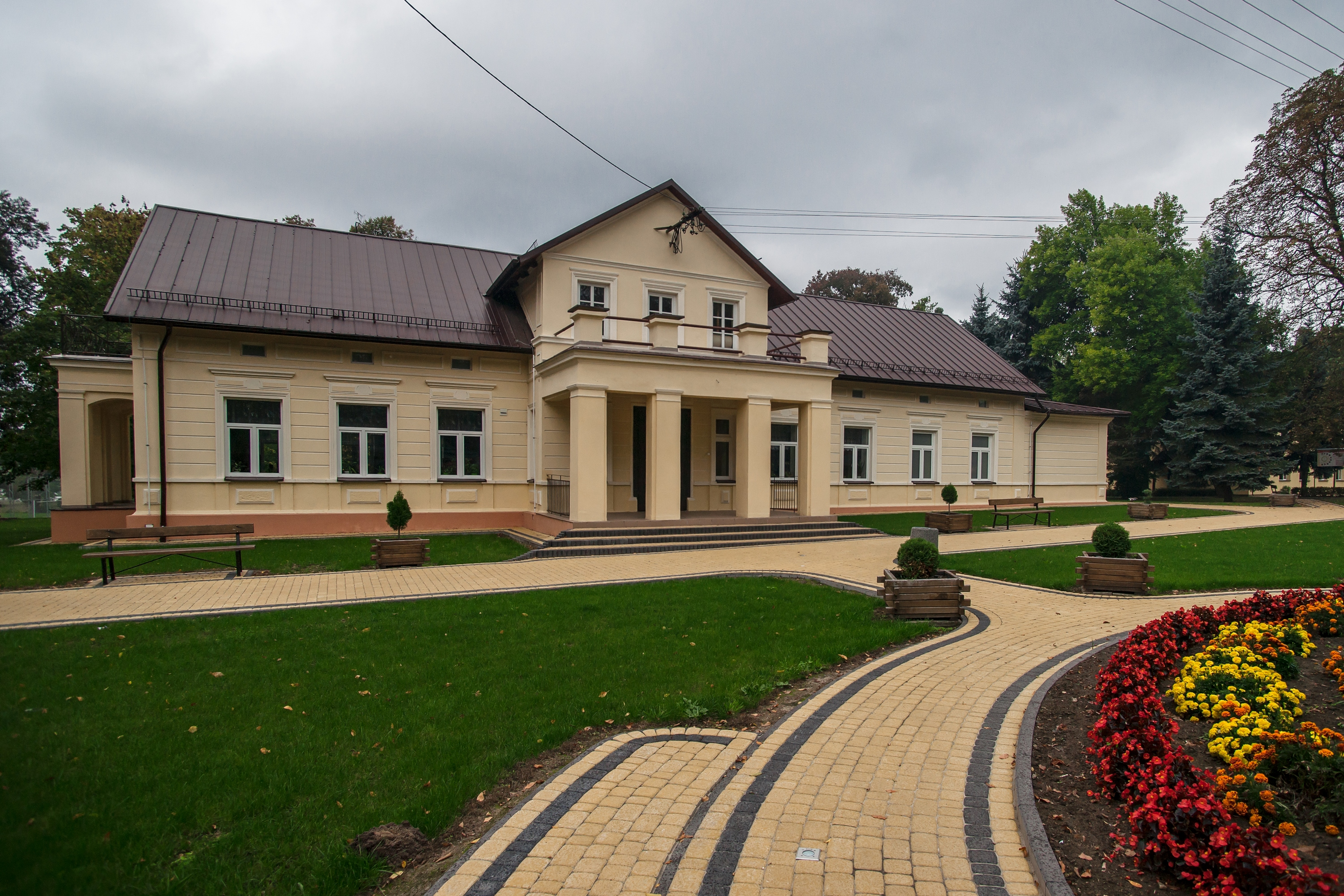
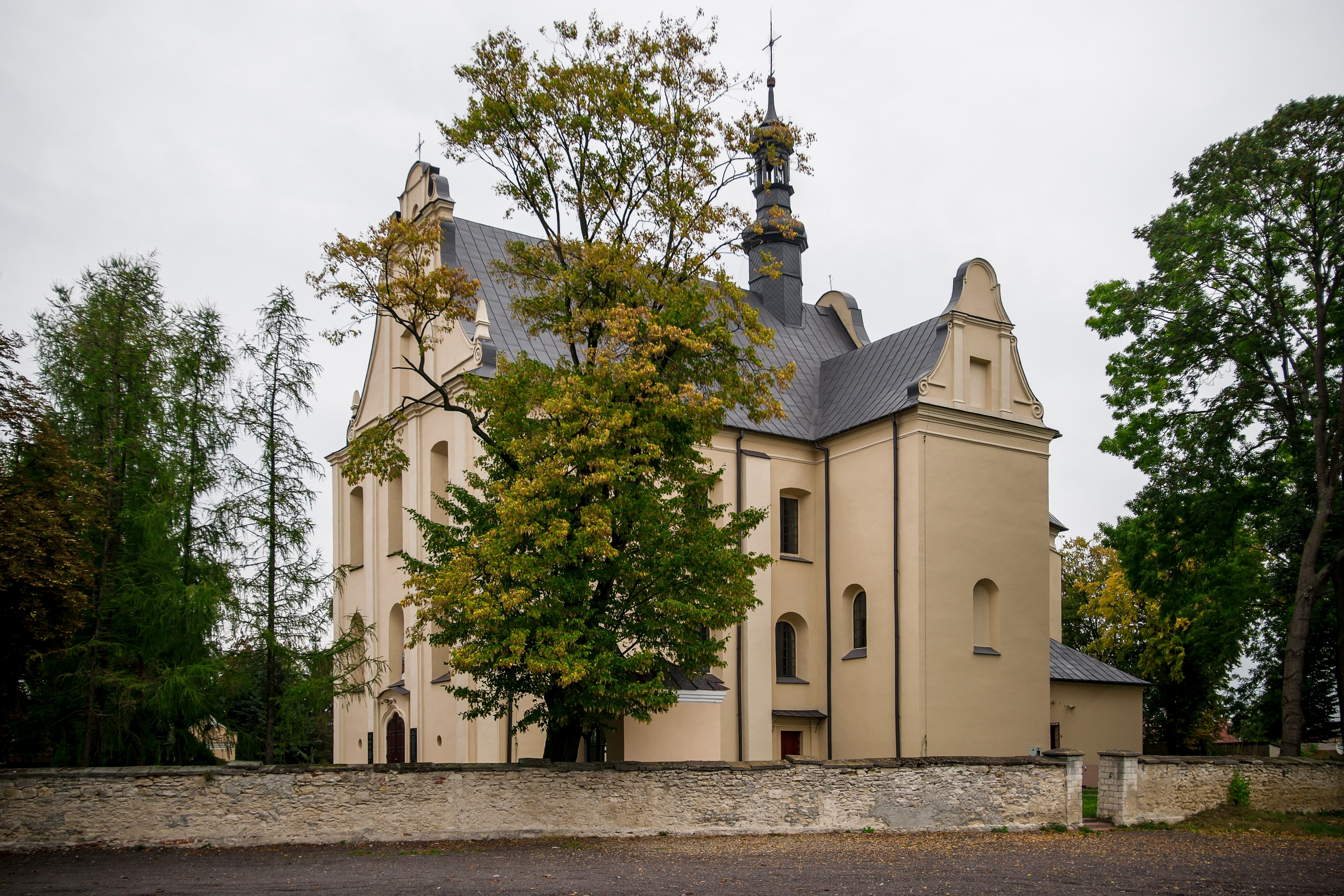
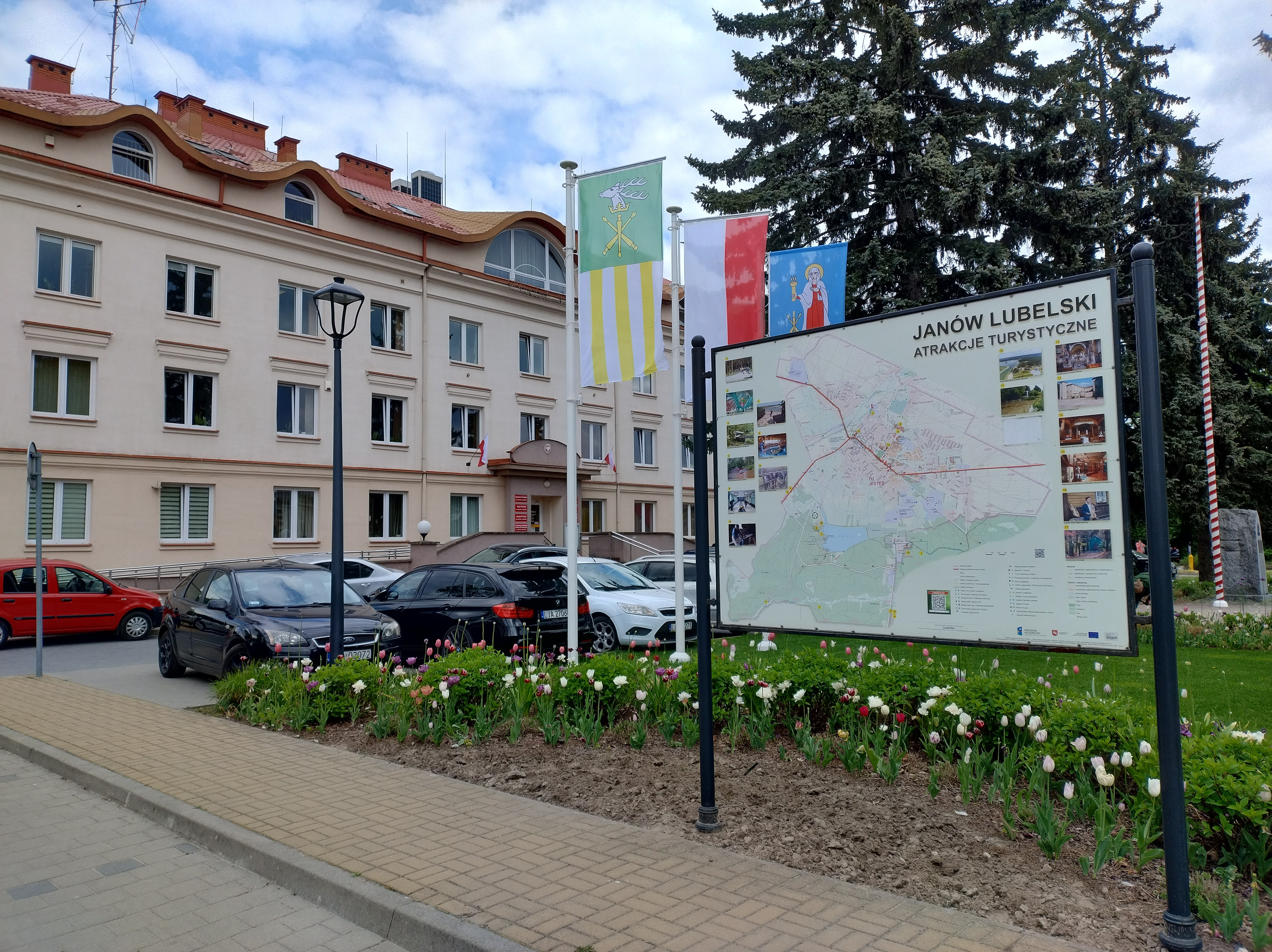
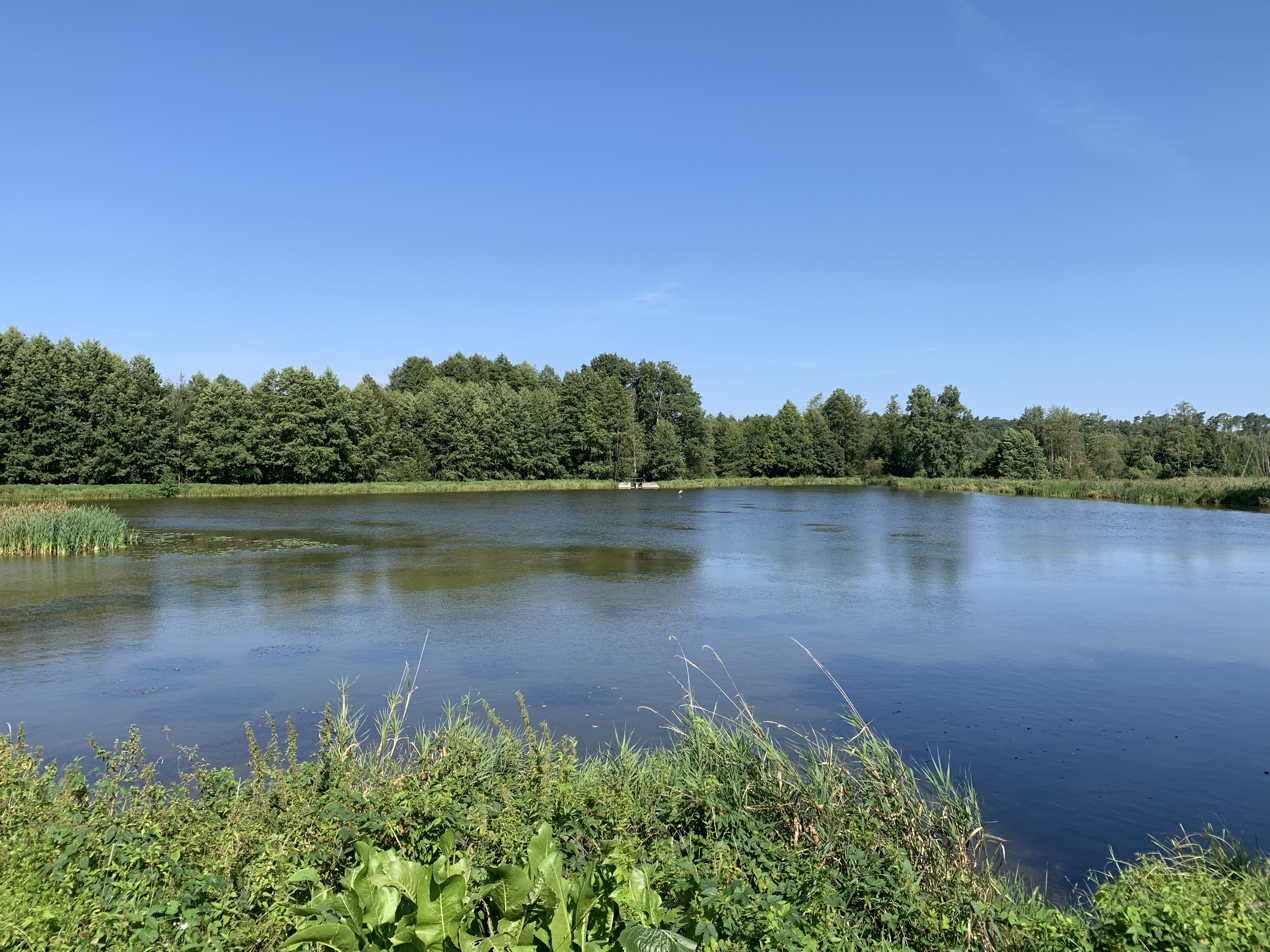
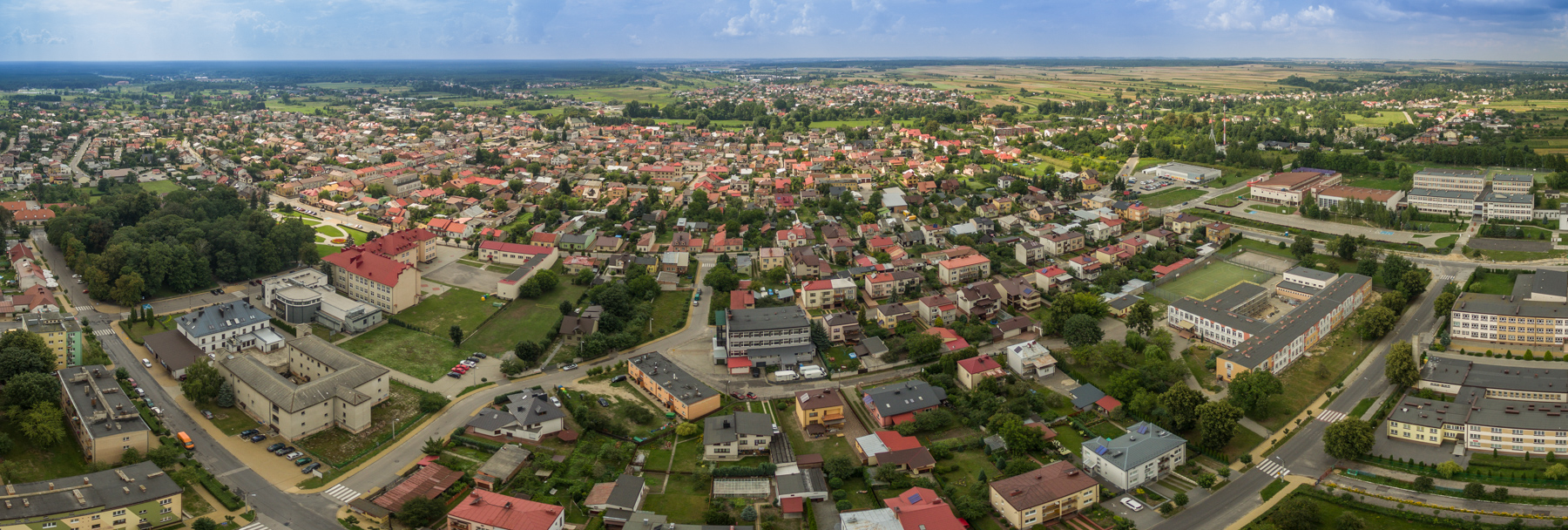
- Przanowski Manor in Potoczek Saint Stanislaus church in Modliborzyce County Office in Janów Lubelski Minina River in Dąbrówka Aerial view of Janów Lubelski

- Flag Coat of arms

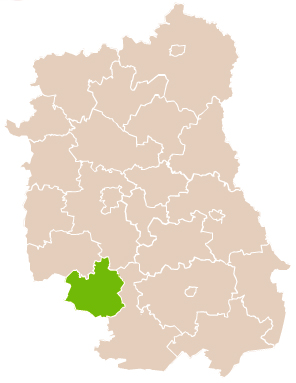
- Location within the voivodeship
- Coordinates (Janów Lubelski): 50°43′N 22°25′E
- Country: Poland
- Voivodeship: Lublin
- Seat: Janów Lubelski
- Gminas: Total 7: Gmina Batorz; Gmina Chrzanów; Gmina Dzwola; Gmina Godziszów; Gmina Janów Lubelski; Gmina Modliborzyce; Gmina Potok Wielki

Area
  - Total: 875.34 km^{2} (337.97 sq mi)

Population (2019)
  - Total: 44,383
  - Density: 50.704/km^{2} (131.32/sq mi)
  - Urban: 11,901
  - Rural: 32,482
- Time zone: UTC+1 (CET)
  - Summer (DST): UTC+2 (CEST)
- Car plates: LJA
- Website: www.bip.powiatjanowski.pl

Janów County (Polish: powiat janowski) is a unit of territorial administration and local government (powiat) in Lublin Voivodeship, eastern Poland. It was established on January 1, 1999, as a result of the Polish local government reforms passed in 1998. Its administrative seat is Janów Lubelski, and the two towns are Janów Lubelski and Modliborzyce, which lies 60 kilometres (37 mi) south of the regional capital Lublin.

The county covers an area of 875.34 square kilometres (338.0 sq mi). As of 2019, its total population is 44,383, out of which the population of Janów Lubelski is 11,901 and the rural population is 32,482.

== Neighbouring counties ==
Janów County is bordered by Kraśnik County and Lublin County to the north, Biłgoraj County to the south-east, Nisko County to the south-west, and Stalowa Wola County to the west.

== Administrative divisions ==
The county is subdivided into seven gminas (two urban-rural and five rural). These are listed in the following table, in descending order of population.

Gmina	Type	Area (km^{2})	Population (2019)	Seat
Gmina Janów Lubelski	urban-rural	178.2	15,916	Janów Lubelski
Gmina Dzwola	rural	203.1	6,271	Dzwola
Gmina Godziszów	rural	101.7	5,811	Godziszów
Gmina Modliborzyce	urban-rural	153.2	5,509	Modliborzyce
Gmina Potok Wielki	rural	98.3	4,655	Potok Wielki
Gmina Batorz	rural	70.8	3,288	Batorz
Gmina Chrzanów	rural	70.0	2,933	Chrzanów
