= Roman Tokarczyk =

Polish legal scholar (born 1942)

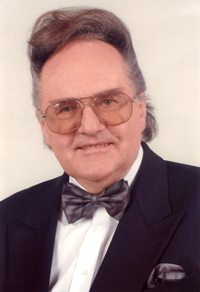
- Born: March 16, 1942 (age 84)
- Occupation: Law professor
- Spouse: Czesława

Academic background
- Education: Maria Curie-Sklodowska University

Academic work
- Discipline: Comparative law, international law, legal history, philosophy of law, law and religion
- Institutions: Maria Curie-Sklodowska University
- Website: www.romantokarczyk.eu

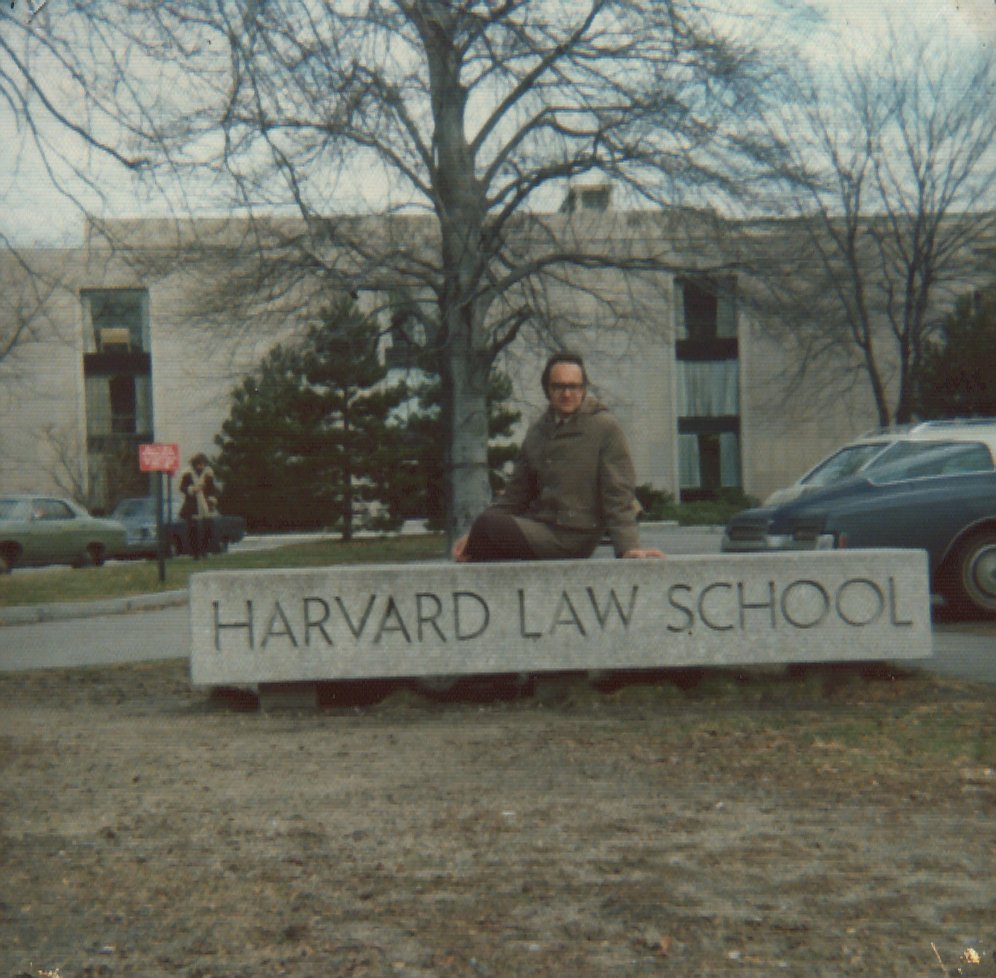
Roman Tokarczyk in front of the Harvard Law School, 1974

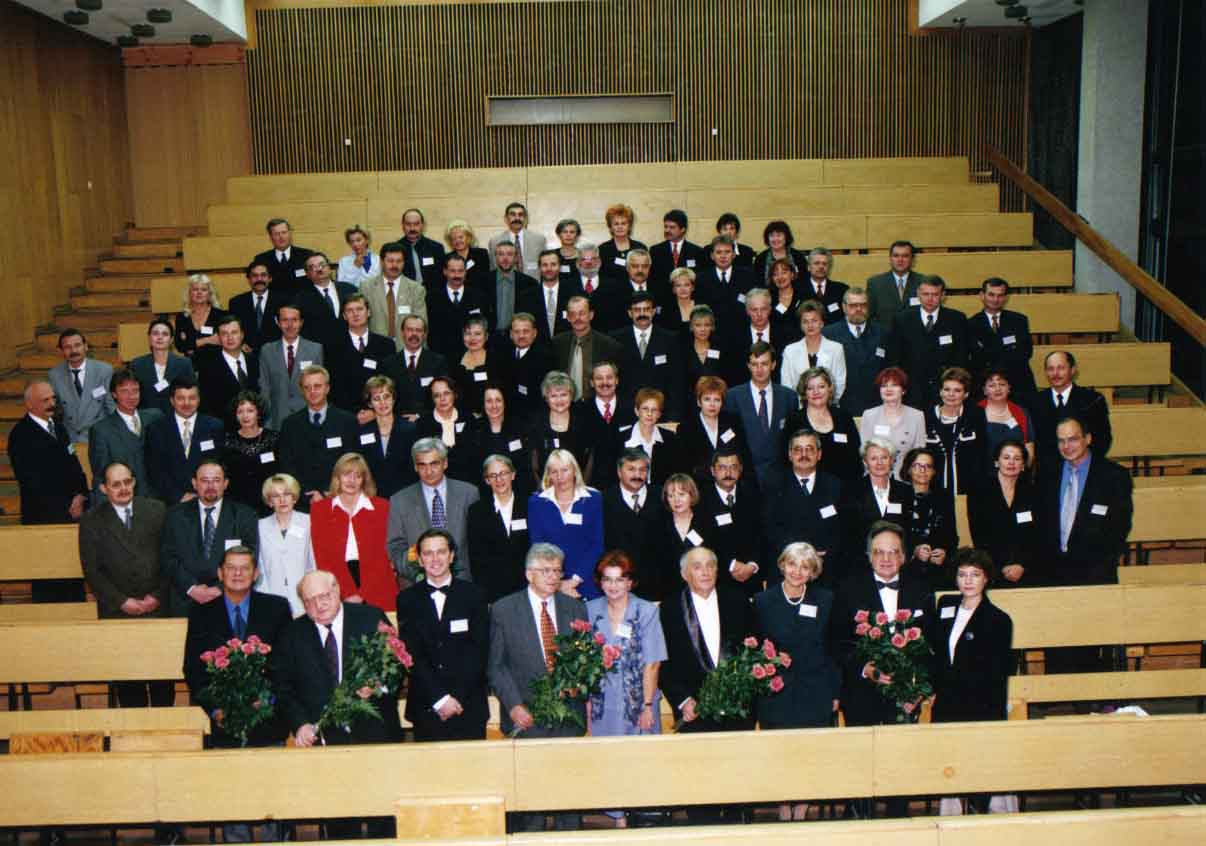
Roman Tokarczyk among professors and graduates of the UMCS Faculty of Law and Administration in Lublin (second from the right, front row)

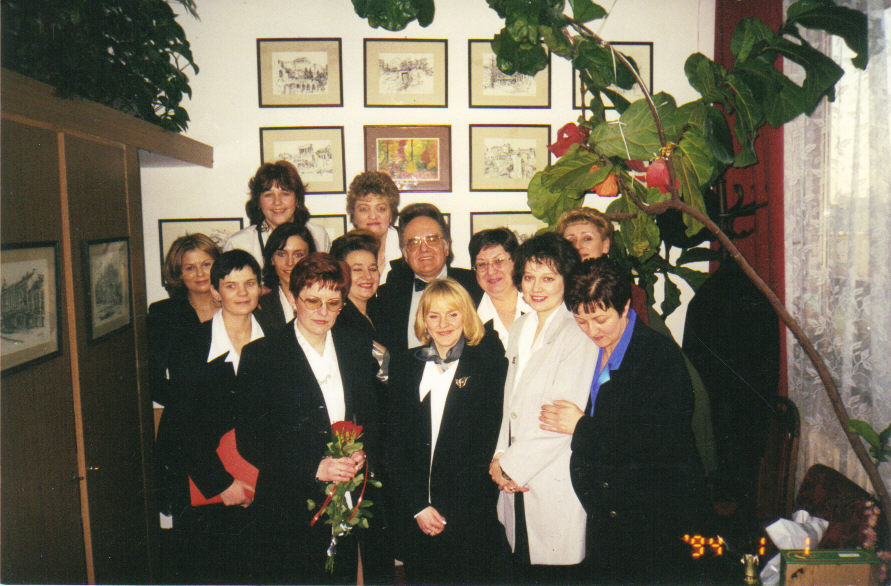
Roman Tokarczyk with graduates of the UMCS Faculty of Law and Administration in Lublin

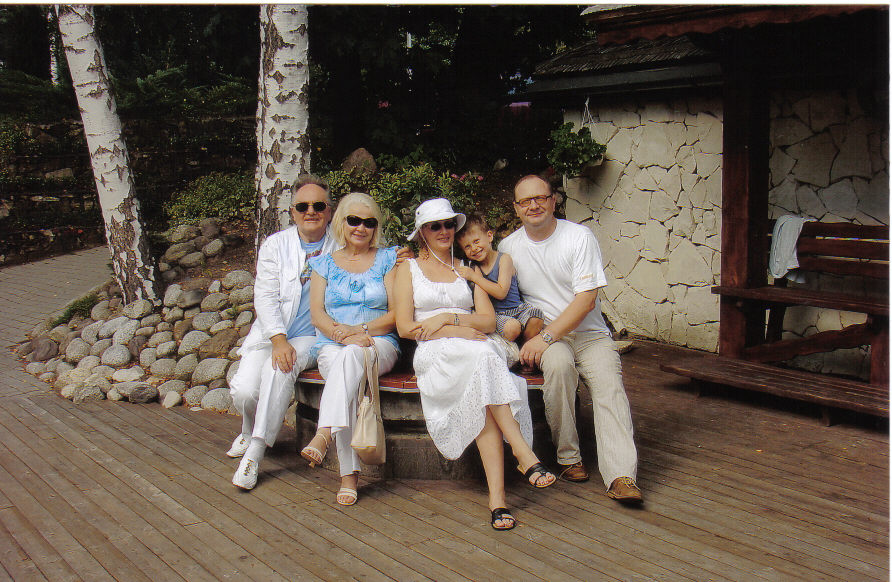
Roman Tokarczyk with his family

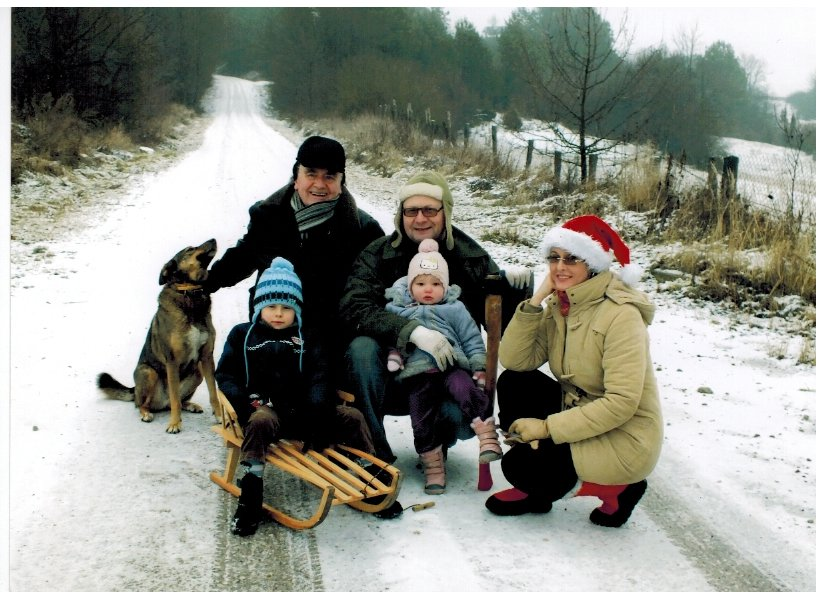
Roman Tokarczyk with his family

Roman Andrzej Tokarczyk (born March 1942) is a legal scholar and philosopher, full professor, lecturing at the Faculty of Law and Administration, Maria Curie-Sklodowska University (UMCS) in Lublin, Poland, and at the Faculty of Management and Administration of the Zamość University of Management and Administration. He specializes in ethics, history of political law doctrines, comparative legal studies, philosophy of law and in American law. He has authored popular books in these fields and translated works of Hobbes and Fuller.

== Career ==
Tokarczyk was born Gródki, Poland. In 1961, Tokarczyk finished Pedagogical High School in Biłgoraj; in 1966 he graduated with MA degrees in law and philosophy from UMCS. He served as councilor of the Municipal People's Council in Lublin in 1969–1973. Awarded a PhD degree in 1970, he received a postdoctoral degree (Habilitation) in 1976. He was appointed professor extraordinary in 1990 and full professor in 1994.

Since 1979, he has been Head of the Department of Theory of Organization and Management, Faculty of Law and Administration. From 1996 to 2000 he was Dean of the Faculty of Law and Economics, of the Studii Generalis Sandomiriensis College of Humanities and Natural Sciences in Sandomierz. From 1993 to 1997 he served as member of the Trybunału Stanu. He was professor at the University of Rzeszów and Radom Academy of Economics in Radom.

He spent research stays as a Fulbright fellow inter alia at the International Research and Exchange Board in New York City, at the University of Notre Dame, Harvard, University of California, Berkeley, UCLA and under the NATO Foundation in Paris, Rome, Vienna, and Copenhagen.

He has supervised 2,311 bachelor's and master's degree theses and reviewed 3,212 of them. He has supervised nine doctoral dissertations (PhDs awarded) and seven pending doctoral procedures, and also reviewed 18 doctoral dissertations and eleven Habilitationsschrifts (postdoctoral dissertations). He has prepared opinions for several procedures of conferment of professorial titles and has reviewed the motion for the conferral procedure of the honorary doctoral degree.

He is a member of many scholarly organizations, including Polska Akademia Medycyny (the Polish Medical Academy), Polish Academy of Sciences (PAN) Committees, the New York Academy of Sciences, and the executive committee of the International Communal Studies Association.

Tokarczyk introduced the term 'biojurisprudence' as a branch of the science of law which deals with the regulations of threats to human life from the moment of conception to death. He also introduced the following terms: 'biolaw' (legal regulations of problems concerning the subject of biojurisprudence), 'biojusgenesis' (religious, moral and legal problems concerning the normative protection of the conceived human being and human fetus), 'biojustherapy' (religious, moral and legal problems of the normative protection of human life from birth to death), and 'biojusthanatology' (normative problems concerning human death – religious, moral and legal).

== Awards ==
Decorations include Bronze, Silver and Gold Crosses of Merit, the Bronze Medal of merit for Defense of the Country, an Honorary Badge for Merit for the Lublin Region, and Badge for Merit for the Zamość Province, along with many other medals, diplomas and awards.

== Books ==
- Współczesne doktryny polityczne (1971) Contemporary Political Doctrines
- 25 Lat Wydziału Prawa i Administracji Uniwersytetu Marii Curie-Skłodowskiej (1975) 25 Years of the Faculty of Law and Administration of Maria Curie-Sklodowska University
- Winstanley (1975)
- Prawa wierne naturze. Krytyka doktryny Lona Luvois Fullera (1976) Laws True to Nature. A Critique of Lon Luvois Fuller's Doctrine
- Doktryna Prawa Natury Lona Luvois Fullera (1976) Lon Luvois Fullers Doctrine of Natural Law
- Utopia Nowej Lewicy Amerykańskiej (1979) Utopia of the American New Left
- Współczesna amerykańska myśl polityczna (1981) Contemporary American Political Thought
- Szkice z Myśli Politycznej Marksizmu (1981) Sketches on the Political Thought of Marxism
- Tradycja i postęp w prawie (red.) (1983) Tradition and Progress in Law (ed.)
- Prawa narodzin, życia i śmierci (1984) The Law of Birth, Life and Death
- Hobbes. Zarys żywota i myśli (1987) Hobbes. An Outline of Life and Thought
- Historia filozofii prawa (1988) History of Philosophy of Law
- Klasycy praw natury (1988) Natural Law Classics
- Komparatystyka prawnicza (1989) Comparative Law
- Gródki. Dzieje wsi roztoczańskiej (1992) Gródki. A Roztocze Village's History
- Filozofia prawa (1993) Philosophy of Law
- Rozważania o sprawiedliwości (1993) Considerations about Justice
- Polska myśl utopijna (1995) Polish Utopian Thought
- Prawo amerykańskie (1996) American Law
- Biojurysprudencja. Nowy nurt jurysprudencji (1997) Biojurisprudence. A New Current in Jurisprudence
- Współczesne kultury prawne (2000). Contemporary Legal Cultures
- Ze sztandarem prawa przez świat (2002) With the Banner of Law across the World (co-edited by Krzysztof Motyka)
- Turobin. Dzieje miejscowości (2002) Turobin. A History of the Town
- Przykazania etyki prawniczej. Księga myśli, norm i rycin (2003) Commandments of Legal Ethics. A Book of Thoughts, Norms and Sketches
- Etyka Prawnicza (2005) [Legal Ethics]
- Antologia Anegdoty Akademickiej (2006) The Anthology of Academic Anecdotes
- Biojurysprudencja. Podstawy prawa dla XXI wieku (2008) (in English below)
- Biojurisprudence. Foundations of Law for The Twenty-First Century (2008)
- Nowa Lewica (2010) (The New Left)
- Medycyna a Normy (2011) (Medicine and Norms)
- Liceum Pedagogiczne w Biłgoraju (2011) (Pedagogical High School in Biłgoraj)

== Bibliography ==
- Juha - Pekka Rentto, Bioiurisprudence? A Comment to Professor Tokarczyk, Recent Developments and State Practice, Helsinki, 1999.
- Jan Klabbers, Bioiurisprudence?, "Religion and Human Rights. An International Jurnal, Helsinki, no. 20, 1999.
- Wagner Wenceslas J., Comment On Prof. Tokarczyk’s Article „The Subject Matter of Bioiurisprudence and Biolaw”, Dialoque and Universalism 2000, vol. X, No. 7-8.
- Aleksander Mereżko, Biojurysprudencja - nowij napriom w suczastii naući prawa, "Juridićieskij Żurnał" 2008, nr 1.
- Jerzy Jaskiernia, Biojurysprudencja - nowe oblicze prawa. "Państwo i Prawo" 2008, z. 11.
- Jan Filip, Biojurisprudence - nový pohled na právo nebo jen nový směr právní vědy?, Časopis pro právní vědu a praxi, Roč. 17, č. 2(2009), s. 71–76
- Mateusz Godawa, Biojurisprudence as an Original Concept of Knowledge and Information on the Law, Proceedings of the 8th International Conference on Human Rights. The Rights to Knowledge and Information in a Heterogenic Society. Edited by: Bronisław Sitek, Jakub J. Szczerbowski, Aleksander W. Bauknecht and Anna Kaczyńska, Cambridge Scholars Publishing 2009, s. 350 - 372
- Oktawian Nawrot, Jerzy Zajadło, Biojurysprudencja - dom zbudowany na piasku czy na skale?, Diametros 2009, nr 22 s. 172 - 177
- Jerzy Stelmach, Bartosz Brożek, Marta Soniewicka, Wojciech Załuski Paradoksy bioetyki prawniczej, Warszawa 2010
- Anetta Breczko, Podmiotowość prawna człowieka w warunkach postępu biotechnomedycznego, Białystok 2011, s. 39, 414.
- Słownik Bioetyki, Biopolityki i Ekofilozofii, Redakcja naukowa Mariusz Ciszek, Polskie Towarzystwo Filozoficzne, Warszawa 2008 S. 32 - 33
- Biojurysprudencja. Podstawy prawa dla XXI wieku. Roman Tokarczyk. Wydawnictwo Uniwersytetu Marii Curie - Skłodowskiej, Lublin, 2008
