= Czernięcin =

Czernięcin may refer to the following places in Poland:

- Czernięcin Główny
- Czernięcin Poduchowny
