= Gmina Turobin =

Gmina Turobin Turobin Commune
- Gmina
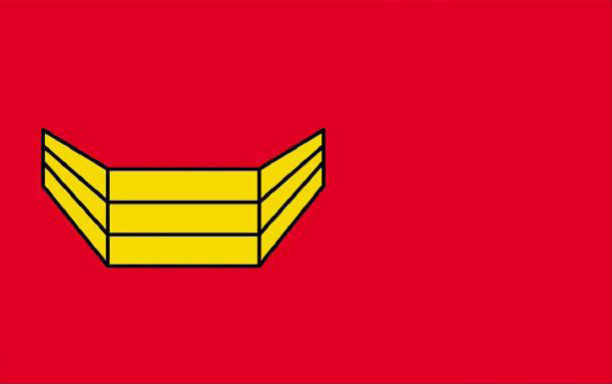
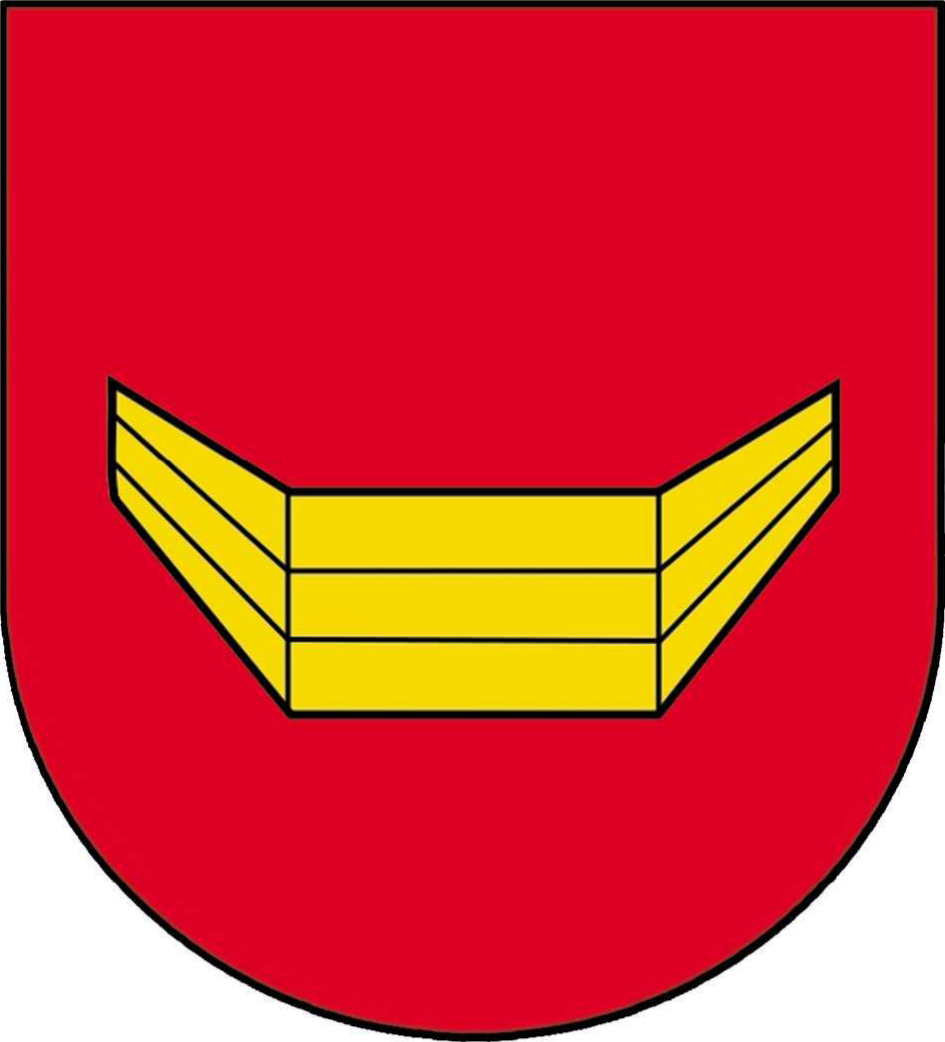
- Flag Coat of arms
- Interactive map of Gmina Turobin
- Coordinates (Turobin): 50°49′30″N 22°44′40″E
- Country: Poland
- Voivodeship: Lublin
- County: Biłgoraj
- Seat: Turobin

Area
  - Total: 162.19 km^{2} (62.62 sq mi)

Population (2006)
  - Total: 6,949
  - Density: 42.84/km^{2} (111.0/sq mi)
- Website: http://www.turobin.gmina.woi.lublin.pl

Gmina Turobin is a rural gmina (administrative district) in Biłgoraj County, Lublin Voivodeship, in eastern Poland. Its seat is the village of Turobin, which lies approximately 31 kilometres (19 mi) north of Biłgoraj and 49 km (30 mi) south of the regional capital Lublin.

The gmina covers an area of 162.19 square kilometres (62.6 sq mi), and as of 2006 its total population is 6,949.

== Villages ==
Gmina Turobin contains the villages and settlements of Czernięcin Główny, Czernięcin Poduchowny, Elizówka, Gaj Czernięciński, Gródki, Guzówka-Kolonia, Huta Turobińska, Nowa Wieś, Olszanka, Polesiska, Przedmieście Szczebrzeszyńskie, Rokitów, Tarnawa Duża, Tarnawa Mała, Tarnawa-Kolonia, Tokary, Turobin, Wólka Czernięcińska, Zabłocie, Żabno, Żabno-Kolonia, Zagroble, Załawcze, and Żurawie.

== Neighbouring gminas ==
Gmina Turobin is bordered by the gminas of Chrzanów, Goraj, Radecznica, Rudnik, Sułów, Wysokie, Zakrzew, and Żółkiewka.
