= Szymon Szymonowic =

Polish writer (1558–1629)

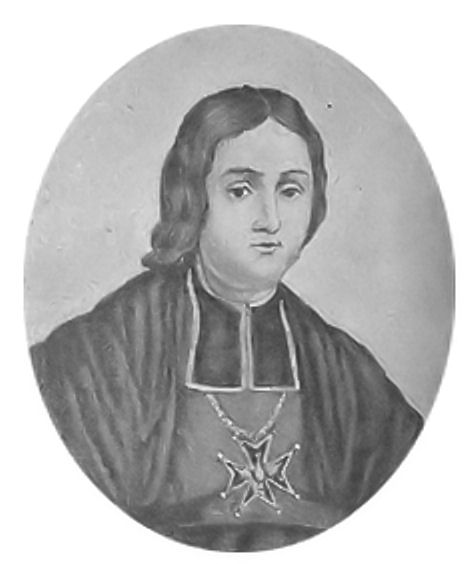
Szymon Szymonowic

Szymon Szymonowic (in Latin, Simon Simonides; in Armenian, Շիմոն Շիմոնովիչ; also, in Polish, "Szymonowicz" and "Bendoński"; Lwów, 24 October 1558 – 5 May 1629, Czarnięcin, near Zamość) was a Polish Renaissance poet. He was known as "the Polish Pindar."

== Life ==
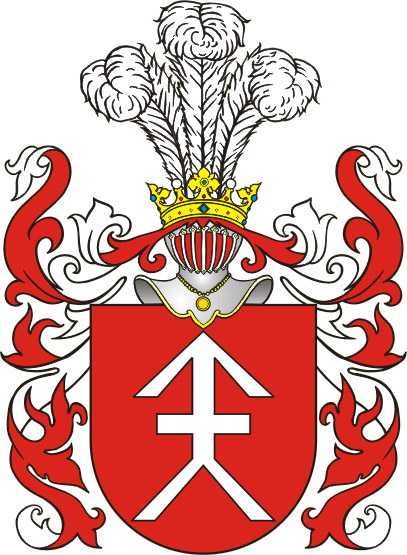
Kościesza coat-of-arms

Szymonowic studied in Poland (Lwów, Kraków), France and Belgium. From 1586 he was associated with Grand Hetman and Royal Chancellor Jan Zamoyski, with whom in 1593–1605 he organized the Zamojski Academy.

In 1590 he was elevated to the nobility (szlachta), with Kościesza coat-of-arms.

A humanist fluent in Greek and Latin, Szymonowic wrote in Polish Sielanki (Pastorals, 1614), a work influenced by the pastoral poems of Virgil and Theocritus. He also wrote plays in Latin, e.g., Castus Joseph (1587) and Pentesilea (1614). Szymonowic is considered the last great poet of the Polish Renaissance.

He was acquainted with the Scottish Latinist Thomas Seget of Seton (1569 or 1570–1627).

== See also ==
- List of Poles
- Polish poetry
- List of Polish-language poets
