= Zagroble =

Zagroble may refer to the following places:

- Zagroble, Biłgoraj County in Lublin Voivodeship (east Poland)
- Zagroble, Hrubieszów County in Lublin Voivodeship (east Poland)
- Zagroble, Subcarpathian Voivodeship (south-east Poland)
