= Zabłocie, Biłgoraj County =

Zabłocie
- Village
- Location within Poland
- Coordinates: 50°48′50″N 22°52′40″E
- Country: Poland
- Voivodeship: Lublin
- County: Biłgoraj
- Gmina: Turobin

Population
  - Total: 71

Zabłocie [zaˈbwɔt͡ɕɛ] is a village in the administrative district of Gmina Turobin, within Biłgoraj County, Lublin Voivodeship, in eastern Poland.
