= Yitzchak Huberman =

Personal life
- Born: May 18, 1896
- Died: January 3, 1977 (aged 80)
- Buried: Har Hamenuchot, Jerusalem

Religious life
- Religion: Judaism

Rabbi Yitzchak HaCohen Huberman (6 Sivan 5656, May 18, 1896 – 13 Tevet 5737, January 3, 1977) was a Hasidic kabbalist who served as head of the rabbinical court (av beit din) and rabbi of the Wetzlar displaced persons camp. He became known as "the Tzaddik of Ra'anana."

== Early life ==
Huberman was born in Bilgoraj to Zlata Esther and Rabbi Asher Anshil Huberman. As a child, he was a diligent student, and by the age of 10 he began studying with the town's rabbi, Yaakov Mordechai Zilberman, who was a disciple of Rabbi Yaakov Aryeh of Trisk. In 1911, he left home to study at the yeshiva of Rabbi Shmuel Bornstein. When World War I began, Huberman moved to Warsaw where he spent time in the Hasidic court of Ger under Avraham Mordechai Alter. He studied there with Rabbi Menachem Shachna Ryczywół, author of Responsa Shem Olam. He later studied under Rabbi Tzvi Hirsch Glickson, son-in-law of Rabbi Chaim Soloveitchik. In 1927, Huberman wrote a commentary on the Torah and Talmud.

== Holocaust years ==
Huberman was in Warsaw at the outbreak of World War II. After several months under Nazi occupation, he moved to Ternogród, in the Soviet occupation zone. Eventually, he was deported to Siberia. While there, to avoid having to work on Shabbat, he used an axe to sever one of his a fingertips. After the Holocaust, he ended up in Wetzlar displaced persons' camp in Germany, where he served in the rabbinate for six years. During his tenure, he worked to strengthen religious observance in the city and, and wrote halachic responsa permitting Holocaust surviving agunot to remarry.

== In Israel ==
In 1950, he moved to Israel and settled in Ra'anana.As his reputation as a kabbalist and miracle worker, many people came to receive a blessing from him. He would pray strenuously for people and would sometimes weep for hours for the recovery of a sick person. He slept only a few hours a night, and diligently studied both the revealed and hidden, Kabbalistic, Torah. He would interpret world events with his Kabbalistic insights.

He wrote books on all areas of Torah: Bible, Talmud, halakhic responsa, Midrash, and Kabbalah. He published two volumes of his work, Ben Le'oshri - Berakha Meshulleshet. The book was named Meshuleshet (threefold) because he wrote it while living in three places: Poland, Siberia, and Israel. The book includes approbations from rabbis who had died many years previously. A third volume was published posthumously.

He was close to the Ger Hasidic dynasty and was an admirer of the Rebbe, who referred to Huberman as "the Rabbi of Ra'anana" and would secretly come to observe him.

He died in 1977 and was buried on Har HaMenuchot. He had no children. Yeshivat Birkat Yitzchak in Ra'anana is named after him.

== Published works ==
- Ben Le'ashrei Berakha Meshulleshet. Novellae and commentaries on the Torah, 3 volumes. The introduction to the book includes his biography. Republished in 2001.
- Ben Le'ashrei She'elot U-Teshuvot (Responsa). Contains hundreds of halakhic correspondences between Rabbi Huberman and other rabbis, including Rabbi Shlomo David Kahana, Rabbi Naftali Henig (author of the responsa Tiferet Naftali), and others.
