= Black Red White =

Polish furniture manufacturer

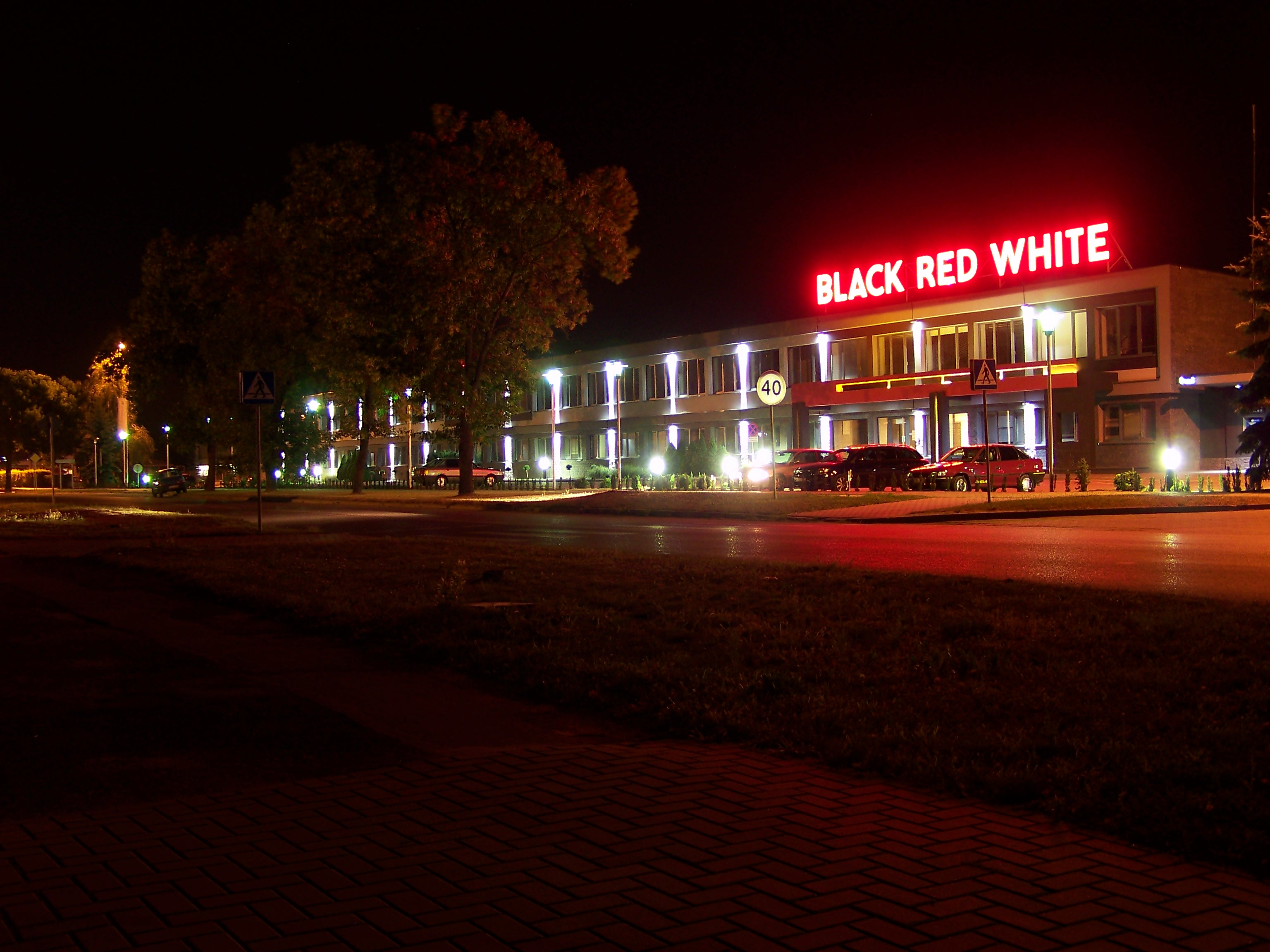
- Founded: 1991
- Founder: Tadeusz Chmiel
- Headquarters: Biłgoraj, Poland
- Products: Furniture
- Revenue: 1.630.434.000 zł (2012)
- Number of employees: 7,883 (2012)

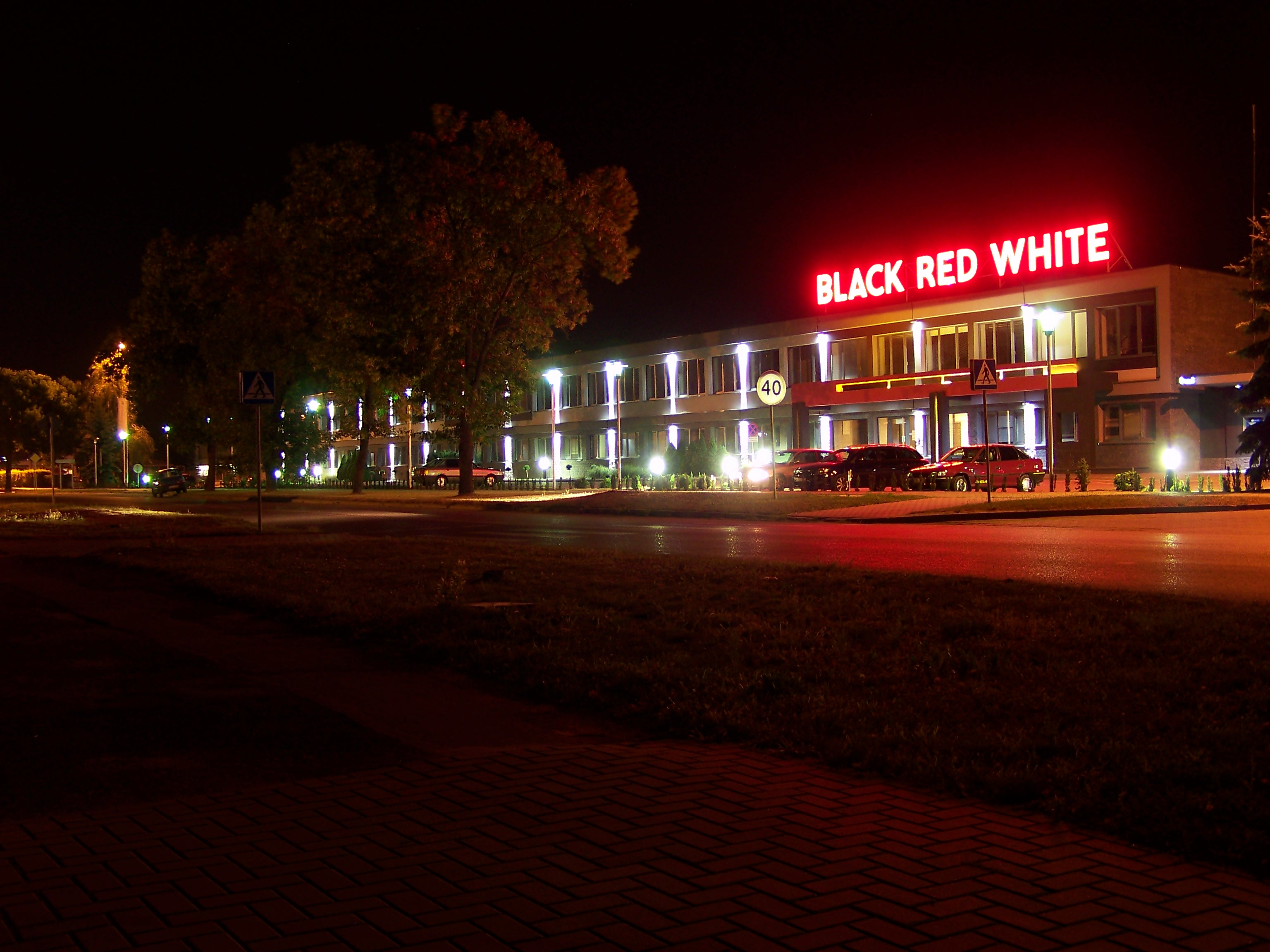
Headquarter in Biłgoraj, Krzeszowska Street

Black Red White is a leading furniture manufacturer in Poland, founded in Chmielek, Poland in 1991. The company's headquarters is located in Biłgoraj. Black Red White S.A. is the biggest Polish manufacturer of traditional and new furniture systems, home and office furniture and upholstered fittings made of furniture panels, MDF and solid wood. BRW S.A. is an organization consisting of 17 production plants which employ over 6,000 people.

Total production volume exceeding 180,000,000 sq ft of furniture panels a year, wholesale of over 7,000,000 cabinets annually and over 800 furniture models place BRW S.A. in the top ten plants of this kind in the world. The large-scale production lowers costs and allows them to offer very low prices.

The company has branches in Poland, Slovakia, Ukraine and overseas (United States and Canada).

It is owned by Polish millionaire Tadeusz Chmiel.
