= Gaj Czernięciński =

- Village
- Location within Poland
- Coordinates: 50°47′N 22°49′E
- Country: Poland
- Voivodeship: Lublin
- County: Biłgoraj
- Gmina: Turobin

Population
  - Total: 97

Gaj Czernięciński (Polish pronunciation: [ˈɡaj tʂɛrɲɛɲˈtɕij̃skʲi]) is a village in the administrative district of Gmina Turobin, within Biłgoraj County, Lublin Voivodeship, in eastern Poland.
