= Biłgoraj pierogi =

Polish food dish

Biłgoraj pieróg
- Alternative names: Pierogi biłgorajskie
- Type: Savoury pie or pâté
- Course: Main
- Place of origin: Biłgoraj, Poland
- Serving temperature: Hot or cold
- Main ingredients: Potatoes, quark, buckwheat groats (kasha)

Biłgoraj pieróg (Polish: pieróg biłgorajski, piróg biłgorajski, krupniak) is a traditional Polish regional dish, originating from Biłgoraj Land, formerly prepared for important celebrations and holidays.

Pieróg biłgorajski is baked either without a crust, in which case it is called "łysy" ("bald"), or with a yeast dough crust. The filling is based on cooked potatoes, quark and cooked buckwheat groats (kasha). The other ingredients are eggs, śmietana (sour cream), fatback or lard, mint (fresh or dried) and spices (salt, black pepper). The kneaded dough is formed into a rectangular or circular shape and baked in the oven. Optionally, pieróg biłgorajski can be folded in a thin layer of yeast-based dough.

The texture of the pieróg (singular) is solid, easy to break or crumble, with its appearance resembling that of freshly cooked pâté. It may be served hot or cold, with śmietana, milk or butter.

A Polish dish with a similar taste is kaszak, which is de facto a bread roll filled with Biłgoraj pieróg.

Since October 4, 2005, Biłgoraj pierogi are found on the Polish Ministry of Agriculture and Rural Development's List of Traditional Products.

== See also ==
- Polish cuisine
- Lubelszczyzna cuisine
