= Thomas Seget =

Scottish poet (1569–1627)

Thomas Seget (Seton?, 1569 – Amsterdam, 1627) was a Scottish poet who wrote in Latin.

== Biography ==
Seget is first recorded as a convert from Calvinism to Catholicism, attending the Scots College at Louvain in 1596, but did not stay long. Carrying a letter of recommendation from Justus Lipsius, the Flemish humanist, he travelled to Italy where he met Galileo in 1599. He travelled further through Europe, making the acquaintances among others of Kepler in Prague. He also corresponded with the Polish poet Szymon Szymonowic, and other Polish connections included his stay at the University of Altdorf 1614–1616 at the same time as the Socinian activity there around Samuel Przypkowski.

His album amicorum, held at the Vatican Library, contains inscriptions by several distinguished literary men and scientists: among them, Justus Lipsius, Abraham Ortelius, Gian Vincenzo Pinelli, Erycius Puteanus, Nicolas-Claude Fabri de Peiresc, Paolo Sarpi and, most notably, Galileo.

== Works ==
- Poems (posthumous) in Delitiae poetarum scotorum huius aevi illustrium. Amsterdam 1637
- Friendship album – Thomae Segeti Scoti Collectio plurium erga ipsum amicitiae monumentorum a Viris illustribus scripta. (Vatican Library); Stefano Gattei, "The Wandering Scot: Thomas Seget's album amicorum", Nuncius, 28, 2013, pp. 345–363 (a full transcription of Seget's album amicorum and related material, and a full biography of Seget).
- Appeal to King James for permission to return to Scotland.
