= Polesiska =

- Village
- Location within Poland
- Coordinates: 50°52′43″N 22°44′55″E
- Country: Poland
- Voivodeship: Lublin
- County: Biłgoraj
- Gmina: Turobin

Polesiska [pɔlɛˈɕiska] is a village in the administrative district of Gmina Turobin, within Biłgoraj County, Lublin Voivodeship, in eastern Poland.
