= Huta Turobińska =

- Village
- Location within Poland
- Coordinates: 50°47′20″N 22°40′10″E
- Country: Poland
- Voivodeship: Lublin
- County: Biłgoraj
- Gmina: Turobin

Population
  - Total: 281

Huta Turobińska [ˈxuta turɔˈbiɲska] is a village in the administrative district of Gmina Turobin, within Biłgoraj County, Lublin Voivodeship, in eastern Poland.
