= Żurawie, Lublin Voivodeship =

Żurawie
- Village
- Location within Poland
- Coordinates: 50°48′8″N 22°46′52″E
- Country: Poland
- Voivodeship: Lublin
- County: Biłgoraj
- Gmina: Turobin

Population
  - Total: 284

Żurawie [ʐuˈravjɛ] is a village in the administrative district of Gmina Turobin, within Biłgoraj County, Lublin Voivodeship, in eastern Poland.
