= Tarnawa-Kolonia =

Village in south eastern Poland

- Location within Poland
- Coordinates: 50°51′13″N 22°39′9″E
- Country: Poland
- Voivodeship: Lublin
- County: Biłgoraj
- Gmina: Turobin
- Population: 72

Tarnawa-Kolonia [tarˈnava kɔˈlɔɲa] is a village in the administrative district of Gmina Turobin, within Biłgoraj County, Lublin Voivodeship, in eastern Poland.

== History ==
On 30 July 2026, a Russian Kh-101 cruise missile struck approximately 2 km (1.2 mi) from the village. This occurred during Russia's attacks on western Ukraine, part of the Russo-Ukrainian war.
