= Nowa Wieś, Biłgoraj County =

Nowa Wieś
- Village
- Location within Poland
- Coordinates: 50°47′34″N 22°50′50″E
- Country: Poland
- Voivodeship: Lublin
- County: Biłgoraj
- Gmina: Turobin

Population
  - Total: 253

Nowa Wieś [ˈnɔva ˈvjɛɕ] is a village in the administrative district of Gmina Turobin, within Biłgoraj County, Lublin Voivodeship, in eastern Poland.
