= Tokary, Lublin Voivodeship =

Tokary
- Village
- Location within Poland
- Coordinates: 50°48′12″N 22°38′20″E
- Country: Poland
- Voivodeship: Lublin
- County: Biłgoraj
- Gmina: Turobin

Population
  - Total: 368

Tokary [tɔˈkarɨ] is a village in the administrative district of Gmina Turobin, within Biłgoraj County, Lublin Voivodeship, in eastern Poland.
