= Elizówka, Biłgoraj County =

Elizówka
- Village
- Location within Poland
- Coordinates: 50°51′1″N 22°43′31″E
- Country: Poland
- Voivodeship: Lublin
- County: Biłgoraj
- Gmina: Turobin

Population
  - Total: 130

Elizówka [ɛliˈzufka] is a village in the administrative district of Gmina Turobin, within Biłgoraj County, Lublin Voivodeship, in eastern Poland.
