= Kh-101 =

Russian air-launched cruise missile

Kh-101/102 AS-23 Kodiak
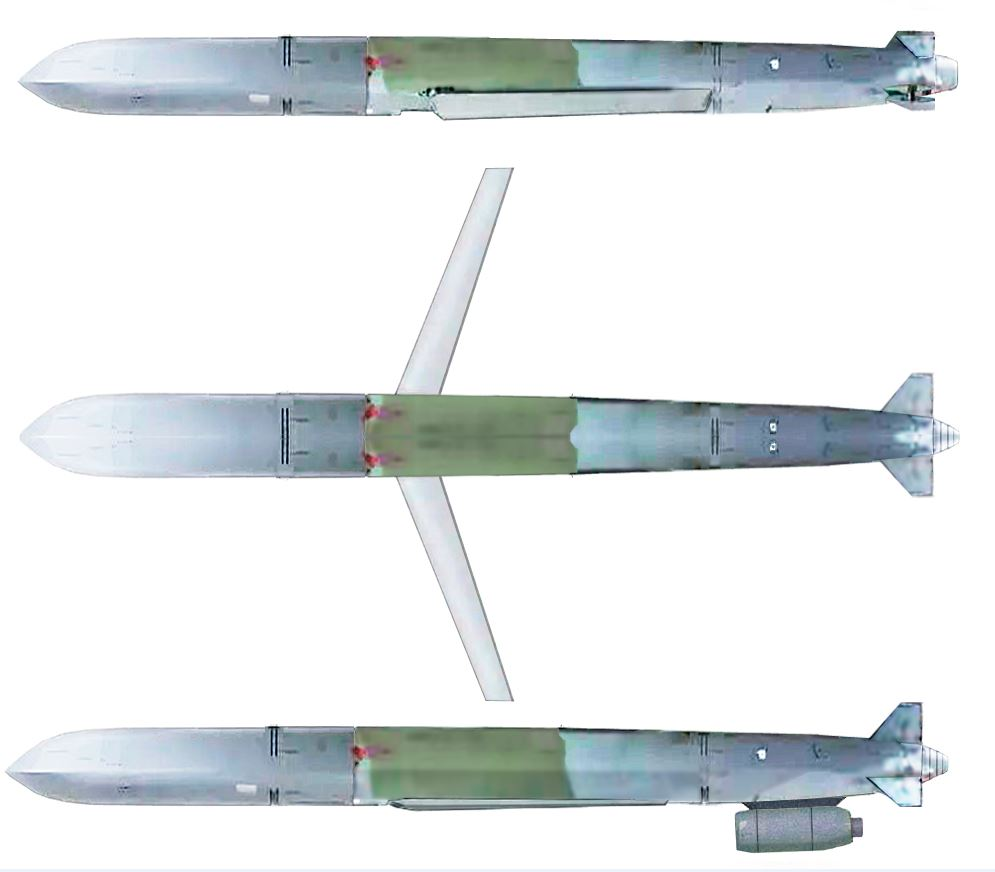
- Kh-101 missile. Above: as transported. Middle: as fired.
- Type: Air-launched cruise missile
- Place of origin: Russia

Service history
- Used by: Russian Aerospace Forces
- Wars: Syrian Civil War; Russo-Ukrainian war (2022–present)

Production history
- Manufacturer: MKB Raduga
- Unit cost: $2–2.4 million (domestic cost, FY 2025)

Specifications
- Mass: 2,400 kg (5,300 lb) (Kh-101)
- Length: 745 cm (24 ft 5 in) (Kh-101)
- Warhead: Conventional 400 kg (Kh-101), cluster submunition. Thermonuclear (Kh-102)
- Engine: TRDD-50A turbofan 450 kgf
- Propellant: Jet fuel
- Operational range: 3,500 km
- Maximum speed: Mach 0.6–0.78 (Kh-101)
- Guidance system: Inertial guidance with Doppler radar/terrain map updates
- Launch platform: Tu-95MS, Tu-160

The Kh-101 (Russian: Х-101; NATO reporting name: AS-23 "Kodiak") is a Russian air-launched cruise missile which operates at a maximum of Mach 0.8. Designed in the 1990s, it underwent testing in the 2000s and entered service in the 2010s, seeing use in the Syrian Civil War and the Russo-Ukrainian war.

The Kh-102 is a strategic version of the Kh-101, armed with a nuclear warhead; it has not been used. Designed by Igor Seleznyev of Raduga, it was developed as a replacement for the Kh-55 cruise missile with greater stealth.

== Development ==
In the late 1980s work began on a replacement for the Kh-55 cruise missile, with either conventional (Kh-101) or nuclear (Kh-102) warheads and greater stealth. The new missile was designed by Igor Seleznyev of Raduga. The importance of advanced missiles as "force multipliers" increased as Russia's fleet of available cruise-missile bombers declined in the early 1990s. The cancellation of the ambitious Kh-90 ramjet missile due to the INF Treaty in 1987 led to a renewed emphasis on improving on the Kh-55, in particular to achieve the <20 m accuracy required to hit infrastructure targets with conventional – as opposed to nuclear – warheads. The first flight of the Kh-101 was in 1998, and evaluation trials started in 2000.

The first tests were conducted in 1995 and the missile was accepted for service in 2012. The first pictures of the Kh-101 appeared in 2007.

== Design ==
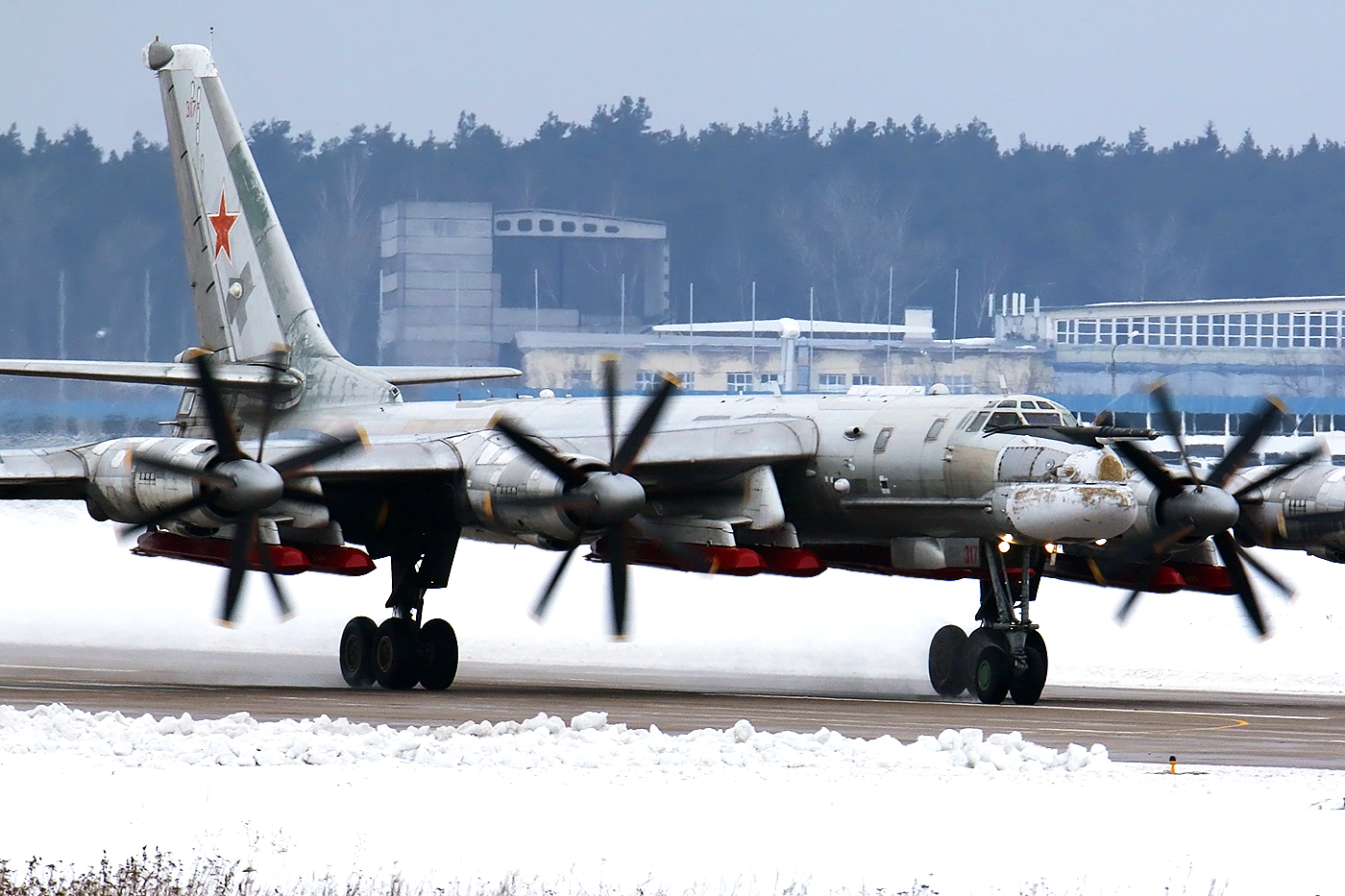
Kh-101 missiles under the wings of a Tupolev Tu-95

The Kh-101/102 is specifically designed for air launch, abandoning the circular fuselage cross-section of the Kh-55 for a nose and forward fuselage section aerodynamically shaped to produce lift. It is 7.45 m (24.4 ft) long with a launch weight of 2,200–2,400 kg (4,900–5,300 lb), and is equipped with a 400 kg (880 lb) high-explosive, penetrating, or cluster warhead, or a 250 kt nuclear warhead for the Kh-102. The missile is powered by a TRDD-50A turbofan producing 450 kgf of thrust to cruise at 700–720 km/h (Mach 0.57 – Mach 0.59) with a maximum speed of 970 km/h (Mach 0.79) while flying 30–70 m above the ground, and hit fixed targets using a pre-downloaded digital map for terrain following and GLONASS/INS for trajectory correction to achieve accuracy of 6–10 meters; it is claimed to be able to hit small moving targets such as vehicles using a terminal electro-optical sensor or imaging infrared system. The missiles are equipped with an onboard EW defence system as of late 2018. It has a range of around 3,500 km.

The Tu-95MS can carry eight of the weapons on under-wing pylons, and the Tu-160 can be outfitted with two drum launchers each loaded with six missiles.

The Kh-SD tactical version was to have been carried by the Tu-95MS (fourteen missiles) and the Tu-22M (eight missiles).

== Operational history ==
=== Syrian Civil War ===
Kh-101 launch by Tu-160 in Syria

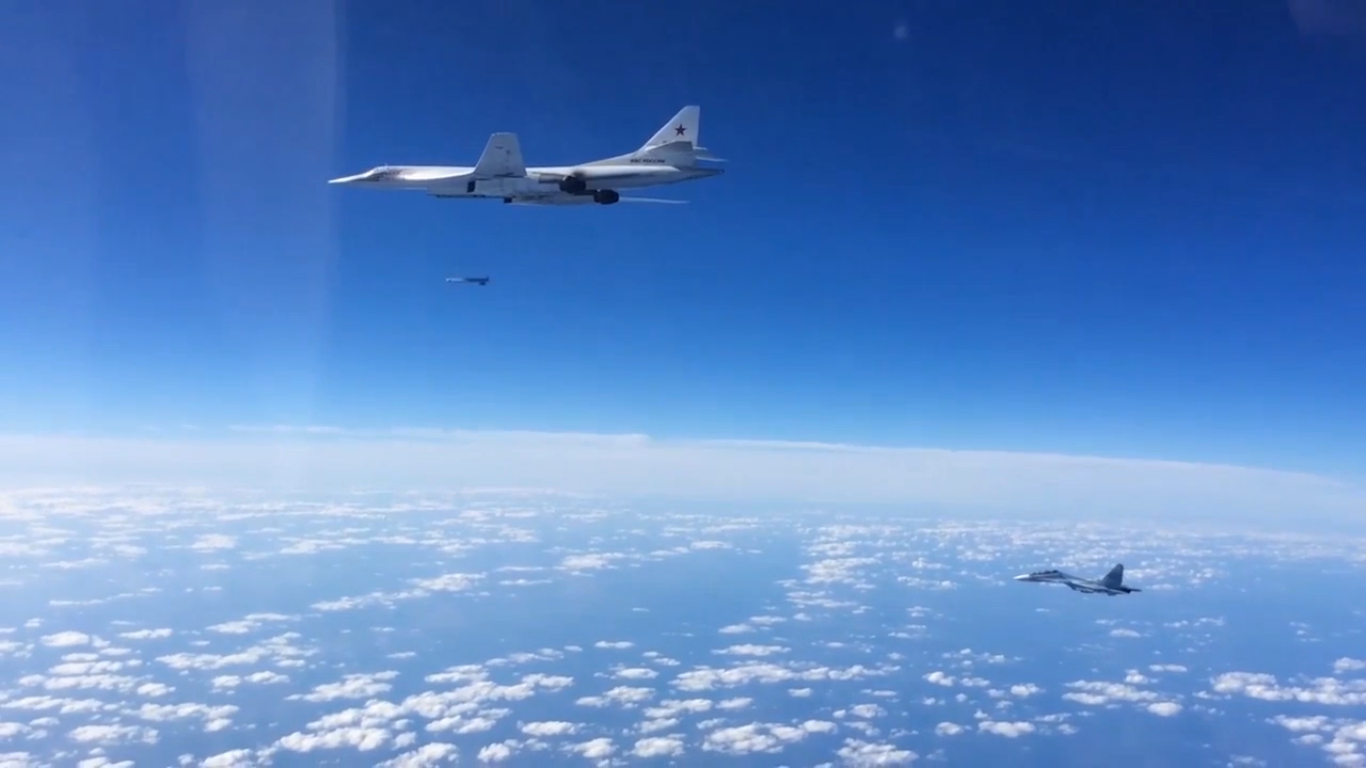
A Tu-160 bomber launching a Kh-101 cruise missile against targets in Syria, November 2015

In the course of the Russian bombing of Syria on 17 November 2015, Russian Defense Ministry reported that Tupolev Tu-95MS and Tupolev Tu-160 strategic bombers launched a total of 34 cruise missiles against 14 ISIL targets in Syria. While the Tu-95MS used the Kh-55 cruise missile, the Tu-160s were equipped with the Kh-101 in their first combat use.

Russian news agency TASS reported on 17 November 2016 that modernized Tu-95MS armed with Kh-55 and Kh-101 cruise missiles had launched airstrikes against targets in Syria.

On 17 February 2017, Tu-95MS strategic bombers, flying from the Russian territory through the airspace of Iran and Iraq, attacked purported ISIL facilities near the Syrian city of Raqqa with the Kh-101 cruise missiles. The targets included purported militant camps and training centers as well as a command center of a major ISIL unit. Russian Tu-95MS long-range bombers struck ISIL targets in Syria again on 5 July 2017, at a range of about 1,000 kilometers. On 26 September 2017, Russia's Tu-95MS strategic bombers carried out further missile strikes with Kh-101 on ISIL and the Syrian branch of al-Qaeda (now known as Hayat Tahrir al-Sham) in the provinces of Idlib and Deir Ezzor.

=== Russian invasion of Ukraine ===
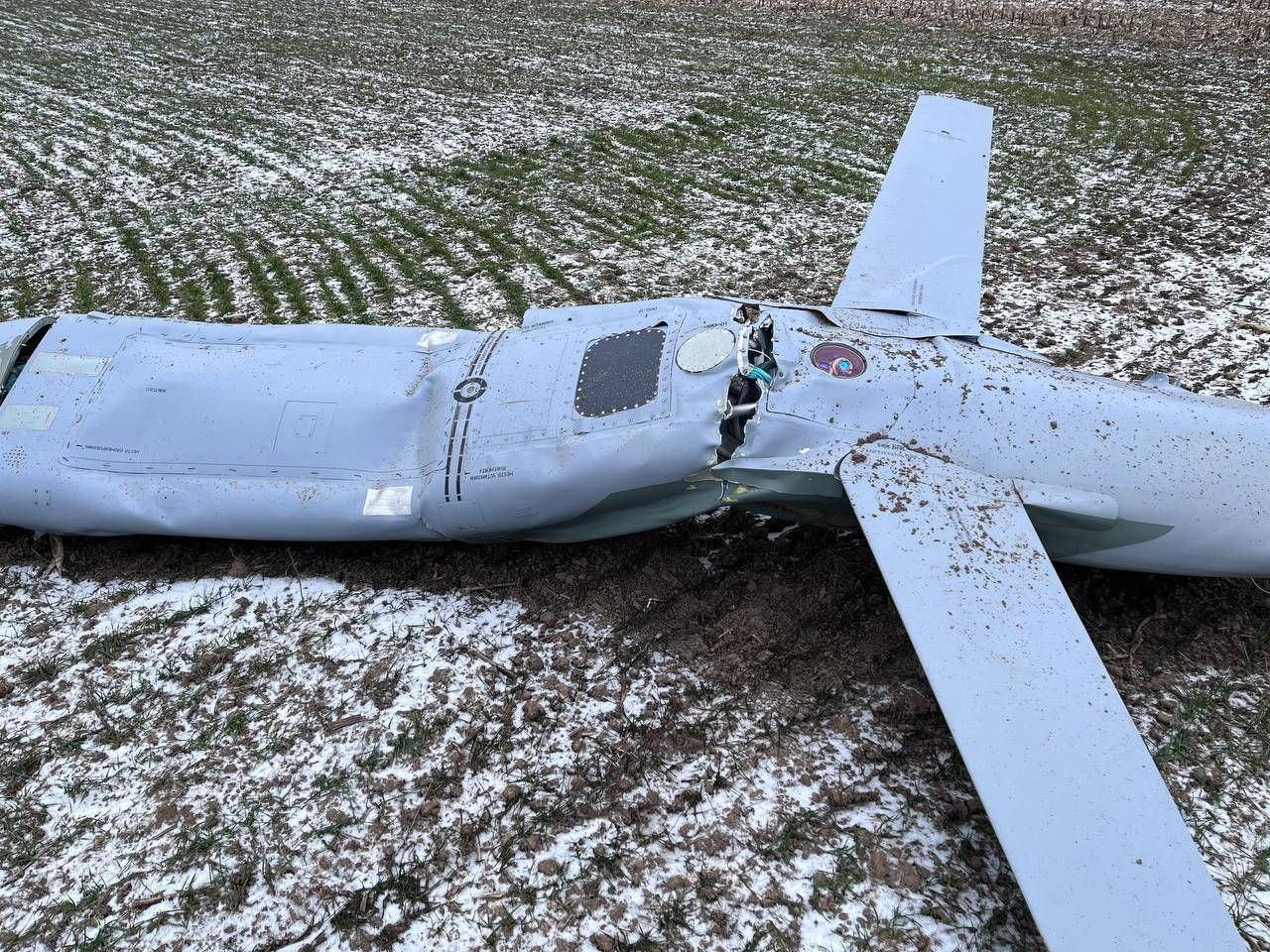
Kh-101 wreckage discovered on 26 January 2023 in Vinnytsia Oblast, Ukraine

The Kh-101 has been used extensively in the Russian invasion of Ukraine. US Department of Defense sources claimed that they experienced a significant failure rate: "either they're failing to launch, or they're failing to hit the target, or they're failing to explode on contact." Ukraine at War: Paving the Road from Survival to Victory, a July 2022 study published by the UK Royal United Services Institute (RUSI) for Defense and Security Studies, disagreed, noting that "as far as Ukrainian military scientists can determine, this is actually quite rare", with RUSI instead attributing the high rate of downed missiles to Ukrainian interception.

On 6 March 2022, about eight Kh-101 cruise missiles launched by Tu-160 and Tu-95MS strategic bombers from over the Black Sea targeted the Havryshivka Vinnytsia International Airport.

On 14 September 2022, Ukrainian MoD reported Russian forces used eight Kh-101 cruise missiles, probably from Tu-95MS bombers, to target various hydraulic structures in Kryvyi Rih. This caused the water level of the Inhulets river to rise sharply. Previously it was reported that Kh-22 missiles had been used.

Since late 2022, an upgraded version of the Kh‑101 has been observed featuring the L-504 decoy dispenser developed by the Samara Research Institute "Ekran". This dispenser allows the missile to release countermeasures such as chaff and flares to confuse and evade radar‑guided air defences. In addition, the missile has been enhanced with an Otblesk‑U optical guidance system, which compares real‑time terrain images with preloaded maps for improved targeting precision.

During the 29 December 2023 Russian strikes on Ukraine Kh-101s were seen deploying decoy flares.

According to Defense Express, analysis of wreckage and debris from a Kh-101 shot down over Ukraine in March 2024 indicates that starting from early 2024, the size of the Kh-101 warhead was increased from 450 kg to 800 kg. This increase was made possible by reducing the capacity of the fuel tank, which accordingly lowers the range of the missile.

During the 8 July 2024 missile attacks six Kh-101 missiles hit the building of the Artem military plant in Kyiv. Another Russian Kh-101 missile hit the Okhmatdyt children's hospital in Kyiv in the same attack. One doctor and one adult civilian were killed and 16 people, including seven children, were injured. The Russian Ministry of Foreign Affairs denied that Russia hit the hospital and claimed the destruction was caused by a Ukrainian air defense missile. Pro-Russian sources variously described it as "an American Patriot air defense missile" or an AIM-120 AMRAAM. Footage of the attack shows a Kh-101 cruise missile striking the hospital, with the United Nations Human Rights Monitoring Mission in Ukraine assessing a direct missile hit to have been 'highly likely'. Images also showed remnants of a Kh-101 missile in the ruins of the hospital.

Financial Times reported on 10 July 2024, citing an analysis by the Office of the President of Ukraine, that Russia surged the production of Kh-101 by eight times from 56 missiles before the war to 420 missiles in 2023 and also claimed that the missile uses more than 50 Western-made components.

On the early morning of September 2, 2024, 14 Kh-101 missiles, part of a larger attack from Tu-95MS planes from Volgograd, were launched. Also, on the same day, fragments of a missile, allegedly the remains of a Kh-101, were removed in Kyiv.

According to classified documents, Russia ordered 525 missiles in 2024, 700 in 2025, and 30 for delivery in 2026 (as of October 2025).

In the morning of November 19, 2025, a Kh-101 missile hit an apartment building in Ternopil killing 31 residents.

In the early hours of July 30, 2026, during a large-scale Russian missile strike on western Ukraine, two cruise missiles, believed to be Kh-101s, headed toward the Polish border. According to Polish Prime Minister Donald Tusk, Ukrainian fighter jets pursued the missiles all the way to the border in an attempt to destroy them before they could enter Polish airspace. At approximately 3:40 a.m., one of the missiles crossed into Polish airspace and impacted near the village of Tarnawa-Kolonia, about 45 km (28 miles) south of Lublin, leaving a crater roughly 10 meters (33 feet) in diameter. The presence of Ukrainian MiG-29 fighter aircraft operating near the border, whose radar signatures while pursuing the cruise missiles were difficult to distinguish from the missiles themselves, delayed visual identification and the decision on whether to intercept the incoming object by Polish F-16 fighter jets.

== Variants ==
- Kh-101 (NATO AS-23A "Kodiak") – conventional variant. Since January 2023, 11 months after the beginning of the Russian invasion of Ukraine, Russia has made use of a Kh-101 air-launched version that releases decoy flares in flight.
  - A variant of the Kh-101 has been used in the Russo-Ukrainian War, with a second high explosive warhead containing steel fragments. Increasing the total warhead weight from 450 kg to about 800 kg, this comes at the expense of range due to reduced fuel capacity.
- Kh-102 (NATO AS-23B "Kodiak") – nuclear variant.
