= 2025 Ternopil strike =

Russian attack in Ukraine

November 2025 Ternopil apartment strike
- Part of the Russo-Ukrainian war (2022–present) and Russian strikes against Ukrainian infrastructure
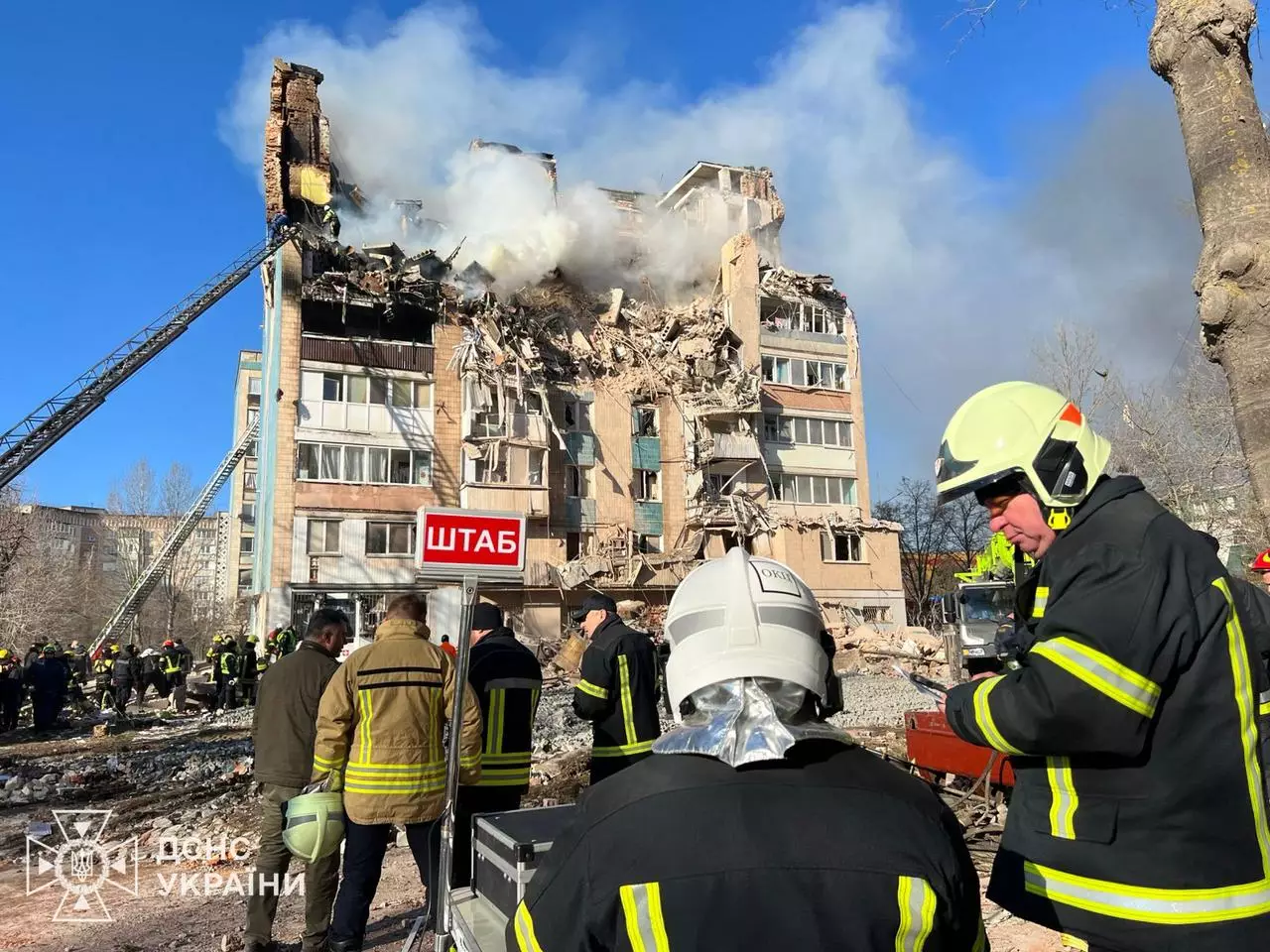
- Ternopil after Russian attack in the morning of 19 November 2025
- Location: Ternopil, Ukraine; 49°33′29.23″N 25°38′51.55″E
- Target: Apartment building in Ternopil, Ukraine
- Date: 19 November 2025
- Executed by: Russia
- Casualties: 38 killed 94 injured

The 19 November 2025 Ternopil missile strike was a large-scale airstrike conducted by Russian armed forces against the city of Ternopil in Western Ukraine. The attack, carried out in the early morning hours of 19 November 2025, targeted two residential apartment buildings, killing at least 38 people, including seven children, and injuring over 120 others. The strike is considered one of the deadliest attacks on western Ukraine since the start of the Russo-Ukrainian war in 2022.

== Background ==
By November 2025, Russia had substantially escalated its use of long-range missiles and drone swarms in what analysts described as a winter campaign targeting Ukraine's energy infrastructure and civilian population centers. While eastern and central Ukraine had faced constant bombardment throughout the conflict, the western regions, particularly Ternopil located approximately 370 kilometers from Kyiv, had been perceived as relatively safer, attracting internally displaced persons and humanitarian operations.

On 19 November 2025, concurrent with the Ternopil strike, Ukrainian President Volodymyr Zelenskyy was engaged in diplomatic efforts to restart peace talks, having met with Turkish President Recep Tayyip Erdoğan and U.S. officials in Ankara.

== Events ==
In the early hours of 19 November 2025, Russian strategic bombers conducted a coordinated attack across Ukraine utilizing hundreds of drones and cruise missiles. According to the Ukrainian Air Force, Russia launched 476 drones and 48 missiles, with Ukrainian forces intercepting 442 drones and 41 missiles.

Six Tu-95MS and four Tu-160MS strategic bombers, operating from Russia's Vologda and Astrakhan Oblasts, fired Kh-101 cruise missiles at targets across Ukraine. Video analysis conducted by Ukrainian monitoring channel AirGuard and confirmed by Ukraine's Air Force Command identified Kh-101 cruise missiles as the primary weapons used in Ternopil.

The missile strike directly impacted two nine-story residential apartment buildings in Ternopil between the third and ninth floors. According to Interior Minister Ihor Klymenko, one missile struck a building on Stusa Street, while a second residential building on 15 Kvitnia Street was also hit. The missile released infrared countermeasures in its final approach, bypassing Ukrainian air defense systems.

The explosions triggered massive fires that rapidly engulfed the upper floors of both buildings. Emergency services deployed more than 230 rescue workers from nine Ukrainian regions to conduct search and recovery operations.

Large fires in the area caused chlorine levels in the surrounding air to spike to six times the permissible norm, prompting local authorities to urge residents to seal windows and remain indoors to avoid chemical exposure.

== Casualties and damage ==
By 8 December 2025, the confirmed death toll reached 38, including seven children.

Between 73 and 122 people were injured, with many suffering severe burns and trauma. As of 20 November, approximately 22 people remained missing and unaccounted for. By 20 November, approximately 950 square meters of reinforced concrete structures had been dismantled and 460 tons of construction waste removed during ongoing rescue operations.

Two residential high-rise buildings sustained partial destruction, and significant damage was inflicted on the city's energy infrastructure, contributing to widespread power outages across the region.

== Reactions ==
=== Ukraine ===
President Volodymyr Zelenskyy described the attack as a "brazen attack on ordinary life" and emphasized that "every brazen attack on normal life indicates that the pressure on Russia is insufficient." He called for stronger international pressure on Russia and increased military support for Ukraine's air defense systems.

In meetings with U.S. Secretary of the Army Daniel P. Driscoll on 20 November, Zelenskyy presented detailed information on the foreign components found in the Kh-101 missile and requested U.S. assistance in disrupting procurement and supply chains that delivered sanctioned components to Russia.

Interior Minister Ihor Klymenko oversaw rescue operations, describing walking "between the burnt walls" and reflecting that "in each apartment – a whole life that Russia destroyed in an instant".

=== International ===
UN secretary-general António Guterres and Assistant Secretary General, Resident & Humanitarian Coordinator Ukraine Matthias Schmale condemned the attacks and called for a ceasefire.

Poland, a NATO member sharing a border with western Ukraine, deployed fighter jets and activated ground-based air defense systems along with radar reconnaissance units in response to the Russian assault. According to the Polish Armed Forces, these actions were "preventive in nature" and focused on "securing and protecting the airspace, particularly in areas adjacent to the threatened regions". Spain and Sweden provided additional air support, while Germany's Bundeswehr deployed Patriot air defense systems to strengthen Polish defenses.

Romania also implemented air defense measures in response to the missile barrage's proximity to its territory.

=== Russia ===
The Russian Defense Ministry did not specifically acknowledge striking civilian residential buildings. Instead, it claimed that its forces had successfully targeted "defense industry and energy facilities that supported their operations, as well as long-range drone storage sites in western Ukraine", asserting that "all intended targets were hit and the objectives of the strike were achieved".

Russia claimed that the overnight strikes were in retaliation for Ukrainian attacks on Russian territory, alleging that Ukrainian forces had launched four ATACMS missiles at Voronezh in southern Russia, though Ukraine's military later acknowledged that it had indeed targeted Russian military facilities.

== See also ==
- 29 December 2023 Russian strikes on Ukraine
- February 2025 Poltava strike
- Hroza missile attack
- Kramatorsk railway station attack
- Mariupol theatre airstrike
- Russian attacks on civilians in the Russo-Ukrainian war (2022–present)
