= Guzówka-Kolonia =

- Village
- Location within Poland
- Coordinates: 50°51′N 22°42′E
- Country: Poland
- Voivodeship: Lublin
- County: Biłgoraj
- Gmina: Turobin

Population
  - Total: 398

Guzówka-Kolonia [ɡuˈzufka kɔˈlɔɲa] is a village in the administrative district of Gmina Turobin, within Biłgoraj County, Lublin Voivodeship, in eastern Poland.
