= Wólka Czernięcińska =

- Village
- Location within Poland
- Coordinates: 50°46′37″N 22°48′39″E
- Country: Poland
- Voivodeship: Lublin
- County: Biłgoraj
- Gmina: Turobin

Population
  - Total: 185

Wólka Czernięcińska [ˈvulka t͡ʂɛrɲɛnˈt͡ɕiɲska] is a village in the administrative district of Gmina Turobin, within Biłgoraj County, Lublin Voivodeship, in eastern Poland.
