= Tarnawa Mała =

- Village
- Location within Poland
- Coordinates: 50°50′3″N 22°41′58″E
- Country: Poland
- Voivodeship: Lublin
- County: Biłgoraj
- Gmina: Turobin

Population
  - Total: 245

Tarnawa Mała [tarˈnava ˈmawa] is a village in the administrative district of Gmina Turobin, within Biłgoraj County, Lublin Voivodeship, in eastern Poland.
