= Żabno, Lublin Voivodeship =

Żabno
- Village
- Location within Poland
- Coordinates: 50°50′56″N 22°46′38″E
- Country: Poland
- Voivodeship: Lublin
- County: Biłgoraj
- Gmina: Turobin

Population
  - Total: 536
- Time zone: UTC+1 (CET)
  - Summer (DST): UTC+2 (CEST)

Żabno [ˈʐabnɔ] is a village in the administrative district of Gmina Turobin, within Biłgoraj County, Lublin Voivodeship, in eastern Poland.

== History ==
Six Polish citizens were murdered by Nazi Germany in the village during World War II.
