= Załawcze =

- Village
- Location within Poland
- Coordinates: 50°48′45″N 22°44′33″E
- Country: Poland
- Voivodeship: Lublin
- County: Biłgoraj
- Gmina: Turobin

Population
  - Total: 215

Załawcze [zaˈwaft͡ʂɛ] is a village in the administrative district of Gmina Turobin, within Biłgoraj County, Lublin Voivodeship, in eastern Poland.
