= Przedmieście Szczebrzeszyńskie =

- Village
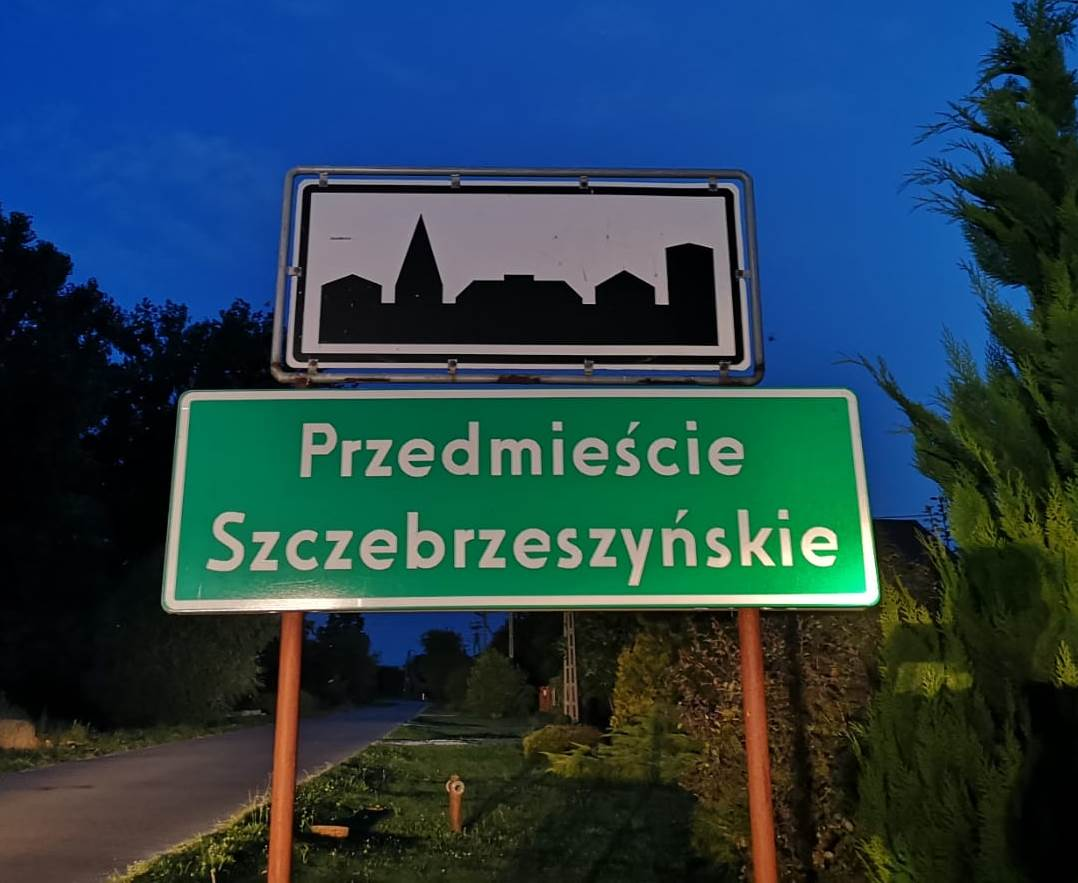

- Location within Poland
- Coordinates: 50°49′8″N 22°45′25″E
- Country: Poland
- Voivodeship: Lublin
- County: Biłgoraj
- Gmina: Turobin

Population
  - Total: 386

Przedmieście Szczebrzeszyńskie [pʂɛdˈmjɛɕt͡ɕɛ ʂt͡ʂɛbʐɛˈʂɨɲskʲɛ] is a village in the administrative district of Gmina Turobin, within Biłgoraj County, Lublin Voivodeship, in eastern Poland.
