= Olszanka, Biłgoraj County =

Olszanka
- Village
- Location within Poland
- Coordinates: 50°49′14″N 22°42′59″E
- Country: Poland
- Voivodeship: Lublin
- County: Biłgoraj
- Gmina: Turobin

Population
  - Total: 192
- Time zone: UTC+1 (CET)
  - Summer (DST): UTC+2 (CEST)

Olszanka [ɔlˈʂaŋka] is a village in the administrative district of Gmina Turobin, within Biłgoraj County, Lublin Voivodeship, in eastern Poland. 13 Polish citizens were murdered by Nazi Germany in the village during World War II.
