= Turobin =

- Town
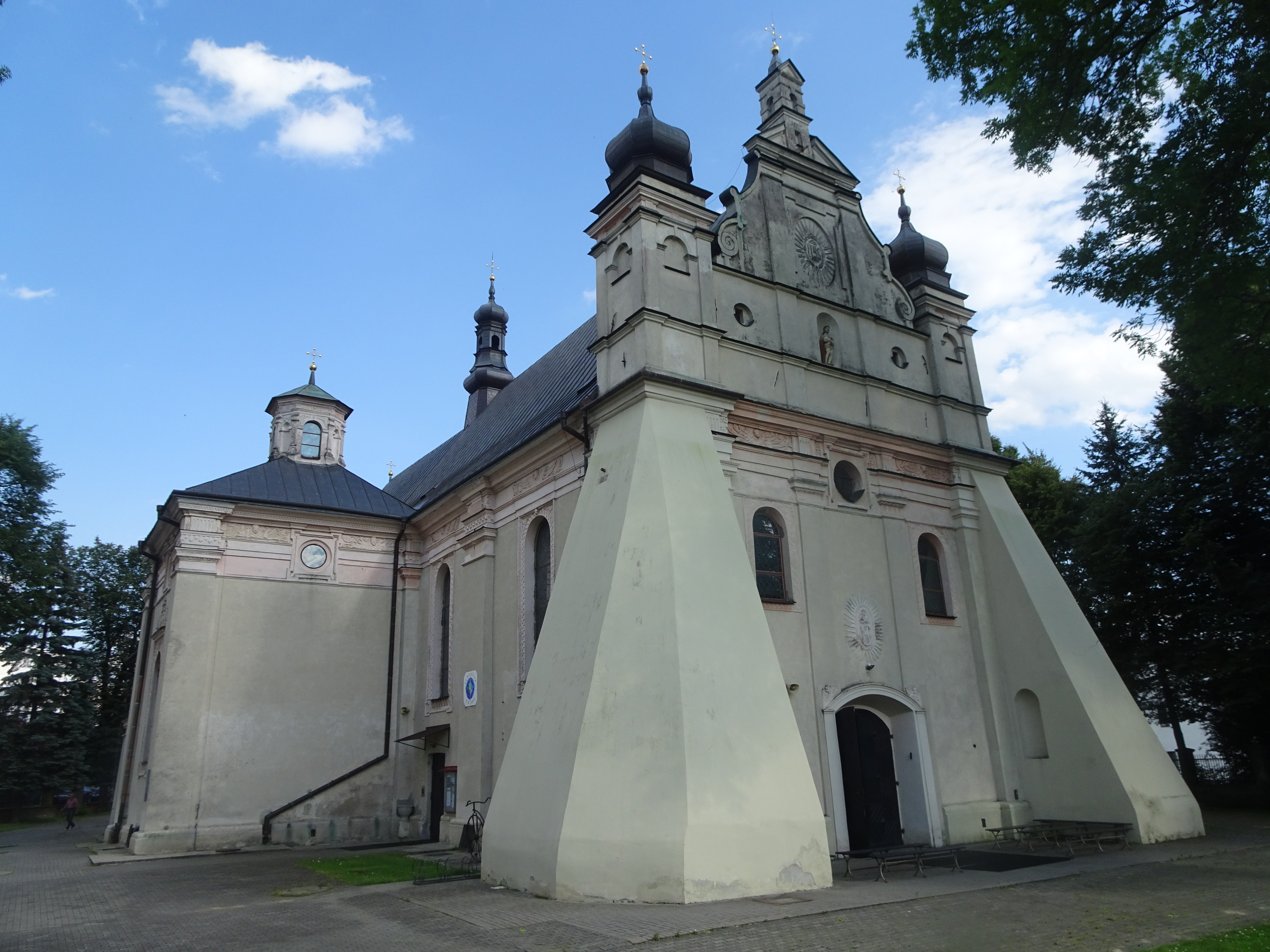
- Lublin Renaissance Church of Saint Dominic

- Flag Coat of arms

- Location within Poland
- Coordinates: 50°49′30″N 22°44′40″E
- Country: Poland
- Voivodeship: Lublin
- County: Biłgoraj
- Gmina: Turobin
- Town rights: 1420

Population
  - Total: 1,036
- Time zone: UTC+1 (CET)
  - Summer (DST): UTC+2 (CEST)
- Vehicle registration: LBL

Turobin [tuˈrɔbin] is a town in Biłgoraj County, Lublin Voivodeship, in eastern Poland. It is the seat of the gmina (administrative district) called Gmina Turobin.

== History ==
Turobin was a royal village, which in 1389 was granted by King Władysław II Jagiełło to Dymitr from nearby Goraj, podskarbi of previous King Louis I. Turobin was granted town rights by King Władysław II Jagiełło in 1420. It was fortified by ramparts with three gates. It was a private town of various Polish nobles, including the Górka family, whose Łodzia coat of arms remains the municipal coat of arms today.

The town was annexed by Austria in the late-18th-century Partitions of Poland. After the Polish victory in the Austro-Polish War of 1809, it became part of the short-lived Duchy of Warsaw, and after the duchy's dissolution in 1815, it fell to the Russian Partition of Poland. The town saw an influx of Jews as a result of Russian discriminatory policies (see Pale of Settlement). The first synagogue was built after 1825. By the late 19th century, the population was 39.2% Jewish. In 1869, the Tsarist authorities revoked the town rights as punishment for the unsuccessful Polish January Uprising. During World War I, Turobin was devastated by Austrian troops.

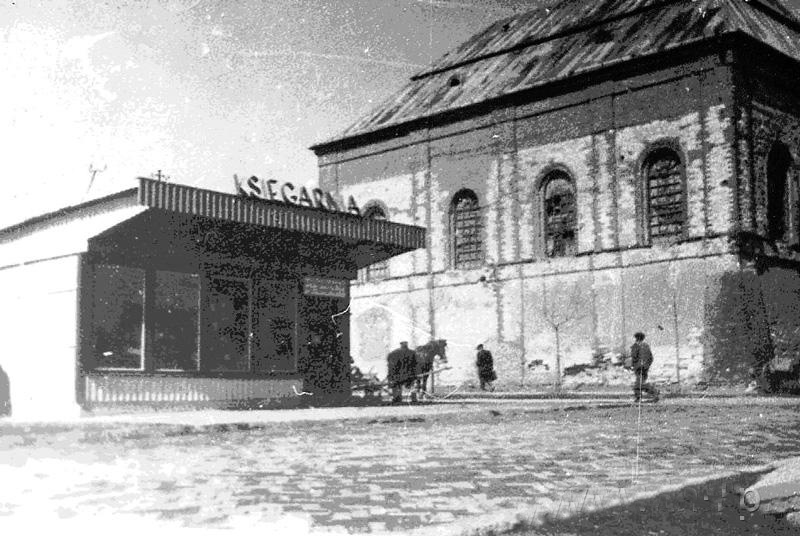
Bookstore and synagogue in Turobin in the interwar period

In the interwar period, it was administratively located in the Lublin Voivodeship of Poland. According to the 1921 census, the settlement with the adjacent manor farm had a population of 1,660, 54.8% Jewish and 45.2% Polish.

During the German-Soviet invasion of Poland at the start of World War II in September 1939, the town was invaded by Germany. Several Poles who were either born or lived and worked in Turobin were murdered by the Russians in the Katyn massacre in 1940. Jews from the nearby town of Wysokie and from other locations in Poland such as Lublin, Łódź, Koło, Konin and Słupsk were sent to the Turobin ghetto. In May 1942, a group of 3,000 Jews from the Turobin ghetto was sent to Krasnystaw, from which they were dispatched to their deaths at Sobibór. On 18 October 1942, the remaining Jews were dispatched to Trawniki or Bełżec, where they met a certain death. A survivor of the Sobibór death camp, Josef Kopf, was murdered by one of his former Polish neighbors in 1944 when he returned to Turobin.
