= Gródki, Lublin Voivodeship =

Gródki
- Village
- Location within Poland
- Coordinates: 50°46′34″N 22°41′21″E
- Country: Poland
- Voivodeship: Lublin
- County: Biłgoraj
- Gmina: Turobin

Population
  - Total: 579
- Website: http://grodki.pl.tl/

Gródki [ˈɡrutki] is a village in the administrative district of Gmina Turobin, within Biłgoraj County, Lublin Voivodeship, in eastern Poland.
