= Biłgoraj =

Town in Lublin Voivodeship, Poland

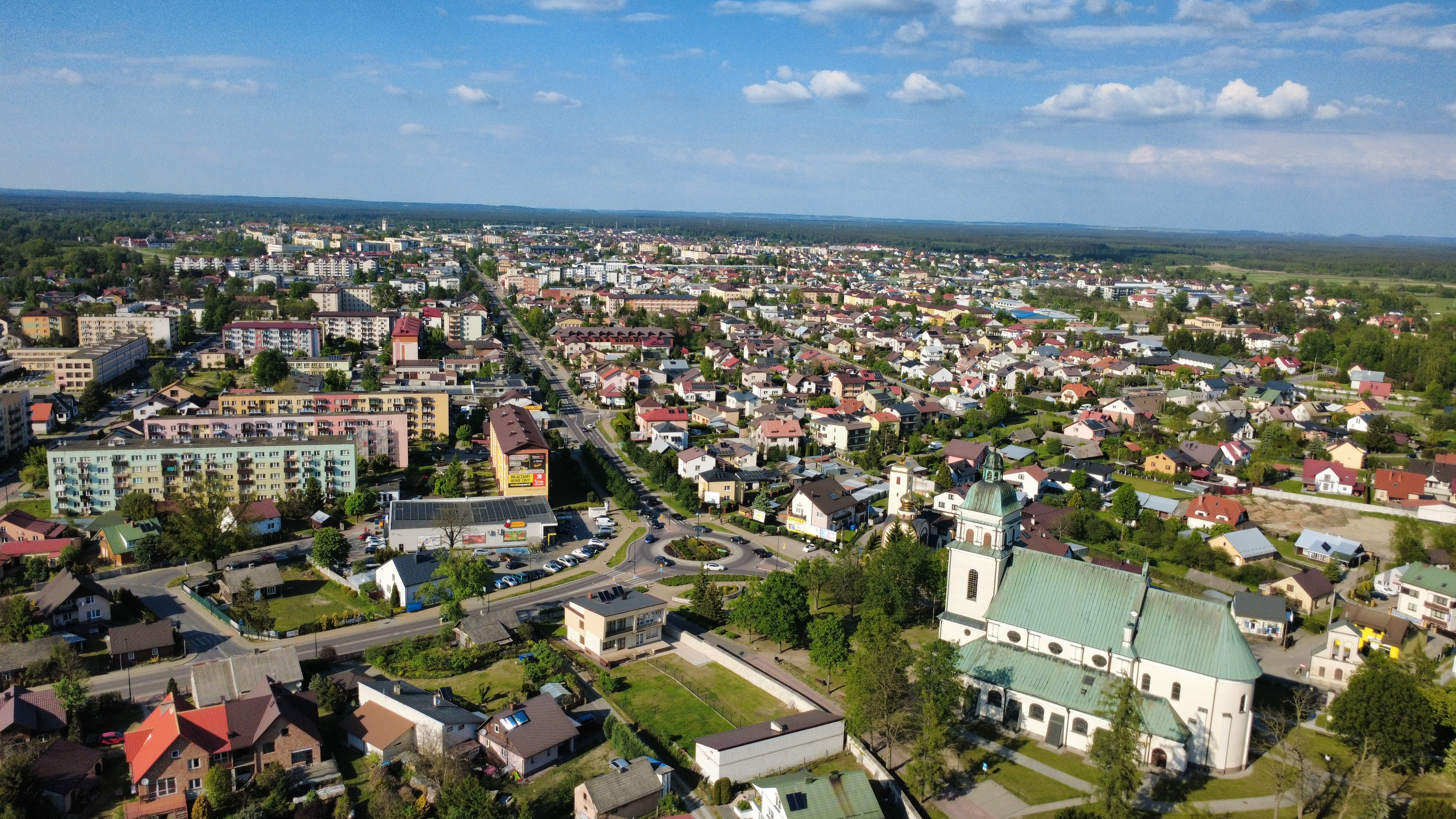
- Aerial view of Biłgoraj

- Flag Coat of arms
- Interactive map of Biłgoraj
- Location within Poland Location within Europe Location within Lublin Voivodeship
- Coordinates: 50°33′N 22°44′E
- Country: Poland
- Voivodeship: Lublin
- County: Biłgoraj
- Gmina: Biłgoraj (urban gmina)
- Established: 1578
- Town rights: 1578
- Founded by: Adam Gorajski

Government
  - Mayor: Wojciech Gleń

Area
  - Total: 21.1 km^{2} (8.1 sq mi)
- Highest elevation: 212 m (696 ft)
- Lowest elevation: 184 m (604 ft)

Population (31 December 2021)
  - Total: 25,838
  - Density: 1,225/km^{2} (3,170/sq mi)
- Time zone: UTC+1 (CET)
  - Summer (DST): UTC+2 (CEST)
- Postal code: 23-400 to 23-401
- Area code: +48 84
- Car plates: LBL
- Website: www.bilgoraj.pl

Biłgoraj [bʲiwˈɡɔraj] (Yiddish: בילגאריי, Bilgoray) is a town in Lublin Voivodeship, in south-eastern Poland with 25,838 inhabitants as of December 2021. It is located south of Lublin and it is also the capital of Biłgoraj County. Historically, the town belongs to Lesser Poland. Biłgoraj is surrounded by a forest, with three rivers flowing through it.

== Etymology ==
The name of the town probably comes from a hill called Biely Goraj, on which Biłgoraj was founded in the 16th century.

== Geography ==
Biłgoraj lies in northern part of Sandomierz Basin, near Roztocze. The town is surrounded by Solska Forest, 20 km (12 mi) from Roztocze National Park. An average July temperature in Biłgoraj is 18 °C (64 °F), an average January temperature −2.8 °C (27.0 °F). The town is crossed by four small rivers: Biała Łada, Czarna Łada, Osa and Próchnica. Biłgoraj lies on the elevations ranging from 184 to 212 meters above sea level. The area of the town is 20 square kilometres (8 square miles), of which forests covers 9%. Built-up area stretches along eastern bank of the Biała Łada, for 5 km (3 mi) (north–south) and 3 km (2 mi) (west–east).

== History ==
=== Foundation and early history ===
Korczak coat of arms of the Gorajski family, founders and benefactors of Biłgoraj, contained in the town's coat of arms

The area of current Biłgoraj was covered by dense forests and swamps, where establishment of human settlements was difficult. In the first half of the 16th century, local noble family of Gorajski built first settlements in this sparsely populated corner of Lesser Poland. At that time, the villages of Gromada, Dąbrowica and Olendrów were founded.

The town of Biłgoraj was officially established in 1570 by Adam Gorajski, and incorporated by King Stephen Báthory at Lwów on 10 September 1578. Its main market square was placed on the hill called Biały Goraj. The town, surrounded by rivers, held a strategic position and was easy to defend. Biłgoraj quickly grew, due to a busy merchant road from Jarosław to Lublin. Biłgoraj town was surrounded by a defensive wall with watchtowers, although the town's further growth extended into suburbs. A bridge was built over the Biala Lada. Until 1693 Biłgoraj remained in the hands of the Gorajski family. Throughout the 18th century, it belonged either to the Szczuka family or the Potocki family. Most houses in Biłgoraj were made of wood, which resulted in several fires. Furthermore, the wars of the mid-17th century destroyed the town twice; first in 1648, when the town was burned by the Cossacks of Bohdan Khmelnytsky; then in 1655, by the Swedes during the deluge.

=== Late modern period ===
Biłgoraj was an important center of the Bar Confederation, and in the area of the town several skirmishes took place between the Poles and the Russians. The town was annexed by Austria in the Third Partition of Poland in 1795. After the Polish victory in the Austro-Polish War of 1809, it became part of the short-lived Duchy of Warsaw, and after the duchy's dissolution in 1815, it became part of Russian-controlled Congress Poland. In the late 18th century its population was 3,000; and grew to 6,000 by 1865. At that time, it was the third biggest town of Lublin Governorate, after Lublin and Hrubieszów.

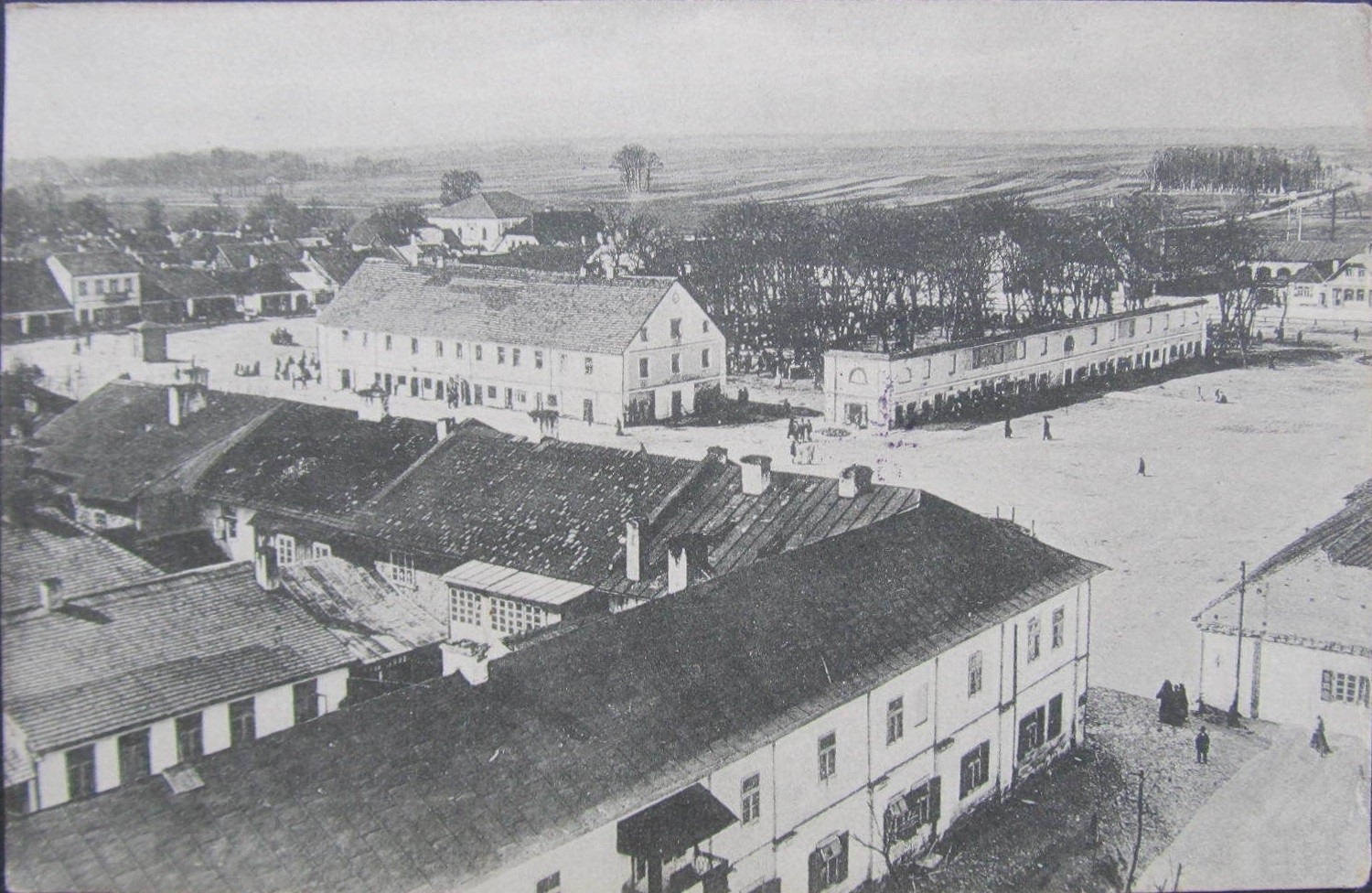
Early-20th-century view of Biłgoraj

In 1806, Biłgoraj – which was still privately owned and on the verge of bankruptcy – was purchased by the local entrepreneur named Stanisław Nowakowski, who built for himself a palace in Biłgoraj's district of Roznowka, modelled after Warsaw's famous Łazienki Palace. The town remained in the hands of the Nowakowski family until 1850, when it was sold to the Tsarist official Nikolay Platonov, and in 1864 appropriated by the government as the seat of a county. During the January Uprising, several skirmishes took place Biłgoraj and its vicinity.

After World War I, in 1918, Biłgoraj returned to newly created Second Polish Republic. Its population in 1921 reached 5,600. In 1928, electrification reached the town, but Biłgoraj nevertheless remained poor and underdeveloped, where most houses were constructed of wood. Historically, the town was a center of a large Jewish community, whose population in 1931 reached 4,596.

=== World War II ===
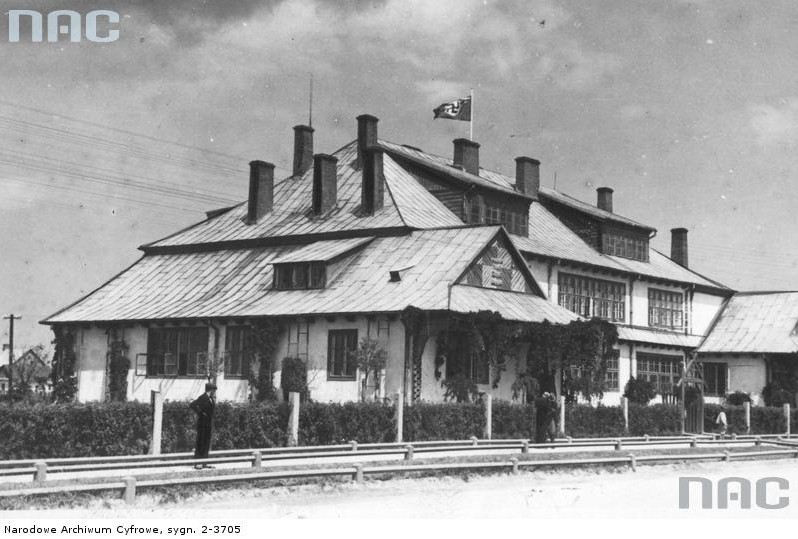
County office under German occupation

On 11 September 1939 a unit of German-minority fifth column agents set fire to the town, which destroyed most of it. A few days later Nazi German troops entered the town and immediately organized anti-Jewish pogroms. Furthermore, the Luftwaffe bombed Biłgoraj twice (8 and 14 September). On 15–16 September 1939, units of Kraków Army and Lublin Army retreating towards Tomaszow Lubelski, fought the Wehrmacht in the Battle of Biłgoraj. The Germans tried to capture the towns several times, but they did not manage to do so until 17 September, after yet another fire. On 28 September, units of the Red Army entered Biłgoraj, but they retreated after a few weeks, and the town became part of the Nazi-ruled General Government. On 25 June 1940 a ghetto was established.

During the German occupation, Biłgoraj was an important center of the resistance. Local units of the Home Army and other clandestine organizations took part in the Zamość Uprising. Germans knew well that Solska Forest was filled with Polish partisans, and the Poles frequently attacked German units in Biłgoraj. The most famous incident of this kind took place on 24 September 1943, when a Home Army unit under Tadeusz Sztumberk-Rychter attacked Biłgoraj's prison, releasing 72 inmates, including Ludwik Ehrlich.

There was also Jewish partisan resistance in the Bilgoraj area. On 17 and 26 August 1943, two other clashes are recorded: one in the village of Podgranicznik, 30 km (19 mi) northwest of Krasnystaw, in which two Jews were killed; and another in the village of Poreba, 26 km (16 mi) east of Biłgoraj, between a large partisan unit and the Nazi German Truppenzpolizei.

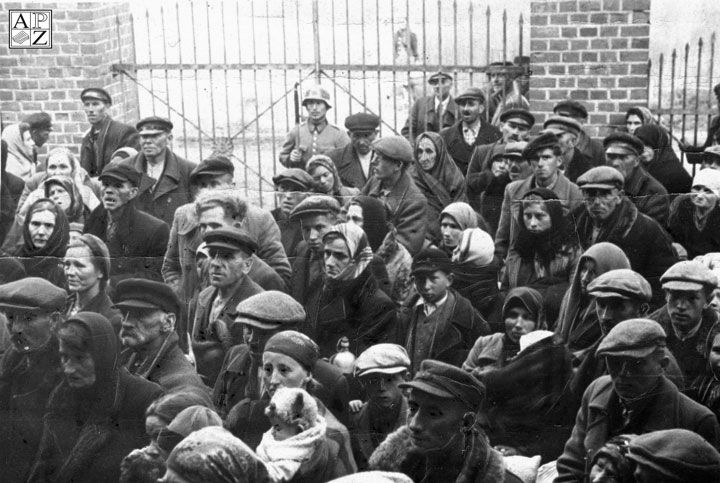
Expulsion of Poles by Nazi Germany in 1943

Six transports to Belzec gas chambers took place from Biłgoraj: 500 Jews in April 1942; 1,000 Jews in May 1942; 1,200 Jews in August 1942; 5,000 Jews in September 1942; 500 Jews in October 1942; and 2,000 Jews in November 1942. On 15 January 1943 the last 27 survivors who had remained in hiding were shot. Very few of the Jewish partisans from Biłgoraj survived the war due to great efforts by the Nazi Germans to hunt them down in the woods.

Most of Biłgoraj's Jews were murdered in the Holocaust. Only around 50 Jews survived the war. The Germans left Biłgoraj on 24 July 1944. During the war, 80% of the town was destroyed, and it lost 50% of its population.

=== Post-war ===
After 1945 Biłgoraj was rebuilt, becoming by 1975 a regional industrial center. The town was a part of the Lublin Voivodeship from 1945 to 1975, Zamość Voivodeship from 1975 to 1998, and once again in Lublin Voivodeship since 1999.

== Districts ==
Biłgoraj is divided into twelve districts:

- I. Śródmieście
  - 1. Dist. Przemysłowa
- II. Nadstawna
- III. Roztocze
  - 2. Dist. Łąkowa I
  - 3. Dist. Łąkowa II
- IV. Bojary
  - 4. Dist. Bojary
- V. Rapy
- VI. Sitarska - Kępy
  - 5. Dist. Sitarska I
  - 6. Dist. Sitarska II
  - 7. Dist. Sportowa
- VII. Ogrody
- VIII. Piaski
  - 8. Dist. Prusa
  - 9. Dist. Leśnik
- IX. Puszcza Solska
  - 10. Dist. Sienkiewicza
  - 11. Dist. Krzeszowska
  - 12. Dist. Południe
- X. Rożnówka
  - 13. Dist. Wioska Dziecięca
- XI. Bagienna
  - 14. Dist. Bagienna
- XII. Batorego

== Historic places and buildings ==
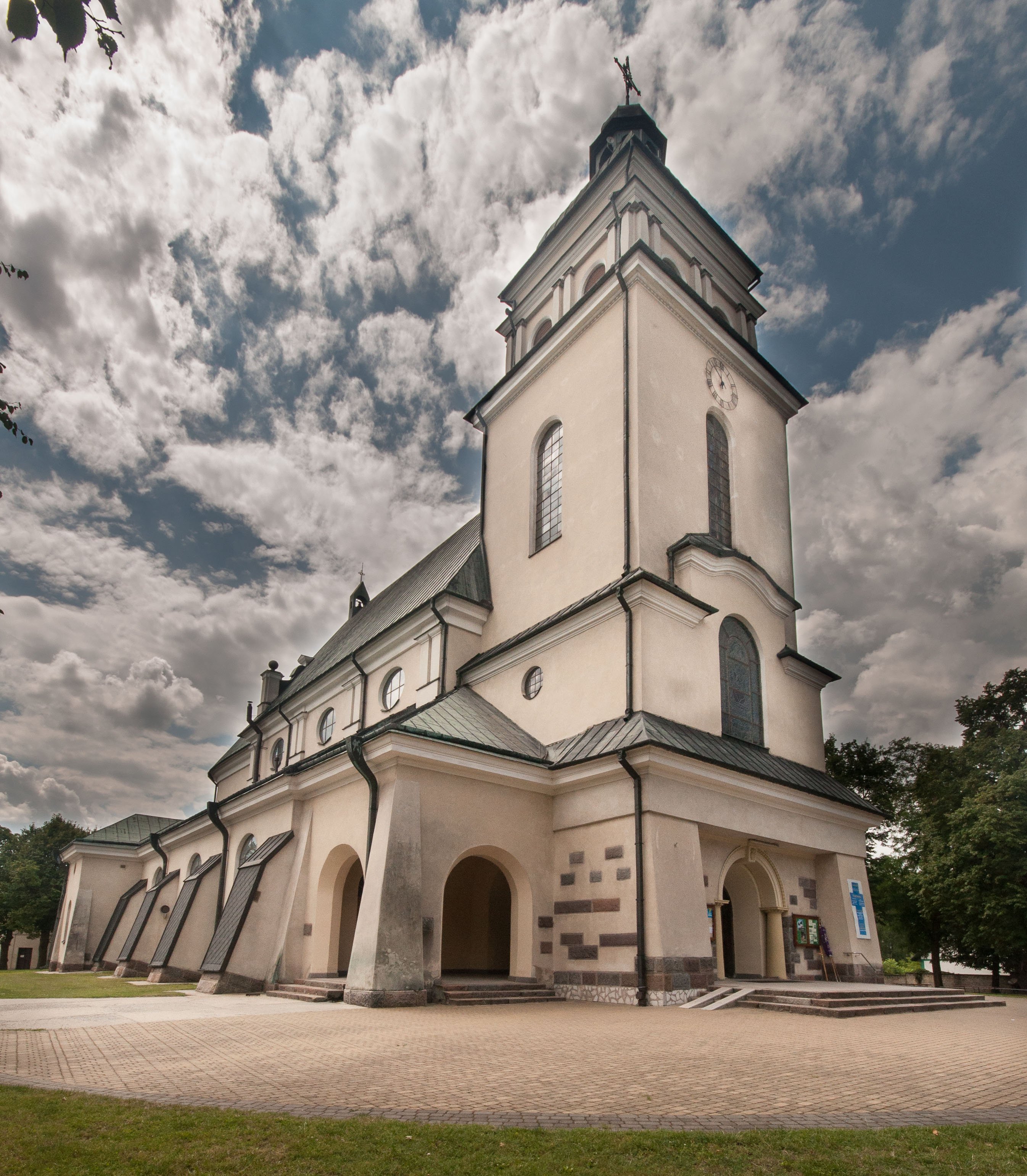
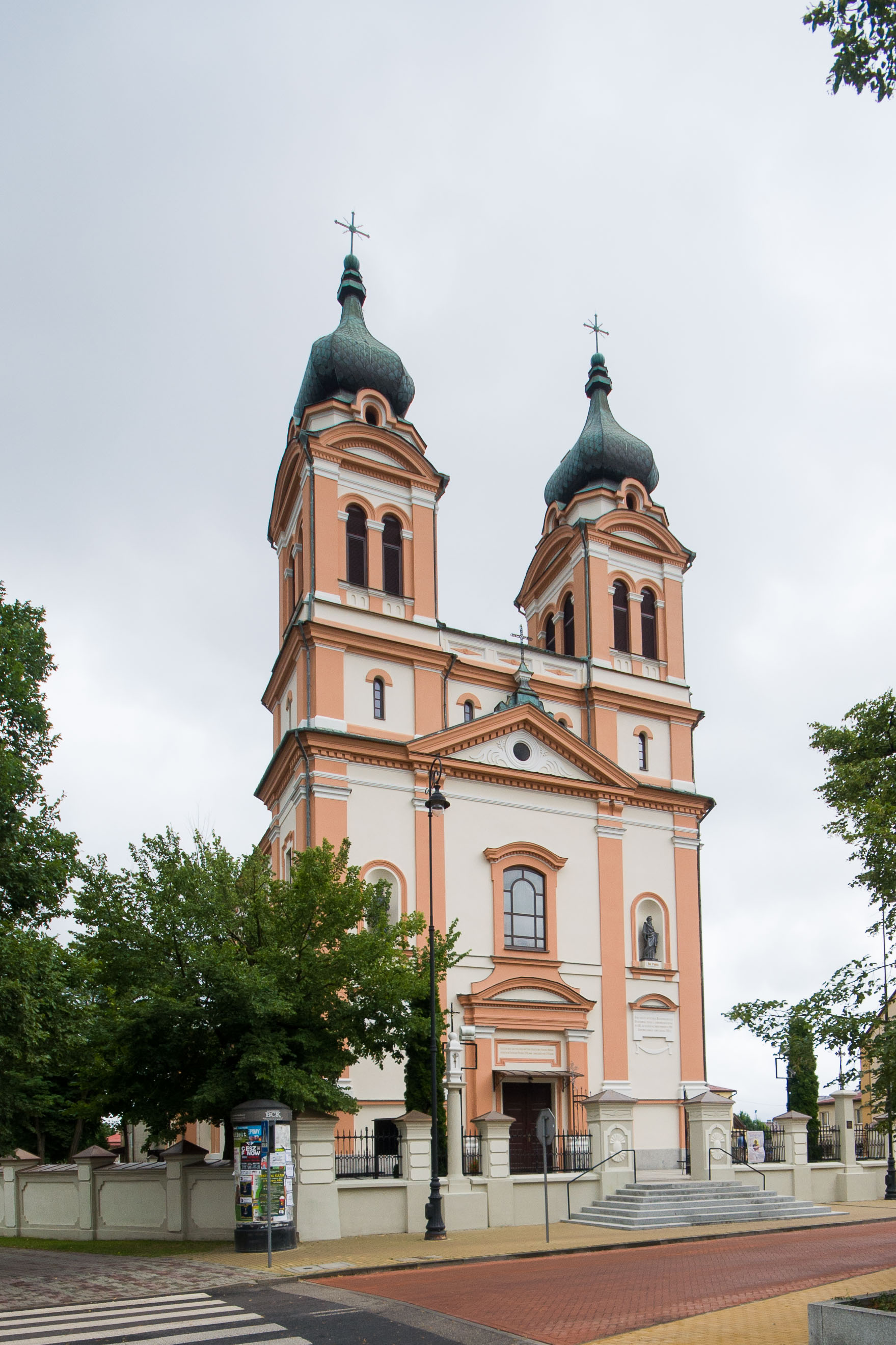
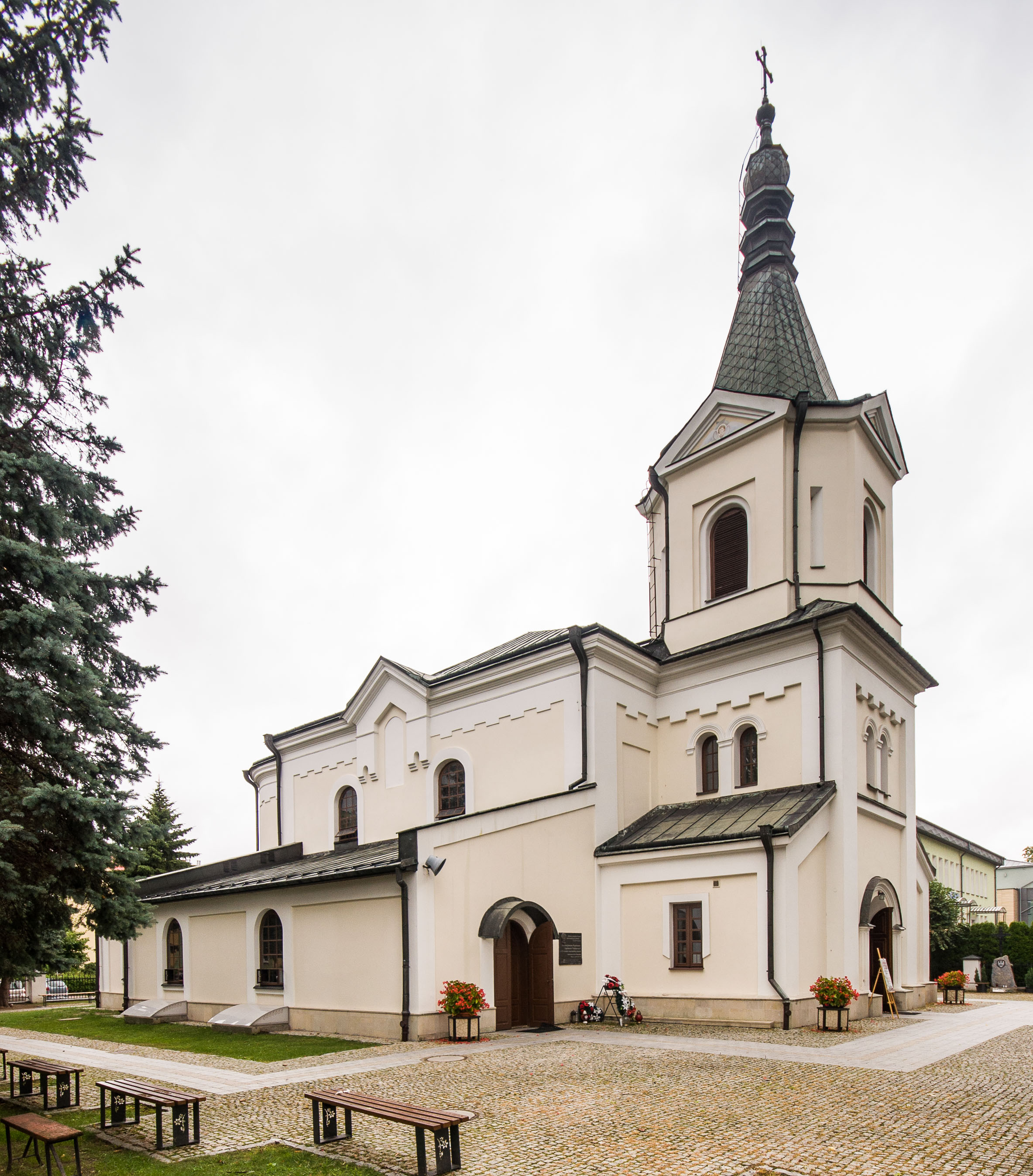
Historic churches: St. Mary Magdalene, Assumption, St. George
- Stanisław Nowakowski's Park – an old park in the town affectionately nicknamed Małpi Gaj (English: Monkey Marsh). It is a last relic of a Nowakowski's palace. The park was designed as a garden in the 17th century. The original gate to the town still stands there. The old garden keeper's cottage also survives to this day. The same cannot be said about the small villa which stood deep in the park, but now has been completely vandalised.
- Polish Baroque Church of the Assumption of Mary from the early 17th century. The building is located on Trzeciego Maja Street, next to Plac Wolności (Market Square).
- Church of the St. George on Tadeusz Kościuszko Street, not very large building from the 19th century, former Eastern Orthodox church.
- Mary Magdalene church in Puszcza Solska district. Built in the beginning of the 1920s, surrounded by monumental objects of franciscan monastery, small bell tower and Mary Magdalene Chapel (all from the 17th century).

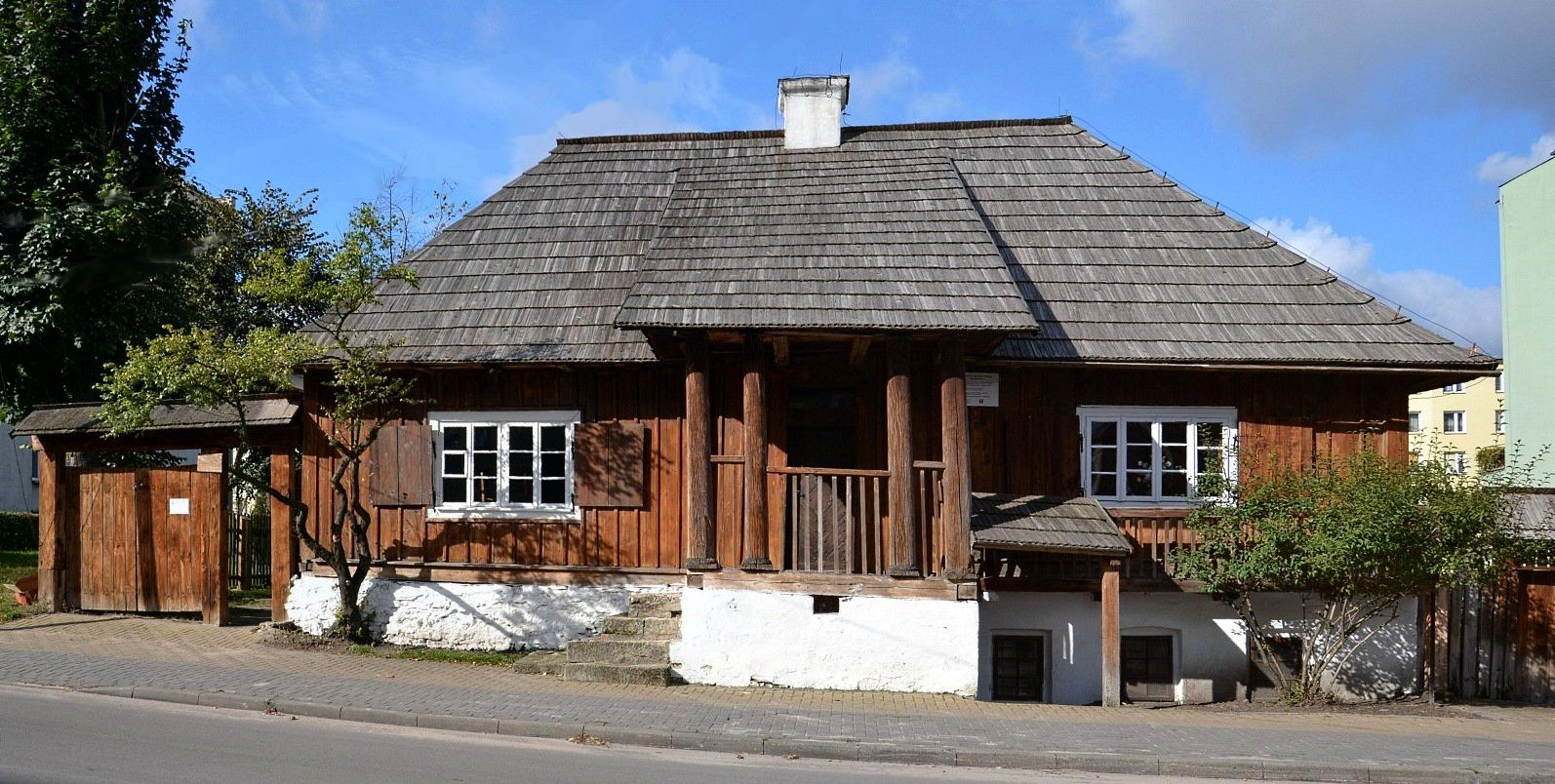
Zagroda Sitarska open-air museum

- Zagroda Sitarska museum – open-air museum on Nadstawna Street, built in the beginning of the 19th century. The main building is wooden home, with exhibition of traditional making sieves industry. All objects of museum are surrounded by neighbouring multi-family buildings.
- Replica of the 17th century wooden Wołpa Synagogue, built in Bilgoraj in 2015.

== Transport ==
Biłgoraj is located away from main Polish roads. It is a junction of two voivodeship roads - road nr. 835 (north–south, from Lublin to Przemyśl), and road nr. 858 (east–west, from Zamość to Nisko). Nearest national road nr. 74 (Zamość - Stalowa Wola) goes 17 kilometres (11 miles) north of the town. Biłgoraj has a rail station on a secondary-importance line from Zamość to Stalowa Wola, through the town also goes the Broad Gauge Metallurgy Line. Nearest airport, Rzeszów-Jasionka Airport, is located 110 km (68 mi) to the south.

== Industry ==
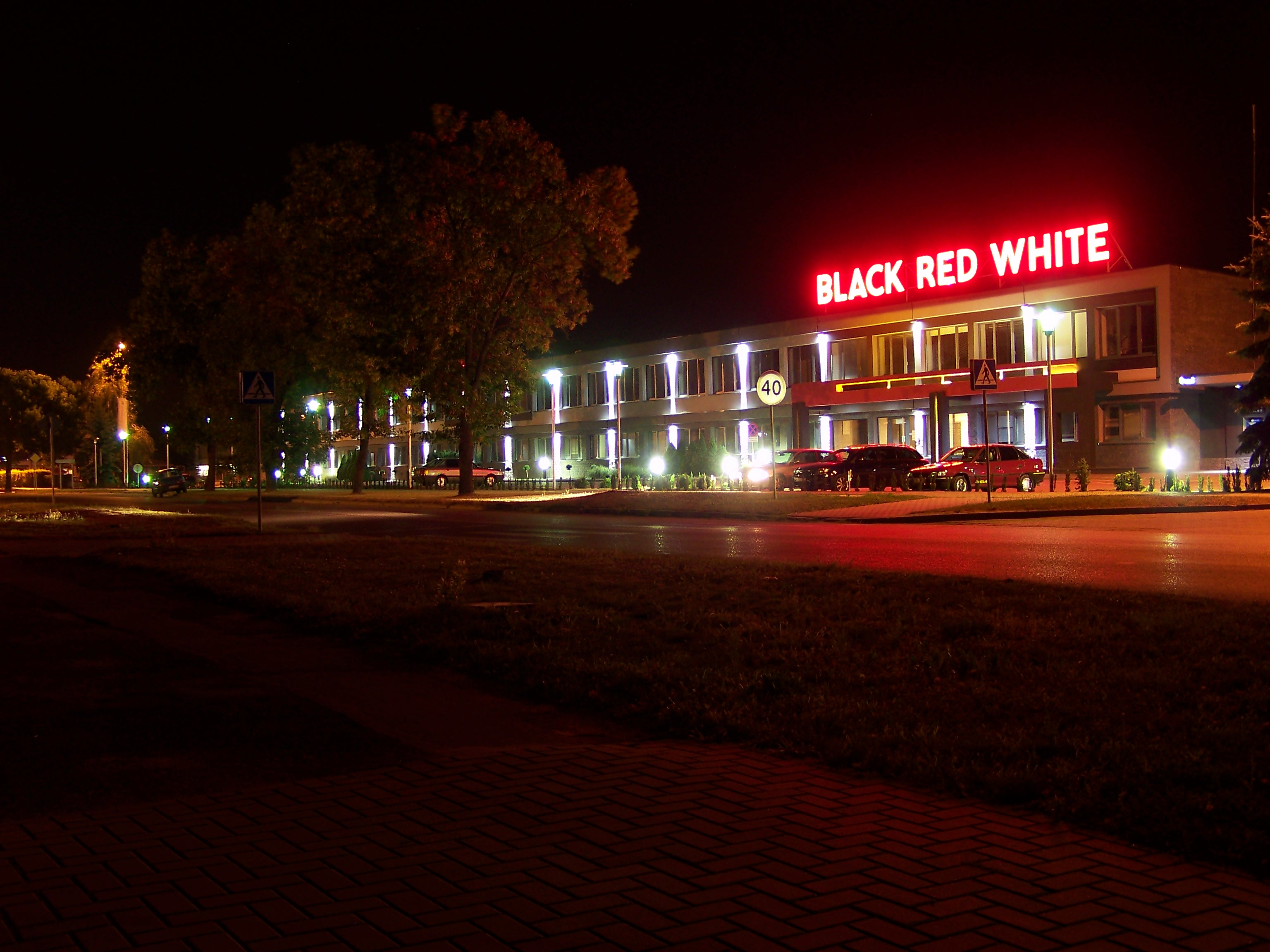
Headquarters of Black Red White, Krzeszowska Street

In Biłgoraj are located a headquarter and main factories of Black Red White, leading furniture manufacturer in Poland. The town is also known as a center of wine industry (Ambra company bottling plants are located in village Wola Duża, 4 kilometres (2 miles) east of the city), knitting (mainly thanks to Mewa factory) and production of cardboard packaging, wooden doors and windows.

== Local folklore ==
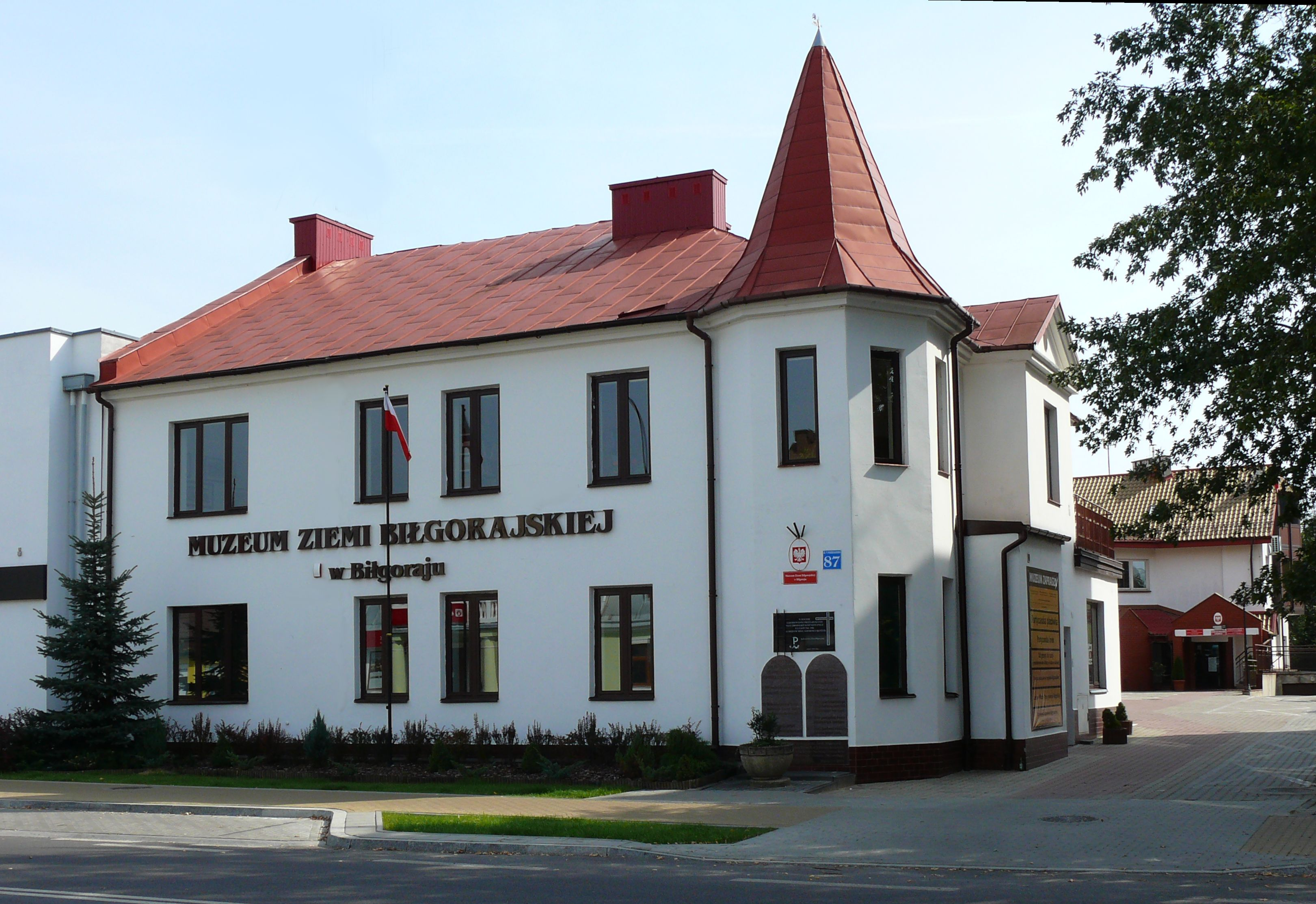
Regional Museum in Biłgoraj

Biłgoraj is an important center of local folklore, with highly developed folk art, regional clothes and customs. This is due to the town's location, among forests, where communication with other communities was limited. There are several “Biłgoraj-style” houses, and in the area numerous wayside shrines can be found. Biłgoraj's folklore was used by Grzegorz Ciechowski in his songs written as Grzegorz z Ciechowa. Until the 19th century, famous green Biłgoraj beer was produced in the town. Furthermore, for centuries Biłgoraj was a major national center of sieve makers. The town has a Regional Museum and an Open-air museum Zagroda Sitarska. Due to its proximity to Roztocze National Park, it is visited by a number of tourists. It also has a Baroque church of Holy Trinity (17th century) and 12 different monuments.

== Twin towns – sister cities ==
Biłgoraj is twinned with:

- Afula in Israel
- Bílina in Czech Republic
- Crailsheim in Germany
- Kelmė in Lithuania
- Stropkov in Slovakia
- Novovolynsk in Ukraine

Former twin towns:

- Kruhlaye in Belarus

Cooperation with Kruhlaye was ended due to Belarusian involvement in the 2022 Russian invasion of Ukraine.

== Notable residents ==
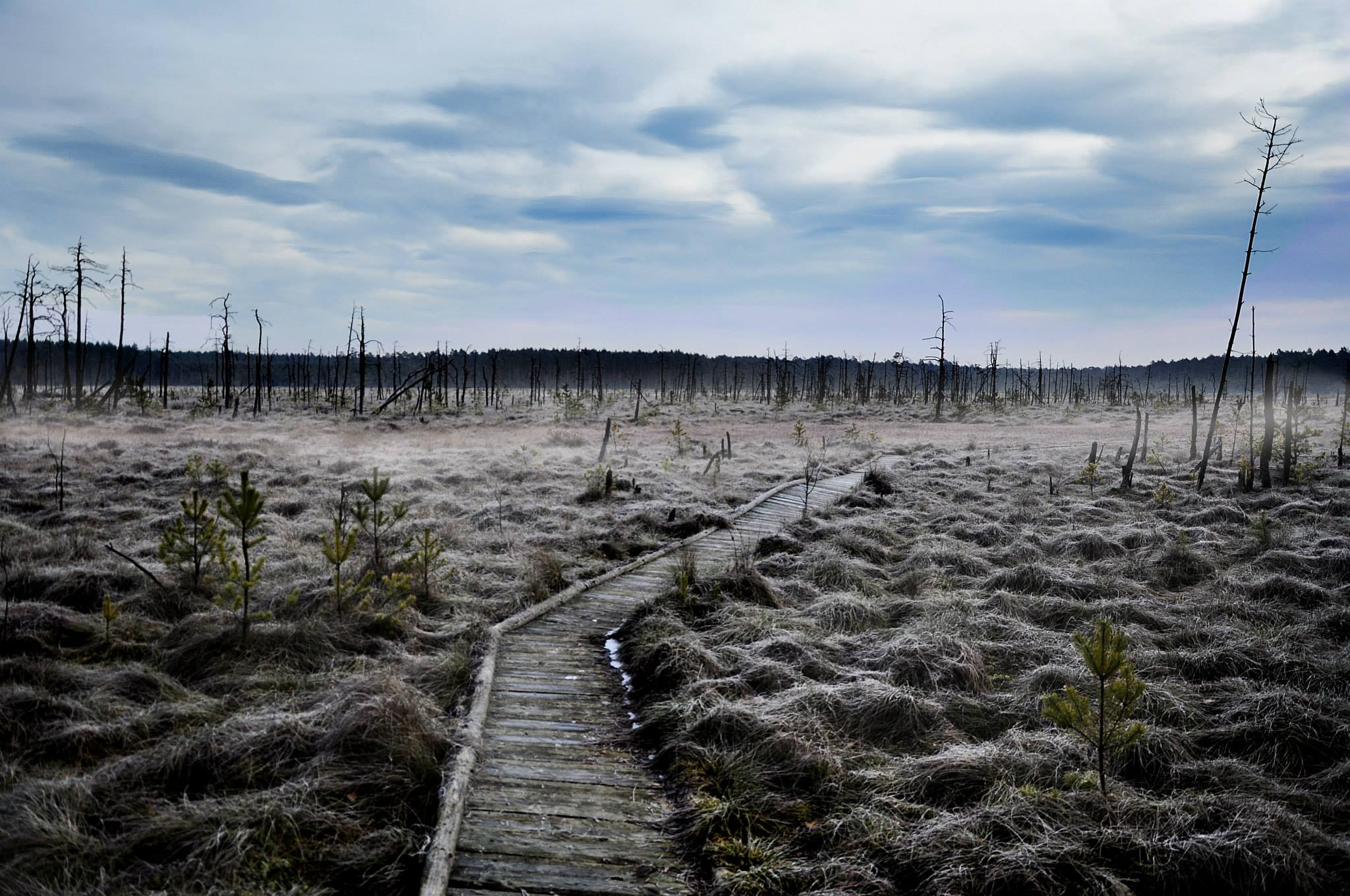
Obary Nature Reserve

- Yitzchak Huberman (May 18, 1896 – January 3, 1977) Hasidic rabbi, later known as "the Tzaddik of Ra'anana"
- Shmuel Atzmon-Wircer (born 1929), creator of Yiddishpiel Theatre in Israel
- Konrad Bartoszewski (1914–1987), writer, commander of a partisan unit during World War II
- Isaac Bashevis Singer (1903–1991), Jewish-American novelist and Nobel Prize winner who lived in Biłgoraj as a child. Biłgoraj and the surrounding villages are featured in many of his stories and novels
- Israel Joshua Singer (1893–1944), Polish-Jewish novelist and brother of Isaac Bashevis Singer
- Justyna Bąk (born 1974), former 3000 meters steeplechase world record holder
- Shmuel Ben-Artzi (1914–2011), Israeli writer, poet and educator, and the father in-law of the Israeli prime minister Benjamin Netanyahu
- Michał Chodara (born 1986), handball player
- Edward Drescher (1912–1977), physician, surgeon
- Joanna Kaczor (born 1984), volleyball player
- Marzena Karpińska (born 1988), weightlifter
- Harry Keitel, father of actor Harvey Keitel
- Chaya Strygler (Annie Shapiro)(born 1892), grandmother of composer and conductor Michael Jeffrey Shapiro
- Stefan Knapp (1921–1996), painter
- Janusz Palikot (born 1964), politician and businessman
- Mordechai Rokeach (1902–1949), known as Mordechai of Bilgoray, Rav of Biłgoraj before World War II
- Maria Śliwka (1935–1997), volleyball player
- Roman Tokarczyk (born 1942), lawyer, philosopher
- Kazimierz Węgrzyn (born 1967), footballer

== See also ==
- Biłgoraj pierogi - regional dish from Biłgoraj
