= Czernięcin Główny =

- Village
- Interactive map of Czernięcin Główny
- Location within Poland
- Coordinates: 50°48′N 22°48′E
- Country: Poland
- Voivodeship: Lublin
- County: Biłgoraj
- Gmina: Turobin

Population
  - Total: 638
- Time zone: UTC+1 (CET)
  - Summer (DST): UTC+2 (CEST)

Czernięcin Główny [t͡ʂɛrˈɲɛnt͡ɕin ˈɡwuvnɨ] is a village in the administrative district of Gmina Turobin, within Biłgoraj County, Lublin Voivodeship, in eastern Poland.

== History ==
Three Polish citizens were murdered by Nazi Germany in the village during World War II.
