= List of municipal flags of the Lublin Voivodeship =

The following list includes flags of municipalities (gminy) in the Lublin Voivodeship.

Flag of the Lublin Voivodeship

According to the definition, a flag is a sheet of fabric of a specific shape, colour and meaning, attached to a spar or mast. It may also include the coat of arms or emblem of the administrative unit concerned. In Poland, territorial units (municipal, city and county councils) may establish flags in accordance with the Act of 21 December 1978 on badges and uniforms”. In its original version, it only allowed territorial units to establish coats of arms. Despite that many cities and municipalities adopted resolutions and used a flag as their symbol. It was not until the Act of 29 December 1998 amending certain acts in connection with the implementation of the state system reform that the right of voivodeships, counties and municipalities to establish this symbol of a territorial unit was officially confirmed.

In 2025, 129 out of 213 municipalities in the Lublin Voivodeship had their own flag, and by 2023 the municipality of Chełm also had one. The flag of the voivodeship was established in 2004.

== List of municipal flags ==
=== City of Biała Podlaska ===
Flag	Description
	The city's flag was established on 11 September 1997. It is a rectangular flag with proportions of 5:8, divided into four horizontal stripes: silver, green, gold and red in the ratio of 2:1:1:2. In the central part of theflag the city's coat of arms is placed.

=== Biała County ===
Municipality	Flag	Description
Gmina Biała Podlaska		The municipality's flag was established on 15 February 1996. It is a rectangular flag with proportions of 5:8, divided into three horizontal stripes: white, black and red in the ratio of 2:1:2. The municipality's coat of arms may be located in the upper left corner of the patch.
Gmina Drelów		The municipal flag was established by Resolution No. XIV/86/96 of 27 June 1996. It is a rectangular flag with proportions of 5:8, divided into four equal vertical stripes: green, white, red and yellow.
City of Międzyrzec Podlaski		The city's flag, designed by Kamil Wójcikowski and Robert Fidura, was established by Resolution No. VI/51/19 of 29 March 2019. It is a rectangular flag with proportions of 5:8, divided into two horizontal stripes: white and blue in a ratio of 4:1. In the upper left corner of the flag the city's coat of arms is placed.
Gmina Międzyrzec Podlaski		The municipal flag is a rectangular flag with proportions of 5:8, divided into three horizontal equal stripes: silver, gold and blue. In the central part of the flag the municipal coat of arms may be displayed.
Gmina Sławatycze		The municipal flag, designed by Kamil Wójcikowski and Robert Fidury, was established by resolution nr VII/43/2015 of 11 October 2015. It is a rectangular flag with proportions of 5:8, yellow in colour, on the left side of the flag is the municipal coat of arms.
Gmina Terespol		The municipal flag was established by resolution nr XXI/138/12 of 28 December 2012. It is a rectangular flag with proportions of 5:8, divided into three horizontal strips: two white and one red in the ratio of 1:3:1. In the central part of the flag the municipal coat of arms is displayed.
Gmina Zalesie		The municipal flag was established by resolution nr XXII/168/98 of 10 June 1998. It is a rectangular flag, It is divided into three equal horizontal stripes: green, red and yellow. In the central part of the flag the municipal coat of arms is placed.

=== Biłgoraj County ===
Municipality	Flag	Description
Gmina Aleksandrów		The municipal flag was established by resolution nr XXII/125/13 of 28 June 2013. It is a rectangular flag, in the proportions of 5:8, divided into three horizontal strips: two yellow and one red in the ratio of 1:2:1. In the central part of the flag the municipal coat of arms is displayed.
City of Biłgoraj		The municipal flag was established on the 13 June 2001. It is a rectangular flag in the proportions of 2:3, divided into seven equal horizontal lines: four red and three white and three white. In the central part of the flag the municipal coat of arms is displayed
Gmina Biszcza		The municipal flag, designed by Henryk Seroka, it was established by resolution nr XII/64/2011 of 28 December 2011. It is a rectangular flag with proportions of 5:8, it is divided into two vertical parts: the left side ,red in colour, with the municipal coat of arms and the left side in yellow.
City of Goraj and gmina Goraj		The municipal flag was established by resolution nr XXXV/168/2002 of 29 June 2002. It is a rectangular flag with proportions of 5:8, divided into three horizontal strips: yellow, red and white in the ratio of 1:2:1.
Gmina Łukowa		The municipal flag, designed by Kamil Wójcikowski and Roberta Fidury, it was established by resolution nr X/89/2016 of 26 September 2016. It is a rectangular flag in the proportions of 5:8, divided into two vertical strips: the left side ,red in colour, with the municipal coat of arms displayed and the right one is white.
Gmina Obsza		The municipal flag, designed by Robert Szydlik, was established by resolution nr XV/97/16 of 11 November 2016. It is a rectangular flag in the proportions of 5:8, it is divided into three horizontal strips: two yellow and one red in the ratio of 2:1:2. In the central part of the flag the municipal coat of arms is displayed.
Gmina Tereszpol		The municipal flag, designed by Henryk Seroka, was established by resolution nr XXX/144/09 of 28 August 2009. It is a rectangular flag with proportions of 5:8, divided into three horizontal stripes: yellow, green and red in the ratio of 2:1:2. In the central part of the flag the municipal coat of arms is displayed.
City of Turobin and gmina Turobin		The municipal flag was established by resolution nr XXXIX/203/2013 of 19 November 2013. It is a rectangular flag with proportions of 5:8, red in colour, on the left side of the flag the emblem from the municipal coat of arms is displayed.

=== City of Chełm ===
Flag	Description
	The city flag is a rectangular flag, divided into two horizontal stripes: white and green. In the upper part of the flag the city coat of arms is displayed.

=== Chełm County ===
Municipality	Flag	Description
Gmina Kamień		The municipal flag is a rectangular flag divided into two equal horizontal stripes: white and red, with a yellow wedge on the left side of the flag .
Gmina Rejowiec Fabryczny		The municipal flag, designed by Dariusz Dessauer, was established by resolution nr XVII/99/96 of 9 February 1996. It is a rectangular flag with proportions of 5:8, divided into four equal vertical stripes: gold, blue, silver and red. On the left side of the flag the municipal coat of arms may be displayed.
Gmina Sawin		The municipal flag was established by resolution nr XX/128/2000 of 24 March 2000. It is a rectangular flag with proportions of 5:8, divided into four parts by a chequered pattern: two red and two yellow (the canton is red). In the central part of the flag the municipal coat of arms is displayed.
Gmina Wierzbica		The municipal flag was established by resolution nr XXIII-143/2001 of 29 June 2001. It is a rectangular flag with proportions of 5:8, divided into three vertical strips: two blue and yellow. In the central part of the flag the municipal coat of arms is displayed.

=== Hrubieszów County ===
Municipality	Flag	Description
Gmina Dołhobyczów		The municipal flag, designed by Robert Szydlik, was established by resolution nr XIII/102/2012 of 31 May 2012. It is a rectangular flag with proportions of 5:8, red in colour, with a silver wavy line at the bottom. In the upper left corner of the flag the municipal coat of arms is displayed.
City of Hrubieszów		The city flag is a rectangular flag with the proportions of 5:8, divided diagonally into two equal parts: red and green. In the upper left corner of the flag is the city coat of arms, under it is the number "1400”.
Gmina Mircze		The municipal flag was established by resolution nr XVIII/95/99 of 30 December1999. It is a rectangular flag with proportions of 5:8, divided into three horizontal strips: white, red and yellow in the ratio of 2:1:2. In the central part of the flag the municipal coat of arms is displayed.
Gmina Trzeszczany		The municipal flag, designed by Robert Szydlik, was established by resolution nr XVII/128/2016 of 22 September 2016. It is a rectangular flag with proportions of 5:8, blue in colour, on the left side of which the emblem from the municipality's coat of arms was placed.
Gmina Werbkowice		The municipal flag, designed by Henryk Seroka, was established by resolution nr IX/65/2011 of 9 July 2011. It is a rectangular flag with proportions of 5:8, divided into three horizontal strips: two red and one yellow in the ratio of 1:2:1. In the central part of the flag the municipal coat of arms is displayed.

=== Janów County ===
Municipality	Flag	Description
Gmina Batorz		The municipal flag, designed by Robert Szydlik, została was established by resolution nr XII/96/2016 of 12 February 2016. It is a rectangular flag with the proportions of 5:8, divided into three vertical strips: white, red and yellow in the ratio of 1:3:1. In the central part of the flag is the municipal coat of arms.
Gmina Dzwola		The municipal flag, designed by Robert Szydlik, została was established by resolution nr XXIX/212/2018 of 19 March 2018. It is a rectangular flag with the proportions of 5:8, divided into three vertical strips: two yellow and one red in the ratio of 1:3:1. In the central part of the flag the municipal coat of arms is displayed.
Gmina Godziszów		The municipal flag, designed by Robert Szydlik, was established by resolution nr XXVII/174/2013 of 28 November 2013. It is a rectangular flag with the proportions of 5:8, red in colour, in the central part of the flag the municipal coat of arms is displayed.
City and gmina Janów Lubelski		The municipal flag, designed by Henryk Seroka, was established by resolution nr LV/481/23 of 20 January 2023. It is a rectangular flag with proportions of 5:8, divided into three horizontal strips: two blue and one white (referring to the Biała River) in the ratio of 10:1:1. Above the white strip the municipal coat of arms is displayed.
City and gmina Modliborzyce		The municipal flag was established by resolution nr XXXV/198/2017 of 27 June 2017. It is a rectangular flag with proportions of 5:8, divided into three horizontal strips: two red and one white in the ratio of 1:3:1. In the central part of the flag the municipal coat of arms is displayed.
Gmina Potok Wielki		The municipal flag, designed by Robert Szydlik, was established by resolution nr XXXIII/234/2018 of 22 May 2018. It is a rectangular flag with proportions of 5:8, divided vertically into two equal parts: left side, white in colour, displaying the municipal coat of arms and the right side in red.

=== Krasnystaw County ===
Municipality	Flag	Description
Gmina Fajsławice		The municipality's flag was established by Resolution No. VII/34/2003 of 30 April 2003. It is a rectangular piece of fabric with proportions of 5:8, divided into four horizontal stripes: red, white, black and red in a ratio of 1:2:2:1. The municipality's coat of arms may be placed in its central part.
City of Krasnystaw		The city flag was established by resolution nr XXI/143/2000 of 23 March 2000. It is a rectangular flag in the proportions of 5:8, yellow in colour, in the central part of which the city coat of arms is displayed.
Gmina Krasnystaw		The municipal flag was established by resolution nr X/73/2003 of 28 October 2003. It is a rectangular flag in the proportions of 5:8, green in colour, in the central part of which the municipal coat of arms is displayed.
Gmina Łopiennik Górny		The municipal flag was established by resolution nr XXV/120/97 of 10 August 1997. It is a rectangular flag in the proportions of 5:8, divided into four equal horizontal parts: green, white, yellow and red. In the central part of the flag the municipal coat of arms is displayed.

=== Kraśnik County ===
Municipality	Flag	Description
City of Annopol and gmina Annopol		The municipal flag, designed by Piotr Dymmel and Dariusz Dessauera, was established by resolution nr XXXVIII/198/2002 of 28 June 2002. It is a rectangular flag in the proportions of 5:8, divided into three horizontal strips: white, green and yellow in the ratio of 2:1:2.
Gmina Dzierzkowice		The municipal flag, designed by Krzysztof Skupieński, was established by resolution nr XXIII/152/2005 of 29 September 2005. It is a rectangular flag in the proportions of 5:8, green in colour, in the centre of the flag the municipal coat of arms is displayed.
City of Kraśnik		The city flag was established by resolution nr XI/71/2015 of 25 June 2015. It is a rectangular flag, divided into three wedges: one red and two yellow. On the left side of the flag the city coat of arms is displayed.
Gmina Kraśnik		The municipal flag was established by resolution nr XLIII/191/2006 of 26 October 2006. It is a rectangular flag with proportions of 5:8, divided into three vertical strips: two blue and one white in the ratio of 1:3:1. In the central part of the flag the municipal coat of arms is displayed.
Gmina Szastarka		The municipal flag, designed by Henryk Seroka and priest Pawła Dudzińskiego, was established by resolution nr LXIX/245/2010 of 10 November 2010. It is a rectangular flag with proportions of 5:8, green in colour, in the centre of which the municipal coat of arms is displayed.
Gmina Trzydnik Duży		The municipal flag, designed by Henryk Seroka, It is a rectangular flag with proportions of 5:8, divided into three horizontal strips: two red and one yellow in the ratio of 1:3:1. In the centre of the flag the municipal coat of arms is displayed.
City and gmina Urzędów		The municipal flag, designed by Piotr Dymmel and Dariusz Dessauer, was established by resolution nr XXII-149/2004 of 29 October 2004. It is a rectangular flag with proportions of 5:8, divided into two equal horizontal parts: left ,red in colour, displaying the emblem from the municipality's coat of arms and the right in green.
Gmina Wilkołaz		The municipal flag, designed by Henryk Seroka, was established by resolution nr XII/67/2015 of 20 November 2015. It is a rectangular flag with proportions of 5:8, green in colour, in the centre of the flag the emblem from the municipal coat of arms is displayed.
Gmina Zakrzówek		The municipal flag, designed by Kamil Wójcikowski and Robert Fidury, was established by resolution nr XLV/275/2014 of 30 July 2014. It is a rectangular flag with proportions of 5:8, blue in colour, in the left side of the flag the emblem from the municipal coat of arms is displayed.

=== Lubartów County ===
Municipality	Flag	Descriptions
Gmina Abramów		The municipal flag, designed by Henryk Seroka, established by resolution nr XLV/207/2018 of 17 August 2018. It is a rectangular flag with proportions of 5:8, divided into equal vertical strips: left one is white in colour with the emblem from the municipal coat of arms and the right one is blue in colour.
City and gmina Kamionka		The municipal flag, designed by Henryk Seroka, established by resolution nr XXXI/209/2021 of 30 November 2021. It is a rectangular flag with proportions of 5:8, divided into seven equal horizontal strips: four red and three white. In the central part of the flag the municipal coat of arms is displayed.
City of Lubartów		The city flag was established by resolution nr XII/188/04 of 27 August 2004. It is a rectangular flag with proportions of 5:8, divided into two equal horizontal strips: red and blue.
Gmina Lubartów		The municipal flag is a rectangular flag with proportions of 5:8, divided into three horizontal strips: green, yellow and red in the ratio of 2:1:2. The municipal coat of arms may be displayed in the centre of the flag.
Gmina Niedźwiada		The municipal flag is a rectangular flag with proportions of 5:8, divided into three horizontal strips: white, green and red in the ratio of 2:1:2. In the central part of the flag the municipal coat of arms is displayed.
Gmina Ostrówek		The municipal flag was established by resolution nr XXVIII/146/09 of 30 December 2009. It is a rectangular flag with proportions of 5:8, divided into three horizontal strips: green, white and red in the ratio of 1:3:1. In the central part of the flag the municipal coat of arms is displayed.
Gmina Serniki		The municipal flag was established by resolution nr XLIV/250/2013 of 30 December 2013. It is a rectangular flag with proportions of 5:8, divided into four vertical strips: two white and three blue in the ratio of 1:1:8:1:1. In the central part of the flag the emblem from the municipal coat of arms is displayed.
Gmina Uścimów		The municipal flag, designed by Kamil Wójcikowski and Robert Fidura, was established by resolution nr XIX/120/2020 of 23 June 2020. It is a rectangular flag with proportions of 5:8, Divided into two equal vertical part: the left side, blue in colour, has the emblem from the municipal coat of arms, the right side is divided into seven equal horizontal strips: blue, yel;ow, white, blue, yellowand white.

=== City of Lublin ===
Flag	Description
	The first version of the city flag was established on 31 May 1989., the current version of the city flag was established by resolution nr 465/XXI/2004 of 8 February 2004. It is a rectangular flag in the resolution of 5:8, divided into three horizontal strips: white, green and red in the ratio of 2:1:2. In the official version has Lublin's coat of arms in the central part of the flag.

=== Lublin County ===
Municipality	Flag	Description
City and gmina Bełżyce		The municipal flag, designed by Kamil Wójcikowski and Robert Fidura, was established by resolution nr XIX/101/2016 of 17 March 2016. It is a rectangular flag with proportions of 5:8, blue in colour, on the left side of which the emblem from the municipal coat of arms is displayed.
City and gmina Bychawa		The municipal flag was established by resolution nr XLIII/290/2014 of 26 June 2014. It is a rectangular flag with proportions of 5:8, blue in colour, in the central part of the flag the emblem from the municipal coat of arms is displayed.
Gmina Garbów		The municipal flag, designed by Henryk Seroka, was established by resolution nr XXIII/10/154/93 of 23 April 1993. It is a rectangular flag with proportions of 5:8, divided into two equal horizontal strips: gold and red. In the upper part of the flag the municipal coat of arms may be displayed.
Gmina Głusk		The municipal flag is a rectangular flag with proportions of 5:8, divided into two equal horizontal stripes: red and green, with a white wedge on the right-hand side of the panel.
Gmina Jabłonna		The municipal flag was established by resolution nr XXVIII/195/2009 of 29 December2009. It is a rectangular flag with proportions of 5:8, divided into three horizontal strips: yellow, white and green in the ratio of 1:3:1. In the central part of the flag the municipal coat of arms is displayed.
Gmina Jastków		The municipal flag, designed by Wojciech Tutak, was established by resolution nr XXX/220/2017 of 17 February 2017. It is a rectangular flag with proportions of 5:8, divided into five horizontal strips: two white and three red in the ratio of 1:1:12:1:1. On the left side of the flag the emblem from the municipal coat of arms is displayed.
Gmina Niedrzwica Duża		The municipal flag was established by resolution nr XXVIII/214/97 of 29 December 1997. It is a rectangular flag with proportions of 5:8, divided into three equal vertical strips: two red and one white. In the central part of the flag the municipal coat of arms is displayed.
Gmina Niemce		The municipal flag was established by resolution nr LIV/592/06 of 28 September 2006. It is a rectangular flag with proportions of 5:8, divided into three equal vertical strips: blue, white and red. In the central part of the flag the municipal coat of arms is displayed.
Gmina Strzyżewice		The first version of the municipal flag was established by resolution nr XXXIII/206/05 of 12 April 2005, the current version of the municipal flag was established by resolution nr XLIII/235/2022 of 9 September 2022. It is a rectangular flag with proportions of 5:8, divided into three vertical flags: two green and one yellow in the ratio of 1:3:1. In the central part of the flag the municipal coat of arms is displayed.
Gmina Wojciechów		The municipal flag, designed by Wojciech Tutak and Paweł Dudziński, was established by resolution nr XXXVIII/170/14 of 24 April 2014. It is a rectangular flag with proportions of 5:8, red in colour, on the left side of the flag the emblem from the municipal coat of arms.
Gmina Wysokie		The municipal flag, designed by Henryk Seroka, was established by resolution nr XX/139/2017 of 30 January 2017. It is a rectangular flag with proportions of 5:8, divided into two equal vertical strips: on the left side, white in colour, has the emblem from the municipal coat of arms and the right side is red in colour.

=== Łęczyna County ===
Municipality	Flag	Description
Gmina Cyców		The municipal flag was established by resolution nr IX/73/15 of 30 December 2015. It is a rectangular flag with proportions of 5:8, red in colour, in the centre of the flag the emblem from the municipal coat of arms is displayed.
Gmina Ludwin		The municipal flag is a rectangular flag, divided into four horizontal strips: blue, yellow, white and blue in the ratio of 1:2:2:1. In the central part of the flag the municipal coat of arms is displayed.
City and gmina Łęczna		The municipal flag was established by resolution nr XXIII/181/96 of 28 February 1996. It is a rectangular flag with proportions of 5:8, divided into three horizontal strips: black, silver and red in the ratio of 4:1:4. In the central part of the upper stripe the municipal coat of arms can be displayed.
Gmina Milejów		The municipal flag, designed by Walery Pisarek, was established by resolution nr XVII/107/04 of 22 June 2004. It is a rectangular flag with proportions of 5:8, divided into two equal vertical strips: red and blue. In the central part of the flag the municipal coat of arms is displayed.

=== Łuków County ===
Municipality	Flag	Description
Gmina Adamów		The municipal flag was established by resolution nr XXII/144/13 of 4 March 2013. It is a rectangular flag 5:8, divided into three horizontal strips: red, yellow and black in the ratio of 1:6:1. in the central part of the flag the emblem from the municipal coat of arms is displayed.
Gmina Krzywda		The municipal flag, designed by Paweł Dudziński, was established by resolution nr VII/43/2011 of 28 June 2011. It is a rectangular flag with proportions of 5:8, divided into three horizontal strips: two blue and one white in the ratio 1:3:1. In the central part of the flag the municipal coat of arms is displayed.
City of Łuków		The city flag, designed by Henryk Seroka, was established by resolution nr LVI/405/2018 of 18 September 2018. It is a rectangular flag with proportions of 5:8, divided into three horizontal strips: two red and one yellow in the ratio of 8:1:1 (the yellow strip may symbolise the river Krzna). In the central part of the flag the emblem from the municipal coat of arms is displayed.
Gmina Stanin		The municipal flag was established by resolution nr XIII/86/08 of 29 February 2008. It is a rectangular flag with proportions of 5:8, divided into three vertical strips: two green and one red in the ratio of 1:3:1. In the central part of the flag the emblem from the municipal coat of arms is displayed.
City of Stoczek Łukowski		The first version of the city flag was established by resolution 9 June 1995, the current flag was established by resolution nr XXVI/168/2021 of 29 April 2021. It is a rectangular flag with proportions of 5:8, podzielony na dwa równe poziome divided into two equal horizontal strips: white and blue. In the central part of the upper strip the city coat of arms is displayed.
Gmina Wojcieszków		The municipal flag was established by resolution nr XV/82/04 of 19 May 2004. It is a rectangular flag with proportions of 5:8, divided into three vertical strips: white, yellow and red in the ratio of 7:2:7. On the elft side of the flag the emblem from the municipal coat of arms is displayed.
Gmina Wola Mysłowska		The municipal flag was established by resolution nr XI/60/2011 of 28 December 2011. It is a rectangular flag with proportions of 5:8, red in colour, on the left side of the flag the emblem from the municipal coat of arms is displayed.

=== Opole County ===
Municipality	Flag	Description
City of Józefów nad Wisłą and gmina Józefów nad Wisłą		The municipal flag was established on 25 March 1997. It is a rectangular flag with proportions of 5:8, divided into three equal horizontal strips: gold, silver and blue. In the central part of the flag the municipal coat of arms may be displayed.
Gmina Karczmiska		The municipal flag, designed by Henryk Seroka and Paweł Dudziński, was established in the year 2000. It is a rectangular flag with proportions of 5:8, divided into four equal horizontal strips: yellow, red, white and green.
Gmina Łaziska		The municipal flag was established by resolution nr XXI/117/09 of 27 March 2009. It is a rectangular flag with proportions of 5:8, divided into two equal parts: left side is red in colour, with the emblem of the municipal coat of arms and the right side is yellow in colour.
Gmina Wilków		The municipal flag, designed by Henryk Seroka, was established by resolution nr XVII/52/2011 of 21 November 2011. It is a rectangular flag with proportions of 5:8, it is divided into seven equal horizontal strips: four green and three white. In the central part of the flag the municipal coat of arms is displayed.

=== Parczew County ===
Municipality	Flag	Description
Gmina Dębowa Kłoda		The municipal flag is a rectangular flag with proportions of 5:8, divided into four equal horizontal strips: white, green, yellow and red. On the white strip of the flag themunicipal coat of arms may be displayed.
Gmina Jabłoń		The municipal flag was established by resolution nr XXXII/162/97 of 15 December 1997. It is a rectangular flag with proportions of 5:8, divided into three equal horizontal strips: yellow, red and white.
Gmina Milanów		The municipal flag was established by resolution nr XXIII/113/97 of 27 June 1997. It is a rectangular flag with proportions of 5:8, divided into three equal horizontal strips: white, yellow and red. In the central part of the flag the municipal coat of arms is displayed
City of Parczew gmina Parczew		The municipal flag, designed by Henryk Seroka, was established by resolution nr XXXV/253/2017 of 29 May 2017. It is a rectangular flag with proportions of 5:8, divided into three horizontal stripes: two red and one yellow in the ratio of 8:1:1. In the central part of the flag the emblem from the municipal coat of arms is displayed.
Gmina Podedwórze		The municipal flag is a rectangular flag with proportions of 5:8, divided into four equal horizontal strips: Two red and white. In the central part of the flag the municipal coat of arms may be displayed.
Gmina Siemień		The municipal flag was established by resolution nr IX/68/95 of 24 August 1995. It is a rectangular flag with proportions of 5:8, divided into two horizontal strips: red and yellow. In the upper stripe the municipal coat of arms may be displayed.

=== Puławy County ===
Municipality	Flag	Description
Gmina Baranów		The municipal flag was established by resolution nr XXXV/299/2009 of 16 April 2009. It is a rectangular flag with proportions of 5:8, divided into two equal parts: The left is red in colour, with the emblem from the municipal coat of arms being displayed, the right side is divided into five equal horizontal strips: three yellow and two red.
Gmina Janowiec		The municipal flag was established by resolution nr XXVII/154/2013 of 20 June 2013. It is a rectangular flag with proportions of 5:8, it is divided into 8 equal horizontal strips: four red and white. In the central part of the flag the municipal coat of arms is displayed.
City of Kazimierz Dolny and gmina Kazimierz Dolny		The municipal flag has been used since 1997. It is a rectangular flag with proportions of 5:8, divided into four horizontal strips: blue, red, white, yellow and blue in the ratio of 3:1:1:1:3. In the central part of the flag the municipal coat of arms is displayed.
City of Końskowola and gmina Końskowola		The municipal flag was established on 14 April 1995. It is a rectangular flag with proportions of 5:8, divided into three horizontal strips: silver, orange and blue in the ratio of 1:2:1. In the central part of the flag the munnicipal coat of arms may be displayed.
City of Kurów and gmina Kurów		The municipal flag was established by resolution nr XXII/215/2021 of 21 April 2021. It is a rectangular flag with proportions of 5:8, dark blue in colour, in the central part of the flag the municipal coat of arms is displayed.
Gmina Markuszów		The municipal flag was established by resolution nr XI/77/96 of 15 February 1996. It is a rectangular flag with proportions of 5:8, divided into two equal horizontal strips: gold and blue . In the central part of the flag the municipal coat of arms is displayed.
City of Nałęczów and gmina Nałęczów		The municipal flag is a rectangular flag with proportions of 7:13, divided into three horizontal strips: blue, white and red in the ratio of 1:2:1. In the central part of the flag the municipal coat of arms is displayed.
City of Puławy		The city flag was established by resolution nr XLVII/463/10 of 25 March 2010. It is a rectangular flag with proportions of 5:8, divided into four strips: silver, red, gold and blue in the ratio of 2:1:1:2. In the centre of the flag the city coat of arms may be displayed.
Gmina Puławy		The municipal flag, designed by Pawał Dudziński, was established by resolution nr XXI/120/2013 of 17 January 2013. It is a rectangular flag with proportions of 5:8, divided into three horizontal strips: two red and one white in the ratio of 1:6:1. In the central part of the municipal coat of arrms is displayed.
Gmina Żyrzyn		The municipal flag was established by resolution nr X/67/2016 of 29 January 2016. It is a rectangular flag with proportions of 5:8, divided into three horizontal strips: red, white and blue in the ratio of 3:1:1. On the left sie of the upper stripe the emblem from the municipal coat of arms is displayed.

=== Radzyń County ===
Municipality	Flag	Description
Gmina Borki		The municipal flag, designed by priest Pawła Dudzińskiego, it was established by resolution nr XVII/98/2012 of 20 June 2012. It is a rectangular flag with proportions of 5:8, divided into two equal parts: the left side, red in colour, displaying the emblem from the municipal coat of arms. The right side is divided into seven equal horizontal strips: four red, two yellow and one white.
City of Czemierniki and gmina Czemierniki		The municipal flag was established by resolution nr XXXIX/177/97 of 7 August 1997. It is a rectangular flag with proportions of 5:8, divided into four equal horizontal strips: white, green, yellowand blue. In the central part of the flag the municipal coat of arms may be displayed.
Gmina Kąkolewnica		The municipal flag was established by resolution nr VII/52/2011 of 25 August 2011. It is a rectangular flag with proportions of 3:6, blue in colour, in the central part of the flag the emblem from the municipal coat is arms is displayed.
Gmina Radzyń Podlaski		The municipal flag, designed by Robert Szydlik, it was established by resolution nr XII/63/2015 of 16 September 2015. It is a rectangular flag with proportions of 5:8, divided into four vertical strips: red, white, red, yellow and red in the ratio of 1:1:4:1:1. In the central part of flag the emblem from the municipal coat of arms is displayed.
Gmina Ulan-Majorat		The municipal flag, designed by Henryk Seroka, it was established by resolution nr XXXI/155/10 of 19 April 2010. It is a rectangular flag with proportions of 5:8, red in colour, in the central part of the flag the emblem from the municipal coat of arms is displayed.

=== Ryki County ===
Municipality	Flag	Description
City of Dęblin		The city flag, designed by Dariusz Dessauer, it was established by resolution nr XXXVIII/218/93 of 2 March 1993. It is a rectangular flag with proportions of 5:8, divided into three horizontal strips: silver, gold and blue in the ratio of 2:1:2. In the centre of the flag the city coat of arms may be displayed.
Gmina Kłoczew		The municipal flag was established by resolution nr XXIV/175/2016 of 22 July 2016. It is a rectangular flag with proportions of 5:8, white in colour, underneath the emblem from the municipal coat of arms are two horizontal strips.
Gmina Nowodwór		The municipal flag was established by resolution nr V/19/2015 of 27 February 2015. It is a rectangular flag with proportions of 5:8, red in colour, in the centre of the flag the emblem from the municipal coat of arms is displayed.
Gmina Stężyca		The municipal flag was established by nr XLIV/256/2006 of 11 October 2006. It is a rectangular flag with proportions of 5:8, red in colour, with the emblem from the municipality's coat of arms (together with a green field) placed in its centre.
Gmina Ułęż		It is a rectangular flag with proportions of 5:8, red in colour, in the centre of which the emblem from the municipal coat of arms.

=== Świdnik County ===
Municipality	Flag	Description
Gmina Mełgiew		The municipal flag was established in 1993. It is a rectangular flag with proportions of 5:8, divided into three vertical strips: silver, blue and red. In the central part of the flag the municipal coat of arms is displayed.
City of Świdnik		The city flag, designed by Dariusz Dessauer, it was established by 18 March 1993. It is a rectangular flag with proportions of 5:8, divided into three horizontal strips: grey, red and white in the ratio of 1:1:2. In the upper part of the flag the city coat of arms is displayed.
Gmina Trawniki		It is a rectangular flag with proportions of 5:8, divided by two gold and silver bars into four fields: blue at the top, green at the bottom, and two red fields on the sides.

=== Tomaszów County ===
Gmina	Wzór	Opis
Gmina Bełżec		The municipal flag, designed by Henryk Seroka and Paweł Dudziński, was established by nr XVI/85/12 of 28 June 2012. It is a rectangular flag with proportions of 5:8, divided into five vertical strips: three red and two yellow in the ratio of 1:1:4:1:1. In the central part of the flag the emblem from the municipal coat of arms is displayed.
Gmina Jarczów		The municipal flag, designed by Henryk Seroka and Tadeusz Sobieszek, it was established by resolution nr XX/151/21 of 30 April 2021. It is a rectangular flag with proportions of 5:8, divided into three horizontal strips: gold, yellow and red in the ratio of 1:3:1. In the central part of the flag the municipal coat of arms is displayed.
City of Lubycza Królewska and gmina Lubycza Królewska		The municipal flag, designed by Włodzimierz Chorążki, was established by resolution nr XXX/232/2010 of 24 March 2010. It is a rectangular flag with proportions of 5:8, divided into three horizontal strips: two red and one red in the ratio of 1:3:1. In the central part of the flag the municipal coat of arms is placed.
City of Łaszczów and gmina Łaszczów		The municipal flag, designed by Henryk Seroka, was established by resolution nr VII/43/11 of 17 June 2011. It is a rectangular flag with proportions of 5:8, divided into three horizontal strips: two red and one yellow in the ratio 1:2:1. In the central part of the flag the municipal flag is displayed.
Gmina Tarnawatka		The municipal flag, designed by Henryk Seroka, was established by resolution nr XXIII/155/2017 of 27 September 2017. It is a rectangular flag with proportions of 5:8, red in colour, In the central part of the emblem from the municipal coat of arms is displayed.
Gmina Telatyn		The municipal flag, designed by Robert Szydlik, was established by resolution nr XVII/88/2012 of 21 November 2012. It is a rectangular flag with proportions of 5:8, red in colour, in the central part of the flag the emblem from the municipal coat of arms is displayed.
City of Tomaszów Lubelski		The municipal flag was established by resolution nr XXXVI/312/2001 of 6 August 2001. It is a rectangular flag with proportions of 5:8, white in colour, in the central part of the flag the city coat of arms is displayed.
Gmina Tomaszów Lubelski		The municipal flag was established by resolution nr III/11/2024 of 24 May 2024. It is a rectangular flag with proportions of 5:8, divided into two horizontal strips: red and green in the ratio of 3:1. On the left side of the flag the emblem from the municipal coat of arms is displayed.
Gmina Ulhówek		The municipal flag was established by resolution nr XVII/88/2012 of 31 August 2012. It is a rectangular flag with proportions of 5:8, divided into two equal horizontal strips: blue and red. In the central part of flag the municipal coat of arms is displayed.

=== Włodawa County ===
Municipality	Flag	Description
Gmina Hańsk		The municipal flag was established by resolution nr XXI/150/09 of 30 June 2009. It is a rectangular flag with proportions of 5:8, red in colour, in the central part of the flag the emblem from the municipal coat of arms is displayed.
City of Włodawa		The municipal flag, designed by Alfreda Znamierowski, It is a rectangular flag with proportions of 5:8, divided into two parts with the ratio of 3:5 – the left side, green in colour, with crossed golden torches and swords (arranged to symbolise the coat of arms of Jelita) and the right hand, on which two white triangles are placed, pointing to the right (forming the letter ‘W’).

=== City of Zamość ===
Flag	Opis
	The city flag, designed by Jacek Skorupski, was established by resolution nr XVIII/121/95 of 28 August 1995. It is a rectangular flag with proportions of 5:8, divided diagonally into two equal parts: red and yellow. In the upper left corner of the flag, there is the coat of arms of Jelita, which was used by the founder of the city, Jan Zamoyski.

=== Zamość County ===
Municipality	Flag	Description
Gmina Adamów		The municipal flag was established by resolution nr VII/59/15 of 8 September 2015. It is a rectangular flag with proportions of 5:8, divided into three horizontal strips: two green and one yellow in the ratio of 5:1:1. the emblem from the municipality's coat of arms is displayed in the central part of the upper band.
Gmina Komarów-Osada		The municipal flag was established by resolution nr XVII/110/08 of 18 July 2008. It is a rectangular flag with proportions of 5:8, divided into three horizontal strips: yellow, white and red in the ratio of 1:3:1. On the left side of the flag the municipal coat of arms is displayed.
City of Krasnobród and gmina Krasnobród		The municipal flag was established by resolution nr XXVIII/192/93 of 9 May 1993. It is a rectangular flag with proportions of 5:8, divided into two equal horizontal strips: yellow and red.
Gmina Łabunie		The municipal flag, designed by Lech-Tadeusz Karczewski,was established by resolution nr XIII/76/2012 of 23 May 2012. It is a rectangular flag with proportions of 5:8, blue in colour, in the centre of the flag the emblem from the municipal coat of arms is displayed.
Gmina Miączyn		The municipal flag was established by resolution nr XXV/141/09 of 30 April 2009. It is a rectangular flag with proportions of 5:8, divided into three horizontal strips: yellow, white and red in the ratio of 1:3:1. In the central part of the flag the municipal coat of arms is displayed.
Gmina Nielisz		The municipal flag, designed by Gerard Kucharski, was established by resolution nr XVI/95/2016 of 12 February 2016. It is a rectangular flag with proportions of 5:8, red in colour, in the central part of the flag the emblem from the municipal coat of arms is placed.
Gmina Stary Zamość		The municipal flag, designed by Robert Szydlik, was established by resolution nr XXXVII/207/18 of 20 September 2018. It is a rectangular flag with proportions of 5:8, red in colour, on the left side of the flag the emblem from the municipal coat of arms is displayed.
Gmina Sułów		The municipal flag, designed by Kamil Wójcikowski and Robert Fidura, was established by resolution nr X/71/2024 of 30 December 2024. It is a rectangular flag with proportions of 5:8, red in colour, in the centre of the flag the emblem from the municipal coat of arms is placed.
Gmina Zamość		The municipal flag is a rectangular flag with proportions of 5:8, divided into two parts in the ratio of 5:3 – the left side, red in colour, displaying the emblem from the municipal coat of arms displayed. The right side is divided into seven equal horizontal strips: two red, yellow and white.

== Former flags ==
Municipality	Flag	Description
Gmina Chełm		The municipal flag, designed by Piotr Dymmel, was established by resolution XLVIII/270/2006 of 26 October 2006, repealed by Resolution No. LX/571/2023 of 30 January 2023. It was a rectangular flag with proportions of 5:8, divided into three horizontal strips: white, green and yellow in the ratio of 1:2:1. In the central part of the flag the emblem from the municipal coat of arms may have been displayed.

== See also ==
- List of County flags in the Lublin Voivodeship
