= Kurówka =

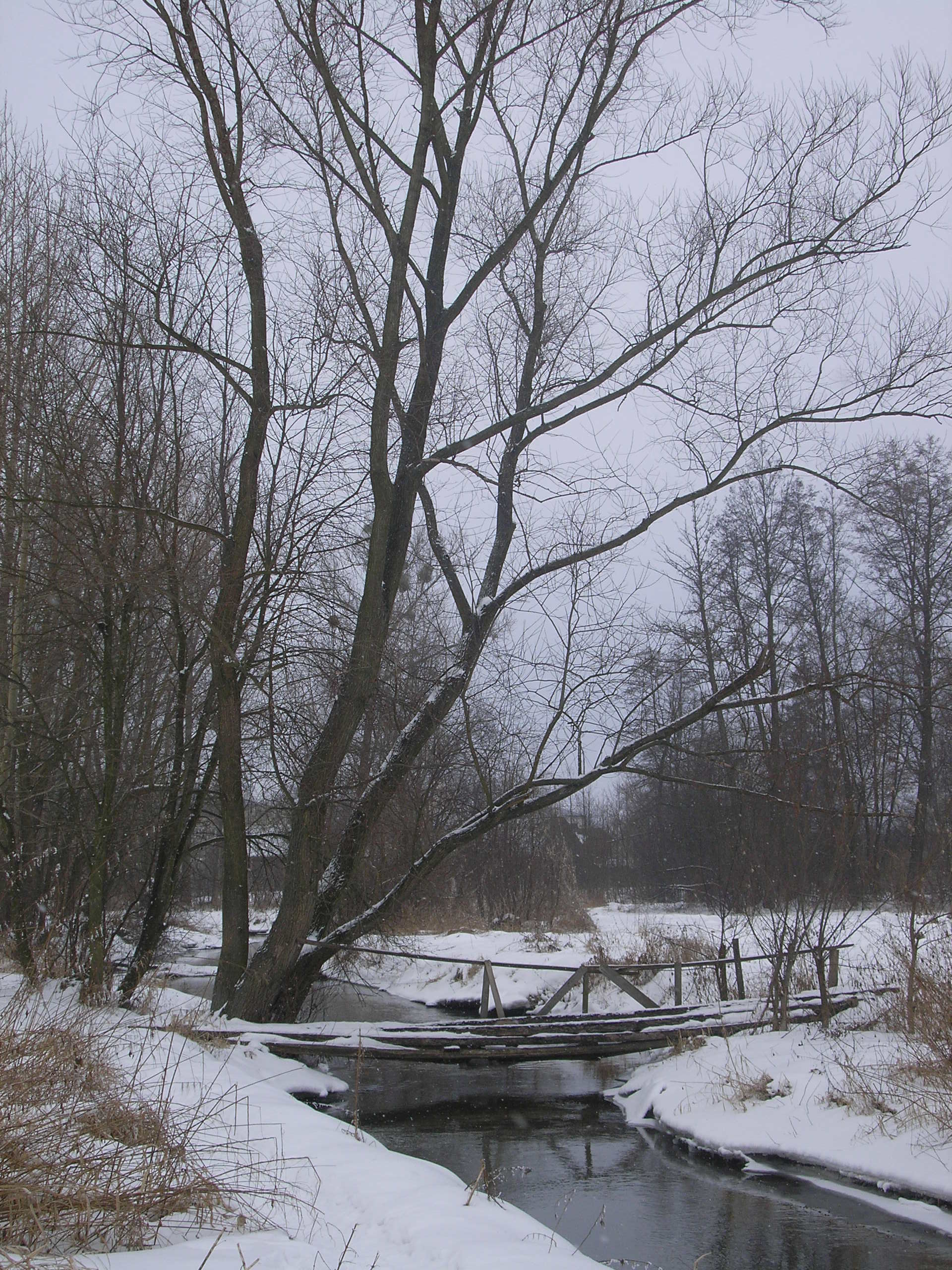
- Pedestrian bridge

Location
- Country: Poland

Physical characteristics
- Mouth
  - location: Vistula
  - coordinates: 51.4408°N 21.9458°E

Basin features
- Progression: Vistula→ Baltic Sea

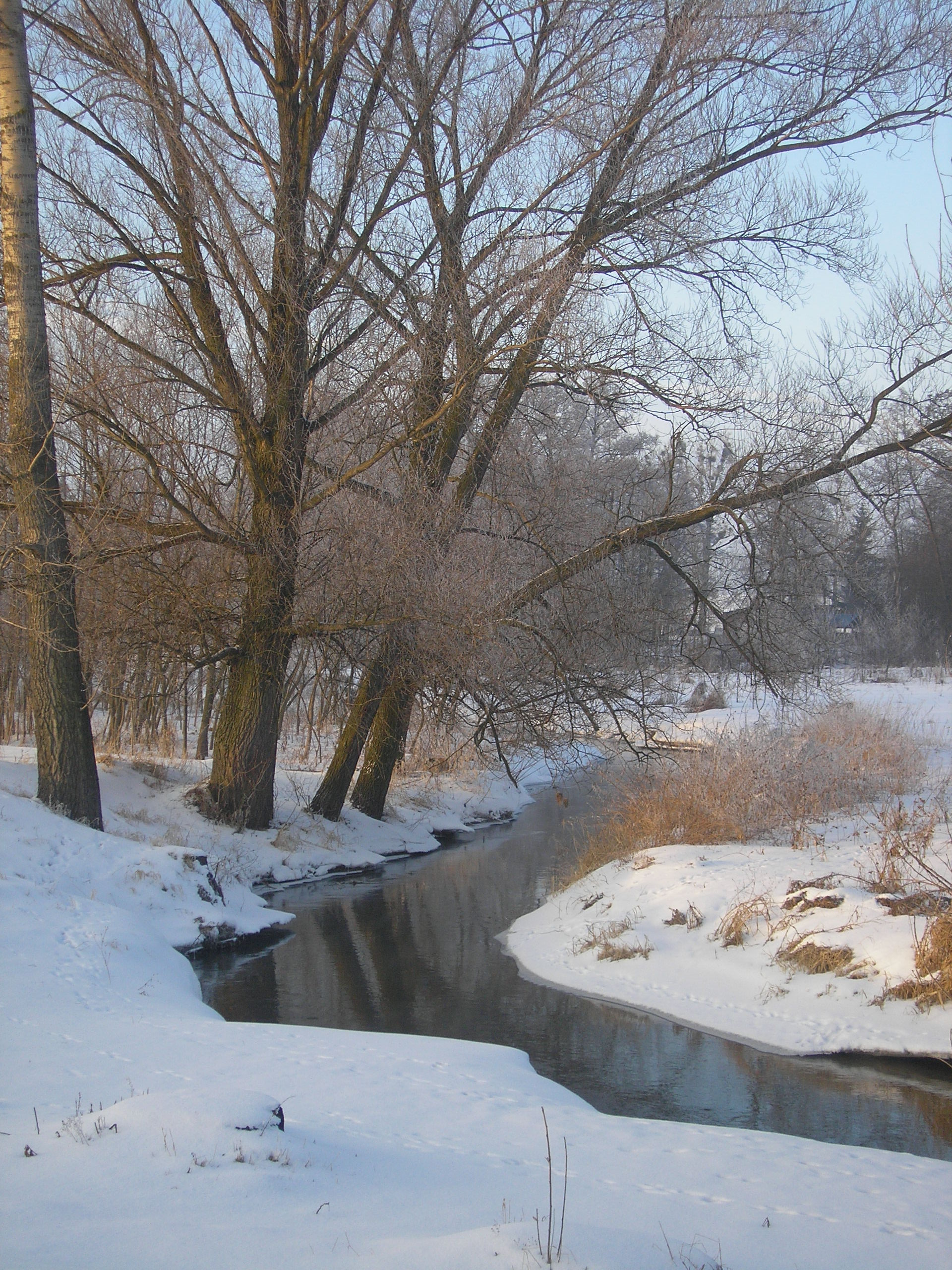
Kurówka in Chrząchów

The Kurówka is a river in South-East Poland, and a right tributary of Vistula River. Its length is approximately 50 kilometres and its basin covers roughly 395.4 km^{2}. Its source is located near the village of Piotrowice Wielkie and it joins the Vistula in Puławy. Among the notable villages located along the river are Garbów, Markuszów, Kurów and Końskowola.

Because the nitrogen production plant in Puławy uses the river as the main source of water, it has been canalized and separated from the Vistula by a system of dams and water gates. Apart from smaller streams, the river has two main tributaries: right tributary named Białka (sometimes referred to as Bielkowa), and left tributary named Garbówka (sometimes referred to as Struga Kurowska).
