= Abramów =

Abramów may refer to the following places in Lublin Voivodeship, Poland:

- Abramów, Biłgoraj County
- Abramów, Lubartów County
