= Lesce (disambiguation) =

Lesce may refer to:

- Lesce, a town in Upper Carniola, Slovenia
- Leśce, a village in Lublin Voivodeship, Poland
- Lešće, a neighborhood of Belgrade, Serbia
- Ličko Lešće, a village in Croatia
- Malo Lešče, a settlement in White Carniola, Slovenia
