= List of county flags in the Lublin Voivodeship =

List of County flags (powiat) in the Lublin Voivodeship, Poland have symbols in the form of flags.

Flag of the Lublin Voivodeship

According to the definition, a flag is a sheet of fabric of a specific shape, colour and meaning, attached to a spar or mast. It may also include the coat of arms or emblem of the administrative unit it represents. In Poland, territorial units (municipal, city, and county councils) may establish flags in accordance with the Act of 21 December 1978 on badges and uniforms. In its original version, the act only allowed territorial units to establish coats of arms. It was not until the "Act of 29 December 1998 amending certain acts in connection with the implementation of the state system reform" that the right for provinces, counties, and municipalities to establish a flag as the symbol of their territorial unit was officially confirmed. This change benefited powiats, which were reinstated in 1999.

In 2025, 18 out of 20 counties in the Lublin Province had their own flags (the counties of Biała and Hrubieszów did not have flags), as did all four cities with county rights. The symbol was established by the province itself in 2004.

== List of county flags ==
=== Cities with powiat rights ===
City	Flag	Description
Biała Podlaska		The city flag was established on 11 September 1997. It is a rectangular flag with proportions 5:8, divided into four horizontal strips: silver, green, gold and red in the ratio of 2:1:1:2. In the central part of the flag the municipal coat of arms is displayed.
Chełm		The city flag is a rectangular flag, divided into two equal horizontal strips. In the upper part of the flag the municipal coat arms is displayed.
Lublin	City flag Official flag of the city	The municipal flag was established on 31 May 1989, it was established by resolution nr 465/XXI/2004 of 8 July 2004. It is a rectangular flag with proportions of 5:8, divided into three horizontal strips: white, green and red in the ratio of 2:1:2. In the official version of the flag the coat of arms of Lublin are displayed.
Zamość		The city flag, designed by Jacek Skorupski, was established by resolution nr XVIII/121/95 of 28 August 1995. It is a rectangular flag with proportions of 5:8, divided diagonally into two equal parts: red and yellow. In the upper left corner is the coat of arms of Jelita, which was used by the city's founder, Jan Zamoyski.

=== Counties ===
County	Flag	Description
Powiat biłgorajski		The county flag, designed by Henryk Seroka, was established by resolution nr XXV/101/2000 of 27 June 2000. It is a rectangular flag with proportions of 5:8, divided into three horizontal strips: red, white and yellow in the ratio of 1:2:1. In the central part of the flag the county coat of arms is displayed.
Powiat chełmski		The county flag was established by resolution nr XVIII/140/09 of 24 April 2009. It is a rectangular flag with proportions of 5:8, green in colour, in the central part of the flag the emblem from the county coat of arms is displayed.
Powiat janowski		The county flag was established by resolution nr XIX/149/04 of 3 December 2004. It is a curved flag, divided into two parts: the left side, green in colour, is rectangular in shape (side proportions 5:4) with the emblem from the county coat of arms. The right side is in the form of a rounded tail, divided into seven equal horizontal stripes: four white and three yellow, referring to the municipalities of the county.
Powiat krasnostawski		The county flag, designed by priest. Paweł Dudziński, was established by resolution nr XIV/105/2000 of 7 March 2000. It is a rectangular flag with proportions of 5:8, divided into three horizontal strips: red, white and yellow in the ratio of 1:2:1. In the central part of the flag the county coat of arms is displayed.
Powiat kraśnicki		The county flag, designed by Janusz Łosowski, was established by resolution nr XXV/146/2000 of 29 December 2000. It is a rectangular flag with proportions of 5:8, divided into three equal vertical strips: red, silver and gold. In the central part of the flag the county coat of arms is displayed.
Powiat lubartowski		The county flag, designed by Henryk Seroka and Dariusz Dessauer, was established by resolution nr XXXV/248/06 of 23 October 2006. It is a rectangular flag with proportions of 1:2, divided into two equal strips: the left side, white in colour, displays the emblem from the county coat of arms. The right side is divided into nine equal horizontal strips: five red and four blue.
Powiat lubelski		The county flag was established by resolution nr XXXIII/284/01 of 21 December 2001. It is a curved flag, divided into two parts: the left side, red in colour, square in shape with the coat of arms of the county and a right-hand tail cut downwards, divided into sixteen equal horizontal white and yellow stripes.
Powiat łęczyński		The municipal flag was established by resolution nr XXXI/172/2001 of 19 December 2001. It is a rectangular flag with proportions of 5:8, divided into two equal horizontal strips: blue and red. In the central part of the flag the emblem from the county coat of arms is displayed.
Powiat łukowski		The municipal flag was established by resolution nr XXV/217/2005 of 23 June 2005. It is a curved flag that is divided into two parts: the left side, red in colour, is square in shape with the coat of arms of the county and a rounded tail on the right, divided into eleven equal horizontal stripes: six white and five yellow, referring to the municipalities of the county.
Powiat opolski		The county flag, designed by priest Paweł Dudziński, was established by resolution nr XIII/96/2000 z 15 marca 2000. It is a rectangular flag, divided into three horizontal strips: red, white and yellow in the ratio of 1:2:1. In the central part of the flag the county coat of arms is displayed.
Powiat parczewski		The first version of the flag was established by resolution nr XXI/96/2000 of 31 May 2000, the current version, designed Kamil Wójcikowski and Robert Fidura, was established by resolution nr V/33/2024 of 30 August 2024. It is a rectangular flag with proportions of 5:8, divided into two equal strips: the left side displays the emblem from the county coat of arms. The right side divided into seven equal horizontal stripes, referring to the municipalities of the county: four red, two white and one yellow.
Powiat puławski		The first version of the flag was established by resolution nr XXX/280/2001 of 26 September 2001, was established by resolution nr XVIII/164/2012 of 27 June 2012. It is a rectangular flag divided into three horizontal strips: two red and one dark blue in the ratio of 5:1:1. In the upper left part of the flag the emblem from the municipal coat of arms is displayed.
Powiat radzyński		The county flag, designed Krzysztof Skupieński and Dariusz Dessauer, was established by resolution nr XX/174/2005 of 21 April 2005. It is a curved flag divided into two parts: the left side, red in colour, has the emblem of the county coat of arms. The right side has the form of a rounded tail, divided into eight equal horizontal silver and gold stripes.
Powiat rycki		The county flag, designed by Krzysztof Skupieński, was established by resolution nr XLII/238/2002 of 4 October 2002. It is a curved flag, divided into two parts: the left side, blue in colour, is square-shaped with the coat of arms of the county. The right side has the form of a rounded tail, divided into six equal horizontal white and red stripes.
Powiat świdnicki		The county flag, designed by priests Paweł Dudziński, was established by resolution nr XV/78/99 of 21 December 1999. It is a rectangular flag, divided into three horizontal strips: two red and one white in the ratio of 1:2:1. The central part of the flag the county coat of arms is displayed.
Powiat tomaszowski		The county flag was established by resolution nr XIII/89/2000 of 19 September 2000. It is a rectangular flag with the proportions of 5:8, white in colour, with the county coat of arms is displayed.
Powiat włodawski		The county flag was established by resolution nr XXII/155/2001 of 28 August 2001. It is a rectangular flag with proportions of 5:8, it is divided into two equal horizontal strips: yellow and green. In the central part of the flag the county coat of arms is displayed.
Powiat zamojski		The county flag was established by resolution nr XXVII/105/2001 of 23 April 2001. It is a rectangular flag with proportions of 5:8, divided into two equal vertical strips: red and blue. In the central part of the flag the county coat of arms is displayed.

== See also ==
- List of municipal flags in the Lublin Voivodeship
