= Gilów, Lublin Voivodeship =

Gilów
- Village
- Location within Poland
- Coordinates: 50°45′39″N 22°44′15″E
- Country: Poland
- Voivodeship: Lublin
- County: Biłgoraj
- Gmina: Goraj

Population
  - Total: 205

Gilów [ˈɡiluf] is a village in the administrative district of Gmina Goraj, within Biłgoraj County, Lublin Voivodeship, in eastern Poland. The village lies approximately 8 km (5 mi) north-east of Goraj, 24 km (15 mi) north of Biłgoraj, and 56 km (35 mi) south of the regional capital Lublin.
