= Chrząchówek =

- Village
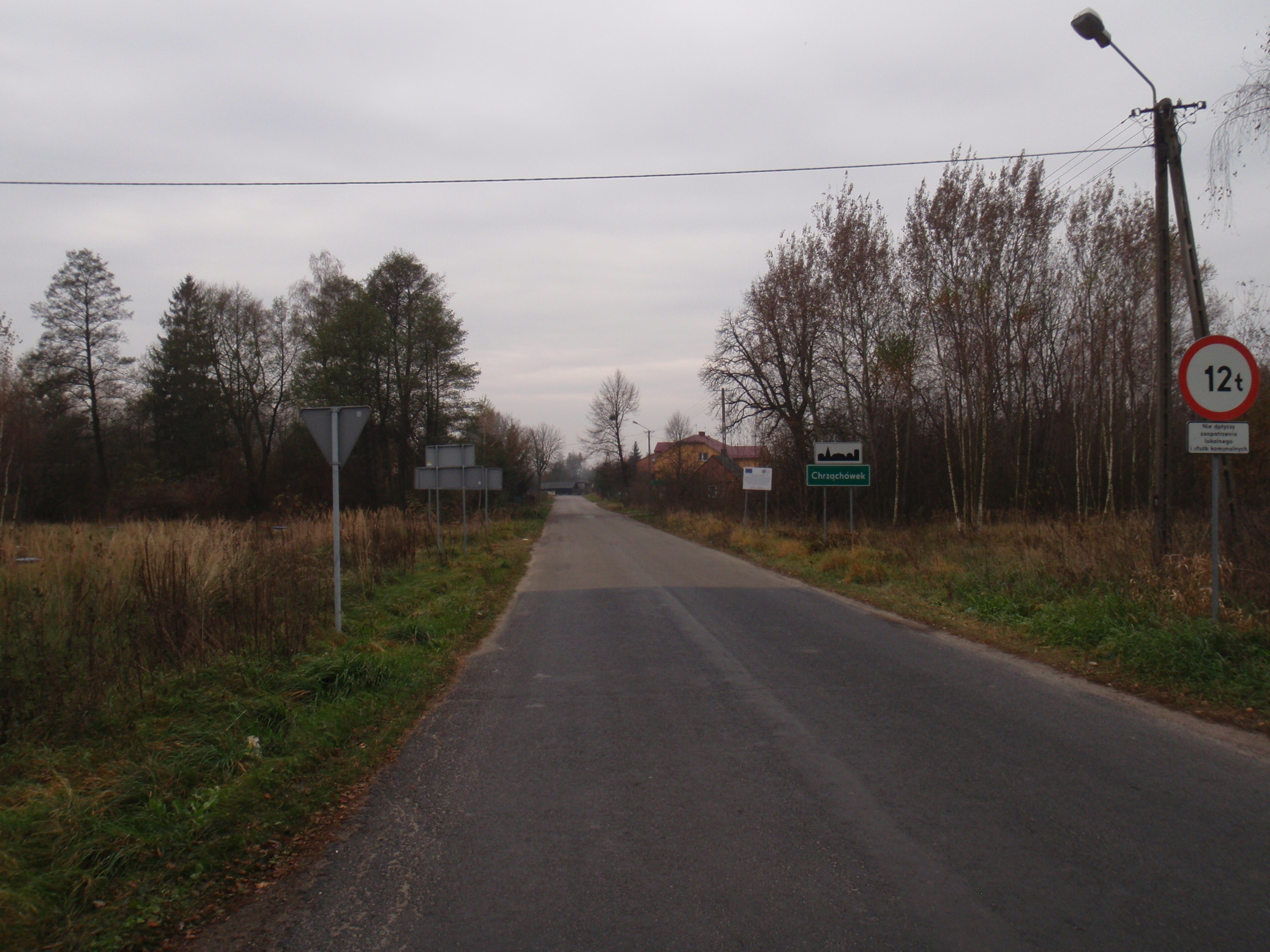
- Chrząchówek

- Location within Poland
- Coordinates: 51°25′N 22°8′E
- Country: Poland
- Voivodeship: Lublin
- County: Puławy
- Gmina: Końskowola
- Population: 465

Chrząchówek [xʂɔ̃ˈxuvɛk] is a village in the administrative district of Gmina Końskowola, within Puławy County, Lublin Voivodeship, in eastern Poland.
