= Przybysławice, Lublin Voivodeship =

Przybysławice
- Village
- Location within Poland
- Coordinates: 51°22′8″N 22°16′53″E
- Country: Poland
- Voivodeship: Lublin
- County: Lublin
- Gmina: Garbów

Przybysławice [pʂɨbɨswaˈvit͡sɛ] is a village in the administrative district of Gmina Garbów, within Lublin County, Lublin Voivodeship, in eastern Poland.
