= Pulki =

- Village
- Location within Poland
- Coordinates: 51°26′N 22°6′E
- Country: Poland
- Voivodeship: Lublin
- County: Puławy
- Gmina: Końskowola
- Population: 137

Pulki [ˈpulki] is a village in the administrative district of Gmina Końskowola, within Puławy County, Lublin Voivodeship, in eastern Poland.
