= Średniówka, Lublin Voivodeship =

Średniówka
- Village
- Location within Poland
- Coordinates: 50°42′26″N 22°44′53″E
- Country: Poland
- Voivodeship: Lublin
- County: Biłgoraj
- Gmina: Goraj

Population
  - Total: 180

Średniówka [ɕrɛdˈɲufka] is a village in the administrative district of Gmina Goraj, within Biłgoraj County, Lublin Voivodeship, in eastern Poland.
