= Bogucin, Lublin Voivodeship =

Bogucin
- Village
- Location within Poland
- Coordinates: 51°20′N 22°21′E
- Country: Poland
- Voivodeship: Lublin
- County: Lublin
- Gmina: Garbów
- Elevation: 200 m (660 ft)

Population
  - Total: 983

Bogucin [bɔˈɡut͡ɕin] is a village in the administrative district of Gmina Garbów, within Lublin County, Lublin Voivodeship, in eastern Poland.
