= Piotrowice-Kolonia =

- Village
- Location within Poland
- Coordinates: 51°21′18″N 22°25′0″E
- Country: Poland
- Voivodeship: Lublin
- County: Lublin
- Gmina: Garbów

Piotrowice-Kolonia [pjɔtrɔˈvit͡sɛ kɔˈlɔɲa] is a village in the administrative district of Gmina Garbów, within Lublin County, Lublin Voivodeship, in eastern Poland.
