= Jędrzejówka, Lublin Voivodeship =

Jędrzejówka
- Village
- Location within Poland
- Coordinates: 50°42′42″N 22°46′2″E
- Country: Poland
- Voivodeship: Lublin
- County: Biłgoraj
- Gmina: Goraj

Population
  - Total: 210

Jędrzejówka [jɛndʐɛˈjufka] is a village in the administrative district of Gmina Goraj, within Biłgoraj County, Lublin Voivodeship, in eastern Poland.
