= Kondraty =

- Village
- Location within Poland
- Coordinates: 50°45′N 22°43′E
- Country: Poland
- Voivodeship: Lublin
- County: Biłgoraj
- Gmina: Goraj
- Elevation: 310 m (1,020 ft)

Population
  - Total: 204

Kondraty [kɔnˈdratɨ] is a village in the administrative district of Gmina Goraj, within Biłgoraj County, Lublin Voivodeship, in eastern Poland.
