= Zagrody, Gmina Goraj =

Zagrody
- Village
- Location within Poland
- Coordinates: 50°44′26″N 22°40′8″E
- Country: Poland
- Voivodeship: Lublin
- County: Biłgoraj
- Gmina: Goraj

Population
  - Total: 692

Zagrody [zaˈɡrɔdɨ] is a village in the administrative district of Gmina Goraj, within Biłgoraj County, Lublin Voivodeship, in eastern Poland.
