= Albinów Mały =

- Village
- Location within Poland
- Coordinates: 50°43′N 22°44′E
- Country: Poland
- Voivodeship: Lublin
- County: Biłgoraj
- Gmina: Goraj

Population
  - Total: 40

Albinów Mały [alˈbinuf ˈmawɨ] is a village in the administrative district of Gmina Goraj, within Biłgoraj County, Lublin Voivodeship, in eastern Poland.
