= Majdan Abramowski =

- Village
- Location within Poland
- Coordinates: 50°43′N 22°46′E
- Country: Poland
- Voivodeship: Lublin
- County: Biłgoraj
- Gmina: Goraj

Population
  - Total: 113

Majdan Abramowski (Polish pronunciation: [ˈmajdan abraˈmɔfskʲi]) is a village in the administrative district of Gmina Goraj, within Biłgoraj County, Lublin Voivodeship, in eastern Poland.

From 1975 to 1998, the village was administratively attached to the Zamość Voivodeship.
