= Meszno, Lublin County =

Meszno
- Village
- Location within Poland
- Coordinates: 51°24′37″N 22°23′13″E
- Country: Poland
- Voivodeship: Lublin
- County: Lublin
- Gmina: Garbów

Meszno [ˈmɛʂnɔ] is a village in the administrative district of Gmina Garbów, within Lublin County, Lublin Voivodeship, in eastern Poland.
