= Wronów, Puławy County =

Wronów
- Village
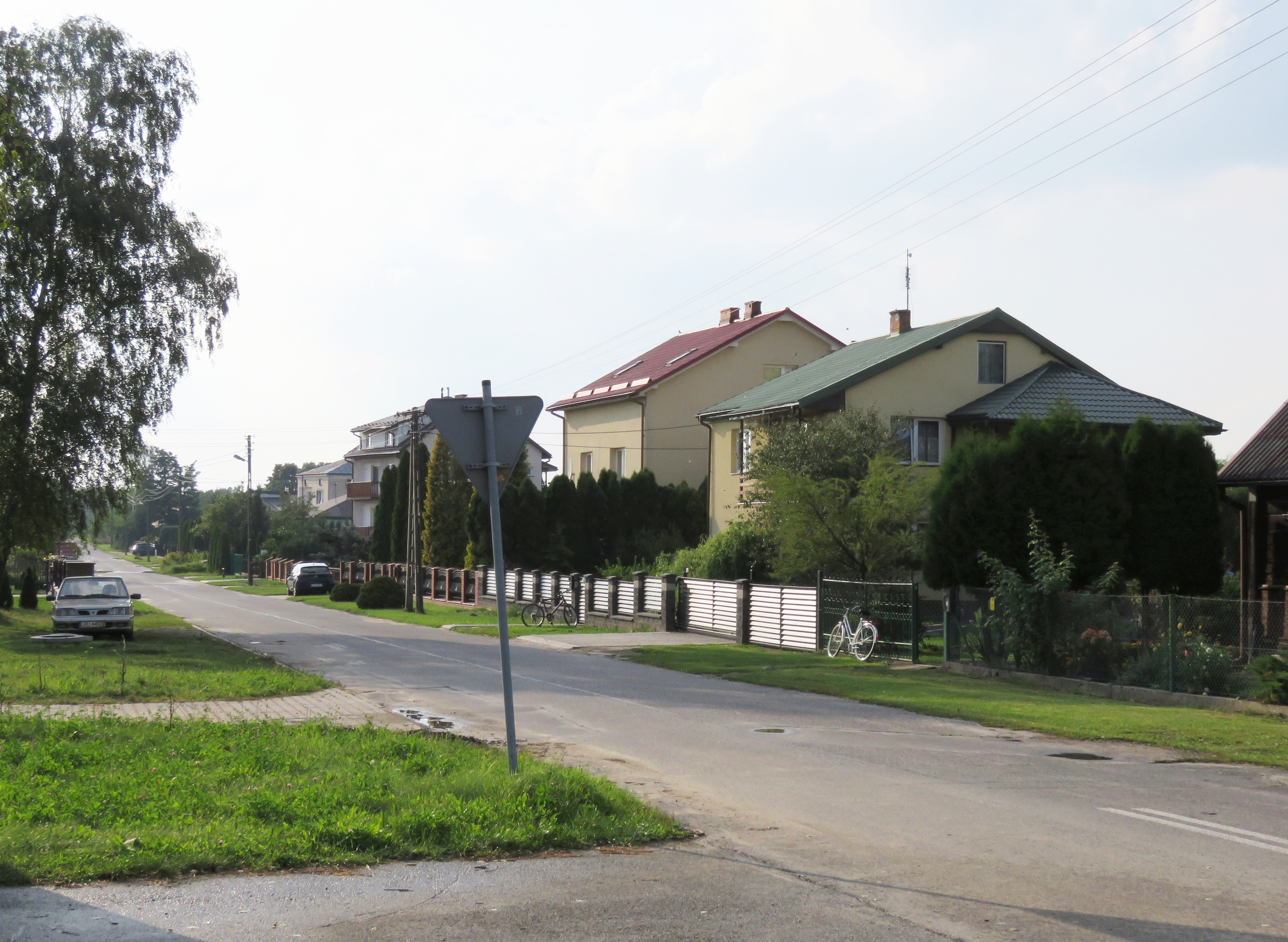
- Houses in Wronów

- Location within Poland
- Coordinates: 51°27′13″N 22°02′20″E
- Country: Poland
- Voivodeship: Lublin
- County: Puławy
- Gmina: Końskowola

Population
  - Total: 389
- Time zone: UTC+1 (CET)
  - Summer (DST): UTC+2 (CEST)

Wronów [ˈvrɔnuf] is a village in the administrative district of Gmina Końskowola, within Puławy County, Lublin Voivodeship, in eastern Poland.

== History ==
Six Polish citizens were murdered by Nazi Germany in the village during World War II.
