= Skowieszyn =

- Village
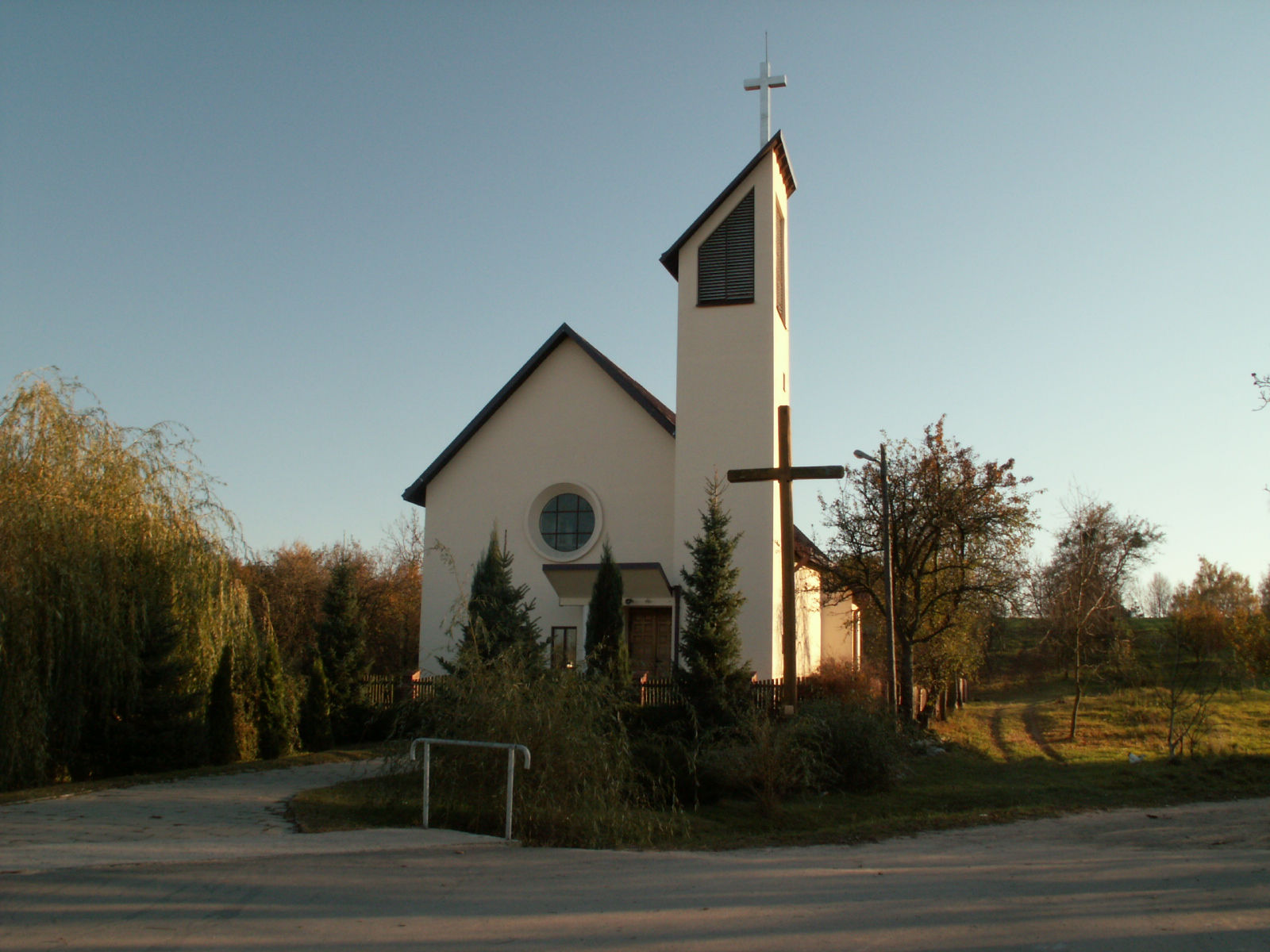
- Church of Our Lady of Mercy

- Location within Poland
- Coordinates: 51°23′25″N 22°1′46″E
- Country: Poland
- Voivodeship: Lublin
- County: Puławy
- Gmina: Końskowola

Population
  - Total: 751

Skowieszyn [skɔˈvjɛʂɨn] is a village in the administrative district of Gmina Końskowola, within Puławy County, Lublin Voivodeship, in eastern Poland.
