= Franciszek Dionizy Kniaźnin =

Franciszek Dionizy Kniaźnin (4 October 1750, Vitebsk – 25 August 1807, Końskowola) is considered to be one of the most distinguished Polish poets of the Polish sentimentalism in the Enlightenment period.

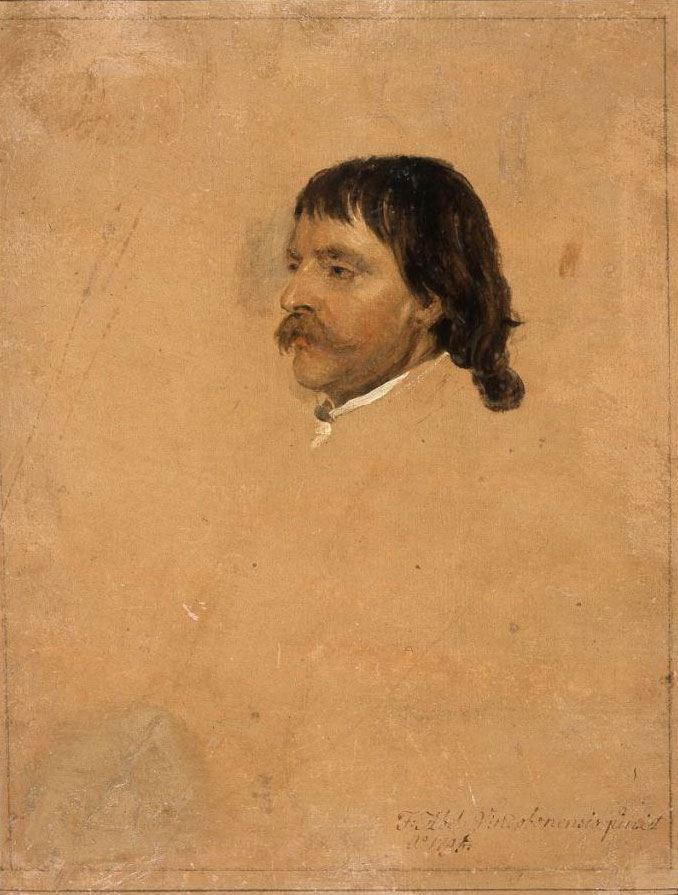
Franciszek Dyonizy Kniaźnin.

He was a member of the Jesuit order since 1764, and after its suppression—a secretary of prince Adam Kazimierz Czartoryski and teacher of his children.

He was one of the first collectors of Belarusian folklore. His poem in Belarusian "Krosenki" ("Кросенкі") was sung by Belarusian farmers as a folk song.
