= Zagrody, Lublin County =

Zagrody
- Village
- Location within Poland
- Coordinates: 51°21′47″N 22°18′6″E
- Country: Poland
- Voivodeship: Lublin
- County: Lublin
- Gmina: Garbów

Zagrody [zaˈɡrɔdɨ] is a village in the administrative district of Gmina Garbów, within Lublin County, Lublin Voivodeship, in eastern Poland.
