= Zastawie, Biłgoraj County =

Zastawie
- Village
- Location within Poland
- Coordinates: 50°43′29″N 22°40′28″E
- Country: Poland
- Voivodeship: Lublin
- County: Biłgoraj
- Gmina: Goraj

Population
  - Total: 618

Zastawie [zasˈtavjɛ] is a village in the administrative district of Gmina Goraj, within Biłgoraj County, Lublin Voivodeship, in eastern Poland.
