= Borków, Lublin Voivodeship =

Borków
- Village
- Location within Poland
- Coordinates: 51°23′N 22°24′E
- Country: Poland
- Voivodeship: Lublin
- County: Lublin
- Gmina: Garbów

Borków [ˈbɔrkuf] is a village in the administrative district of Gmina Garbów, within Lublin County, Lublin Voivodeship, in eastern Poland.
