= Rudy, Lublin Voivodeship =

Rudy
- Village
- Location within Poland
- Coordinates: 51°24′57″N 22°1′57″E
- Country: Poland
- Voivodeship: Lublin
- County: Puławy
- Gmina: Końskowola
- Population: 344

Rudy [ˈrudɨ] is a village in the administrative district of Gmina Końskowola, within Puławy County, Lublin Voivodeship, in eastern Poland.
