= Stok, Puławy County =

Stok
- Village
- Location within Poland
- Coordinates: 51°20′47″N 22°04′43″E
- Country: Poland
- Voivodeship: Lublin
- County: Puławy
- Gmina: Końskowola
- Population: 452

Stok [stɔk] is a village in the administrative district of Gmina Końskowola, within Puławy County, Lublin Voivodeship, in eastern Poland.
