= Karolin, Gmina Garbów =

Karolin
- Village
- Location within Poland
- Coordinates: 51°21′44″N 22°22′44″E
- Country: Poland
- Voivodeship: Lublin
- County: Lublin
- Gmina: Garbów

Karolin [kaˈrɔlin] is a village in the administrative district of Gmina Garbów, within Lublin County, Lublin Voivodeship, in eastern Poland.
