= Stary Pożóg =

- Village
- Location within Poland
- Coordinates: 51°22′59″N 22°4′23″E
- Country: Poland
- Voivodeship: Lublin
- County: Puławy
- Gmina: Końskowola
- Population: 425

Stary Pożóg [ˈstarɨ ˈpɔʐuk] is a village in the administrative district of Gmina Końskowola, within Puławy County, Lublin Voivodeship, in eastern Poland.
