= Las Stocki =

- Village
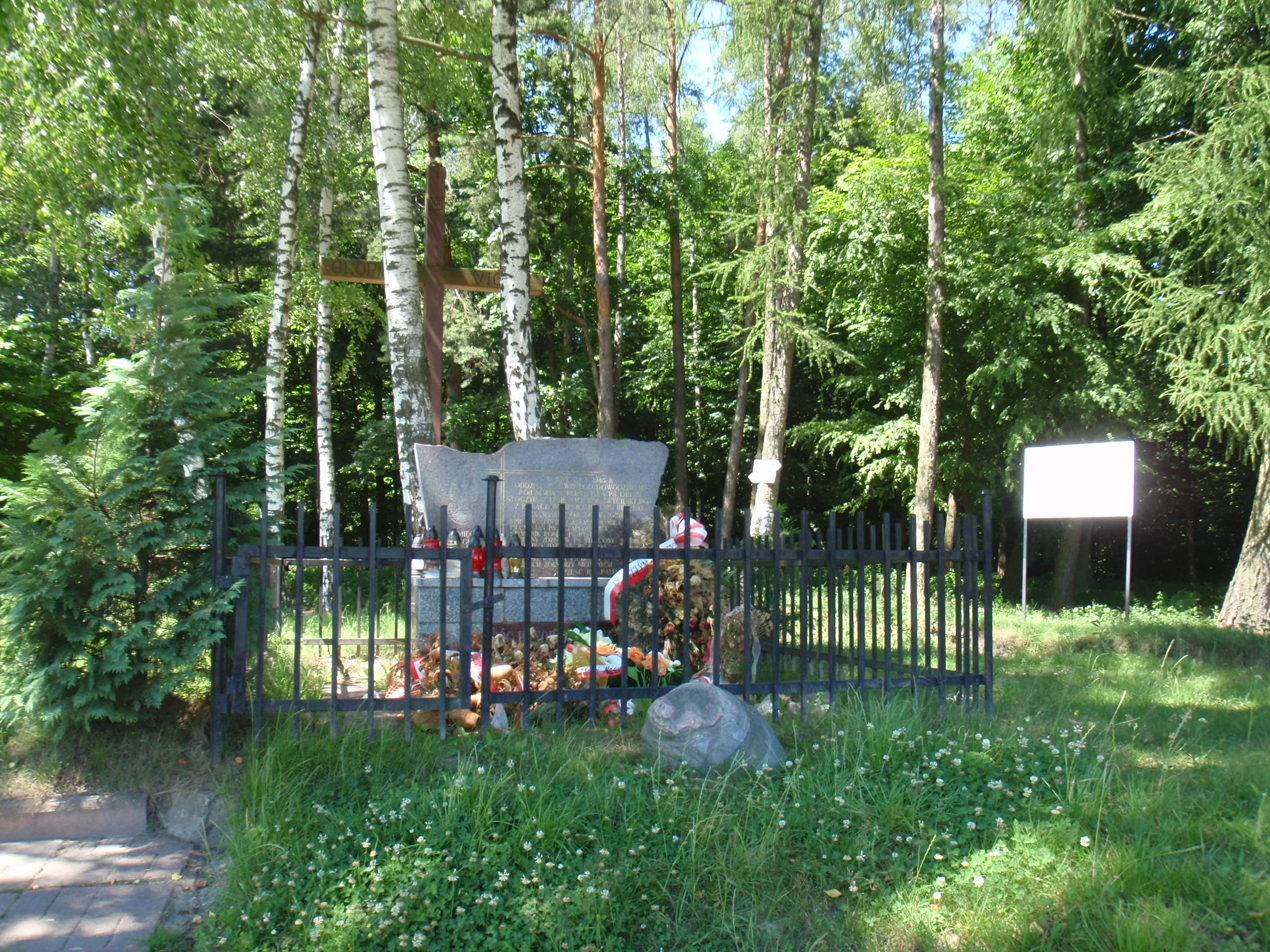
- Memorial to the fallen soldiers of the anti-communist resistance who clashed with NKVD and UB in Las Stocki in May 1945

- Location within Poland
- Coordinates: 51°22′N 22°3′E
- Country: Poland
- Voivodeship: Lublin
- County: Puławy
- Gmina: Końskowola

Population
  - Total: 219

Las Stocki [ˈlas ˈstɔt͡ski] is a village in the administrative district of Gmina Końskowola, within Puławy County, Lublin Voivodeship, in eastern Poland.
