= Gutanów =

- Village
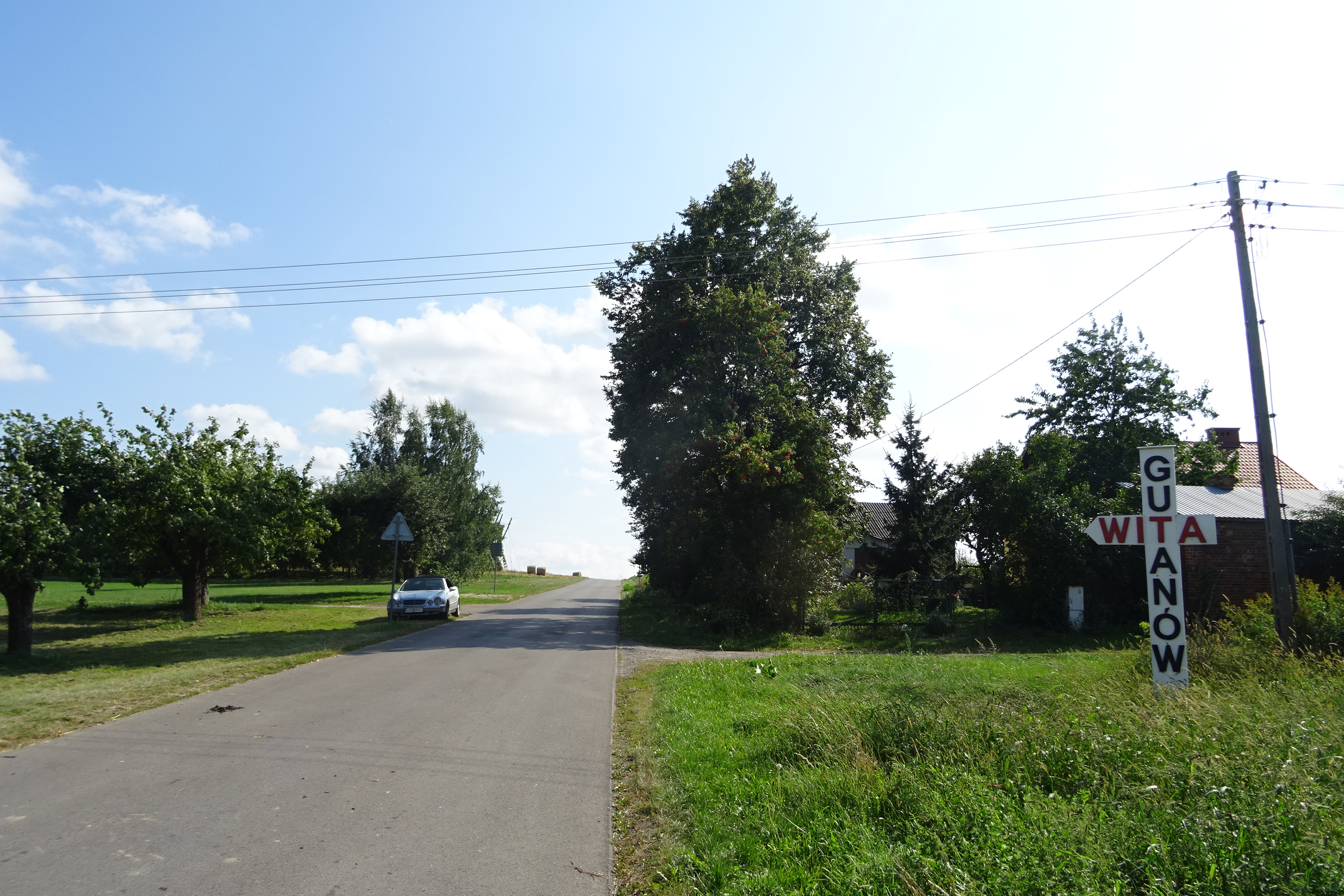

- Location within Poland
- Coordinates: 51°20′27″N 22°17′15″E
- Country: Poland
- Voivodeship: Lublin
- County: Lublin
- Gmina: Garbów
- Time zone: UTC+1 (CET)
  - Summer (DST): UTC+2 (CEST)

Gutanów [ɡuˈtanuf] is a village in the administrative district of Gmina Garbów, within Lublin County, Lublin Voivodeship, in eastern Poland.

== History ==
Three Polish citizens were murdered by Nazi Germany in the village during World War II.
