= Wola Przybysławska =

- Village
- Location within Poland
- Coordinates: 51°24′N 22°20′E
- Country: Poland
- Voivodeship: Lublin
- County: Lublin
- Gmina: Garbów

Population
  - Total: 1,600

Wola Przybysławska [ˈvɔla pʂɨbɨˈswafska] is a village in the administrative district of Gmina Garbów, within Lublin County, Lublin Voivodeship, in eastern Poland.
