= Garbów =

- Village
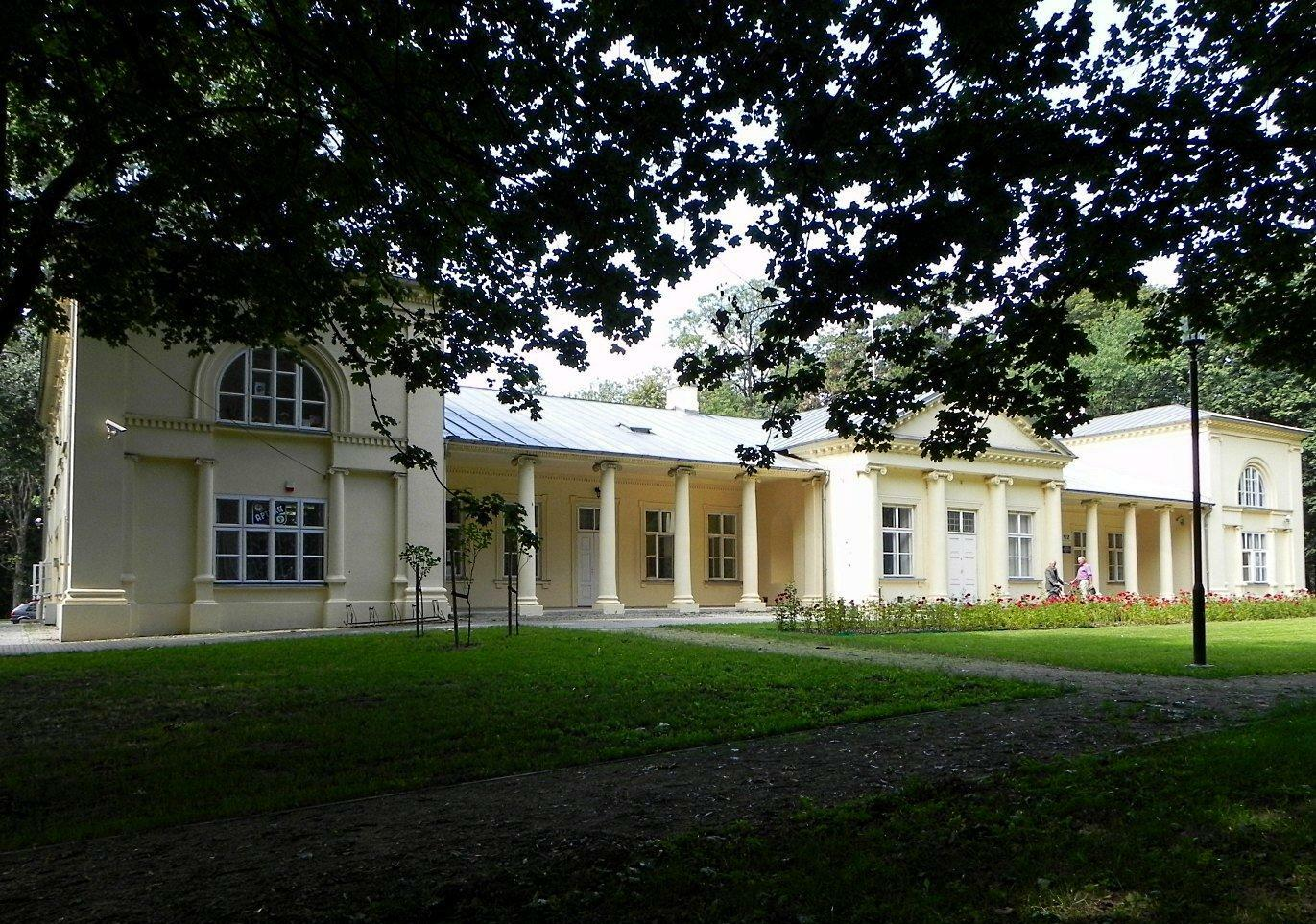
- Mid 19th century palace in Garbów, now health and wellness centre

- Location within Poland
- Coordinates: 51°21′1″N 22°20′24″E
- Country: Poland
- Voivodeship: Lublin
- County: Lublin
- Gmina: Garbów

Population
  - Total: 2,066
- Time zone: UTC+1 (CET)
  - Summer (DST): UTC+2 (CEST)
- Vehicle registration: LUB
- Website: http://www.garbow.lubelskie.pl

Garbów [ˈɡarbuf] is a village in Lublin County, Lublin Voivodeship, in eastern Poland. It is the seat of the gmina (administrative district) called Gmina Garbów. The village lies on the Kurówka river, and has a mill and a sugar refinery.

== History ==
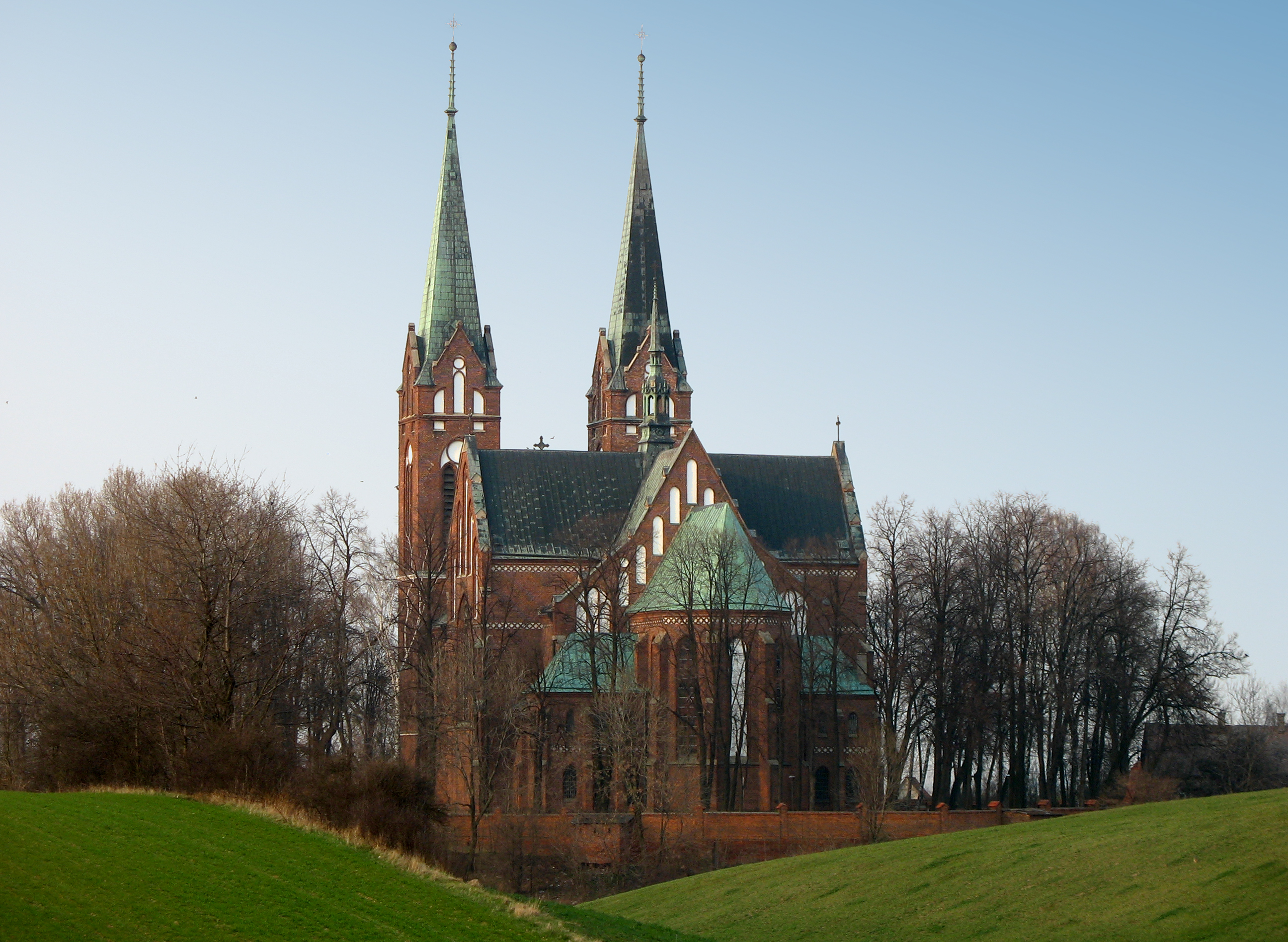
Garbów church

The village was first mentioned in 1326 as a seat of a separate parish. In the 15th century it was a personal property of the Odrowąż noble family. In 1785 it was sold to Jacek Jezierski, the castellan of Łuków and a marshal of the szlachta who made the village receive the Magdeburg Law. During the Kościuszko Uprising of 1794 the town was a battlefield of the last skirmish between the forces of Poland and Russia. After that the town was annexed by Austria in the Third Partition of Poland. After the Polish victory in the Austro-Polish War of 1809, it became part of the short-lived Duchy of Warsaw, and after the duchy's dissolution in 1815, it fell to the Russian Partition of Poland. Its town status was withdrawn.

In the interwar period, it was administratively located in the Lublin Voivodeship of Poland. According to the 1921 census, the settlement had a population of 865, 98.0% Polish and 1.6% Jewish.

Following the joint German-Soviet invasion of Poland, which started World War II in September 1939, the village was occupied by Germany until 1944.

Currently the village is formally divided onto two separate sołectwos: Garbów I and Garbów II. It is probable, that the two will be eventually merge and receive city charter again.

== Sights ==
There are some notable tourist attractions in the village. Among them is an 18th-century classicist palace, a facade of a 17th-century church destroyed in 1915 and a Gothic revival church from the early 20th century with a 1000 kilograms bell from 1512.

== Notable people ==
- Salomon Morel (1919–2007), communist war criminal who fled from justice to Israel
