= Opoka, Lublin Voivodeship =

Opoka
- Village
- Location within Poland
- Coordinates: 51°24′N 22°4′E
- Country: Poland
- Voivodeship: Lublin
- County: Puławy
- Gmina: Końskowola

Population
  - Total: 262
- Time zone: UTC+1 (CET)
  - Summer (DST): UTC+2 (CEST)

Opoka [ɔˈpɔka] is a village in the administrative district of Gmina Końskowola, within Puławy County, Lublin Voivodeship, in eastern Poland.

== History ==
Three Polish citizens were murdered by Nazi Germany in the village during World War II.
