= Hosznia Abramowska =

- Village
- Location within Poland
- Coordinates: 50°43′50″N 22°45′17″E
- Country: Poland
- Voivodeship: Lublin
- County: Biłgoraj
- Gmina: Goraj

Population
  - Total: 99

Hosznia Abramowska [ˈxɔʂɲa abraˈmɔfska] is a village in the administrative district of Gmina Goraj, within Biłgoraj County, Lublin Voivodeship, in eastern Poland.
