= Hosznia Ordynacka =

- Village
- Location within Poland
- Coordinates: 50°44′33″N 22°45′41″E
- Country: Poland
- Voivodeship: Lublin
- County: Biłgoraj
- Gmina: Goraj

Population
  - Total: 390

Hosznia Ordynacka [ˈxɔʂɲa ɔrdɨˈnat͡ska] is a village in the administrative district of Gmina Goraj, within Biłgoraj County, Lublin Voivodeship, in eastern Poland.
