= Stara Wieś, Puławy County =

Stara Wieś
- Village
- Location within Poland
- Coordinates: 51°25′N 22°4′E
- Country: Poland
- Voivodeship: Lublin
- County: Puławy
- Gmina: Końskowola
- Population: 497

Stara Wieś [ˈstara ˈvjɛɕ] is a village in the administrative district of Gmina Końskowola, within Puławy County, Lublin Voivodeship, in eastern Poland.
