= Janów, Lublin County =

Janów
- Village
- Location within Poland
- Coordinates: 51°23′16″N 22°22′09″E
- Country: Poland
- Voivodeship: Lublin
- County: Lublin
- Gmina: Garbów

Janów [ˈjanuf] is a village in the administrative district of Gmina Garbów, within Lublin County, Lublin Voivodeship, in eastern Poland.
