= Młynki, Lublin Voivodeship =

Młynki
- Village
- Location within Poland
- Coordinates: 51°25′N 22°2′E
- Country: Poland
- Voivodeship: Lublin
- County: Puławy
- Gmina: Końskowola
- Population: 578

Młynki [ˈmwɨŋki] is a village in the administrative district of Gmina Końskowola, within Puławy County, Lublin Voivodeship, in eastern Poland.
