= Abramów, Biłgoraj County =

Abramów
- Village
- Location within Poland
- Coordinates: 50°41′N 22°42′E
- Country: Poland
- Voivodeship: Lublin
- County: Biłgoraj
- Gmina: Goraj

Population
  - Total: 157

Abramów [aˈbramuf] is a village in the administrative district of Gmina Goraj, within Biłgoraj County, Lublin Voivodeship, in eastern Poland.
