= Końskowola =

- Town
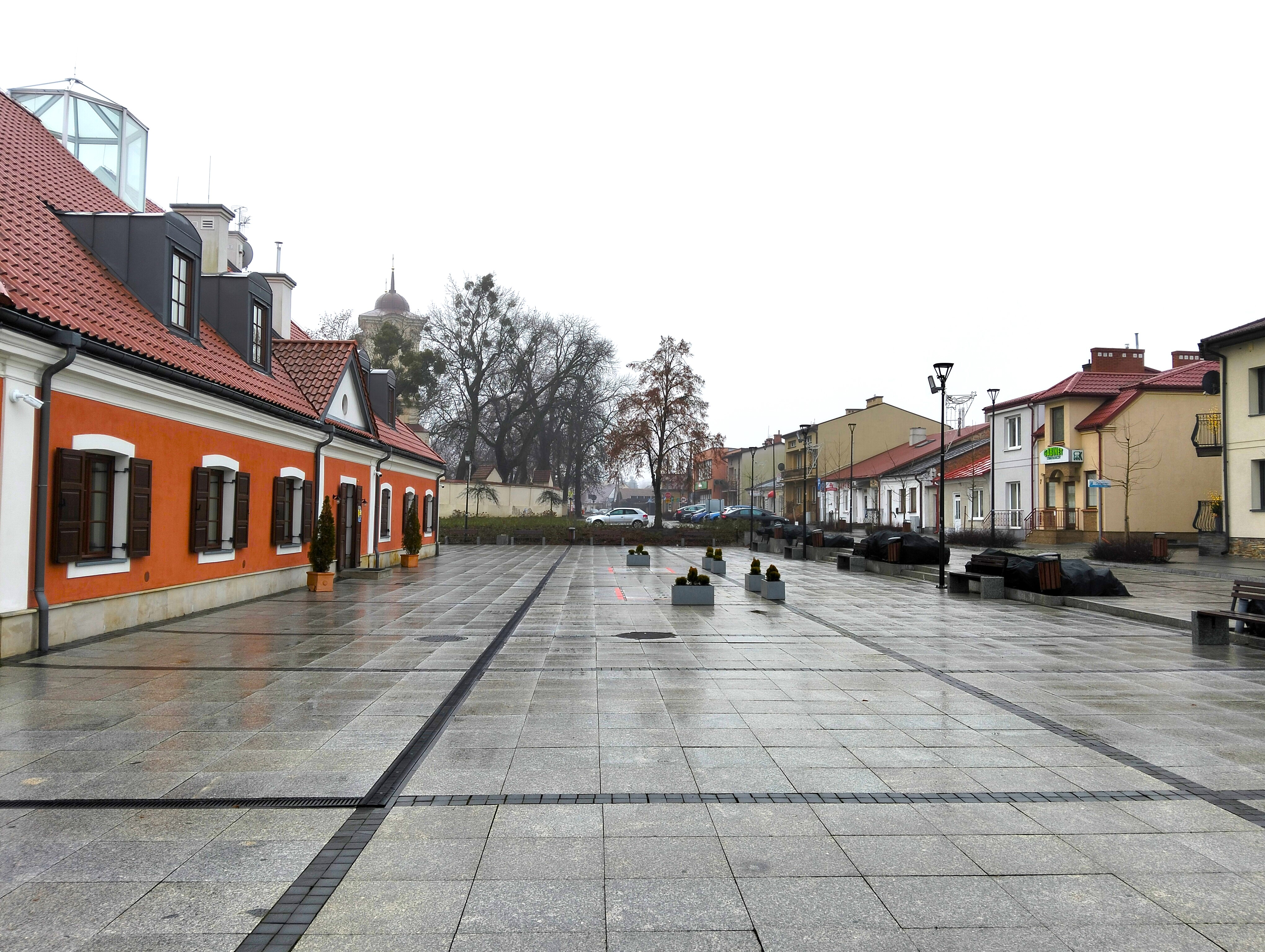
- View of the town centre

- Coat of arms

- Location within Poland
- Coordinates: 51°24′32″N 22°03′10″E
- Country: Poland
- Voivodeship: Lublin
- County: Puławy
- Gmina: Końskowola
- Established: 14th century
- Town rights: 1532-1870

Government
  - Mayor: Ewa Gruza

Area
  - Total: 9.81 km^{2} (3.79 sq mi)

Population (2004)
  - Total: 2,188
  - Density: 223/km^{2} (580/sq mi)
- Time zone: UTC+1 (CET)
  - Summer (DST): UTC+2 (CEST)
- Postal code: 24-130
- Area code: +48 81
- Car Plates: LPU
- Website: Official webpage

Końskowola pronounced [kɔɲskɔˈvɔla] is a town in eastern Poland (historic Lesser Poland region), located between Puławy and Lublin, near Kurów on the Kurówka River. It is the seat of a separate commune (gmina) within Puławy County in Lublin Voivodeship, called Gmina Końskowola; population: 2,188 inhabitants (as of 2005).

== Etymology ==
Końskowola literally translates as Horse's Will. The name originated from the surname of its early owner Jan z Konina (Jan Koniński, John of Konin), and the toponym Wola - a type of a village. A slightly different spelling of the same name, "Konińskawola" is noted in 1442.

== History ==
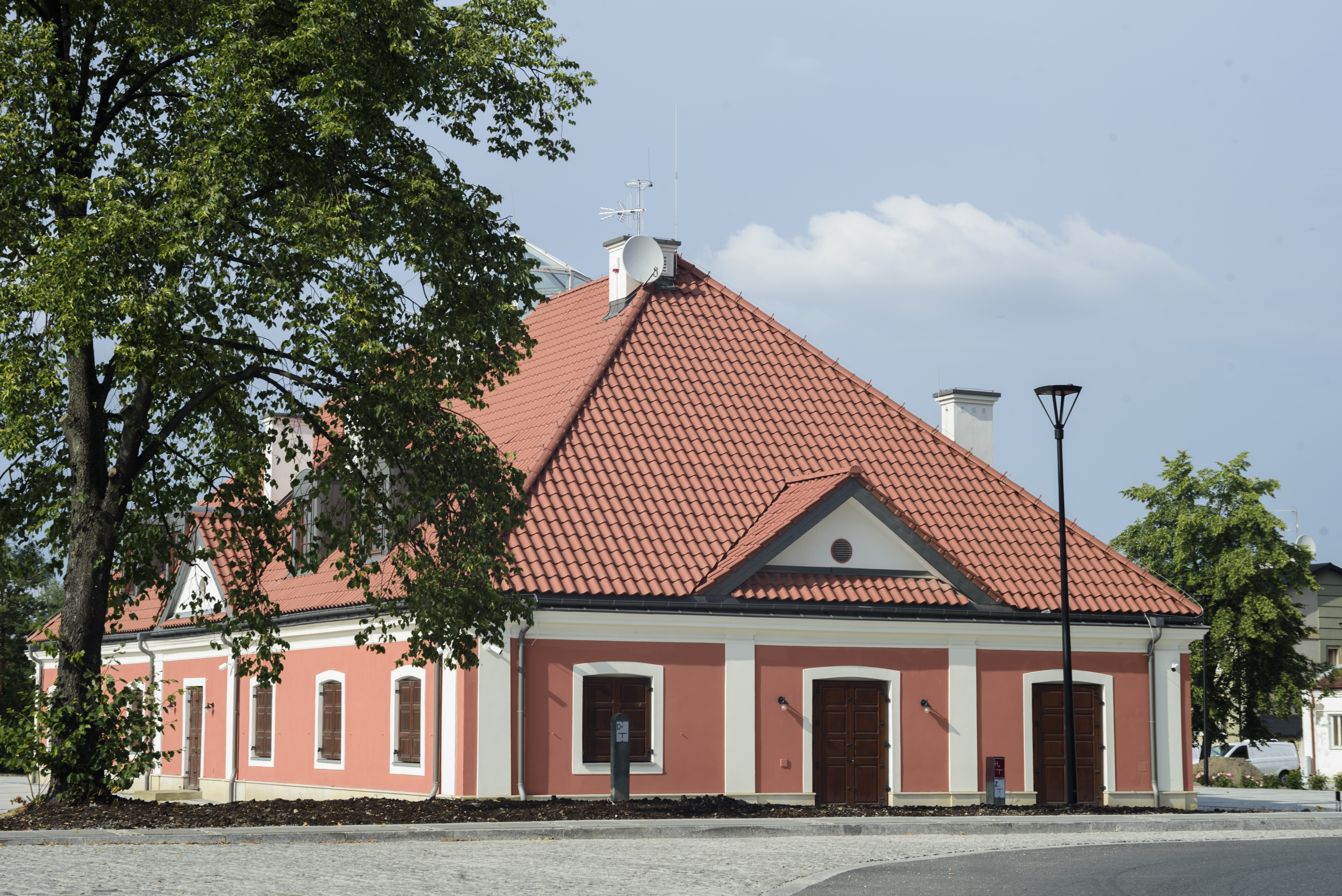
Historic town hall

The village was founded probably in the 14th century, under the name Witowska Wola. The name was later changed to Konińskawola, and in the 19th century adjusted to its present form. As a private town, Końskowola served as a marketplace for trade of farm produce for the surrounding area.

On June 8, 1532, the town was incorporated. Several textile production factories were built. Many people immigrated to work there from other parts of Poland and elsewhere; among them many immigrants from Saxony. The town shared the history of the entire region. After the Third Partition of Poland, in 1795, it was annexed by Austria. After the Polish victory in the Austro-Polish War of 1809, it became part of the short-lived Duchy of Warsaw, only to become part of Russian-controlled Congress Poland in 1815. After the January Uprising, in 1870 it lost its town charter. During the Russian Revolution of 1905, many demonstrations and strikes of solidarity were organized there. Since 1918, the town remained in sovereign Poland.

=== World War II ===
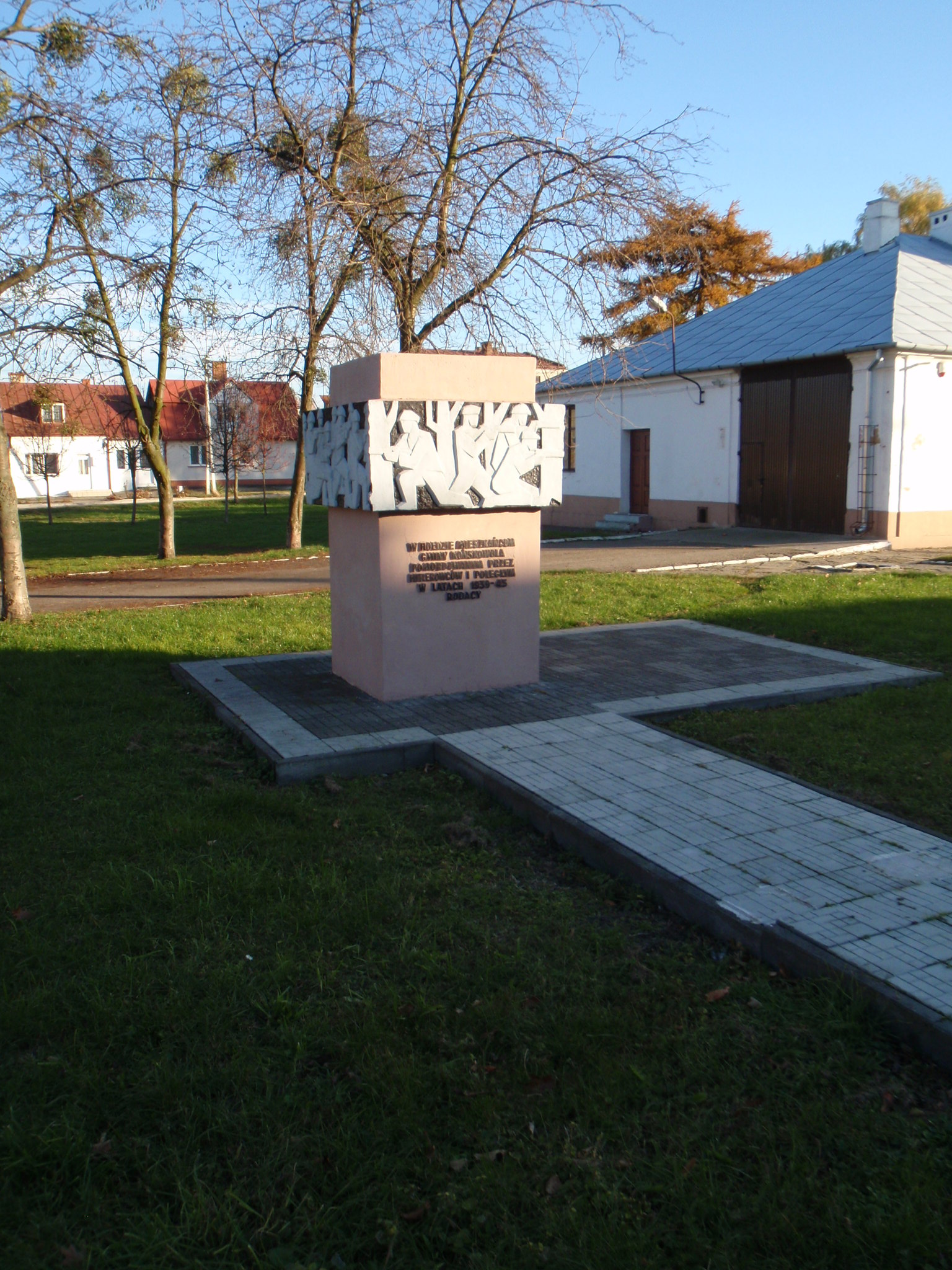
Memorial to victims of German occupation

With the onset of the Second World War, Końskowola was overrun by the German troops on September 15, 1939. In the course of the occupation of Poland, the Germans set up a prisoner-of-war camp and a slave labour camp in the town. The POW camp was soon liquidated, but a labour camp continued to operate through 1943. The inmates worked for Germans-run farms, and on construction sites of roads and railroads.

A Nazi ghetto was established in the town, to which many groups of Jews were relocated, including Jews expelled from Slovakia. On May 8, 1942, the Nazis conducted an Aktion in which many Jews were rounded up and transported to the Sobibór extermination camp. In October 1942, the ghetto' population was liquidated. In a massacre carried out by German troops: the Reserve Police Battalion 101, some 800–1000 Jews, among them women and children, were taken to a nearby forest and slaughtered. The ghetto's remaining inhabitants were transferred to another camp.

With the approach of Red Army forces in the summer of 1944, the Germans had plans to burn the town. On July 25, 1944, the German occupation forces were engaged in battle by fighters of the Polish underground Armia Krajowa, joined by Polish partisans of the Bataliony Chłopskie. With the arrival of Soviet Red Army troops, the combined antifascist combatants succeeded in securing the area's liberation.

== Tourism ==
Among the notable points of interest in Końskowola is a Catholic church pw. Znalezienia Krzyża (The Finding of the Holy Cross), restored c. 1670 in a Baroque architectural project by Tylman van Gameren. The renovation, which included the new graves of the Opaliński and Lubomirski families was commissioned by Stanisław Lubomirski. There is also another old Catholic church, built in 1613 in the "Lublin Renaissance" architectural style, whose finest exemplars are this church in Konskowola and one in Kazimierz Dolny. There are also the remains of a Lutheran cemetery.

Końskowola is also known as the place of death of the Polish poets Franciszek Dionizy Kniaźnin and Franciszek Zabłocki. Henryk Sienkiewicz, a famous Polish novelist and Nobel prize winner, author of historical novel With Fire and Sword included a critical mention of "... Very poor beer also in this Końskowola, Mr. Zagłoba noticed ..."

The two historic churches of Końskowola
Interior of Church pw. Znalezienia Krzyża	Church pw. Znalezienia Krzyża by Tylman van Gameren	The Feast of the Cross church panorama	High Pulpit at Church pw. Znalezienia Krzyża
St. Anna's Church; Front elevation	St. Anna's church in Końskowola	Saint Anne Church front elevation	Chapel near St. Anna's
