= Gmina Goraj =

Gmina Goraj Goraj Commune
- Gmina
- Coat of arms
- Interactive map of Gmina Goraj
- Coordinates (Goraj): 50°43′N 22°39′E
- Country: Poland
- Voivodeship: Lublin
- County: Biłgoraj
- Seat: Goraj

Area
  - Total: 67.87 km^{2} (26.20 sq mi)

Population (2006)
  - Total: 4,439
  - Density: 65.40/km^{2} (169.4/sq mi)

Gmina Goraj is an urban-rural gmina (administrative district) in Biłgoraj County, Lublin Voivodeship, in eastern Poland. Its seat is the town of Goraj, which lies approximately 20 kilometres (12 mi) north of Biłgoraj and 60 km (37 mi) south of the regional capital Lublin.

The gmina covers an area of 67.87 square kilometres (26.2 sq mi), and as of 2006 its total population is 4,439.

== Villages ==
Apart from the town of Goraj, Gmina Goraj contains the villages and settlements of Abramów, Albinów Duży, Albinów Mały, Gilów, Hosznia Abramowska, Hosznia Ordynacka, Jędrzejówka, Kondraty, Majdan Abramowski, Średniówka, Zagrody and Zastawie.

== Neighbouring gminas ==
Gmina Goraj is bordered by the gminas of Chrzanów, Dzwola, Frampol, Radecznica and Turobin.
