= Gmina Końskowola =

Gmina Końskowola Końskowola Commune
- Gmina
- Coat of arms
- Interactive map of Gmina Końskowola
- Coordinates (Końskowola): 51°25′N 22°3′E
- Country: Poland
- Voivodeship: Lublin
- County: Puławy
- Seat: Końskowola

Area
  - Total: 89.63 km^{2} (34.61 sq mi)

Population (2015)
  - Total: 8,955
  - Density: 99.91/km^{2} (258.8/sq mi)
- Website: http://www.konskowola.info.pl

Gmina Końskowola is a rural gmina (administrative district) in Puławy County, Lublin Voivodeship, in eastern Poland. Its seat is the village of Końskowola, which lies approximately 6 kilometres (4 mi) east of Puławy and 41 km (25 mi) north-west of the regional capital Lublin.

The gmina covers an area of 89.63 square kilometres (34.6 sq mi), and as of 2006 its total population is 9,050 (8,955 in 2015).

== Villages ==
Gmina Końskowola contains the villages and settlements of Chrząchów, Chrząchówek, Końskowola, Las Stocki, Młynki, Nowy Pożóg, Opoka, Pulki, Rudy, Sielce, Skowieszyn, Stara Wieś, Stary Pożóg, Stok, Witowice and Wronów.

== Neighbouring gminas ==
Gmina Końskowola is bordered by the town of Puławy and by the gminas of Kazimierz Dolny, Kurów, Wąwolnica and Żyrzyn.
