= Leśce =

- Village
- Location within Poland
- Coordinates: 51°21′N 22°24′E
- Country: Poland
- Voivodeship: Lublin
- County: Lublin
- Gmina: Garbów

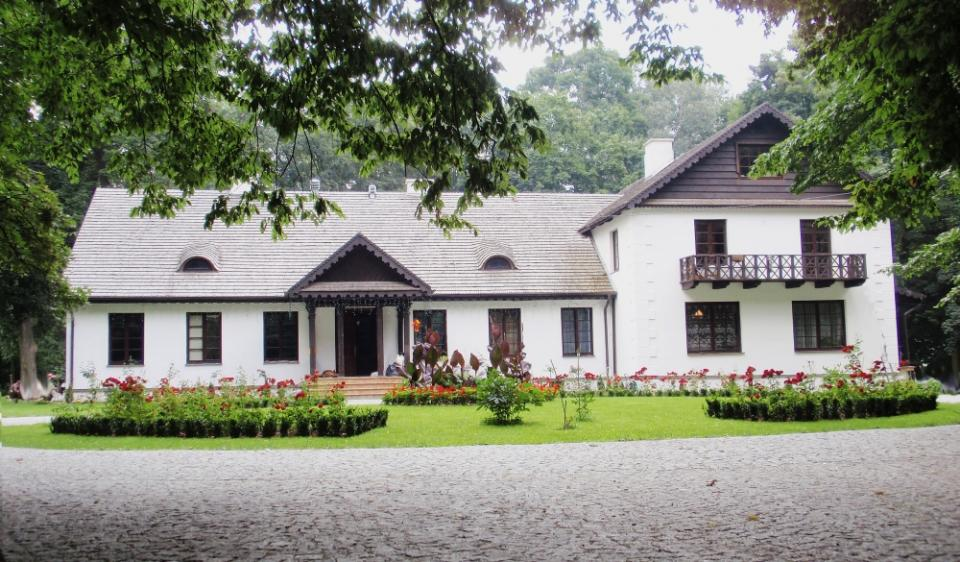
Manor in Leśce

Leśce [ˈlɛɕt͡sɛ] is a village in the administrative district of Gmina Garbów, within Lublin County, Lublin Voivodeship, in eastern Poland.
