= Gmina Garbów =

Gmina Garbów Garbów Commune
- Gmina
- Coat of arms

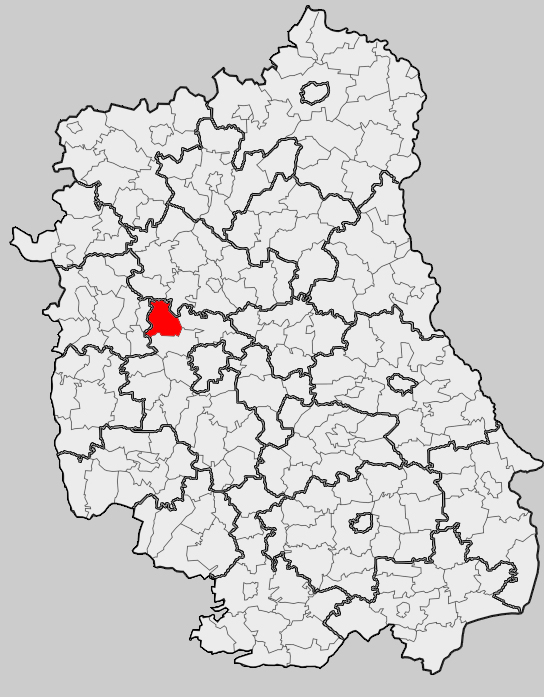
- Location within the county and voivodeship
- Coordinates (Garbów): 51°21′1″N 22°20′24″E
- Country: Poland
- Voivodeship: Lublin
- County: Lublin County
- Seat: Garbów

Area
  - Total: 102.42 km^{2} (39.54 sq mi)

Population (2019)
  - Total: 9,063
  - Density: 88.49/km^{2} (229.2/sq mi)
- Website: garbow.ug.gov.pl

Gmina Garbów is a rural gmina (administrative district) in Lublin County, Lublin Voivodeship, in eastern Poland. Its seat is the village of Garbów, which lies approximately 20 kilometres (12 mi) north-west of the regional capital Lublin.

The gmina covers an area of 102.42 square kilometres (39.5 sq mi), and as of 2019 its total population is 9,063 (8,917 in 2013).

== Neighbouring gminas ==
Gmina Garbów is bordered by the gminas of Abramów, Jastków, Kamionka, Markuszów, Nałęczów and Niemce.

== Villages ==
The gmina contains the following villages with the status of sołectwo: Bogucin, Borków, Garbów (divided into two sołectwos: Garbów I and Garbów II), Gutanów, Janów, Karolin, Leśce, Meszno, Piotrowice-Kolonia, Piotrowice Wielkie, Przybysławice, Wola Przybysławska (divided into two sołectwos: Wola Przybysławska I and Wola Przybysławska II), and Zagrody.
