= Chrząchów =

- Village
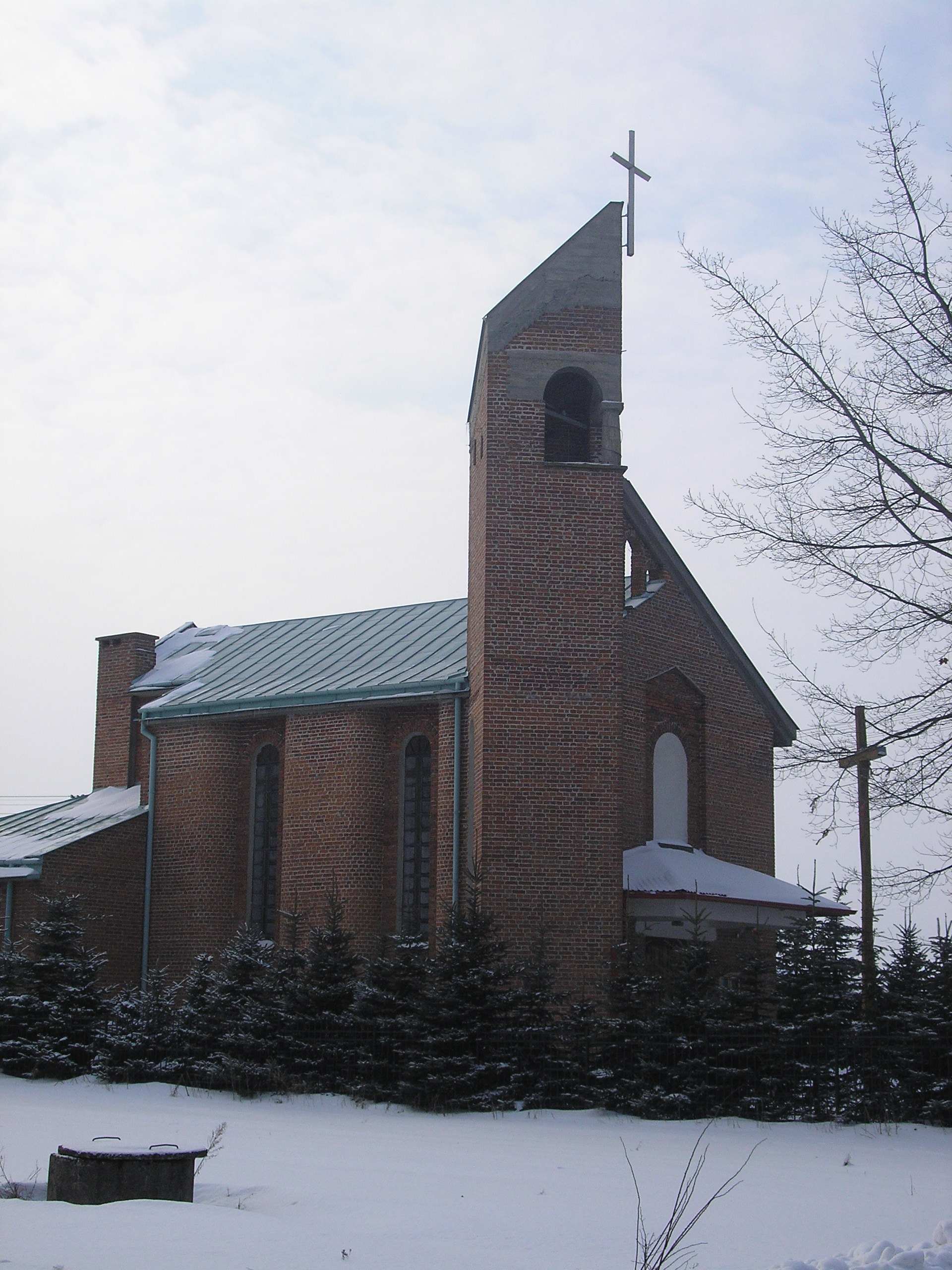
- Church in Chrząchów

- Location within Poland
- Coordinates: 51°25′N 22°7′E
- Country: Poland
- Voivodeship: Lublin
- County: Puławy
- Gmina: Końskowola
- Established: 15th century
- Elevation: 180.2 m (591 ft)
- Population: 736
- Postal code: 24-130

Chrząchów [ˈxʂɔ̃xuf] is a village in the administrative district of Gmina Końskowola, within Puławy County, Lublin Voivodeship, in eastern Poland. In 2004 the village had a population of 736.

There are about 160 small farms and houses, a small Roman Catholic church, fire brigade, elementary school and two shops.

== Name ==
According to local legend, the name of this village came from the sound of wild boars, but alternatively it may have come from:

1. the name of an inhabitant or owner, or
2. bushes, shrubs (Polish krzaki, local informal dialect krzoki).

In the old Polish language, k and ch were often written and spoken alternatively (for example chrzcić and krzcić = to baptize). In an old document the name of the village was written Krzochów.

== History ==
- Around 1430 it was mentioned for the first time. Since then it shared the history of the whole region. After the Partitions of Poland, in 1795, it became part of Austria. In 1809 it became part of the Duchy of Warsaw, only to become part of the Kingdom of Poland in 1815.
- Until 1831 it was a private village, a possession of Polish nobles.
- In 1827 there were 45 houses and 335 inhabitants, and in 1866 there were 70 houses.
- During World War I, Austro-Hungarian troops completely burnt the village.
- At the beginning of World War II, on September 10, 1939, the village was bombed by German Luftwaffe, although there were no troops nor military targets there; several persons were killed.
- During the war many people joined the resistance movement (Bataliony Chłopskie).
