= Goraj, Lublin Voivodeship =

Goraj
- Town
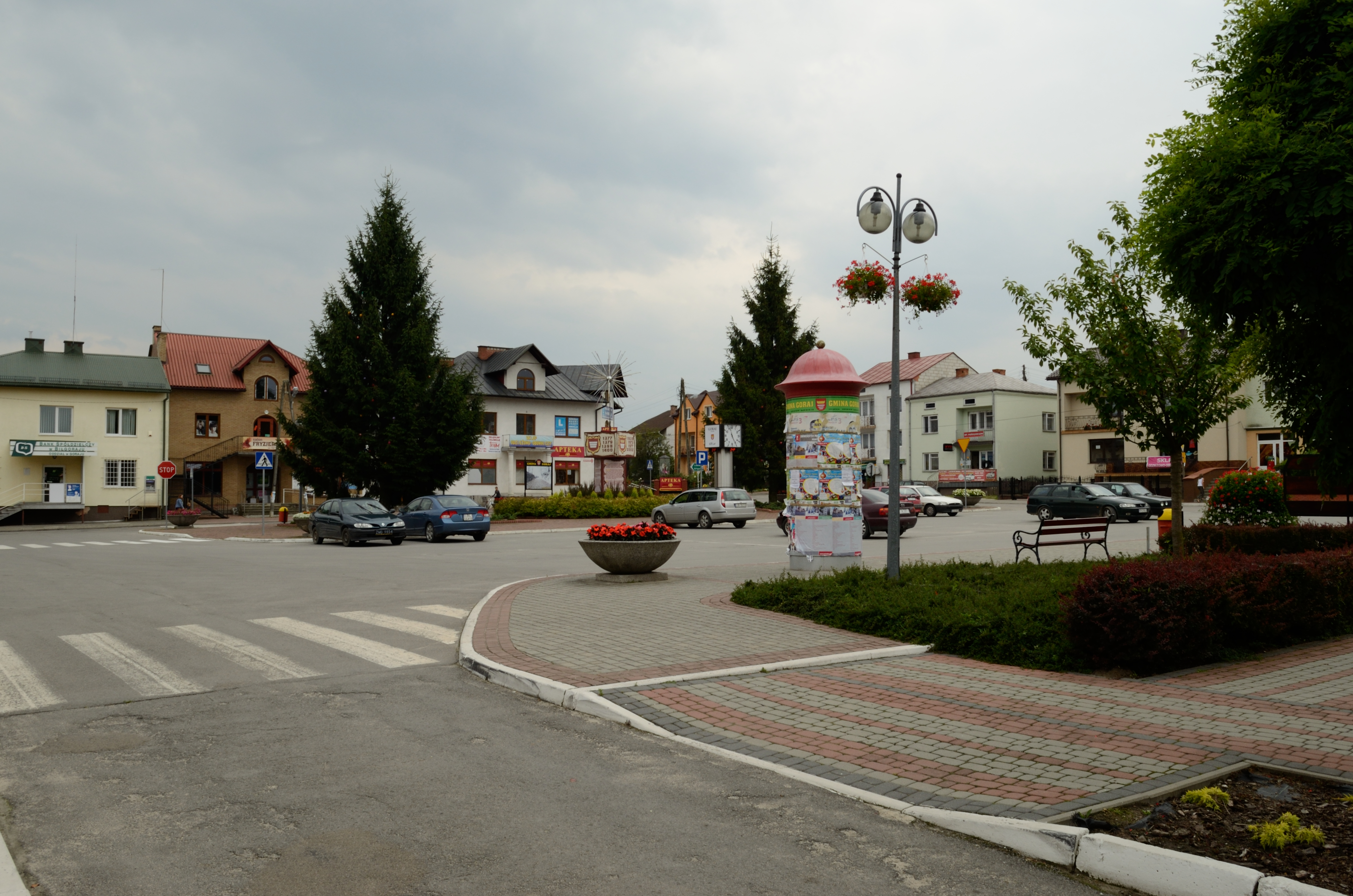
- Town square

- Coat of arms

- Location within Poland
- Coordinates: 50°43′N 22°39′E
- Country: Poland
- Voivodeship: Lublin
- County: Biłgoraj
- Gmina: Goraj

Population
  - Total: 1,048
- Time zone: UTC+1 (CET)
  - Summer (DST): UTC+2 (CEST)
- Vehicle registration: LBL

Goraj [ˈɡɔrai̯] is a town in Biłgoraj County, Lublin Voivodeship, in south-eastern Poland. It is the seat of the gmina (administrative district) called Gmina Goraj. The town has a population of 1,048.

== History ==
The name of the town probably comes from the Polish language word gora ('mountain'), and is related to the location of Goraj, among the hills of the Roztocze. In a 1377, Goray. The document was issued by King Louis I, mentions that two members of local nobility, were granted "castrum nostrum Goray alio Lada... cum villis Lada, Radziecin...". The medieval Goray Castle, which was also called Lada Castle, probably was surrounded by a village, where servants and artisans dwelled. It is not known when the village was granted Magdeburg rights, it probably happened in the early 1370s, as in a 1373 document, a person named Demetrio de Goray is mentioned, which suggests that it already was a town in that year. In 1389, King Władysław II Jagiełło confirmed Goraj's charter. Until 1508, the town belonged to the Gorajski family, and in the 16th century, it was property of several noble families – the Firlejs, the Sienienskis, the Trojanowskis, and in 1595, it was purchased by one of the most powerful magnates in the Polish–Lithuanian Commonwealth, Jan Zamoyski, who in 1596 incorporated Goraj into his landed property, Ordynacja Zamojska (Zamość Estate).

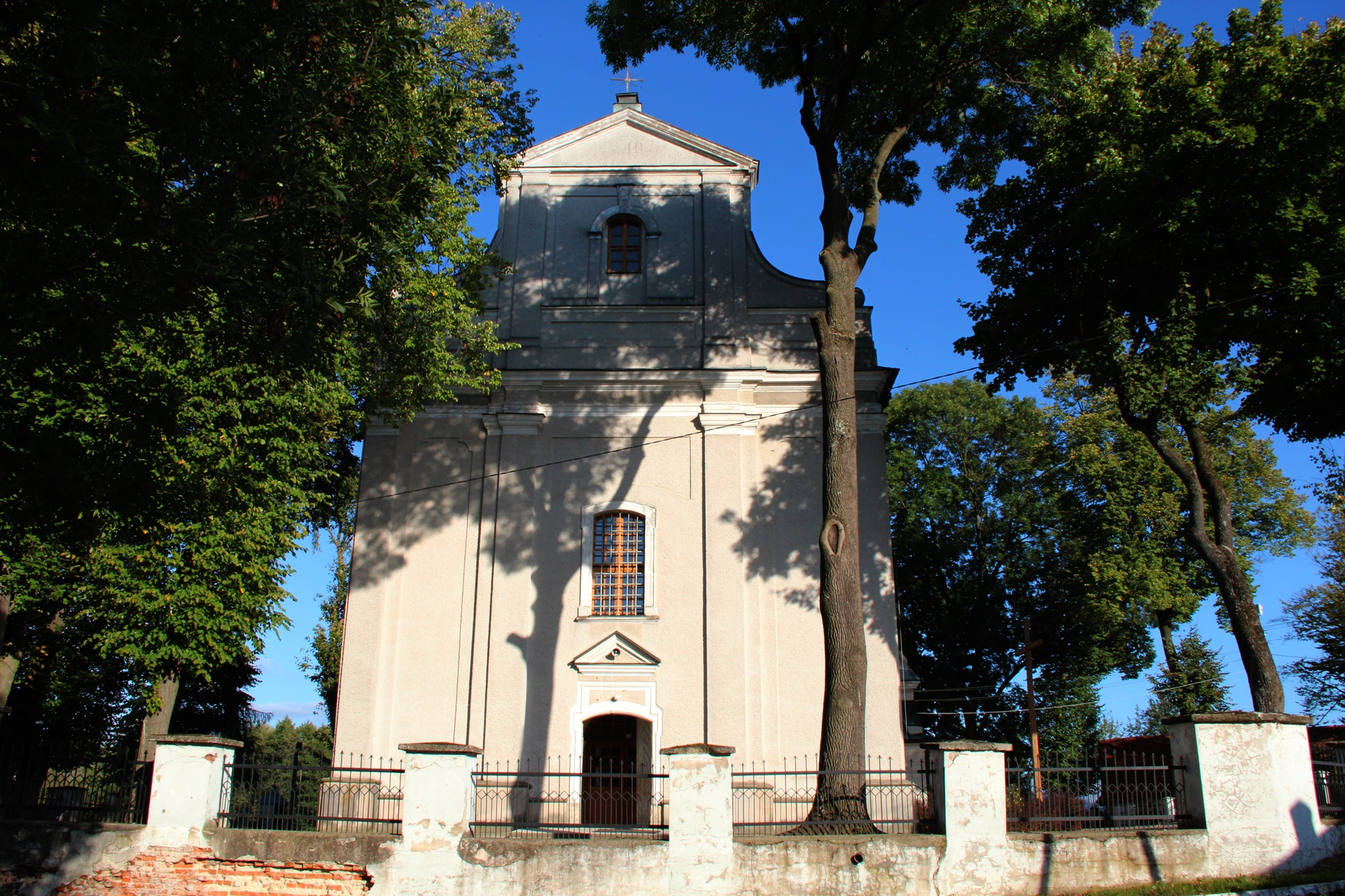
Baroque Saint Bartholomew church

In 1540, a Calvinist prayer house was built at Goraj. It remained in use until ca. 1625, and in 1561, the town received permission to build butcher shops and a town hall. In the same year, Goraj burned in a large fire. In 1648, the town was ransacked and destroyed by Cossacks and Tatars in the Khmelnytsky Uprising, it also suffered during the Swedish invasion of Poland (1655–1660), when, among other buildings, a local parish church was destroyed. By that time, Goraj already had a Jewish community, with a stone synagogue, built probably in the late 17th century, and destroyed by the Germans in World War II.

Following the Third Partition of Poland, Goraj, which for centuries belonged to Lesser Poland's Lublin Voivodeship, was annexed by the Habsburg Empire (1795). After the Polish victory in the Austro-Polish War of 1809, it became part of the short-lived Duchy of Warsaw, and in 1815 it became part of Russian-controlled Congress Poland. In the 19th century, almost all buildings were made of wood, except for the parish church and the synagogue. In 1855, the population was decimated by a cholera epidemic. During the January Uprising, Polish residents of the town supported the rebels, for which in 1869 Russian authorities stripped it of the town charter.

Goraj was almost completely destroyed in World War I, and in the Second Polish Republic, it belonged to Lublin Voivodeship, as a poor village without prospects and industry. According to the 1921 census, the town had a population of 2,331, of which 98,9% declared Polish nationality and 1.1% declared Jewish nationality.

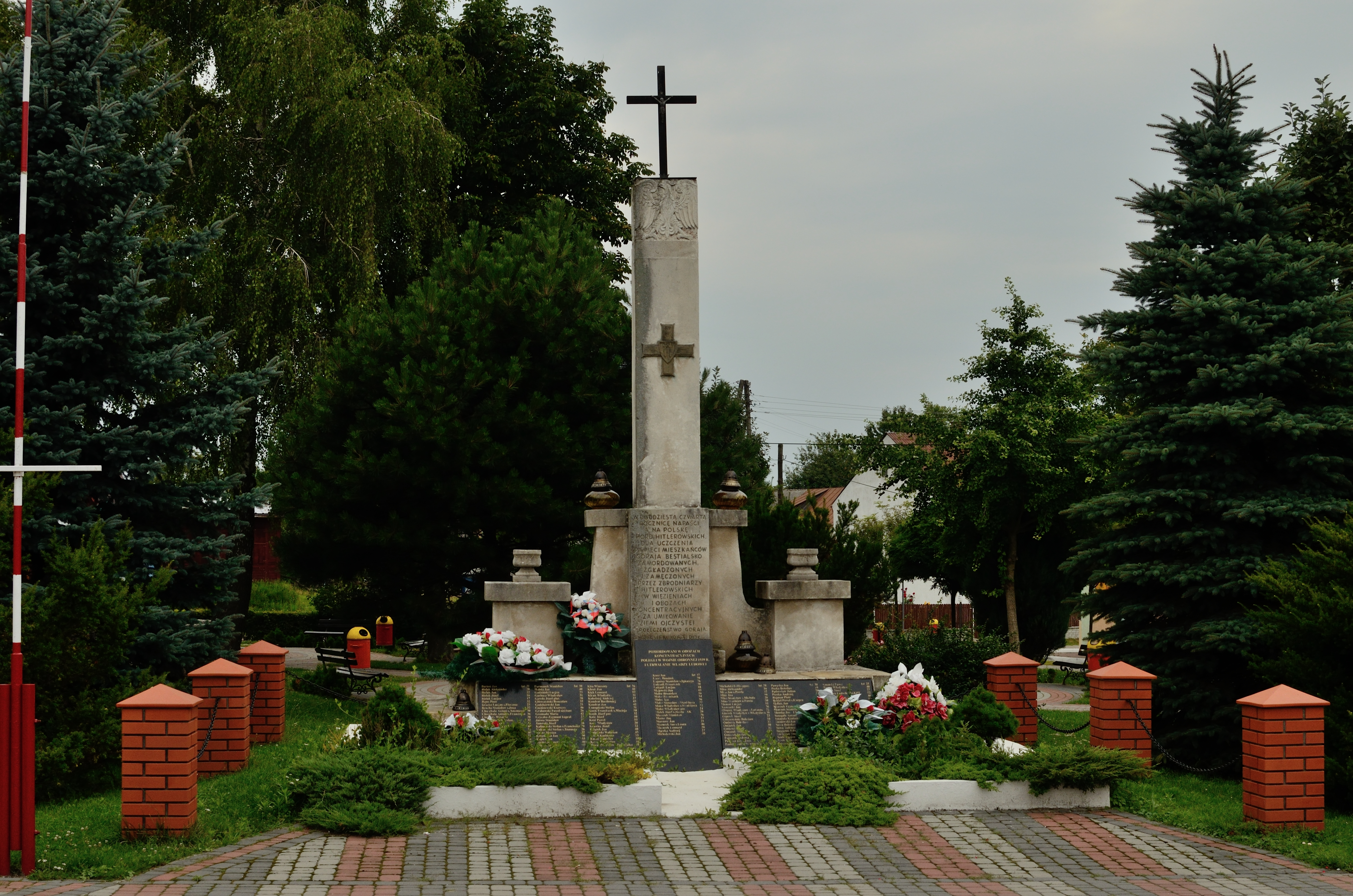
Memorial to local victims of German occupation during World War II

World War II brought further destruction, as Goraj was burned by the Germans twice – during the Zamość Uprising (September 26, 1942), and in July 1944, during the Operation Tempest. As a result, there are few historic building in the village, with the exception of the parish church (1779–1782), its bell tower (1782), and two 18th-century wooden houses.

Town rights were restored in 2021.

== Notable residents ==
Rabbi Menachem Mendel Morgensztern, famed as the Kotsker Rebbe, was born in Goraj.

== In popular culture ==
Isaac Bashevis Singer's debut novel Satan in Goray is set in the town in the 17th century.
