= Coat of arms of Lublin =

Crest of Lublin

Coat of arms of Lublin

The Lublin coat of arms is one of the city symbols of Lublin, Poland. The coat of arms was established by the Lublin City Council on 8 July 2004.

The coat of arms depicts a silver goat with golden corrugated horns and golden hooves, placed in a red field facing to the right, climbing from green grass to a green wine bush.

== Symbols ==
The goat and the vine were attributes of the goddess Venus (which means the fertility of nature), from whom Julia (according to a legend quoted by Wincenty Kadłubek), the founder of the city, originated. The goat is also a symbol of love and Christ. The red background symbolizes strength and power.

== History ==
The oldest image of the Lublin coat of arms comes from a document dated 1401 with the seal of the Lublin City Council. The document itself probably dates back to the 14th century.
