= Piotrków =

Piotrków may refer to the following places in Poland:

== Populated places ==
- Piotrków Borowski
- Piotrków Drugi, a village in Gmina Jabłonna
- Piotrków-Kolonia, a village in Gmina Jabłonna
- Piotrków Kujawski, a city in Gmina Piotrków Kujawski in Radziejów County, Kuyavian-Pomeranian Voivodeship
- Piotrków Pierwszy, a village in Gmina Jabłonna in Lublin County, Lublin Voivodeship
- Piotrków Trybunalski, a city in Piotrków County (and formerly in Piotrków Voivodeship), Poland

== Subdivisions ==
- Piotrków Voivodeship, a former administrative division in Poland (1975-1998)
- Piotrków County, an administrative division in Poland
- Piotrków Governorate
