= Chmiel =

Chmiel is a Polish surname and toponym, meaning hops. It may refer to:

== People with the surname ==
- Chmiel (surname), a list of people with the surname

== Places ==
- Chmiel, Bieszczady County, a village in Bieszczady County
- Chmiel Drugi, a village in Lublin County
- Chmiel Pierwszy, a village in Lublin County
- Chmiel-Kolonia, a village in Lublin County
