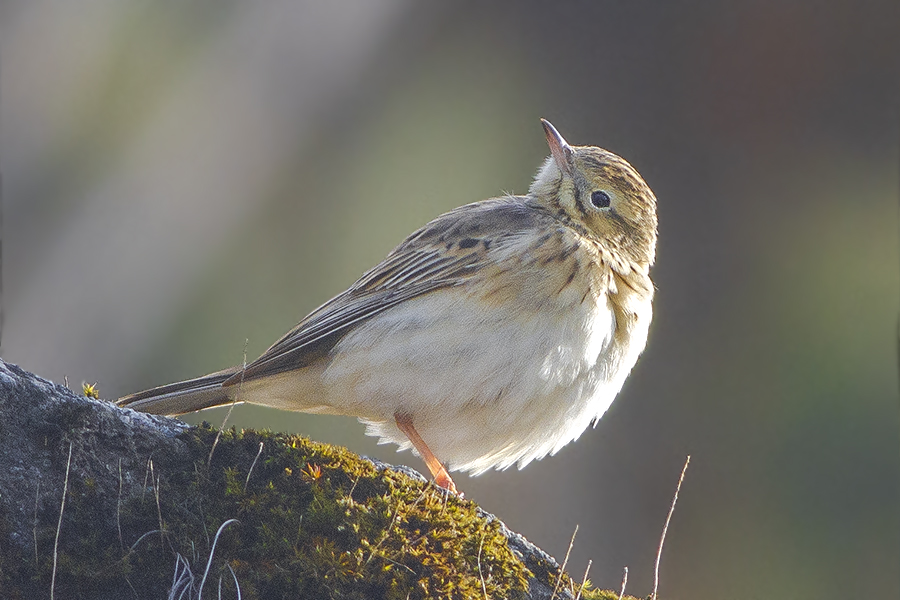
- From Pangolakha Wildlife Sanctuary in East Sikkim, India

Conservation status
- Least Concern (IUCN 3.1)

Scientific classification
- Kingdom: Animalia
- Phylum: Chordata
- Class: Aves
- Order: Passeriformes
- Family: Motacillidae
- Genus: Anthus
- Species: A. godlewskii

Binomial name
- Anthus godlewskii (Taczanowski, 1876)

= Blyth's pipit =

Species of bird

Blyth's pipit (Anthus godlewskii) is a medium-sized passerine bird which breeds in Mongolia and neighbouring areas of China, Tibet and India . It is a long distance migrant moving to open lowlands in Southern Asia. It is a very rare vagrant to western Europe.

This is a large pipit, but is an undistinguished looking species on the ground, mainly brown above and pale below. It is very similar to Richard's pipit, but is slightly smaller, shorter legs and a shorter dark bill. Its flight is strong and direct, and it gives a characteristic "pshee" call, higher pitched than Richard's.

In south Asia, in winter some care must be taken to distinguish this from other large pipits which winter or are resident in the area, including Richard's. This species is insectivorous.

This bird was named after the English zoologist Edward Blyth. The genus name Anthus is the Latin name for a small bird of grasslands. The specific godlewskii commemorates Polish nobleman and field naturalist Victor Godlewski.

== Gallery ==
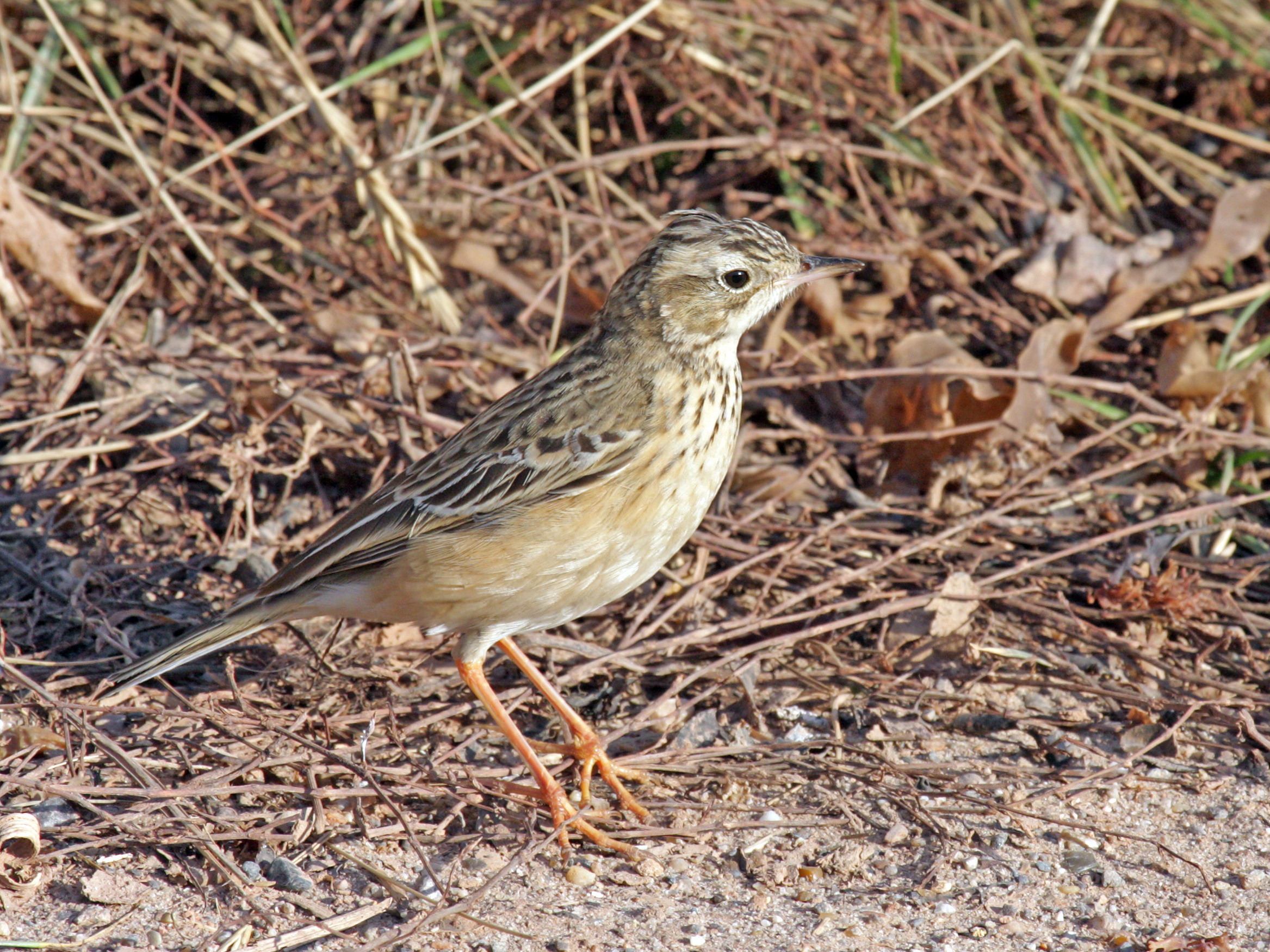
Blyth's pipit

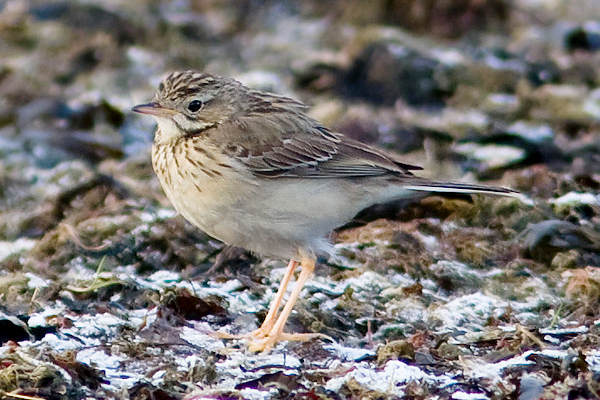
First winter plumage.

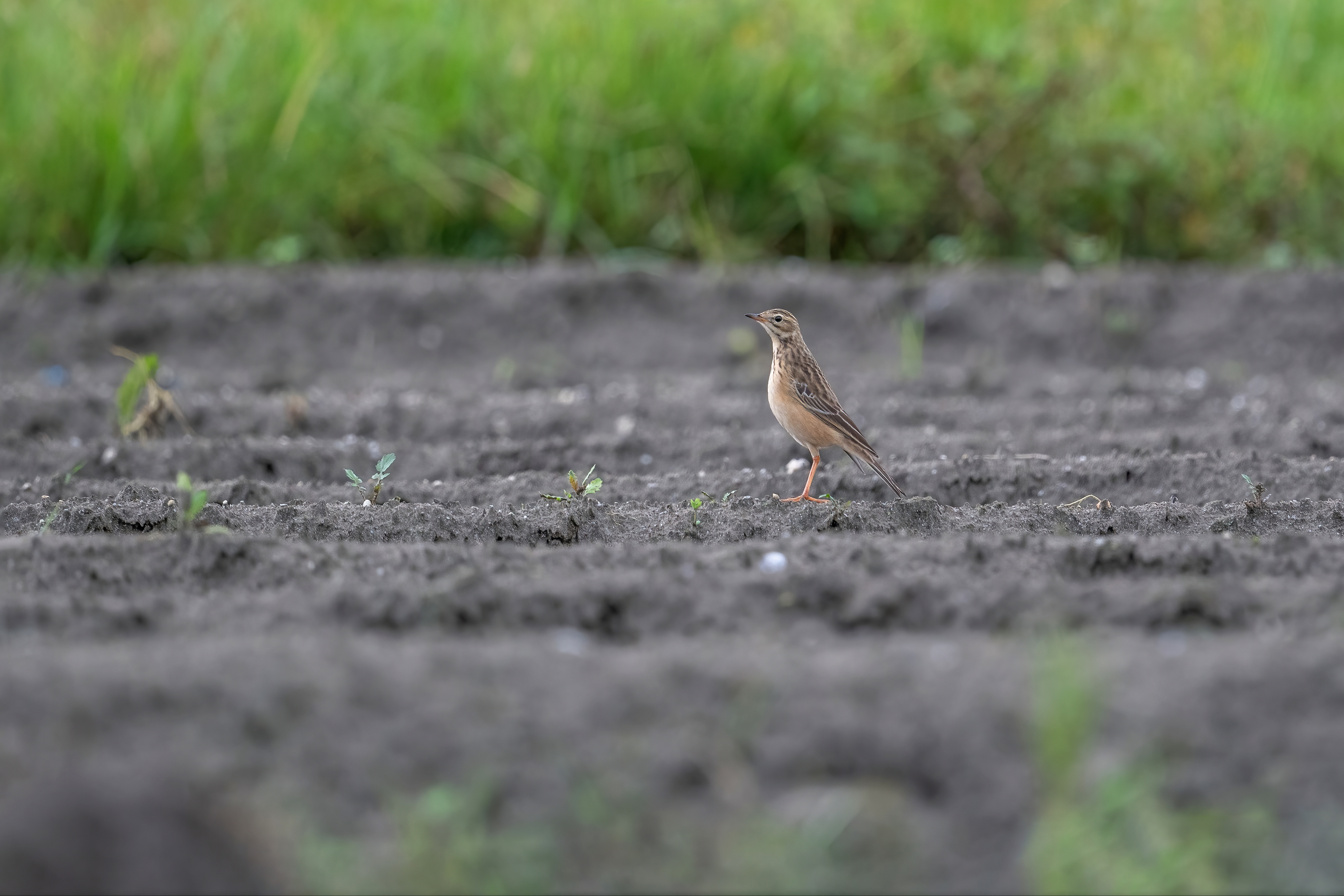
At Manohara River, Kathmandu Valley, Nepal
