= Chmielnicki =

Chmielnicki may refer to:

- Bohdan Khmelnytsky (c. 1595 – 1657), Ukrainian head of state and military commander
- Khmelnytsky Uprising, a Cossack rebellion within the Polish-Lithuanian Commonwealth in 1648–1657 led by Bohdan Khmelnytsky
- Khmelnytskyi, Ukraine, a city in central Ukraine
- Khmelnytsky (disambiguation)
