= Scoloderus =

Scientific classification
- Kingdom: Animalia
- Phylum: Arthropoda
- Subphylum: Chelicerata
- Class: Arachnida
- Order: Araneae
- Infraorder: Araneomorphae
- Family: Araneidae
- Genus: Scoloderus; Simon, 1887

Type species
- S. cordatus (Taczanowski, 1879)

Species
- 5, see text

Genus of spiders

Scoloderus is a genus of orb-weaver spiders first described by Eugène Simon in 1887. They primarily feed on nocturnal moths using a ladder-type nest, featuring vertical extensions of sticky orbs above and below the circumference of the primary orb. When a moth strikes the web, it slides down the ladder, leaving behind scales on the sticky silk until it is completely ensnared.

== Species ==
As of April 2019 it contains five species:

- Scoloderus ackerlyi Traw, 1996 – Belize
- Scoloderus cordatus (Taczanowski, 1879) (type) – Mexico to Argentina
- Scoloderus gibber (O. Pickard-Cambridge, 1898) – Mexico to Argentina
- Scoloderus nigriceps (O. Pickard-Cambridge, 1895) – USA, Mexico, Bahama Is., Cuba, Jamaica
- Scoloderus tuberculifer (O. Pickard-Cambridge, 1889) – USA to Argentina
