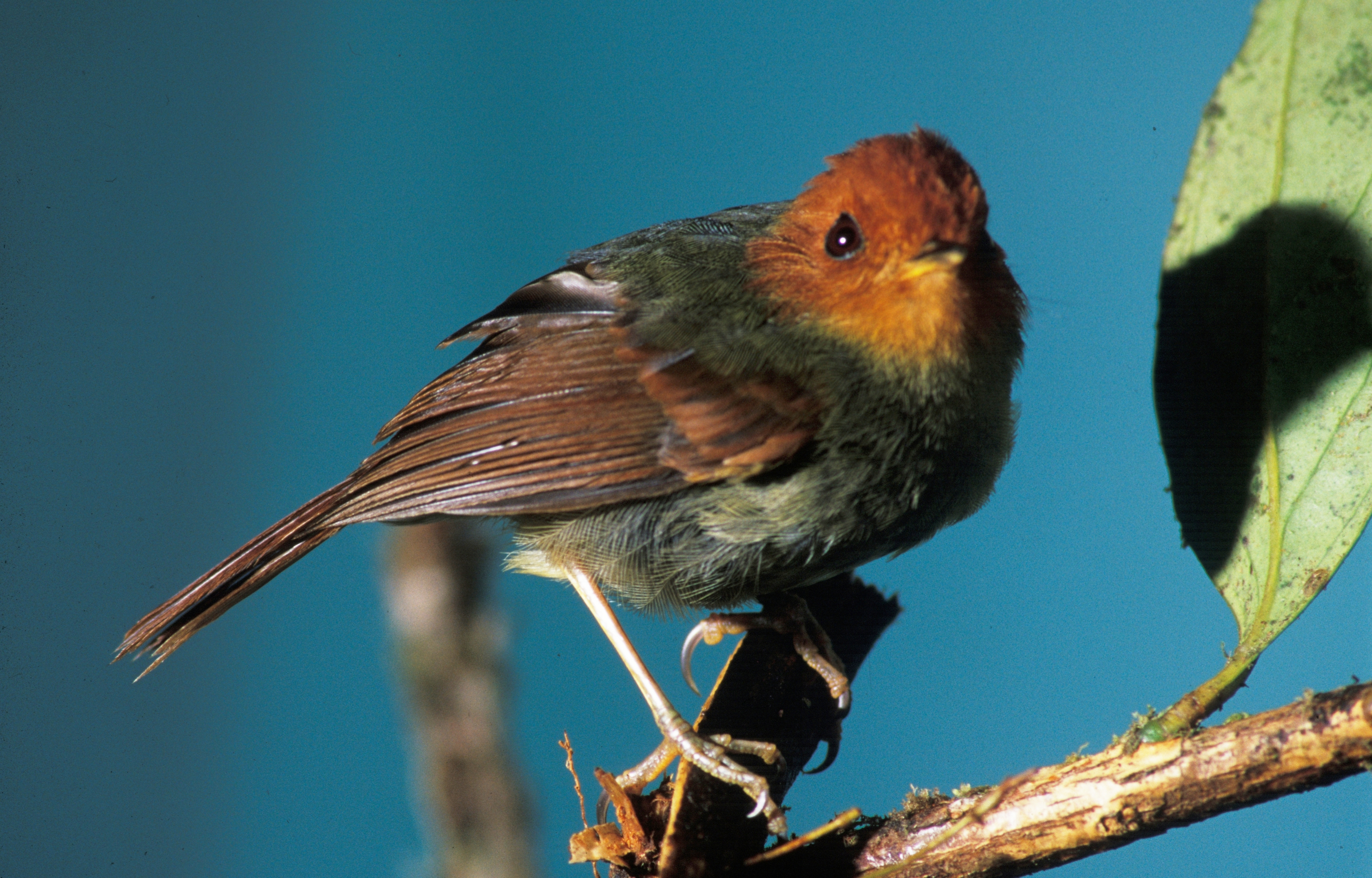
- Rufous-headed pygmy tyrant (Pseudotriccus ruficeps)

Scientific classification
- Kingdom: Animalia
- Phylum: Chordata
- Class: Aves
- Order: Passeriformes
- Family: Tyrannidae
- Genus: Pseudotriccus; Taczanowski & Berlepsch, 1885

Type species
- Pseudotriccus pelzelni Taczanowski & von Berlepsch, 1885

= Pseudotriccus =

Genus of birds

Pseudotriccus is a genus of birds in the tyrant flycatcher family Tyrannidae. They are found in the undergrowth of Andean forests.

== Species ==
It contains three species:

Image	Scientific name	Common name	Distribution
	Pseudotriccus pelzelni	Bronze-olive pygmy tyrant	Colombia, Ecuador, Panama, and Peru
	Pseudotriccus ruficeps	Rufous-headed pygmy tyrant	Bolivia, Colombia, Ecuador, and Peru
	Pseudotriccus simplex	Hazel-fronted pygmy tyrant	Bolivia and Peru.
