= Chmielnik =

Chmielnik may refer to:

- Chmielnik, Lublin Voivodeship, in east Poland
- Chmielnik, Masovian Voivodeship, in east-central Poland
- Chmielnik, Opole Voivodeship, in south-west Poland
- Chmielnik, Podlaskie Voivodeship, in north-east Poland
- Chmielnik, Podkarpackie Voivodeship, in south-east Poland
  - Gmina Chmielnik, Podkarpackie Voivodeship, the gmina administrative district
- Chmielnik, Świętokrzyskie Voivodeship, in central Poland
- Chmielnik, Warmian-Masurian Voivodeship, in north Poland
- Chmielnik (Włodzickie Hills), a hill in Lower Silesian Voivodeship
- Polish name for Khmilnyk in Ukraine

== See also ==
- Chmiel (disambiguation)
- Chmielno (disambiguation)
