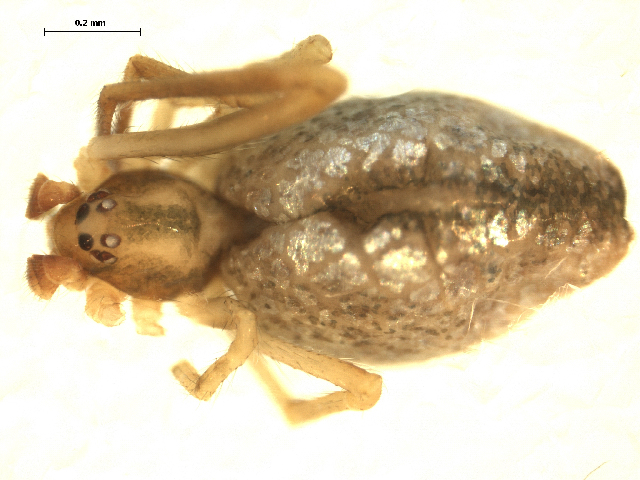
- N. trigonum, male

Scientific classification
- Kingdom: Animalia
- Phylum: Arthropoda
- Subphylum: Chelicerata
- Class: Arachnida
- Order: Araneae
- Infraorder: Araneomorphae
- Family: Theridiidae
- Genus: Neospintharus; Exline, 1950

Type species
- N. parvus Exline, 1950

Species
- 13, see text

= Neospintharus =

Genus of spiders

Neospintharus is a genus of comb-footed spiders that was first described by H. Exline in 1950. It was synonymized with Argyrodes in 1962, but revalidated in 2004.

== Species ==
As of September 2019 it contains thirteen species, found in the Caribbean, South America, Central America, Asia, Mexico, Turkey, the United States, and Canada:

- Neospintharus baboquivari (Exline & Levi, 1962) – USA, Mexico
- Neospintharus baekamensis Seo, 2010 – Korea
- Neospintharus bicornis (O. Pickard-Cambridge, 1880) – Brazil
- Neospintharus concisus (Exline & Levi, 1962) – Mexico
- Neospintharus fur (Bösenberg & Strand, 1906) – China, Korea, Japan
- Neospintharus furcatus (O. Pickard-Cambridge, 1894) – USA to El Salvador, Caribbean
- Neospintharus nipponicus (Kumada, 1990) – China, Korea, Japan
- Neospintharus obscurus (Keyserling, 1884) – Peru
- Neospintharus parvus Exline, 1950 (type) – Panama to Ecuador
- Neospintharus rioensis (Exline & Levi, 1962) – Brazil, Argentina
- Neospintharus syriacus (O. Pickard-Cambridge, 1872) – Turkey, Lebanon, Israel
- Neospintharus triangularis (Taczanowski, 1873) – Panama, French Guiana
- Neospintharus trigonum (Hentz, 1850) – USA, Canada

In synonymy:

- N. bifissus (F. O. Pickard-Cambridge, 1902) = Neospintharus furcatus (O. Pickard-Cambridge, 1894)
- N. frontatus (Banks, 1908) = Neospintharus furcatus (O. Pickard-Cambridge, 1894)
- N. gansuensis (Zhu, 1998) = Neospintharus fur (Bösenberg & Strand, 1906)
- N. montanus (Keyserling, 1884) = Neospintharus obscurus (Keyserling, 1884)
