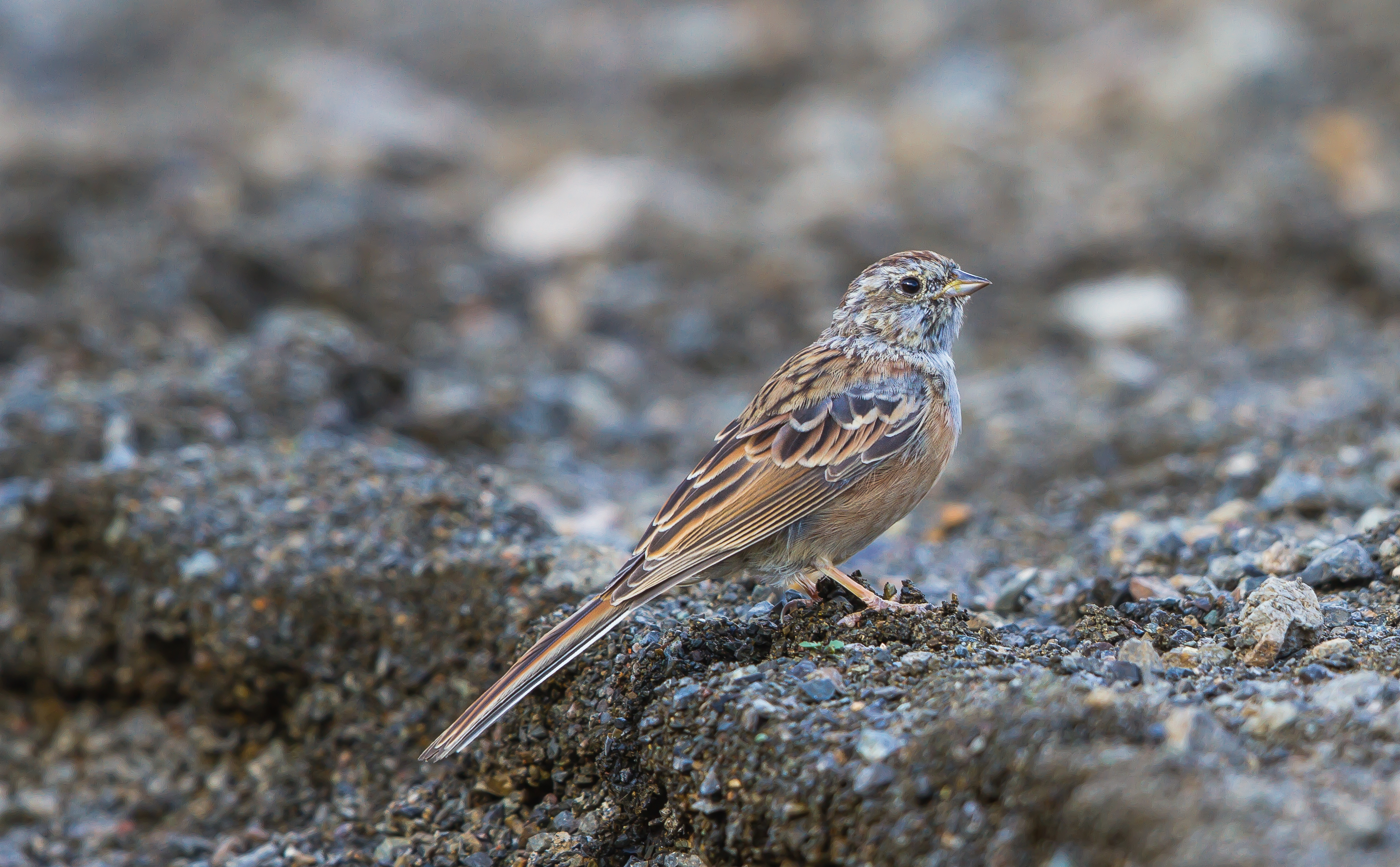

Conservation status
- Least Concern (IUCN 3.1)

Scientific classification
- Kingdom: Animalia
- Phylum: Chordata
- Class: Aves
- Order: Passeriformes
- Family: Emberizidae
- Genus: Emberiza
- Species: E. godlewskii

Binomial name
- Emberiza godlewskii Taczanowski, 1874

= Godlewski's bunting =

Species of bird

Godlewski's bunting (Emberiza godlewskii) is a species of bird in the family Emberizidae. It is named after the Polish collector Victor Godlewski who obtained a specimen of which on the basis of which it was described by Taczanowski.

== Distribution and habitat ==
It is found in China, India, Pakistan, Myanmar, Kazakhstan, Mongolia, and Russia.

== Description ==
The adult's head, neck, and breast are grey over-all with a brown or black eye stripe, "mustache", and crown. Its underparts and rump are an orange/buff wash and its back is mottled orange and black. The tail is black and orange above and white beneath, with a definite notch at the end. It has a sparrow-like beak which is black above and pale below. The legs and feet are light pink.

== Habitat ==
Its natural habitat is temperate shrubland.
