= Wolnica =

Wolnica may refer to the following places:

- Wolnica, Lublin Voivodeship (east Poland)
- Wolnica, Lubusz Voivodeship (west Poland)
- Wolnica, Warmian-Masurian Voivodeship (north Poland)
