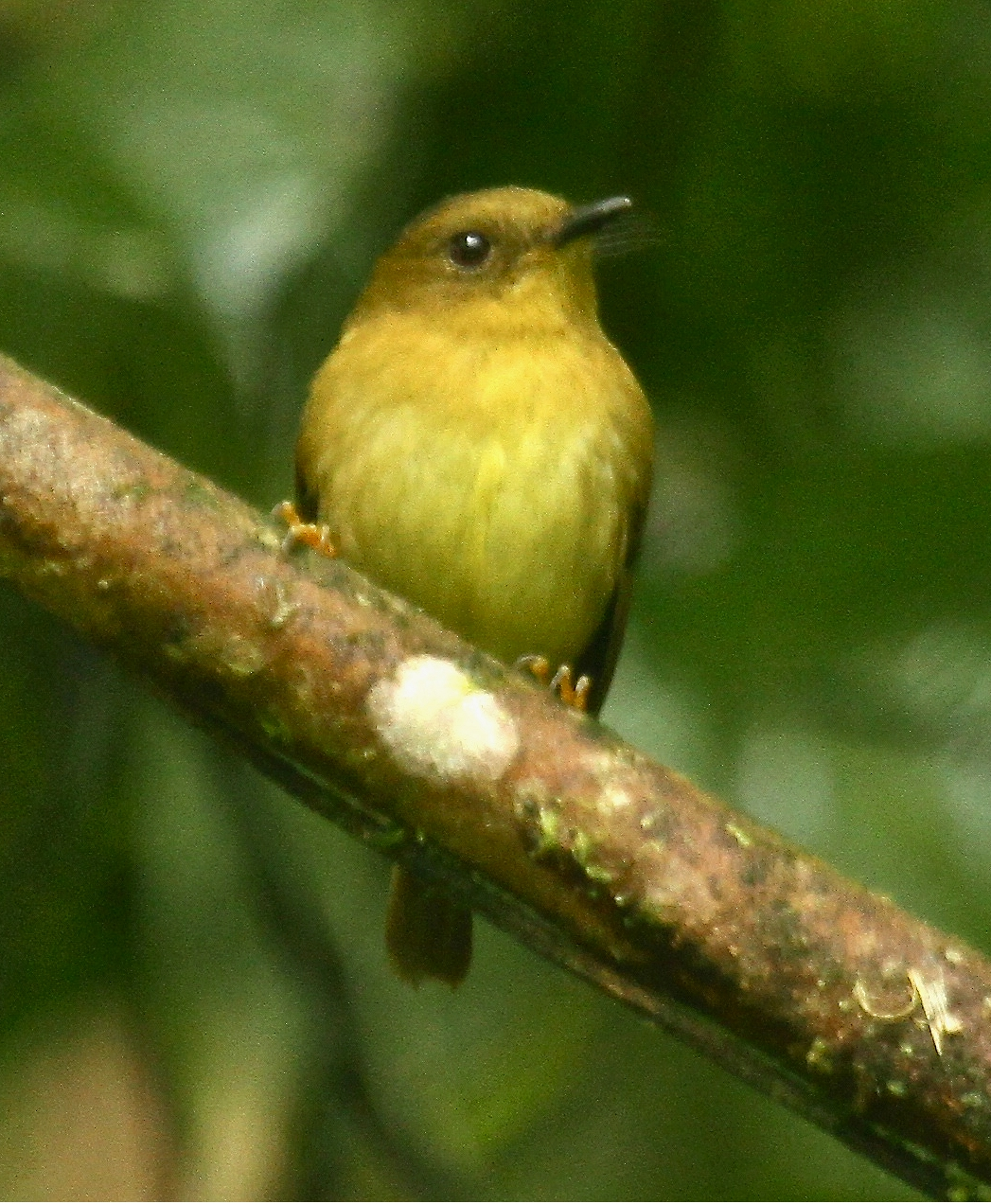

Conservation status
- Least Concern (IUCN 3.1)

Scientific classification
- Kingdom: Animalia
- Phylum: Chordata
- Class: Aves
- Order: Passeriformes
- Family: Tyrannidae
- Genus: Pseudotriccus
- Species: P. pelzelni

Binomial name
- Pseudotriccus pelzelni Taczanowski & Berlepsch, 1885

= Bronze-olive pygmy tyrant =

Species of bird

The bronze-olive pygmy tyrant (Pseudotriccus pelzelni) is a species of bird in the family Tyrannidae, the tyrant flycatchers. It is found in Colombia, Ecuador, Panama, and Peru.

== Taxonomy and systematics ==
The bronze-olive pygmy tyrant has these four subspecies:

- P. p. berlepschi Nelson, 1913
- P. p. annectens (Salvadori & Festa, 1899)
- P. p. pelzelni Taczanowski & Berlepsch, 1885
- P. p. peruvianus Bond, J, 1947

The bronze-olive pygmy tyrant and the hazel-fronted pygmy tyrant (P. simplex) form a superspecies and might be conspecific.

== Description ==
The bronze-olive pygmy tyrant is 11 to 11.5 cm (4.3 to 4.5 in) long and weighs 9 to 11 g (0.32 to 0.39 oz). The sexes have the same plumage. Adults of the nominate subspecies P. p. pelzelni have a mostly dark brownish-olive head, upperparts, and tail. Their crown is slightly darker than their back and has a bushy crest that is only rarely raised. Their wings are also dark brownish-olive, but with diffuse warmer brown edges to the coverts and inner flight feathers. Their chin and throat are creamy whitish, their breast and flanks olive, and their belly and undertail coverts creamy yellow.

Subspecies P. p. berlepschi has darker and browner upperparts and a blacker crown than the nominate. Its wing coverts have more conspicuous rufous-brown edges and its underparts are a paler yellow. P. p. annectens has more bronzy upperparts than the nominate and berlepschi. It has a greener crown than berlepschi, with bronze-tinged ear coverts and neck and brighter yellow underparts with a yellow cast on the flanks. P. p. peruvianus resembles the nominate but has more greenish and less brown upperparts and no brownish edges on the wing coverts. Both sexes of all subspecies have a dark red to reddish brown iris, a black bill, and gray legs and feet.

== Distribution and habitat ==
The bronze-olive pygmy tyrant has a disjunct distribution. Subspecies P. p. berlepschi is the northernmost. It is found on Cerro Pirre and Cerro Tacarcuna in extreme eastern Panama's Darién Province, in Colombia's Western Andes south to Valle del Cauca Department, and in the northern part of Colombia's Central Andes. P. p. annectens is found from Cauca Department in southwestern Colombia south through western Ecuador to El Oro Province. The nominate P. p. pelzelni is found in Colombia's Eastern Andes from Santander Department south along the eastern slope through Ecuador almost to Peru and perhaps slightly over the border. P. p. peruvianus is found intermittently along the eastern slope of the Peruvian Andes between Amazonas and Cuzco departments.

The bronze-olive pygmy tyrant inhabits the undergrowth of humid foothill and montane evergreen forest in the upper tropical and subtropical zones. In elevation it occurs between 1,250 and 1,500 m (4,100 and 4,900 ft) in Panama, 600 and 2,500 m (2,000 and 8,200 ft) in Colombia, mostly 600 and 2,000 m (2,000 and 6,600 ft) in Ecuador, and 1,100 and 2,100 m (3,600 and 6,900 ft) in Peru.

== Behavior ==
=== Movement ===
The bronze-olive pygmy tyrant is a year-round resident.

=== Feeding ===
The bronze-olive pygmy tyrant feeds on insects. It usually forages singly or in pairs and seldom joins mixed-species feeding flocks. It hunts near the ground in dense undergrowth, making short flights between perches, and jumping up from a perch to take prey from leaves and twigs with an audible snap of the bill.

=== Breeding ===
The bronze-olive pygmy tyrant's breeding season appears to include May in Colombia. Nothing else is known about the species' breeding biology.

=== Vocalization ===
The bronze-olive pygmy tyrant is not very vocal. It makes "a shrill and high-pitched 'preeeeeeee', sometimes with a separate higher note at end" and also a "drier descending trill".

== Status ==
The IUCN has assessed the bronze-olive pygmy tyrant as being of Least Concern. It has a very large range; its estimated population of at least 500,000 mature individuals is believed to be decreasing. No immediate threats have been identified. It is considered fairly common on the two mountains in Panama and in Colombia and Ecuador, and uncommon to fairly common in Peru. It occurs in several protected areas. However it is "[p]robably locally extinct in areas where deforestation has been intense, e.g. in Colombian Andes".
