= Sachalin (Piotrków Pierwszy) =

- Village
- Location within Poland
- Coordinates: 51°03′54″N 22°40′18″E
- Country: Poland
- Voivodeship: Lublin
- County: Lublin
- Gmina: Jabłonna

Sachalin is a hamlet of Piotrków Pierwszy, a village in the administrative district of Jabłonna, within Lublin County, Lublin Voivodeship, in eastern Poland.
