= Khmelnytsky (disambiguation) =

Khmelnytsky or variants may refer to:

== People ==
- Khmelnytskyi (surname), a surname of Ukrainian origin
- Bohdan Khmelnytsky, Cossack leader
  - Khmelnytsky Uprising, 1648-1657

== Places ==
- Khmelnytskyi, Ukraine, a city in western Ukraine
  - Khmelnytskyi Oblast
  - Khmelnytskyi Raion
- Pereiaslav-Khmelnytskyi Raion, Kyiv Oblast, Ukraine

== Ships ==
- Khmelnytsky, a Tarantul-class corvette of the Ukrainian Navy
- Soviet cruiser Chervona Ukraina, known as Hetman Bohdan Khmelnytsky 1918–1922

== Other ==
- Bohdan Khmelnytsky Battalion, an alleged Russian volunteer battalion
- Khmelnytskyi Nuclear Power Plant, Ukraine

== See also ==
- Chmielnik (disambiguation)
