= Skrzynice Pierwsze =

- Village
- Location within Poland
- Coordinates: 51°6′52″N 22°39′48″E
- Country: Poland
- Voivodeship: Lublin
- County: Lublin
- Gmina: Jabłonna

Population
  - Total: 280

Skrzynice Pierwsze [skʂɨˈnit͡sɛ ˈpjɛrfʂɛ] is a village in the administrative district of Gmina Jabłonna, within Lublin County, Lublin Voivodeship, in eastern Poland.
