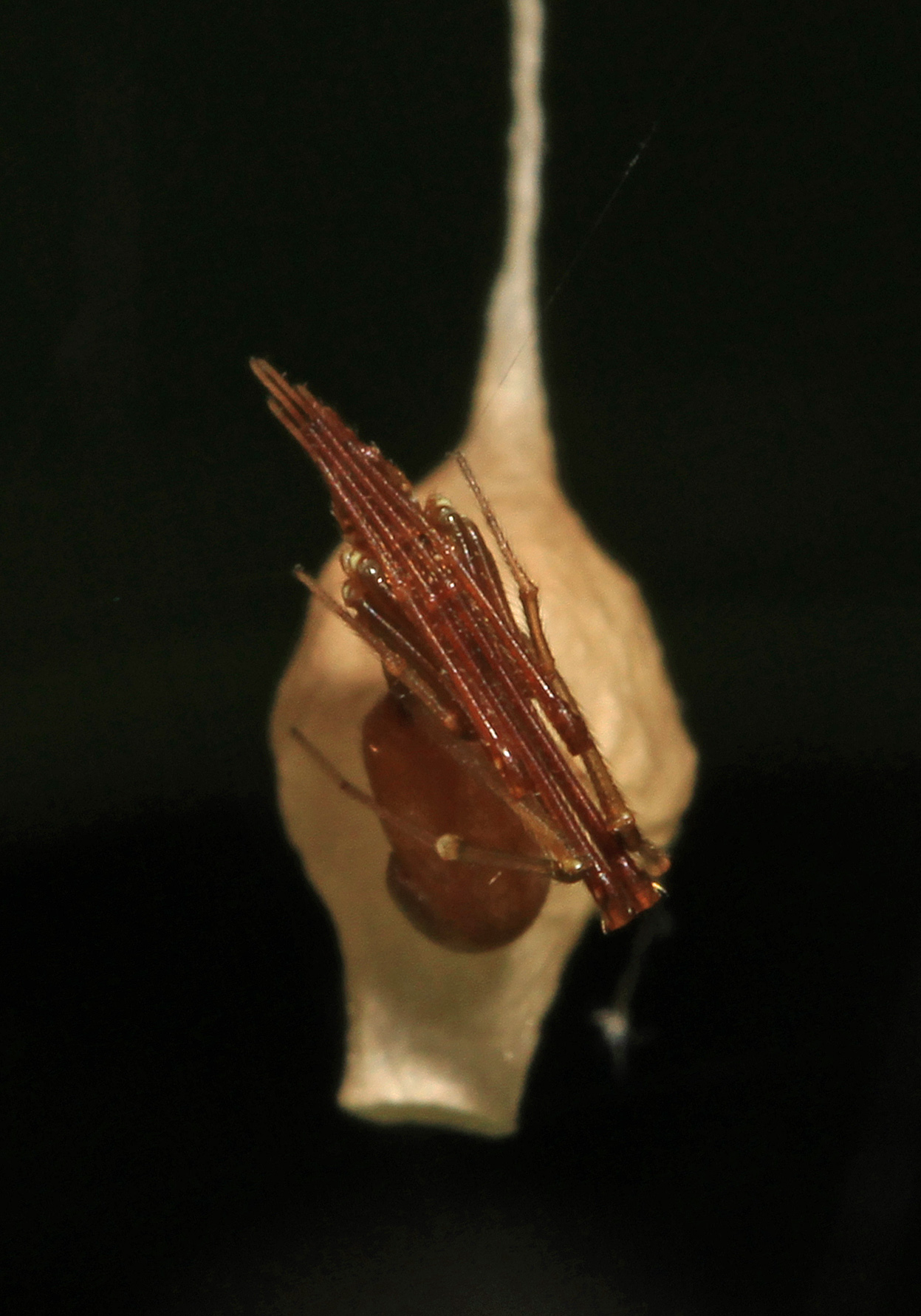

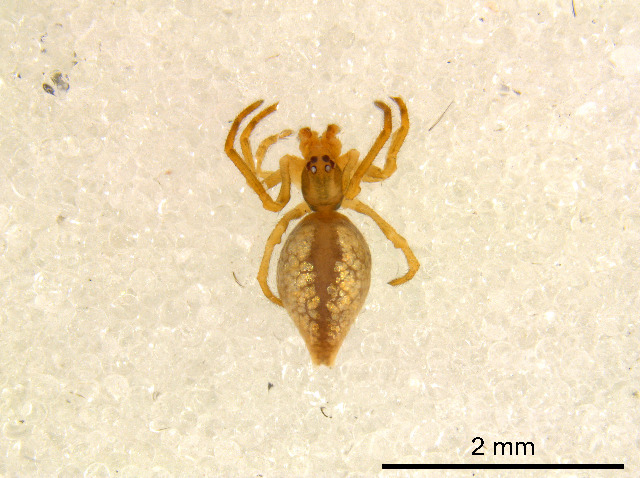
- N. trigonum

Scientific classification
- Domain: Eukaryota
- Kingdom: Animalia
- Phylum: Arthropoda
- Subphylum: Chelicerata
- Class: Arachnida
- Order: Araneae
- Infraorder: Araneomorphae
- Family: Theridiidae
- Genus: Neospintharus
- Species: N. trigonum

Binomial name
- Neospintharus trigonum (Hentz, 1850)

= Neospintharus trigonum =

Species of spider

Neospintharus trigonum is a species of cobweb spider in the family Theridiidae. It is found in the United States and Canada.

Females of produce clutches containing approximately 42 eggs. Each egg measures about 0.67 mm in diameter and weighs around 0.17 mg. The average female body mass is about 10.9 mg.

Gallery
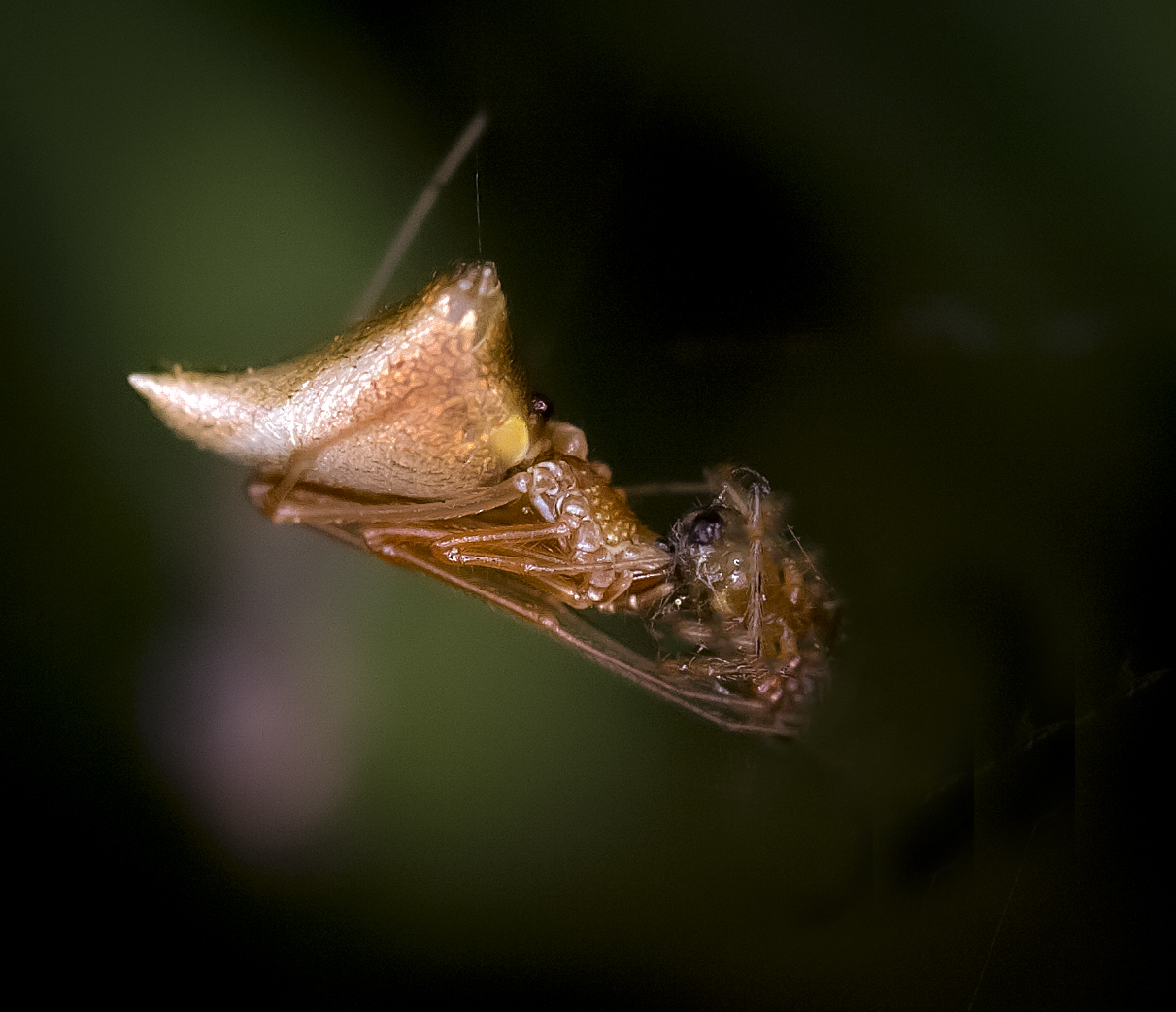
Eating meal

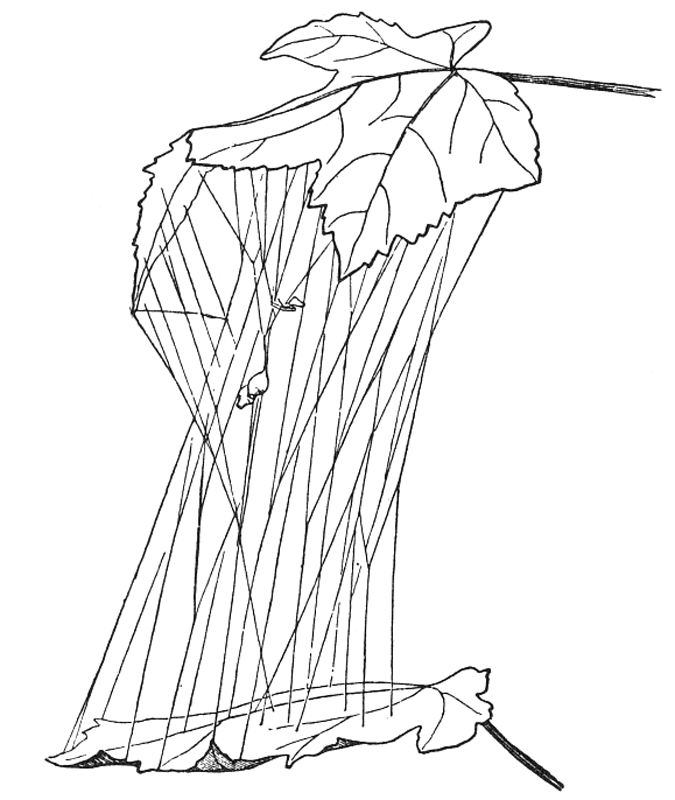
Write a caption here

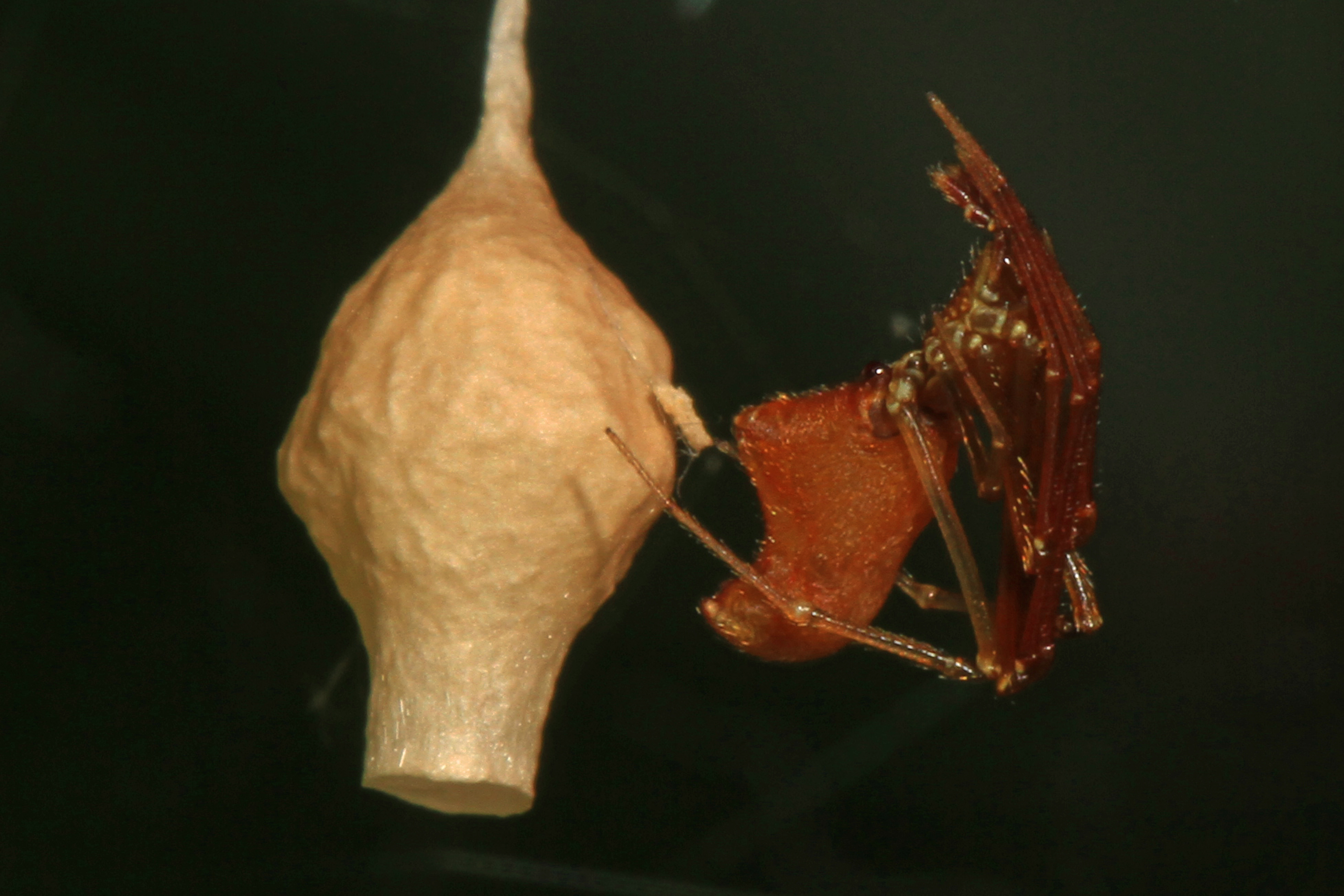
Write a caption here

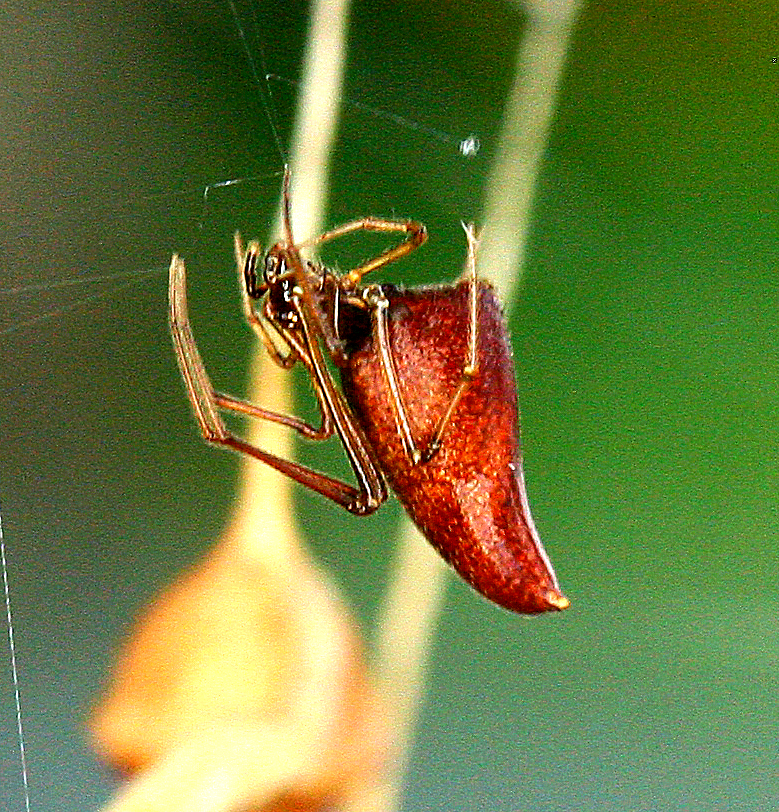
Drop Spider (Neospintharus trigonum)
