= Khmelnytskyi (surname) =

Khmelnytskyi (Ukrainian: Хмельницький) is a surname of Ukrainian origin often associated with the national hero of Ukraine Bohdan Khmelnytsky.

== Notable persons ==
- Bohdan Khmelnytsky, a Hetman of Zaporizhian Host
- Yurii Khmelnytsky, a Hetman of Zaporizhian Host (son of Bohdan Khmelnytsky)
- Tymofiy Khmelnytsky (Tymish), another son of Bohdan Khmelnytsky, a Moldavian military person.
- Efrosinia Yanenko-Khmelnytska, niece of Bohdan Khemlnytsky and wife of Hetman Petro Doroshenko.
- Yurii Khmelnytsky, a brother of Bohdan Khmelnytsky
- Vitaliy Khmelnytskyi, a Soviet footballer and coach from the Orikhiv Raion
- Boris Khmelnitsky, a Soviet actor
