= Hazel-fronted pygmy tyrant =

Conservation status
- Least Concern (IUCN 3.1)

Scientific classification
- Kingdom: Animalia
- Phylum: Chordata
- Class: Aves
- Order: Passeriformes
- Family: Tyrannidae
- Genus: Pseudotriccus
- Species: P. simplex

Binomial name
- Pseudotriccus simplex (Berlepsch, 1901)

Species of bird

The hazel-fronted pygmy tyrant (Pseudotriccus simplex) is a species of bird in the family Tyrannidae, the tyrant flycatchers. It is found in Bolivia and Peru.

== Taxonomy and systematics ==
The hazel-fronted pygmy tyrant is monotypic.

The hazel-fronted pygmy tyrant and the bronze-olive pygmy tyrant (P. pelzelni) form a superspecies and might be conspecific.

== Description ==
The hazel-fronted pygmy tyrant is 11 to 11.5 cm (4.3 to 4.5 in) long and weighs 9 to 11 g (0.32 to 0.39 oz). The sexes have the same plumage. Adults have a mostly dark brownish-olive head, upperparts, and tail. Their crown is slightly darker than their back and has a bushy crest that is only rarely raised. Their forecrown ("front") is bronzy; it and their lores, eye ring, and sides of the head have a strong rufous tinge. Their wings are also dark brownish-olive, but with diffuse warmer brown to rufous edges to the coverts and inner flight feathers. Their chin and throat are creamy whitish, their breast and flanks olive, and their belly and undertail coverts creamy yellow. Both sexes have a dark red to reddish brown iris, a black bill, and gray legs and feet. Juveniles have less rufous on their head and brighter yellow underparts than adults.

== Distribution and habitat ==
The hazel-fronted pygmy tyrant is found from Madre de Dios, Cuzco, and Puno departments in southeastern Peru into Bolivia's La Paz and Cochabamba departments. It inhabits the undergrowth of humid montane forest and cloudforest. In Peru it occurs between 1,000 and 2,000 m (3,300 and 6,600 ft) and reaches 2,100 m (6,900 ft) in Bolivia.

== Behavior ==
=== Movement ===
The hazel-fronted pygmy tyrant is a year-round resident.

=== Feeding ===
The hazel-fronted pygmy tyrant feeds on insects and other arthropods. It usually forages singly or in pairs. It hunts near the ground in dense undergrowth, making short flights between perches, and jumping up from a perch to take prey from leaves and twigs with an audible snap of the bill.

=== Breeding ===
The hazel-fronted pygmy tyrant's breeding season appears to include August and September in Peru. Nothing else is known about the species' breeding biology.

=== Vocalization ===
The hazel-fronted pygmy tyrant is not highly vocal. Its song is "a high, thin trill followed by a pair of trills that fall, then rise, ending with a hiccup: tsee? tseeeeu-tseee'ip". Its call is "a rising tssuuueee?" that sometimes is stuttered.

== Status ==
The IUCN has assessed the hazel-fronted pygmy tyrant as being of Least Concern. It has a large range; its population size is not known and is believed to be decreasing. No immediate threats have been identified. It is considered uncommon and not well known. It occurs in a few protected areas. However, "[f]orests in [the] lower Yungas of Peru and Bolivia have been extensively converted for agriculture, especially cultivation of cash crops such as coca and coffee".
