= Skrzynice-Kolonia =

- Village
- Location within Poland
- Coordinates: 51°6′36″N 22°37′30″E
- Country: Poland
- Voivodeship: Lublin
- County: Lublin
- Gmina: Jabłonna

Population
  - Total: 240
- Time zone: UTC+1 (CET)
  - Summer (DST): UTC+2 (CEST)
- Vehicle registration: LUB

Skrzynice-Kolonia [skʂɨˈnit͡sɛ kɔˈlɔɲa] is a village in the administrative district of Gmina Jabłonna, within Lublin County, Lublin Voivodeship, in eastern Poland.

== History ==
Following the joint German-Soviet invasion of Poland, which started World War II in September 1939, the village was occupied by Germany. In October 1943, the German police executed two people in Skrzynice-Kolonia. The victims were a 28-year-old Polish man and a Jew whom he had sheltered from the Holocaust.
