= Jabłonna-Majątek =

- Village
- Location within Poland
- Coordinates: 51°05′36″N 22°34′17″E
- Country: Poland
- Voivodeship: Lublin
- County: Lublin
- Gmina: Jabłonna

Jabłonna-Majątek [jaˈbwɔnna maˈjɔntɛk] is a village in the administrative district of Gmina Jabłonna, within Lublin County, Lublin Voivodeship, in eastern Poland.
