= Czerniejów, Gmina Jabłonna =

Czerniejów
- Village
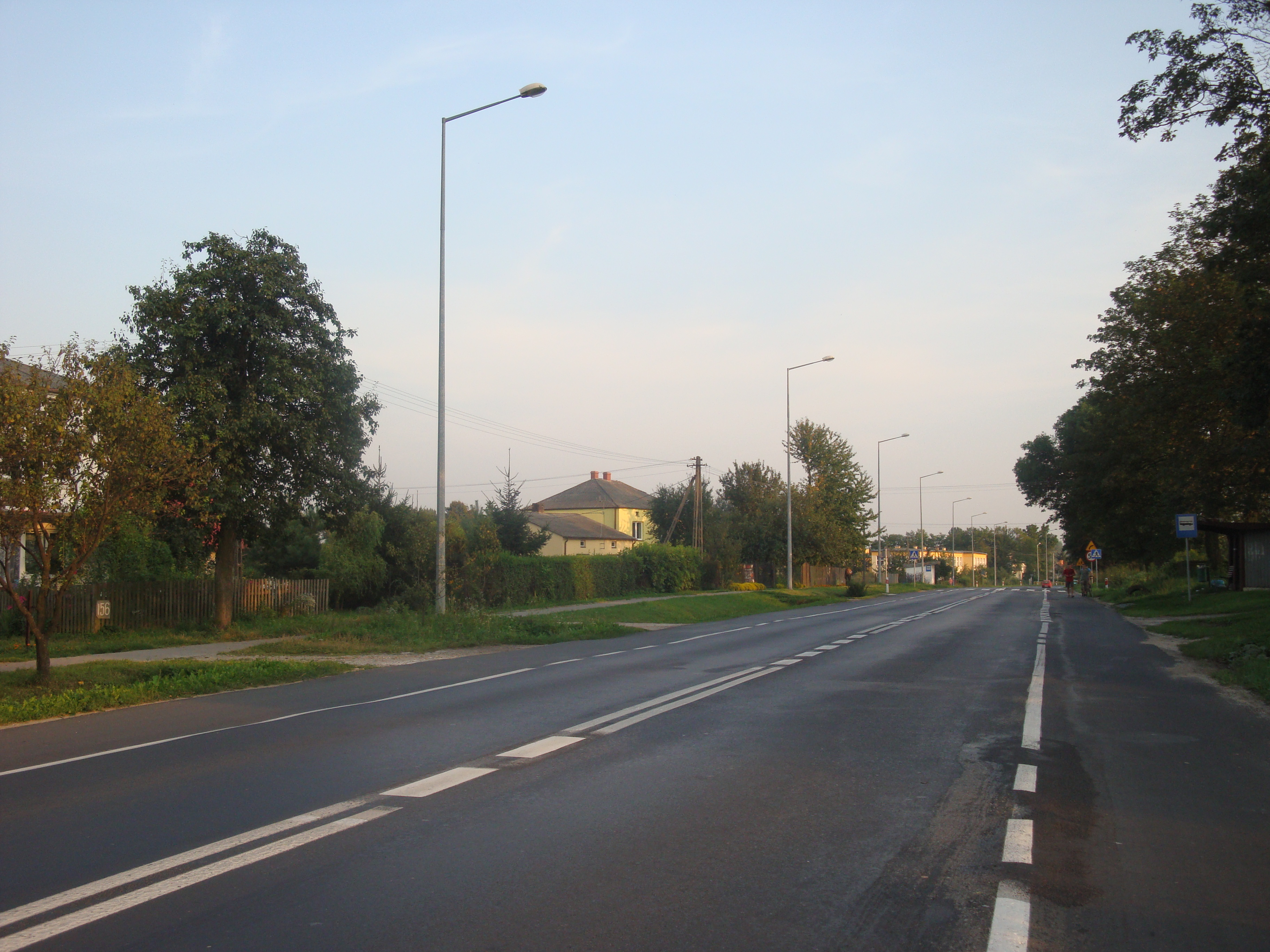
- Voivodeship road 835 in Czerniejów

- Location within Poland
- Coordinates: 51°7′16″N 22°35′59″E
- Country: Poland
- Voivodeship: Lublin
- County: Lublin
- Gmina: Jabłonna

Czerniejów [t͡ʂɛrˈɲɛjuf] is a village in the administrative district of Gmina Jabłonna, within Lublin County, Lublin Voivodeship, in eastern Poland.
