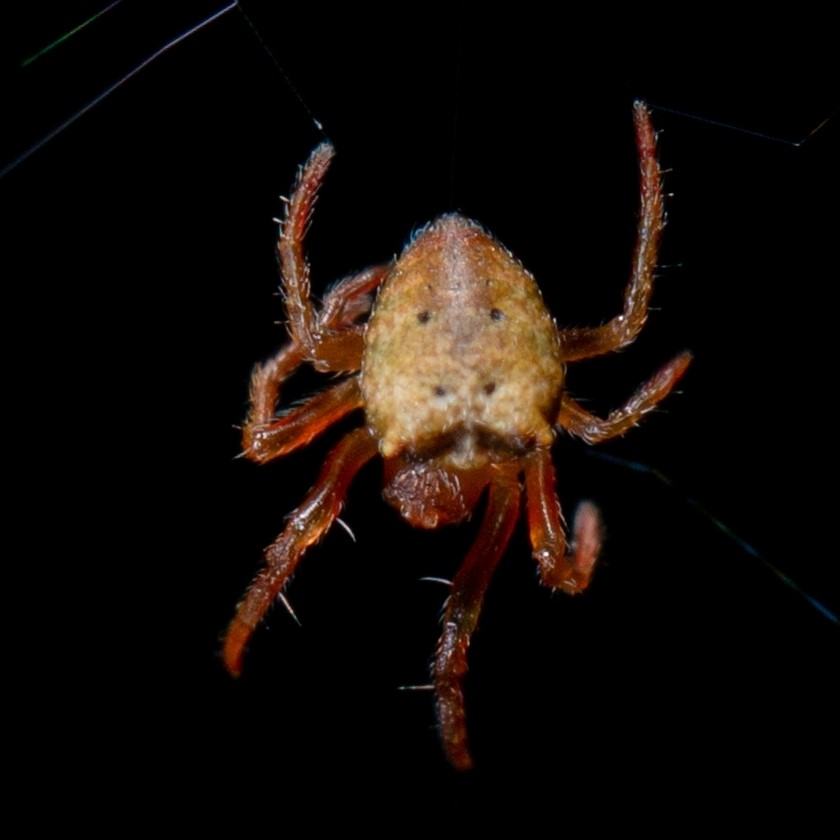

Scientific classification
- Kingdom: Animalia
- Phylum: Arthropoda
- Subphylum: Chelicerata
- Class: Arachnida
- Order: Araneae
- Infraorder: Araneomorphae
- Family: Araneidae
- Genus: Scoloderus
- Species: S. nigriceps

Binomial name
- Scoloderus nigriceps (O. P.-Cambridge, 1895)

= Scoloderus nigriceps =

Species of spider

Scoloderus nigriceps is a species of orb weaver in the spider family Araneidae. It is found in the United States, Mexico, Bahama Islands, Cuba, and Jamaica.
