= Skrzynice =

- Village
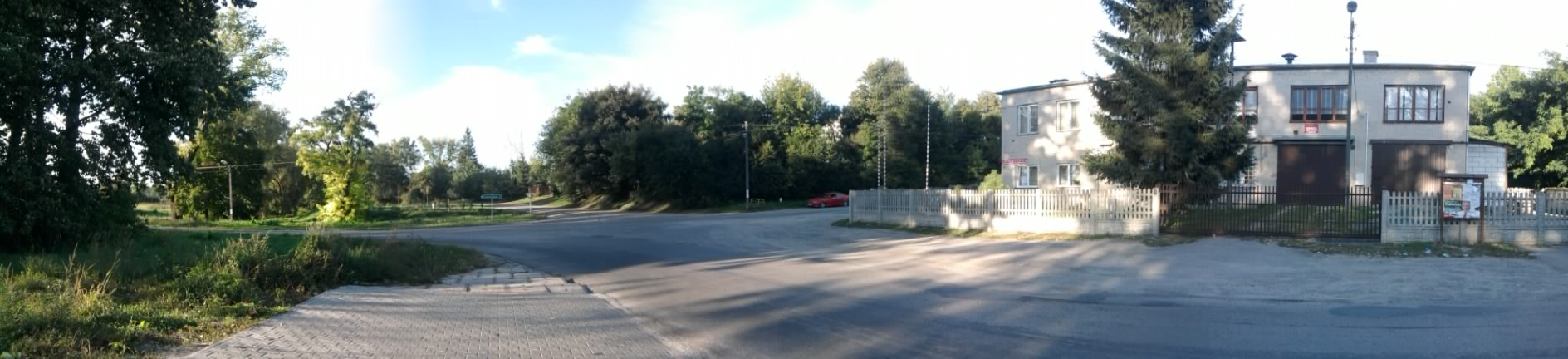

- Location within Poland
- Coordinates: 51°7′25″N 22°37′37″E
- Country: Poland
- Voivodeship: Lublin
- County: Lublin
- Gmina: Jabłonna

Population
  - Total: 1,100

Skrzynice [skʂɨˈnit͡sɛ] is a village in the administrative district of Gmina Jabłonna, within Lublin County, Lublin Voivodeship, in eastern Poland.
