= Bombing of Frampol =

German air attacks on a Polish town in WW2

Coordinates: 50°40′25″N 22°40′05″E

Frampol before (left) and after (right) the German Luftwaffe bombing raids, September 1939

The bombing of Frampol occurred during the German invasion of Poland in 1939. On 13 September, the town of Frampol with a population of 4,000 was bombed by the Luftwaffe's 8th Air Corps, under General Wolfram von Richthofen. The town had no military value, and the bombing was seen as a practice run for future missions.

== The bombardment ==
According to Polish journalist Pawel Puzio and local historian Ryszard Jasinski no units of the Polish army were stationed in Frampol and the town did not have any military facilities. The Luftwaffe likely selected Frampol for an experimental bombing since the town had an extensive market square with a grid plan, making it appear as a large bullseye, and there were no anti-aircraft units located at Frampol. In his 1968 book, Augen am Himmel (Eyes on the Sky), German writer Wolfgang Schreyer wrote: "Frampol was chosen as an experimental object, because test bombers, flying at low speed, weren't endangered by AA fire. Also, the centrally placed town hall was an ideal orientation point for the crews. We studied the possibility of orientation after visible signs, and also the size of the village. On the one hand, it should make the note of probe; on the other hand, it should confirm the efficiency of used bombs." British historian Norman Davies writes in Europe at War 1939–1945: No Simple Victory: "Frampol was chosen partly because it was completely defenceless, and partly because its baroque street plan presented a perfect geometric grid for calculations and measurements."

The first German reconnaissance plane appeared over Frampol on 9 September 1939 taking reconnaissance photographs of the location then on 11 and 12 September the town was bombed. The first raids did not cause any significant damage, but the subsequent bombing on 13 September completely destroyed the town. According to Davies, 125 bombers dropped 700 tons of explosives during bombing, which lasted for several hours. Furthermore, German fighter pilots trained strafing techniques on refugees who were trying to flee from the city.

== Aftermath ==
After the bombing, on 18 September, a German reconnaissance plane again appeared over Frampol to take photographs of the destruction.

According to Davies, Frampol lost 90% of its buildings and 50% of the population became casualties. Only two streets remained untouched, including some houses on the outskirts. Today Frampol's population is still much lower at about 1.400 people.

== In popular culture ==
The bombing of Frampol plays an important part in the short story "The Little Shoemakers" by Isaac Bashevis Singer.

Isaac Bashevis Singer also wrote "The Tale of Three Wishes" in which artist Irene Lieblich beautifully illustrates the Market Of Frampol, a direct reflection of her memories of Frampol.
