= Wiktor Godlewski =

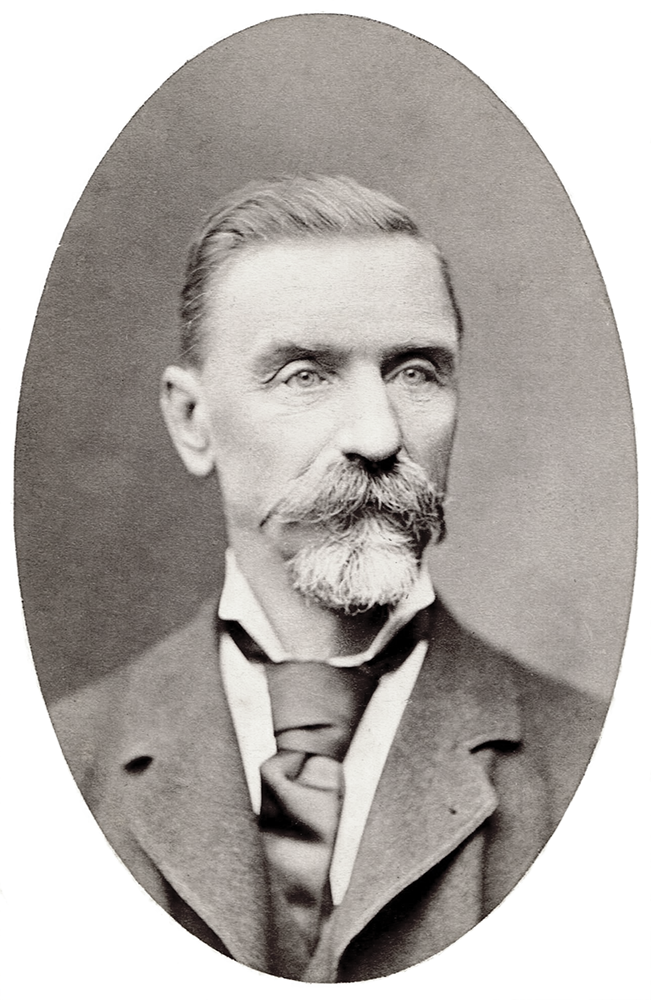
Godlewski in 1890

Wiktor Godlewski (30 December 1831 – 17 November 1900) was a Polish nobleman, explorer, and naturalist. After spending time in Siberian labour camps following his participation in the January Uprising, he began to study the natural history of the Siberian region. Many species of birds and other animals are named after him including Godlewski's bunting.

== Life and work ==
Godlewski was born to Aleksander and Anna Karolina daughter of Józef Ciołkowski in Boguty Wielkie in the Polish noble clan Gozdawa. After the death of his father in 1848 he moved to work in the Brulino-Koski estate of his cousin Józef Wincenty. He took an interest in hunting and collecting bird specimens and collaborated with Władysław Taczanowski. In 1863, he was punished for taking part in the January Uprising and sent to labour in Siberian mines for 12 years. From 1864, he worked for a while in Pietrowska Mine in Irkutsk. Along with another inmate Alfons Parvex, he studied the Daurian fauna.

His sentence ended in 1877 and he managed estates for sometime and then bough some land. After release he began to collaborate with Benedykt Dybowski to study the Siberian fauna and flora between 1864 and 1877. Along with Dybowski, they were the first to measure the depth of the Baikal Lake. They collected bird specimens that were used by Taczanowski in his Fauna ornithologique de la Siberie Orientale published in the Journal für Ornithologie. They were also assisted in the Siberian region by the Polish exile Michał Jankowski. By 1890 he bought Smolecha estate near Ostrów Mazowiecki and started a credit banking organizations including a Cooperative Bank. By 1900 he was on the hunting board for Ostrow. He died from typhus at his Smolechy estate and was buried in the Jasienica cemetery.

Godlewski was awarded a gold medal in 1870 by the Russian Geographical Society. He is honoured in the names of the birds Emberiza godlewskii, Anthus godlewskii, the fish Limnocottus godlewskii, the mollusc genus Godlewskia, and the polychaete Dybowscella godlewskii among others.
