= Voivodeship road 835 =

Road in Poland

Coordinates: 50°40′59″N 22°40′42″E

Voivodeship Road 835
- Droga wojewódzka nr 835
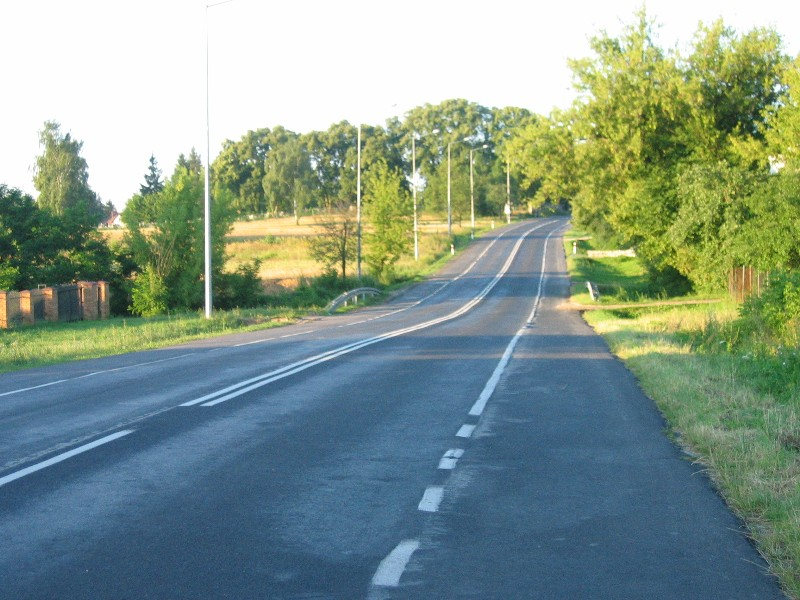
- The Voivodeship road 835 in Czerniejów.

Location
- Country: Poland
- Regions: Lublin Voivodeship, Subcarpathian Voivodeship
- Major cities: Lublin, Biłgoraj, Przeworsk

Highway system
- National roads in Poland; Voivodeship roads
← DW 834	→ DW 836

Voivodeship road 835 (Polish: droga wojewódzka nr 835) in Poland is a voivodeship road linking Lublin with Biłgoraj, Przemyśl, and Sanok. It is one of the main highways in Lublin province. It is currently the longest provincial road in Poland, with a length of about 220 km (140 mi).

The road is included in the heavy traffic on sections of Lublin – Piotrków and Tarnawa Mała – Frampol has hardened shoulders. Almost the entire length, except for the initial segment in Lublin (Kunicki Street) has one lane in each direction.

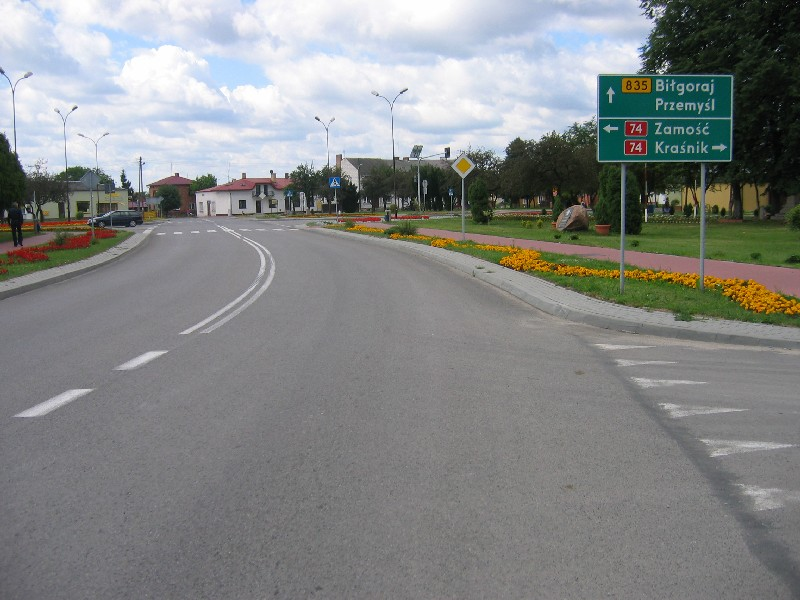
The Voivodeship road 835 in Frampol.

== Cities and towns lying along the route ==
- Lublin
- Frampol
- Biłgoraj
- Tarnogród
- Sieniawa
- Przeworsk
- Kańczuga
- Dynow
- Grabownica Starzeńska
