= Frampol =

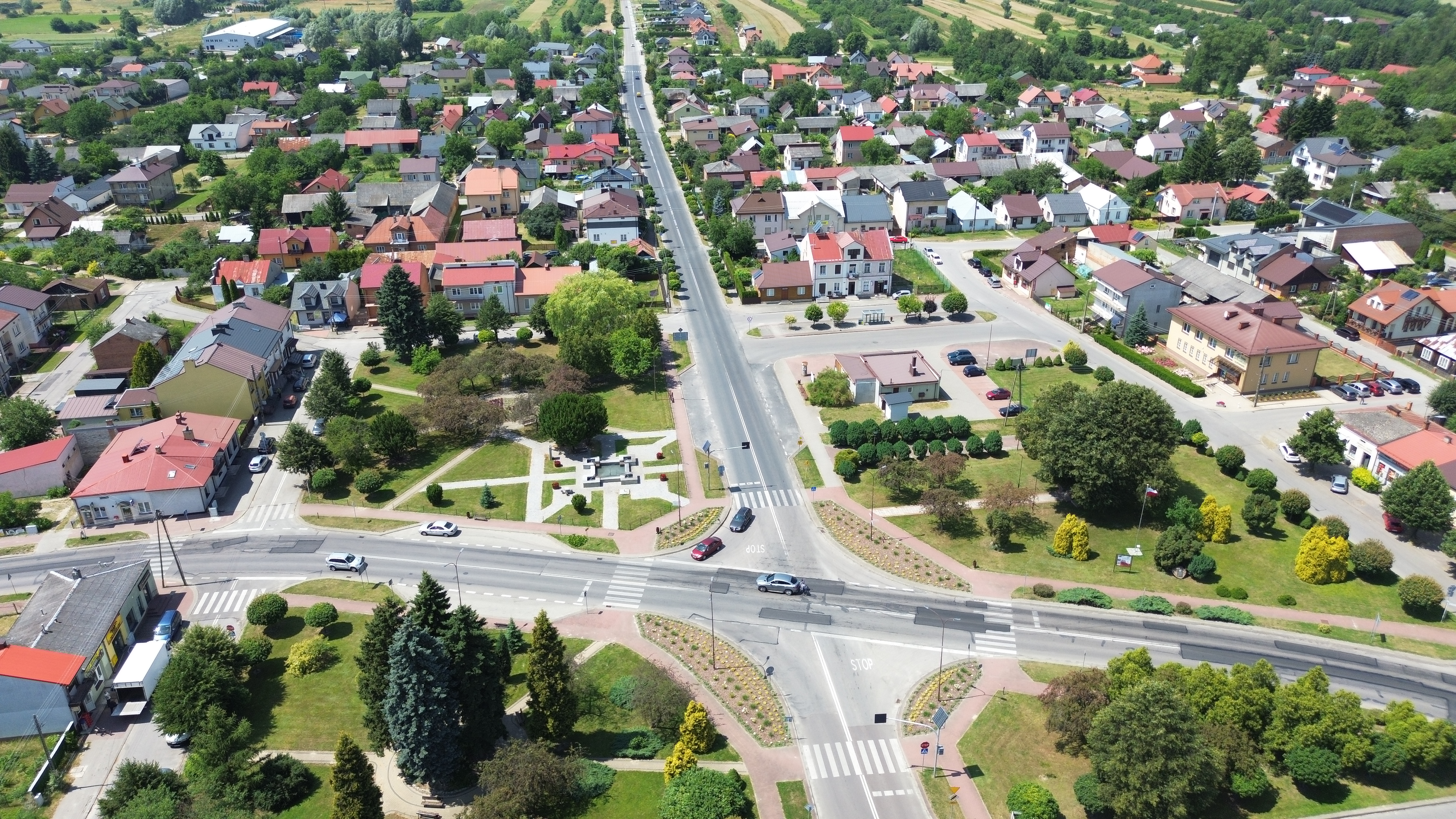
- Aerial view of Frampol

- Coat of arms

- Location within Poland
- Coordinates: 50°41′N 22°40′E
- Country: Poland
- Voivodeship: Lublin
- County: Biłgoraj
- Gmina: Frampol

Government
  - Mayor: Józef Rudy (Ind.)

Area
  - Total: 4.67 km^{2} (1.80 sq mi)
- Elevation: 245 m (804 ft)

Population (31 December 2021)
  - Total: 1,431
  - Density: 306/km^{2} (794/sq mi)
- Time zone: UTC+1 (CET)
  - Summer (DST): UTC+2 (CEST)
- Postal code: 23–440
- Area code: +48 84
- Car plates: LBL
- Website: https://www.frampol.pl

Frampol [ˈframpɔl] is a small town in eastern Poland, in Biłgoraj County, within Lublin Voivodeship. It has 1,431 inhabitants (December 2021), and lies in the eastern part of a historic region of Lesser Poland, near a hilly upland called Roztocze. Frampol is surrounded by the Szczebrzeszyn Landscape Park and the Janów Lubelski Forest. The town is a junction of two local roads (the 74th and the 835th). The distance to Lublin is 68 kilometers.

== History ==
=== 18th century ===
The town was founded in 1717 by Count Marek Antoni Butler, with a unique, highly symmetric layout of streets in the shape of concentric rectangles around a large central square. Its name, originally spelled Franopole, comes from Franciszka née Szczuka, the wife of Count Butler. In 1735, the Jewish community of Frampol already had its own cemetery, and in 1740, Józef Butler funded a wooden church, which since 1778 exists as a separate parish. In the second half of the 18th century, the town belonged to the Wisłocki family. It was an important center of artisans, mostly cloth makers, and all houses were made of timber. In 1789, King Stanisław August Poniatowski established seven annual fairs. Frampol belonged to Lublin Voivodeship in the Lesser Poland Province of the Kingdom of Poland.

=== 19th and 20th century ===
The town was annexed by Austria in the Third Partition of Poland in 1795. After the Polish victory in the Austro-Polish War of 1809, it became part of the short-lived Duchy of Warsaw, and after the duchy's dissolution in 1815, it fell to the Russian-controlled Congress Poland. In 1921, already in the Second Polish Republic, the population of Frampol was 2,720.

=== Second World War ===
Frampol before (left) and after (right) the German Luftwaffe bombing raids, September 1939

During the German invasion of Poland at the start of World War II, 90% of the town's buildings were destroyed in a raid carried out by the Luftwaffe on September 13, 1939. During the German occupation, the town's significant Jewish community was murdered in the Holocaust. The town never fully recovered – its population today is less than half of what it was before the war. Frampol, or a fictionalized version thereof, is the setting of many of the best stories of Isaac Bashevis Singer, including Gimpel the Fool. Artist Irene Lieblich illustrated the Market of Frampol in Isaac Bashevis Singer's book 'A Tale of Three Wishes' from her direct memory of the marketplace of Frampol. This is the only known painting of the Frampol Marketplace as it existed before the full destruction by the German Luftwaffe.

=== Contemporary ===
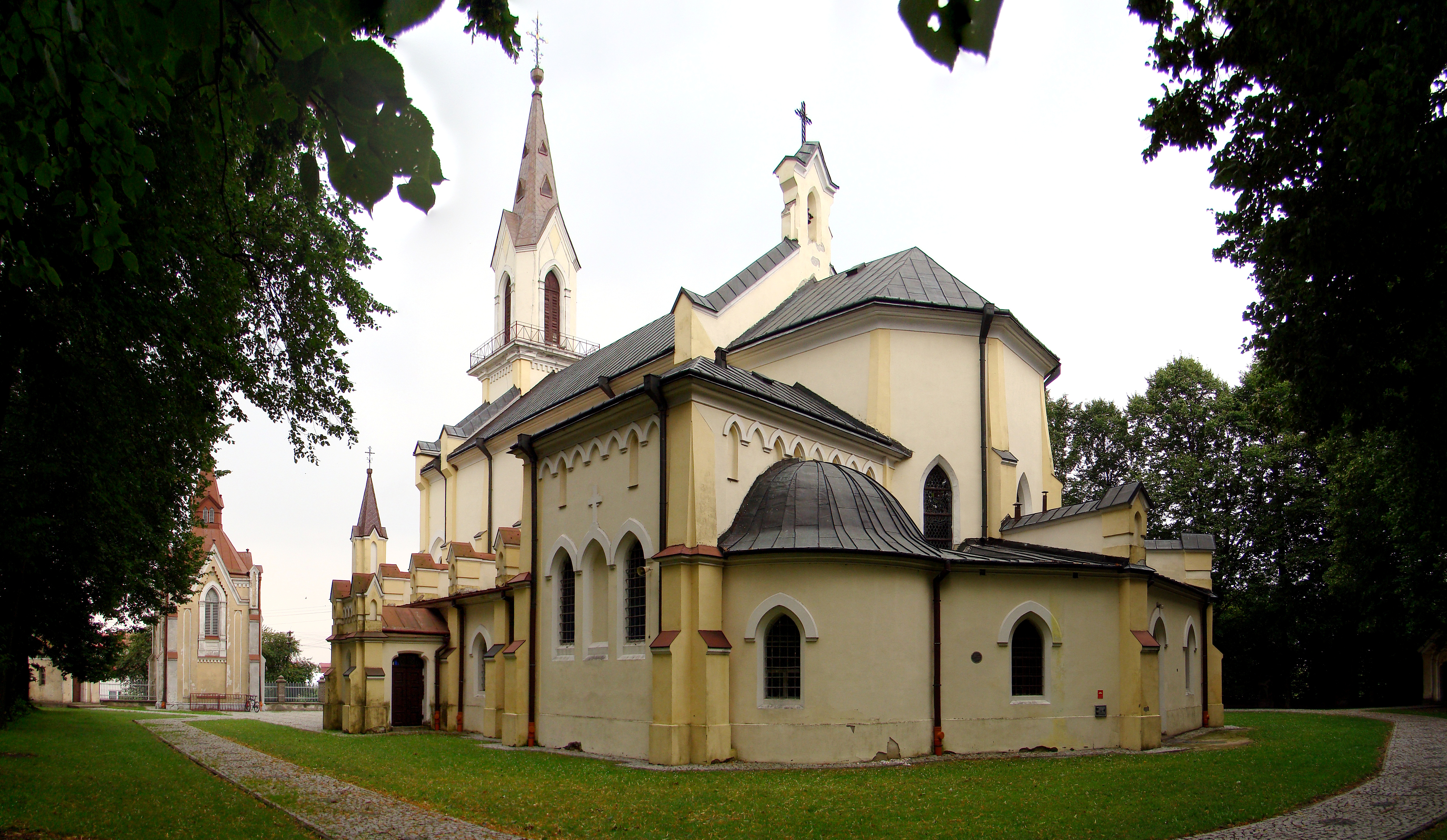
St. John's Catholic Church

Currently, it is one of the smallest towns in Poland. In 1869 Frampol lost its official status as a town, to recover it only in 1993.
