= Czerniejów-Kolonia =

- Village
- Location within Poland
- Coordinates: 51°7′22.46″N 22°36′1.80″E
- Country: Poland
- Voivodeship: Lublin
- County: Lublin
- Gmina: Jabłonna

Czerniejów-Kolonia [t͡ʂɛrˈɲɛjuf kɔˈlɔɲa] is a village in the administrative district of Gmina Jabłonna, within Lublin County, Lublin Voivodeship, in eastern Poland.
