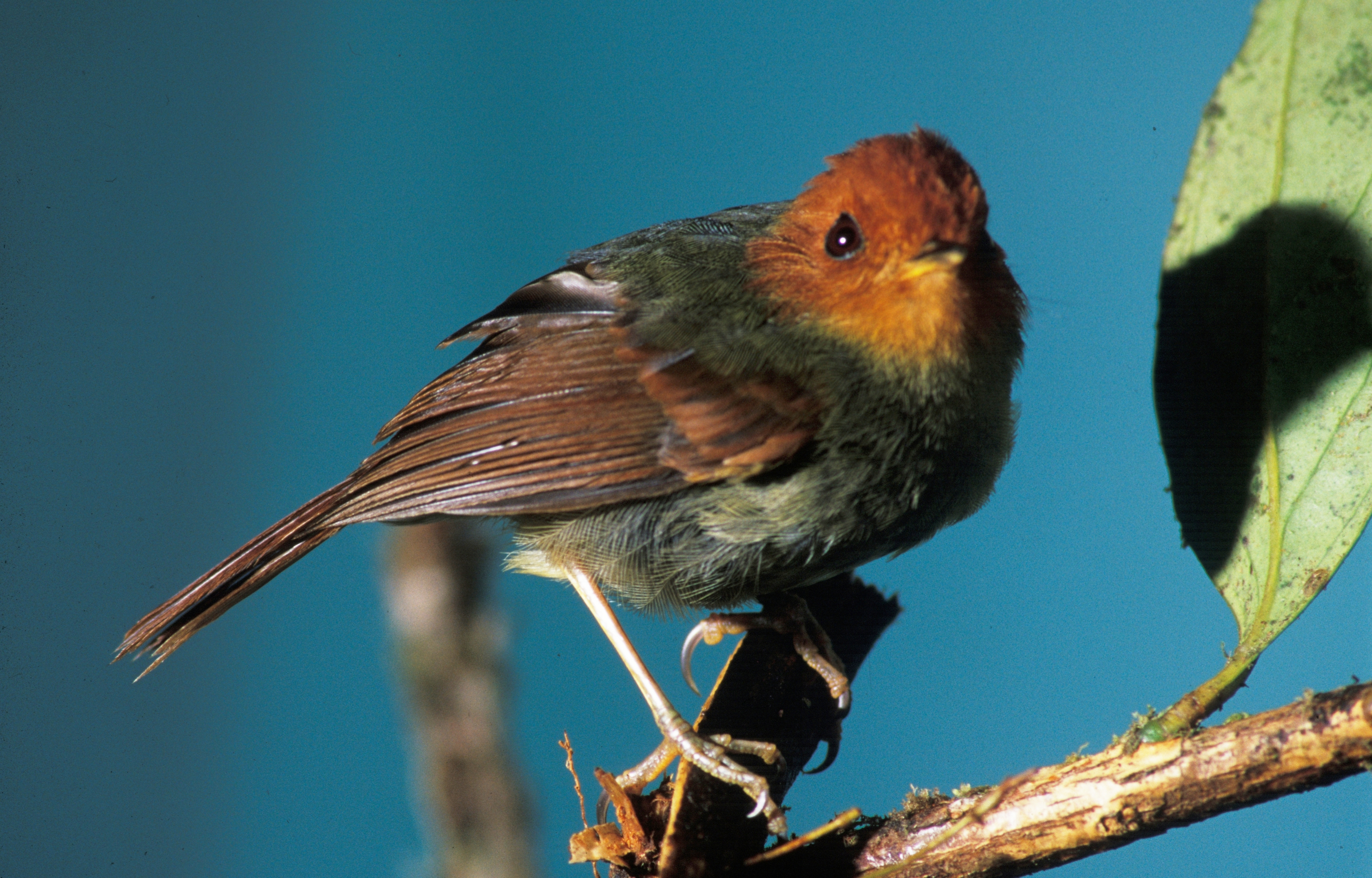

Conservation status
- Least Concern (IUCN 3.1)

Scientific classification
- Kingdom: Animalia
- Phylum: Chordata
- Class: Aves
- Order: Passeriformes
- Family: Tyrannidae
- Genus: Pseudotriccus
- Species: P. ruficeps

Binomial name
- Pseudotriccus ruficeps (Lafresnaye, 1843)

= Rufous-headed pygmy tyrant =

Species of bird

The rufous-headed pygmy tyrant (Pseudotriccus ruficeps) is a species of bird in the family Tyrannidae, the tyrant flycatchers. It is found in Bolivia, Colombia, Ecuador, and Peru with at least one record in Venezuela.

== Taxonomy and systematics ==
The rufous-headed pygmy tyrant was originally described as "Musicapa (Todirostrum?) ruficeps". It was later moved to the monotypic genus Caenotriccus which in the middle of the twentieth century was merged into Pseudotriccus.

The rufous-headed pygmy tyrant has no subspecies. However, the population in central Peru is treated by some authors as subspecies P. r. haplopteryx, and populations further south are suspected to be a separate species.

== Description ==
The rufous-headed pygmy tyrant is about 11 cm (4.3 in) long and weighs 7 to 9 g (0.25 to 0.32 oz). The sexes have the same plumage. Adults have an entirely bright orange-rufous head and throat. Their upperparts are dark olive and their tail dull chestnut. Their wings are dark dusky with wide dull chestnut edges; the wings appear fully chestnut. The central Peruvian population has browner wings. Their breast and flanks are grayish olive and the center of their belly and their undertail coverts creamy yellow. Both sexes have a dark brown iris, a black maxilla, a mostly yellowish mandible, and gray legs and feet. Juveniles are mostly dark olive, with a brownish olive head, rufous-brown wings, and a whitish chin.

== Distribution and habitat ==
The rufous-headed pygmy tyrant has a disjunct distribution. In Colombia it is found in parts of all three Andean ranges. In Ecuador it continues from Colombia on the western Andean slope south into Pichincha Province and separately further south between Guayas and El Oro provinces. It also occurs on the eastern Andean slope for essentially the whole length of Ecuador into Peru. Its range continues through Peru on the eastern slope and into Bolivia as far as Cochabamba Department. There is a single audio recording from 1986 in Apure, Venezuela, almost on the Colombian border.

The species inhabits humid montane forest and cloudforest in the temperate and subtropical zones, where it favors vine thickets and the forest borders. In elevation it occurs mostly between 2,000 and 3,150 m (6,600 and 10,300 ft) in Colombia (though as low as 400 m (1,300 ft) in the southwest), mostly between 2,000 and 3,300 m (6,600 and 10,800 ft) in Ecuador, and between 2,000 and 3,350 m (6,600 and 11,000 ft) in Peru.

== Behavior ==
=== Movement ===
The rufous-headed pygmy tyrant is a year-round resident.

=== Feeding ===
The rufous-headed pygmy tyrant feeds on insects and other arthropods. It usually forages singly or in small groups. It hunts near the ground in dense undergrowth, making short flights between perches, and jumping up from a perch to take prey from leaves and twigs with an audible snap of the bill.

=== Breeding ===
The rufous-headed pygmy tyrant appears to breed before and maybe into June in Colombia and between July and March in eastern Peru, but details are lacking. Nothing else is known about the species' breeding biology.

=== Vocalization ===
The rufous-headed pygmy tyrant's song has been described as "a protracted and very high-pitched trill, at first descending, then ascending, 'tsi-i-i-i-i-i-e-e-e-u-e-e-e-i-i-i-i?' " and its call as "a sharp and drawn-out, rattled 'tzrrrrrrrrrrrr' ". The song has been similarly described a "a deep, descending trill followed abruptly by a rising, higher-pitched trill" grrrrrrew'REEEEEEE?" and its call as "a deep, growling trill".

== Status ==
The IUCN has assessed the rufous-headed pygmy tyrant as being of Least Concern. It has a large range; its population size is not known and is believed to be decreasing. No immediate threats have been identified. It is considered rare in Bolivia, fairly common to common in Peru, and common in Colombia. It occurs in several protected areas, but is "[p]robably locally extinct in areas where deforestation has been intense, e.g. in SW Ecuador".
