= Wierciszów =

- Village
- Location within Poland
- Coordinates: 51°4′N 22°34′E
- Country: Poland
- Voivodeship: Lublin
- County: Lublin
- Gmina: Jabłonna

Population
  - Total: 280

Wierciszów [vjɛrˈt͡ɕiʂuf] is a village in the administrative district of Gmina Jabłonna, within Lublin County, Lublin Voivodeship, in eastern Poland.
