= Sosnytsia Regiment =

Sosnytsia Regiment Сосницький полк
- Active: 1648 - 1649; 1663 - 1668
- Country: Cossack Hetmanate
- Type: Cossack Regiment
- Size: 4 sotnias (1648-1649)
- Garrison/HQ: Sosnytsia, Ukraine
- Engagements: Khmelnytsky Uprising; Russo-Polish War (1654–1667)

Commanders
- Notable commanders: Yakiv Skydan

The Sosnytsia Regiment (Ukrainian: Сосницький полк, romanized: Sosnytskyi polk) was one the territorial-administrative subdivisions of the Cossack Hetmanate. The regiment's capital was the city of Sosnytsia, now an urban-type settlement in Chernihiv Oblast of north-central Ukraine. The regiment existed from 1648 to 1649, it was disbanded after Treaty of Zboriv. In 1663 it was recreated and lasted until 1668 when again it was disbanded.

== History ==
=== 1648-1649 ===
In August 1648, during Khmelnytsky Uprising, Regiment was raised from Sosnytsia company of newly liberated Sosnytsia Okrug of Novhorod County of Chernihiv Voivodeship. Other than the regimental capital of Sosnytsia, it covered towns and villages of Lavy, Rudnia, Ustia, Upper Yaklychi, Lower Yaklychi, Zmitniv, Koniatyn, Kozlenychi and Shabalyniv. Colonel Leontii Rukashka became the first commander. Yurii Khmelnytsky, brother of hetman Bohdan Khmelnytsky was also a colonel of the regiment in 1648 and until it was dissolved in 1649. Tsardom of Russia, Bryansk Voivode Nikofor Meshchersky in a letter to Alexis of Russia received on 11 November [O.S. 1 November] 1648, mentions a letter from Bohdan to his brother Yurii. While Bohdan was continuing his campaign toward Warsaw, Yurii was ordered to remain in Sosnytsia and neighboring cities of Novhorod-Siverskyi, Starodub and Pochep. His regiment was to guard grain and to scout for enemy forces. In the cossack register of 1649, he is listed in Chernihiv Regiment, not holding any rank. His name was also given as Yusko, Iosko. Shortly after Treaty of Zboriv, in 1649, the regiment was disbanded. The Sosnytsia sotnia was transferred to Chernihiv Regiment. The cossack register of 1649, only lists Sosnytsia company and does not mention the regiment.

=== 1663-1668 ===
The regiment was revived by newly elected Hetman Ivan Briukhovetsky, in July 1663. It was formed from sotnias of Nizhyn Regiment, located close to Sosnytsia. As the Nizhyn Regiment was too big and influential, comprising 36 sotnias, Briukhovetsky decided to carve out three new regiments from it. He appointed Yakiv Skydan to lead the regiment. The regiment fought in the Russo-Polish War (1654–1667). During the winter of 1663-64 campaign by Polish–Lithuanian Commonwealth king John II Casimir Vasa and Great Hetman of Lithuania Paweł Jan Sapieha led a large force to fight the Russian forces. Skydan with the regiment was stationed in Berezna and later led raid against Commonwealth baggage train. In January 1664, Yakiv Skydan with a force of 600 cavalry attacked Commonwealth units led by Sapieha near Sosnytsia. He was defeated and captured. Later Skydan was executed by impalement. Kostomarov lists John III Sobieski as commander of forces who defeated Skydan.

Fedir Kholod commanded the regiment from 1964 until it was disbanded in 1968 by either Demian Mnohohrishny or Petro Doroshenko after his to campaign to Left-bank Ukraine. Zaruba lists Petro Doroshenko as person who disbanded the regiment on Sosnytsia sotnia page, and Demian Mnohohrishny on Sosnytsia Regiment page. The Sosnytsia sotnia was again transferred to Chernihiv Regiment as it was in 1649.

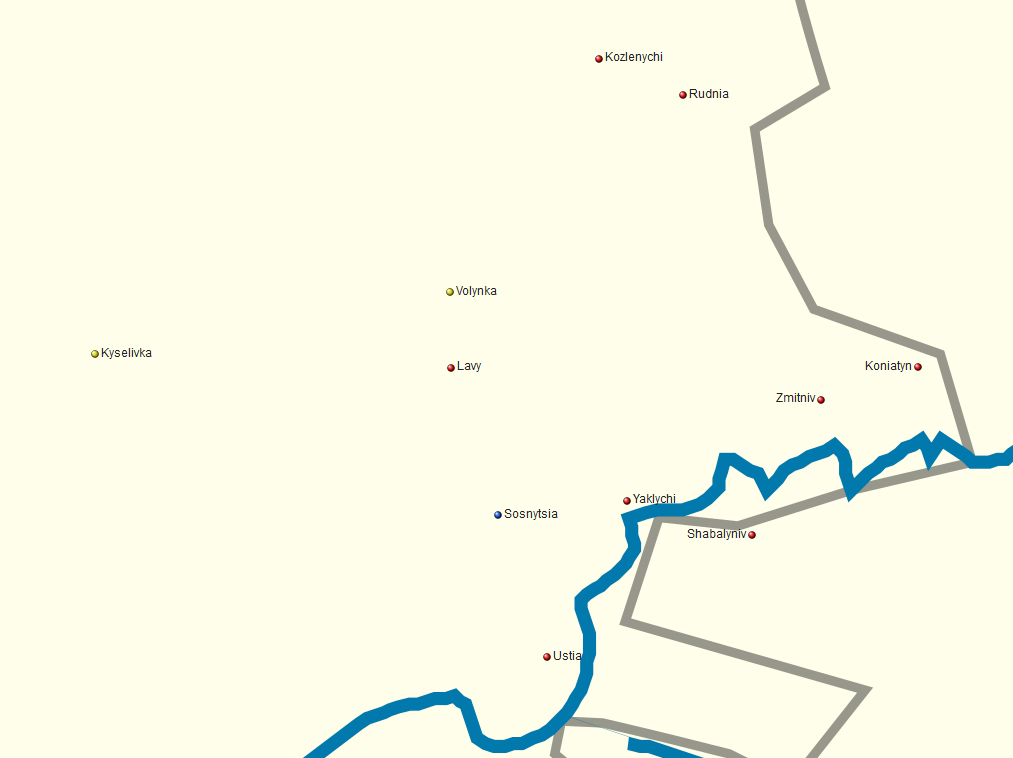
Sosnytsia regiment sotnias location (1648–1649). Red dots are villages belonging to regiment.

== Structure ==
The regiment comprised 4 sotnias during 1648-1649:

- Sosnytsia 1st
- Sosnytsia 2nd
- Volynka
- Kyselivka

The regiments composition during 1658-1663 is unknown.

== Commanders ==
All commanders were Colonels.

- Leontii Rukashka 1648-1649
- Yurii Khmelnytsky 1648-1649
- Yakiv Skydan July 1663-January 1664
- Fedir Kholod 1664-1668

Krjvosheja lists Yakiv Skydan as a colonel from 1662 to September 1663, while also listing him as Yatsko, which is a different version of the name Yakiv. Gajecky spells his name as Iakiv. Myshanych also writes that Skydan was a colonel during 1648–1649. He also gives name for Rukashka as Rakushka.

Yakiv Skydan was a registered cossack of 2nd Irkliiv sootnia of the Kropyvna Regiment in 1649.

== Sources ==
- Zaruba, Viktor (2007), Адміністративно-територіальний устрій та адміністрація Війська Запорозького у 1648-1782 рр. [Administrative-territorial structure and administration of the Zaporizhzhya Army in 1648-1782.] (in Ukrainian), Dnipro: Lira, p. 92, ISBN 978-966-383-095-7
- Bodyansky, Osip (1974), РЕЕСТРА ВСЕГО ВОЙСКА ЗАПОРОЖСКАГО ПОСЛѢ ЗБОРОВСКАГО ДОГОВОРА [Register of all Zaporozhian Host after Treaty of Zboriv] (in Russian), Moscow: Imperial Moscow University
- Panashenko, Vira; Strashko, Viktor; Ostash, Roman; Ostash, Nadiia; Nekuppiny, Anatoly (1995), Shevchenko, Fedir; Boryak, Henadii; Dashkevich, Yaroslav; Krekoten, Volodymyr; Lukichov, Mykhailo; Mytsik, Yurii; Nimchuk, Vasyl; Smolii, Valerii; Sokhan, Pavlo; Yakovenko, Nataliia; Cherkaska, Nataliia (eds.), Реєстр Війська Запорозького 1649 року [Register of the Zaporozhian Army in 1649] (in Ukrainian), Todiychuk Olha (prepared), Kyiv: Naukova Dumka, ISBN 5-12-002042-9
