= Jabłonna, Lublin Voivodeship =

Jabłonna
- Village
- Location within Poland
- Coordinates: 51°5′14″N 22°35′24″E
- Country: Poland
- Voivodeship: Lublin
- County: Lublin
- Gmina: Jabłonna

Population
  - Total: 2,041

Jabłonna [jaˈbwɔnna] is a village in Lublin County, Lublin Voivodeship, in eastern Poland. It is the seat of the gmina (administrative district) called Gmina Jabłonna.

== Notable residents ==
- Władysław Taczanowski (1819–1890), Polish zoologist
