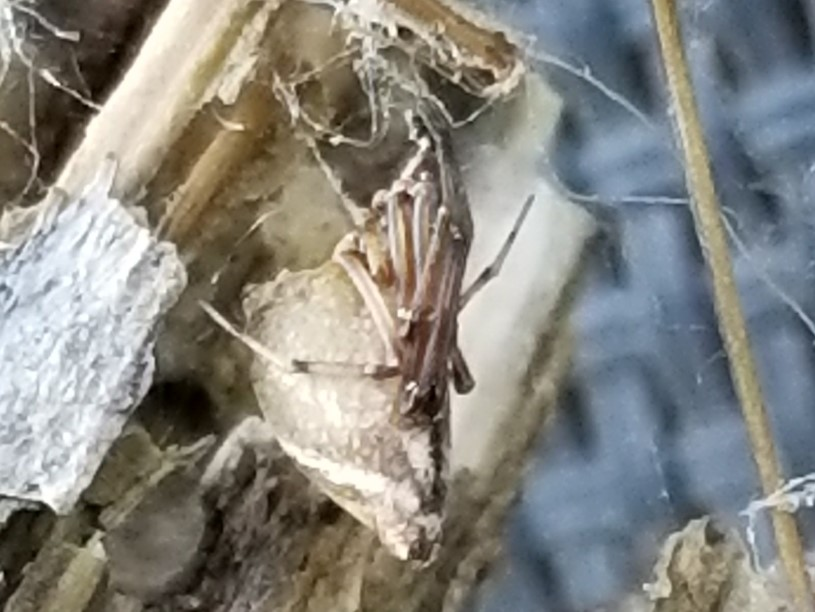

Scientific classification
- Domain: Eukaryota
- Kingdom: Animalia
- Phylum: Arthropoda
- Subphylum: Chelicerata
- Class: Arachnida
- Order: Araneae
- Infraorder: Araneomorphae
- Family: Theridiidae
- Genus: Neospintharus
- Species: N. furcatus

Binomial name
- Neospintharus furcatus (O. P.-Cambridge, 1894)

= Neospintharus furcatus =

Species of spider

Neospintharus furcatus is a species of cobweb spider in the family Theridiidae. It is found in a range from the United States to El Salvador and the Caribbean Sea. It is primarily kleptoparasitic.
