= Khmil =

Khmil (Ukrainian: Хміль) is a Ukrainian surname. Notable people with the surname include:

- Anhelina Khmil (born 2003), Ukrainian beach volleyball player
- Mykhailo Khmil (born 1973), Ukrainian politician

== See also ==
- Chmiel (surname), Polish cognate
