= Wolnica, Lublin Voivodeship =

Wolnica
- Village
- Location within Poland
- Coordinates: 51°5′N 22°43′E
- Country: Poland
- Voivodeship: Lublin
- County: Lublin
- Gmina: Jabłonna

Wolnica [vɔlˈnit͡sa] is a village in the administrative district of Gmina Jabłonna, within Lublin County, Lublin Voivodeship, in eastern Poland.
