= Piotrków-Kolonia =

- Village
- Location within Poland
- Coordinates: 51°01′45″N 22°39′00″E
- Country: Poland
- Voivodeship: Lublin
- County: Lublin
- Gmina: Jabłonna

Piotrków-Kolonia [ˈpjɔtrkuf kɔˈlɔɲa] is a village in the administrative district of Gmina Jabłonna, within Lublin County, Lublin Voivodeship, in eastern Poland.
