= Yurii Mykhailovych Khmelnytsky =

Colonel of Ukrainian Cossacks

Yurii Mykhailovych Khmelnytskyi (Ukrainian: Юрій Михайлович Хмельницький) was a Ukrainian colonel of Sosnytsia Regiment during Cossack Hetmanate in 1648-1649.

Yurii Khmelnytsky, brother of hetman Bohdan Khmelnytsky was a colonel of Sosnytsia Regiment in 1648 and until it was dissolved in 1649. Tsardom of Russia, Bryansk Voivode Nikofor Meshchersky in a letter to Alexis of Russia received on 11 November [O.S. 1 November] 1648, mentions a letter from Bohdan to his brother Yurii. While Bohdan was continuing his campaign toward Warsaw, Yurii was ordered to remain in Sosnytsia and neighboring cities of Novhorod-Siverskyi, Starodub and Pochep. His regiment was to guard grain and to scout for enemy forces. In the cossack register of 1649, he is listed in Chernihiv Regiment, not holding any rank. His name was also given as Yusko, Iosko.

== Sources ==
- Zaruba, Viktor (2007), Адміністративно-територіальний устрій та адміністрація Війська Запорозького у 1648-1782 рр. [Administrative-territorial structure and administration of the Zaporizhzhya Army in 1648-1782.] (in Ukrainian), Dnipro: Lira, ISBN 978-966-383-095-7
- Bodyansky, Osip (1974), РЕЕСТРА ВСЕГО ВОЙСКА ЗАПОРОЖСКАГО ПОСЛѢ ЗБОРОВСКАГО ДОГОВОРА [Register of all Zaporozhian Host after Treaty of Zboriv] (in Russian), Moscow: Imperial Moscow University
- Panashenko, Vira; Strashko, Viktor; Ostash, Roman; Ostash, Nadiia; Nekuppiny, Anatoly (1995), Shevchenko, Fedir; Boryak, Henadii; Dashkevich, Yaroslav; Krekoten, Volodymyr; Lukichov, Mykhailo; Mytsik, Yurii; Nimchuk, Vasyl; Smolii, Valerii; Sokhan, Pavlo; Yakovenko, Nataliia; Cherkaska, Nataliia (eds.), Реєстр Війська Запорозького 1649 року [Register of the Zaporozhian Army in 1649] (in Ukrainian), Todiychuk Olha (prepared), Kyiv: Naukova Dumka, ISBN 5-12-002042-9
