= Gmina Jabłonna, Lublin Voivodeship =

Gmina Jabłonna Jabłonna Commune
- Gmina
- Flag Coat of arms
- Interactive map of Gmina Jabłonna
- Coordinates (Jabłonna): 51°5′14″N 22°35′24″E
- Country: Poland
- Voivodeship: Lublin
- County: Lublin County
- Seat: Jabłonna

Area
  - Total: 130.98 km^{2} (50.57 sq mi)

Population (2019)
  - Total: 8,044
  - Density: 61.41/km^{2} (159.1/sq mi)
- Website: https://www.jablonna.lubelskie.pl

Gmina Jabłonna is a rural gmina (administrative district) in Lublin County, Lublin Voivodeship, in eastern Poland. Its seat is the village of Jabłonna, which lies approximately 18 kilometres (11 mi) south of the regional capital Lublin.

The gmina covers an area of 130.98 square kilometres (50.6 sq mi), and as of 2019 its total population is 8,044 (7,963 in 2013).

== Villages ==
Gmina Jabłonna contains the villages and settlements of

- Chmiel Drugi,
- Chmiel Pierwszy,
- Chmiel-Kolonia,
- Czerniejów,
- Czerniejów-Kolonia,
- Jabłonna,
- Jabłonna Druga,
- Jabłonna-Majątek,
- Piotrków Drugi,
- Piotrków Pierwszy,
- Piotrków-Kolonia,
- Skrzynice,
- Skrzynice Pierwsze,
- Skrzynice-Kolonia,
- Tuszów,
- Wierciszów
- Wolnica.

== Neighbouring gminas ==
Gmina Jabłonna is bordered by the gminas of Bychawa, Głusk, Krzczonów, Piaski and Strzyżewice.
