= Chmielno =

Chmielno may refer to the following places in Poland:

- Chmielno, Lower Silesian Voivodeship (south-west Poland)
- Chmielno, Pomeranian Voivodeship (north Poland)
- Chmielno, West Pomeranian Voivodeship (north-west Poland)
