= Piotrków Pierwszy =

- Village
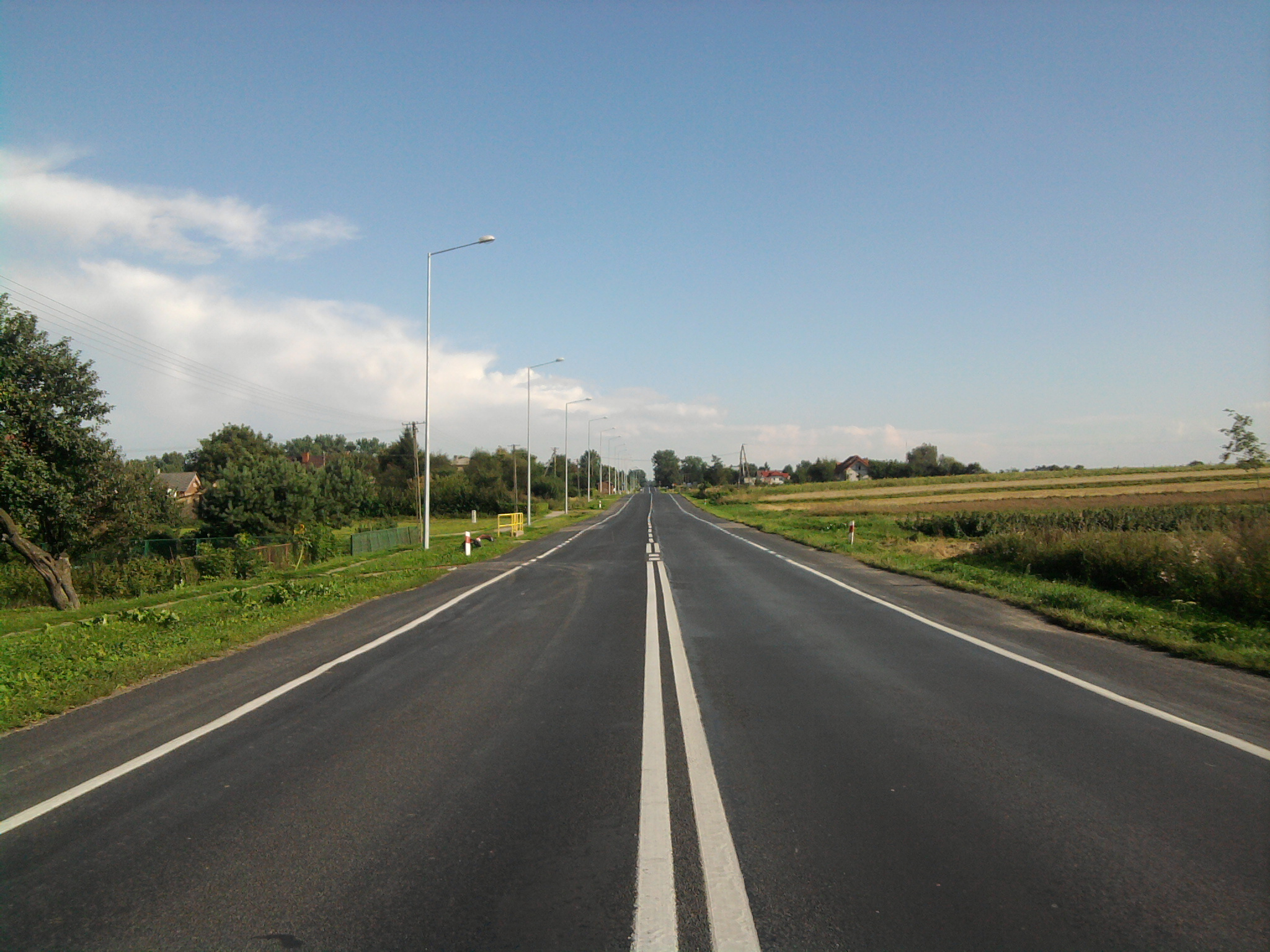
- Voivodeship road 835 in Piotrków

- Location within Poland
- Coordinates: 51°2′32″N 22°38′41″E
- Country: Poland
- Voivodeship: Lublin
- County: Lublin
- Gmina: Jabłonna

Population
  - Total: 790
- Time zone: UTC+1 (CET)
  - Summer (DST): UTC+2 (CEST)

Piotrków Pierwszy [ˈpjɔtrkuf ˈpjɛrfʂɨ] is a village in the administrative district of Gmina Jabłonna, within Lublin County, Lublin Voivodeship, in eastern Poland.

== location ==
Piotrków lies on the Czerniejówka Lublin Upland. It is located in the central part of Lublin Voivodeship in the Lublin district in the municipality of Jabłonna, at Voivodeship road 835.

In the village there are:

- Church;
- Cultural Centre (GCK);
- primary school;
- Public high school;
- public kindergarten;
- Sports Club PLKS "Piotrcovia Piotrków";
- volunteer fire brigade;
- stadium "Orlik"

Close to the village is the hamlet Sacharin.

== History ==
Piotrków existed in the early Middle Ages. The former royal property and manage its tenant. In 1388, King Władysław II Jagiełło village moved to Magdeburg rights.

During World War I was the front here, the whole village was burned. When the front of the local people had gone to clean up the field with the corpses of soldiers flooded the Austro-Hungarian and Imperial Russian Army. Until today, there are remnants of trenches in the woods. In the village there are three war cemeteries from World War I.

Six Polish citizens were murdered by Nazi Germany in the village during World War II.
