= Chmiel-Kolonia =

- Village
- Location within Poland
- Coordinates: 51°5′31″N 22°39′58″E
- Country: Poland
- Voivodeship: Lublin
- County: Lublin
- Gmina: Jabłonna

Population
  - Total: 240

Chmiel-Kolonia [ˈxmjɛl kɔˈlɔɲa] is a village in the administrative district of Gmina Jabłonna, within Lublin County, Lublin Voivodeship, in eastern Poland.
