= Chmiel (surname) =

Chmiel is a Polish surname. Notable people with the surname include:

- Beata Chmiel, Polish activist
- Damian Chmiel (born 1987), Polish footballer
- Fred Chmiel, American basketball coach
- Juraj Chmiel (born 1960), Czech diplomat
- Karol Chmiel (1911–1951), Polish resistance fighter
- Małgorzata Chmiel (born 1953), Polish politician

== See also ==
- Khmil, Ukrainian cognate surname
