= Piotrków Drugi =

- Village
- Location within Poland
- Coordinates: 51°3′36″N 22°37′30″E
- Country: Poland
- Voivodeship: Lublin
- County: Lublin
- Gmina: Jabłonna

Population
  - Total: 770

Piotrków Drugi [ˈpjɔtrkuf ˈdruɡi] is a village in the administrative district of Gmina Jabłonna, within Lublin County, Lublin Voivodeship, in eastern Poland.
