= Władysław Taczanowski =

Polish zoologist and collector of natural history

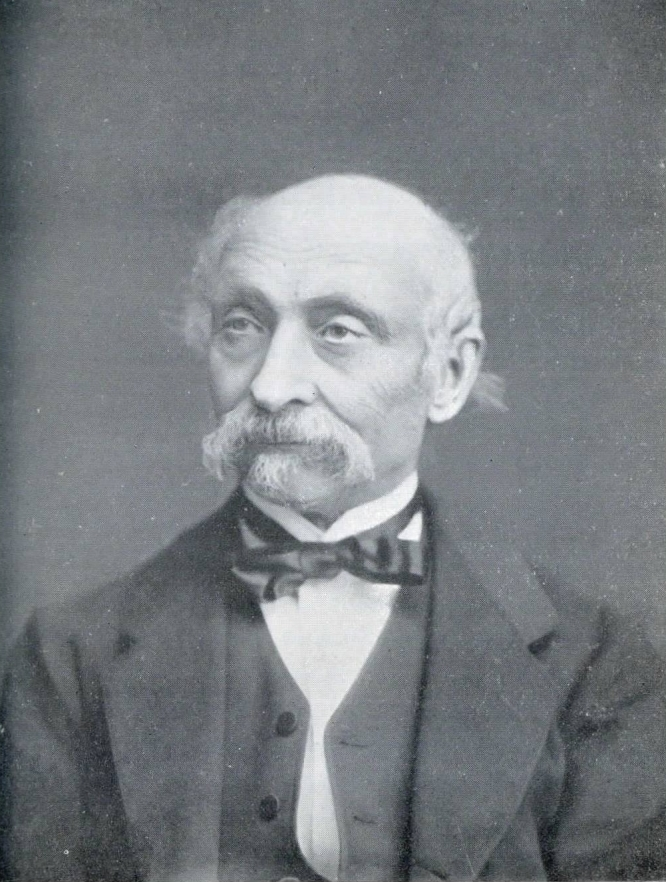
- Born: 17 March 1819; Jabłonna, Lublin Voivodeship, Poland
- Died: 17 January 1890 (aged 70); Warsaw
- Known for: Birds of Poland (1882), Ornithology of Peru (1884-1886)
- Scientific career
- Fields: Birds, reptiles, arachnids
- Workplaces: Warsaw University Museum
- Author abbrev. (zoology): Taczanowski

Władysław Taczanowski ([vwaˈdɨ.swaf ta.t͡ʂaˈnɔf.skʲi]; 17 March 1819, in Jabłonna, Lublin Voivodeship – 17 January 1890, (Note: Death noted as 15 January and birth noted as 1 March in some sources.) in Warsaw) was a Polish zoologist and collector of natural history who explored the Russian Far East and northern Africa. He specialized mainly in ornithology but also described numerous other taxa including reptiles and arachnids.

== Life ==
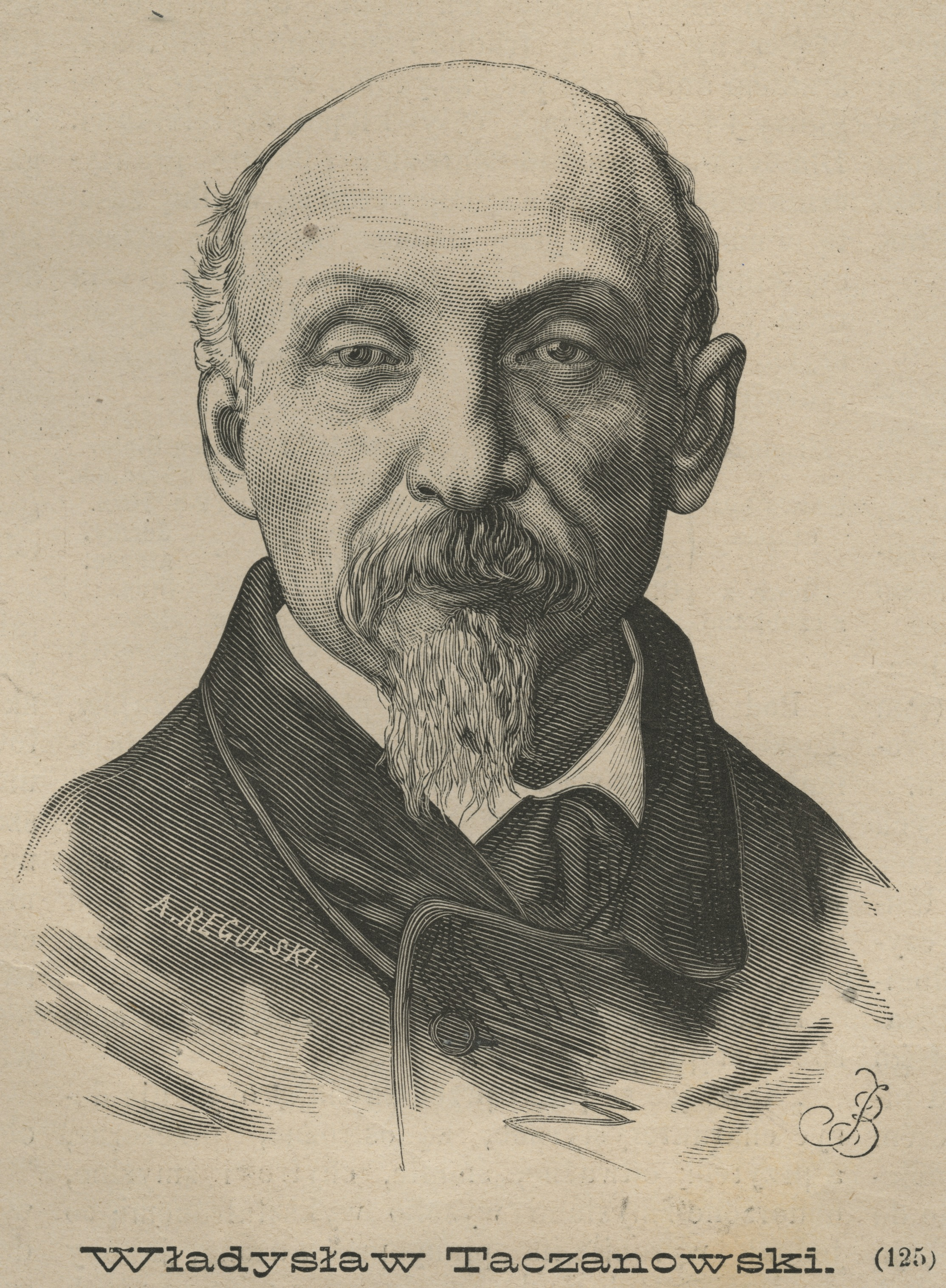
Władysław (or Ladislaus) Taczanowski

A member of an old noble (szlachta) magnate family, Taczanowski, from the Poznań region Władysław studied in Lublin and managed the family farm after the death of his father. He then joined government service and served on special missions of the governor of Radom. He joined the Warsaw University Museum in 1855 and began to travel and train at other museums. In 1865 he joined Benedict Dybowski and Victor Godlewski on expeditions to Eastern Russia. In 1862 he succeeded Feliks Paweł Jarocki as curator. Taczanowski took part in an expedition to Algeria with Antoni S. Waga (1866–67) and wrote several significant studies including Birds of Poland (1882) and Ornithology of Peru (1884-86). He received collections from Cayenne through Constantin Jelski, from the Upper Nile from Counts Alexander and Constantine Branicki. From 1875 he continued to receive specimens from South America after Jean Stolzmann replaced Jelski. He received an honorary doctorate from the University of Krakow in 1887.

Species named after him include Taczanowski's tinamou (Nothoprocta taczanowskii), the Junin flightless grebe (Podiceps taczanowskii), the mountain paca (Agouti taczanowskii), Taczanowski's gudgeon (Ladislavia taczanowskii), and Taczanowski's dwarf boa (Tropidophis taczanowskyi).

== Other works ==
- "Les Aranéides de la Guyane française," Horae Societatis entomologicae Rossicae (1871)
- "Les Aranéides de la Guyane française," Horae Societatis entomologicae Rossicae (1873)
- "Les Aranéides du Pérou. Famille des Attidés" (1879)
- Ornithologie du Pérou (1884)

== Tribute ==
The fish Ladislavia taczanowskii Dybowski, 1869 was named for him.
