= Sójkowa =

- Village
- Location within Poland
- Coordinates: 50°23′N 22°2′E
- Country: Poland
- Voivodeship: Subcarpathian
- County: Nisko
- Gmina: Jeżowe

Sójkowa [sui̯ˈkɔva] is a village in the administrative district of Gmina Jeżowe, within Nisko County, Subcarpathian Voivodeship, in southeastern Poland. It is approximately 8 km (5 mi) west of Jeżowe, 19 km (12 mi) southwest of Nisko, and 39 km (24 mi) north of the regional capital Rzeszów.
