= Łada (river) =

River in Poland

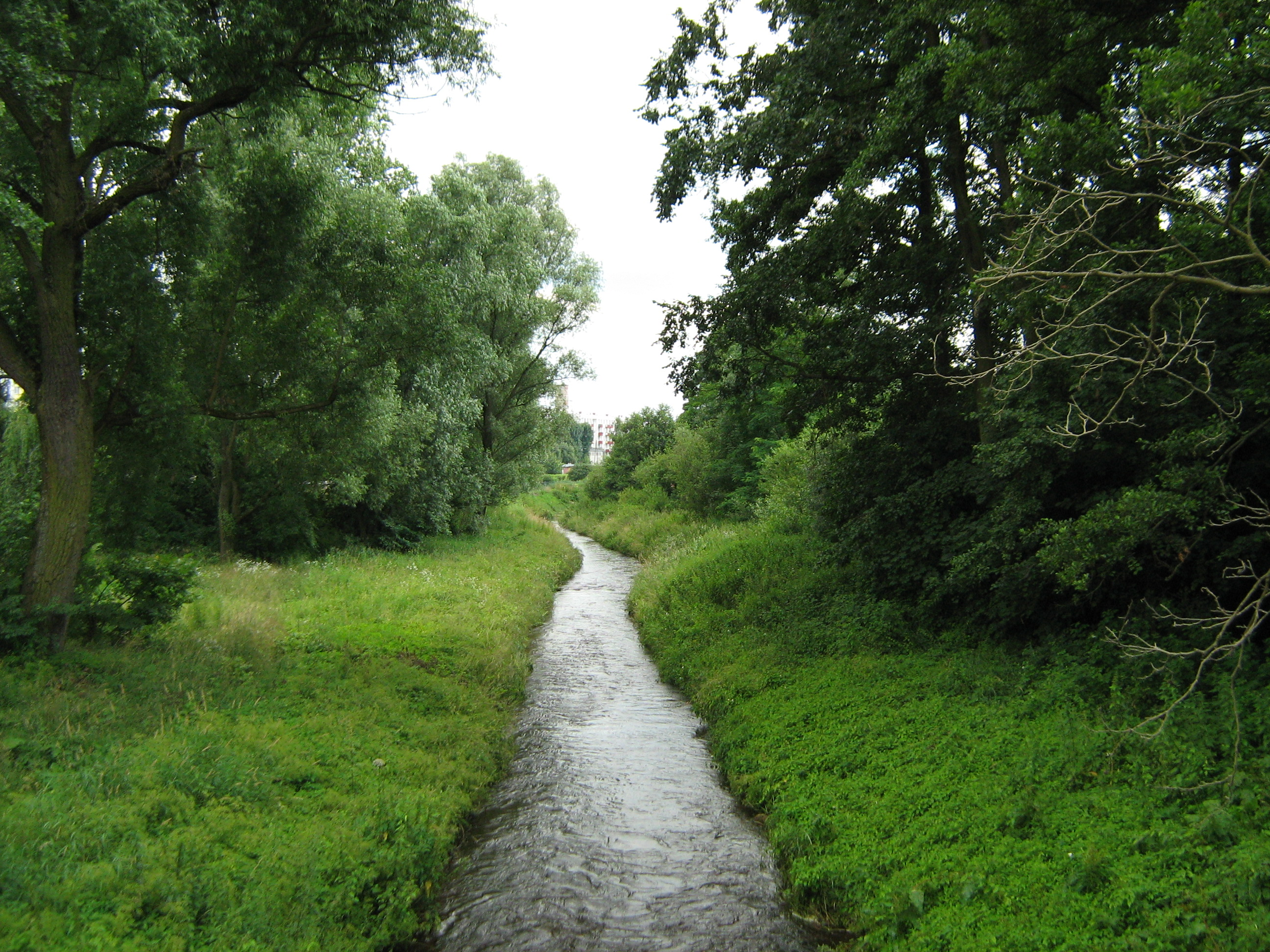
- The Biała Łada in the city of Bilgoraj - view from the bridge at Lubelska Street

Location
- Country: Poland

Physical characteristics
- Source
  - location: Chrzanów
  - coordinates: 50°46′05″N 22°36′36″E
  - elevation: 260 m (850 ft)
- Mouth
  - location: Łazory
  - coordinates: 50°27′57″N 22°33′13″E
  - elevation: 171 m (561 ft)
- Length: 56.5 km (35.1 mi)

Basin features
- Progression: Tanew→ San→ Vistula→ Baltic Sea
- Tributaries
  - left: Czarna Łada, Osa

The Łada (in its upper course the Biała Łada) is a river, the right tributary of the Tanew; it flows from the Western Roztocze through the Biłgoraj Plain in the Lublin Voivodeship, in the counties of Janów and Biłgoraj, and a short distance in the Nisko County (Podkarpackie Voivodeship).

The Łada flows out as the Biała Łada (formerly the Łada Polska) in the village of Chrzanów Pierwszy (part of the village of Chrzanów, Lublin Voivodeship). Near the town of Sól (Biłgoraj County), the river receives its largest (left) tributary, the Czarna Łada (formerly the Łada Ruska), and becomes known as the Łada. The length of the Łada (from the source of the Biała Łada) is 56.5 km. It flows from north to south and passes through Goraj, Wola Radzięcka and the town of Biłgoraj. The river flows into the Tanew river near the village of Łazory at an altitude of 170 m.

The Czarna Łada is a shorter river; it flows from east to west, also passing through Biłgoraj, its sources are located near the village of Margole (Biłgoraj County, Gmina Aleksandrów). Another tributary is the stream Osa.
