= Zhuk =

Zhuk (Cyrillic: Жук), Žuk, or Żuk (Polish), means beetle in Slavic languages. It may refer to:

- Zhuk (surname)
- Zhuk class patrol boat, Soviet and Russian patrol boat manufactured from 1970 to 1996
- Zhuk radar, family of Russian airborne radars developed by NIIR Phazotron for multi-role combat aircraft such as the MiG-29 and the Su-27
- FSC Żuk, a van and light truck produced in Lublin, Poland
- Żuk Nowy, a village in Poland
- Żuk Stary, a village in Poland
- BŻ-4 Żuk, a Polish helicopter

== See also ==
- Zuk (disambiguation)
