= Zhuk (surname) =

Zhuk (Belarusian, Russian, and Ukrainian: Жук) is a gender-neutral surname derived from a Slavic word meaning beetle. Notable people with the surname include:

- Aleksey Zhuk (born 1955), former Soviet/Russian handball player
- Angelina Zhuk-Krasnova (born 1991), Russian pole vaulter
- Dzmitry Zhuk (born 1970), Belarusian journalist and media manager
- Irina Zhuk (born 1966), Soviet ice dancer
- Ksenia Zhuk, Belarusian singer, member of Naviband
- Nina Zhuk (born 1934), Soviet pair skater
- Radyyon Zhuk (born 1983), Belarusian professional footballer
- Sofya Zhuk (born 1999), Russian tennis player
- Stanislav Zhuk (1935–1998), Soviet pair skater
- Tatyana Zhuk (1946–2011), Soviet pair skater
- Vadim Zhuk (born 1952), Belarusian retired football referee
- Vadym Zhuk (born 1991), Ukrainian footballer
- Vincent Zhuk-Hryshkevich (1903–1989), Belarusian politician
- Volodymyr Zhuk, Ukrainian football goalkeeper
- Yawhen Zhuk (born 1976), Belarusian-Israeli football player
- Yevgeny Zhuk, Belarusian-Israeli professional football (soccer) player

== See also ==
- Zhuk (disambiguation)
