= Gmina Krzeszów =

Gmina Krzeszów Krzeszów Commune
- Gmina
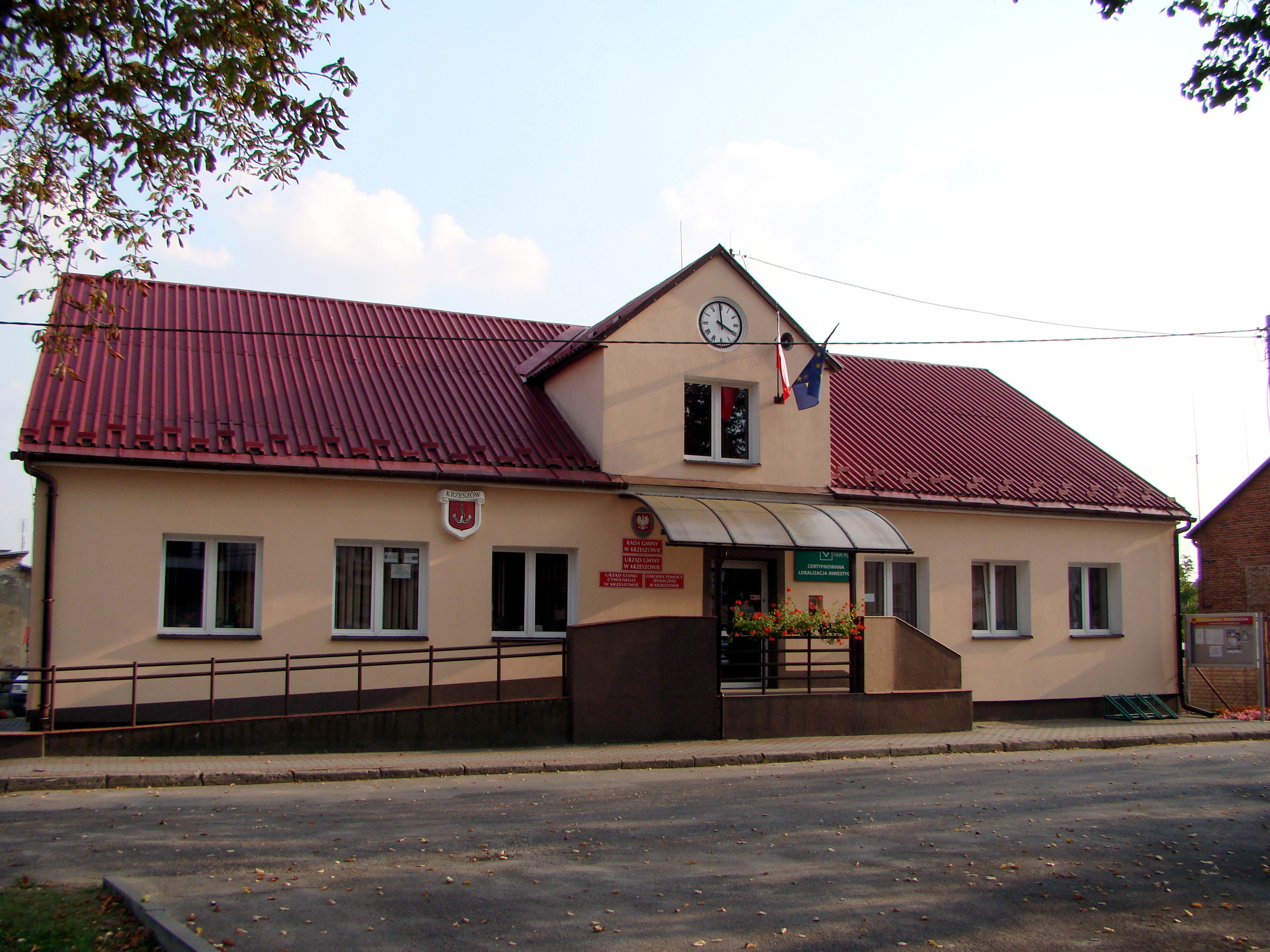
- Gmina Krzeszów Office

- Coat of arms
- Interactive map of Gmina Krzeszów
- Coordinates (Krzeszów): 50°24′14″N 22°20′28″E
- Country: Poland
- Voivodeship: Subcarpathian
- County: Nisko
- Seat: Krzeszów

Area
  - Total: 62.38 km^{2} (24.09 sq mi)

Population (2013)
  - Total: 4,289
  - Density: 68.76/km^{2} (178.1/sq mi)
- Website: http://www.krzeszow.pl

Gmina Krzeszów is a rural gmina (administrative district) in Nisko County, Subcarpathian Voivodeship, in south-eastern Poland. Its seat is the village of Krzeszów, which lies approximately 21 kilometres (13 mi) south-east of Nisko and 48 km (30 mi) north-east of the regional capital Rzeszów.

The gmina covers an area of 62.38 square kilometres (24.1 sq mi), and as of 2006 its total population is 4,227 (4,289 in 2013).

== Villages ==
Gmina Krzeszów contains the villages and settlements of Bystre, Kamionka, Koziarnia, Krzeszów, Krzeszów Dolny, Kustrawa, Łazów, Podolszynka Ordynacka, Podolszynka Plebańska and Sigiełki.

== Neighbouring gminas ==
Gmina Krzeszów is bordered by the gminas of Harasiuki, Kuryłówka, Leżajsk, Nowa Sarzyna, Potok Górny, Rudnik nad Sanem and Ulanów.
