= Golce =

Golce may refer to the following places:

- Golce, Silesian Voivodeship (south Poland)
- Golce, Subcarpathian Voivodeship (south-east Poland)
- Golce, West Pomeranian Voivodeship (north-west Poland)
