= Krzeszów Dolny =

- Village
- Location within Poland
- Coordinates: 50°24′N 22°22′E
- Country: Poland
- Voivodeship: Subcarpathian
- County: Nisko
- Gmina: Krzeszów
- Population: 335

Krzeszów Dolny [ˈkʂɛʂuf ˈdɔlnɨ] is a village in the administrative district of Gmina Krzeszów, within Nisko County, Subcarpathian Voivodeship, in south-eastern Poland.
