= Katy, Poland =

Katy
- Village
- Location within Poland
- Coordinates: 50°35′N 22°16′E
- Country: Poland
- Voivodeship: Subcarpathian
- County: Nisko
- Gmina: Jarocin

Katy [ˈkatɨ] is a village in the administrative district of Gmina Jarocin, within Nisko County, Subcarpathian Voivodeship, in south-eastern Poland.
