= Banachy =

- Village
- Location within Poland
- Coordinates: 50°30′N 22°33′E
- Country: Poland
- Voivodeship: Subcarpathian
- County: Nisko
- Gmina: Harasiuki
- Population: 210

Banachy [baˈnaxɨ] is a village in the administrative district of Gmina Harasiuki, within Nisko County, Subcarpathian Voivodeship, in south-eastern Poland.
