= Zalesie, Nisko County =

Zalesie
- Village
- Location within Poland
- Coordinates: 50°24′N 22°5′E
- Country: Poland
- Voivodeship: Subcarpathian
- County: Nisko
- Gmina: Jeżowe

Zalesie [zaˈlɛɕɛ] is a village in the administrative district of Gmina Jeżowe, within Nisko County, Subcarpathian Voivodeship, in south-eastern Poland.
