= Stary Nart =

- Village
- Location within Poland
- Coordinates: 50°20′59″N 21°59′25″E
- Country: Poland
- Voivodeship: Subcarpathian
- County: Nisko
- Gmina: Jeżowe

Stary Nart [ˈstarɨ ˈnart] is a village in the administrative district of Gmina Jeżowe, within Nisko County, Subcarpathian Voivodeship, in south-eastern Poland.
