= Wolina =

- Village
- Location within Poland
- Coordinates: 50°30′N 22°12′E
- Country: Poland
- Voivodeship: Subcarpathian
- County: Nisko
- Gmina: Nisko
- Population: 440

Wolina [vɔˈlʲina] is a village in the administrative district of Gmina Nisko, within Nisko County, Subcarpathian Voivodeship, in south-eastern Poland.
