= Przędzel =

- Village
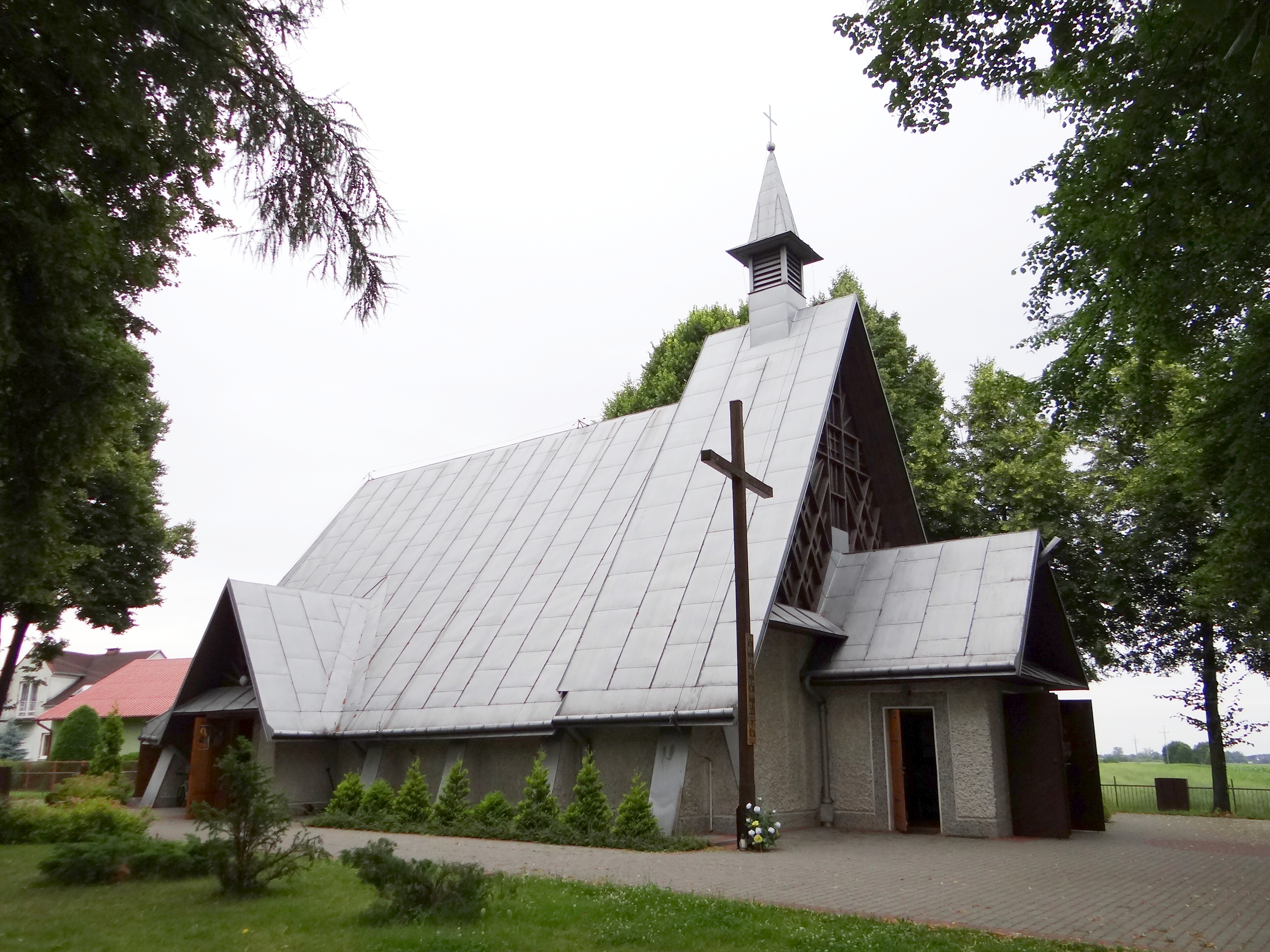
- Church of Our Lady of Sorrows

- Location within Poland
- Coordinates: 50°29′N 22°14′E
- Country: Poland
- Voivodeship: Subcarpathian
- County: Nisko
- Gmina: Rudnik nad Sanem

Przędzel [ˈpʂɛnd͡zɛl] is a village in the administrative district of Gmina Rudnik nad Sanem, within Nisko County, Subcarpathian Voivodeship, in south-eastern Poland.
