= Gmina Jarocin =

Gmina Jarocin may refer to either of the following administrative districts in Poland:

- Gmina Jarocin, Greater Poland Voivodeship
- Gmina Jarocin, Subcarpathian Voivodeship

== See also ==
- Jarocin (disambiguation)
