= Gmina Rudnik nad Sanem =

Gmina Rudnik nad Sanem Rudnik nad Sanem Commune
- Gmina
- Coat of arms
- Interactive map of Gmina Rudnik nad Sanem
- Coordinates (Rudnik nad Sanem): 50°26′38″N 22°14′27″E
- Country: Poland
- Voivodeship: Subcarpathian
- County: Nisko
- Seat: Rudnik nad Sanem

Area
  - Total: 78.71 km^{2} (30.39 sq mi)

Population (2013)
  - Total: 10,320
  - Density: 131.1/km^{2} (339.6/sq mi)
  - Urban: 6,858
  - Rural: 3,462
- Website: http://www.rudnik.pl/

Gmina Rudnik nad Sanem is an urban-rural gmina (administrative district) in Nisko County, Subcarpathian Voivodeship, in south-eastern Poland. Its seat is the town of Rudnik nad Sanem, which lies approximately 13 kilometres (8 mi) south-east of Nisko and 49 km (30 mi) north of the regional capital Rzeszów.

The gmina covers an area of 78.71 square kilometres (30.4 sq mi), and as of 2006 its total population is 10,124 (out of which the population of Rudnik nad Sanem amounts to 6,744, and the population of the rural part of the gmina is 3,380).

== Villages ==
Apart from the town of Rudnik nad Sanem, Gmina Rudnik nad Sanem contains the villages and settlements of Chałupki, Kopki, Przędzel and Przędzel-Kolonia.

== Neighbouring gminas ==
Gmina Rudnik nad Sanem is bordered by the gminas of Jeżowe, Krzeszów, Nisko, Nowa Sarzyna and Ulanów.
