= Sieraków, Podkarpackie Voivodeship =

Sieraków
- Village
- Location within Poland
- Coordinates: 50°28′N 22°26′E
- Country: Poland
- Voivodeship: Subcarpathian
- County: Nisko
- Gmina: Harasiuki
- Population (approx.): 300

Sieraków (Polish pronunciation: [ɕɛˈrakuf]) is a village in the administrative district of Gmina Harasiuki, within Nisko County, Subcarpathian Voivodeship, in south-eastern Poland.
