= Kutyły =

- Village
- Location within Poland
- Coordinates: 50°34′51″N 22°15′19″E
- Country: Poland
- Voivodeship: Subcarpathian
- County: Nisko
- Gmina: Jarocin
- Population: 120

Kutyły [kuˈtɨwɨ] is a village in the administrative district of Gmina Jarocin, within Nisko County, Subcarpathian Voivodeship, in south-eastern Poland.
