= Majdan Golczański =

- Village
- Location within Poland
- Coordinates: 50°34′N 22°21′E
- Country: Poland
- Voivodeship: Subcarpathian
- County: Nisko
- Gmina: Jarocin
- Population (approx.): 685

Majdan Golczański (Polish pronunciation: [ˈmajdaŋ ɡɔlˈtʂaj̃skʲi]) is a village in the administrative district of Gmina Jarocin, within Nisko County, Subcarpathian Voivodeship, in south-eastern Poland.
