= Chałupki, Nisko County =

Chałupki
- Village
- Location within Poland
- Coordinates: 50°25′17″N 22°16′36″E
- Country: Poland
- Voivodeship: Subcarpathian
- County: Nisko
- Gmina: Rudnik nad Sanem
- Population: 316

Chałupki [xaˈwupkʲi] is a village in the administrative district of Gmina Rudnik nad Sanem, within Nisko County, Subcarpathian Voivodeship, in south-eastern Poland.
