= Mostki, Podkarpackie Voivodeship =

Mostki
- Village
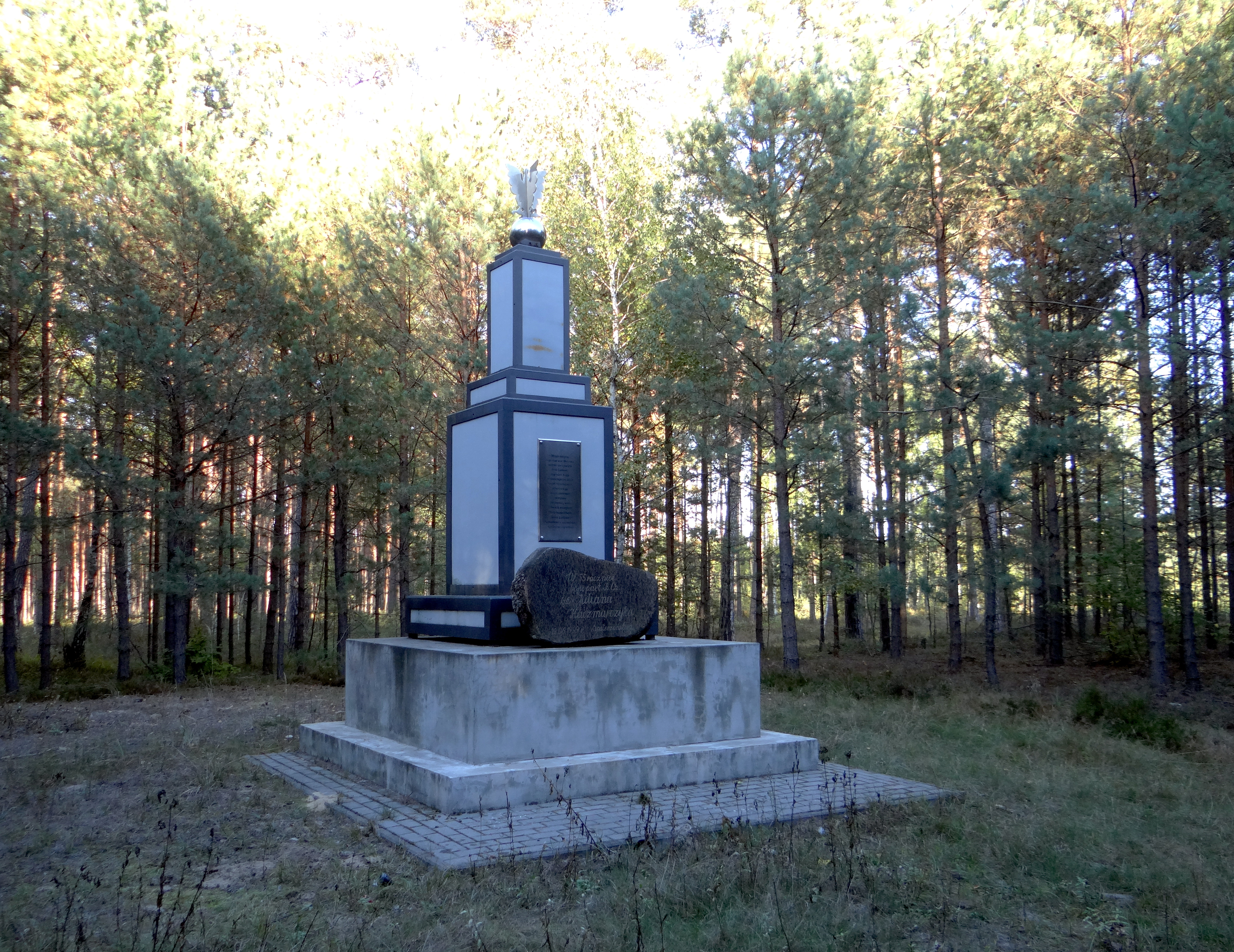
- Memorial of partisans of Peasants' Battalions in Mostki (Graba hamlet)

- Location within Poland
- Coordinates: 50°34′N 22°23′E
- Country: Poland
- Voivodeship: Subcarpathian
- County: Nisko
- Gmina: Jarocin

Mostki [ˈmɔstkʲi] is a village in the administrative district of Gmina Jarocin, within Nisko County, Subcarpathian Voivodeship, in south-eastern Poland. The village is located in the historical region Galicia.

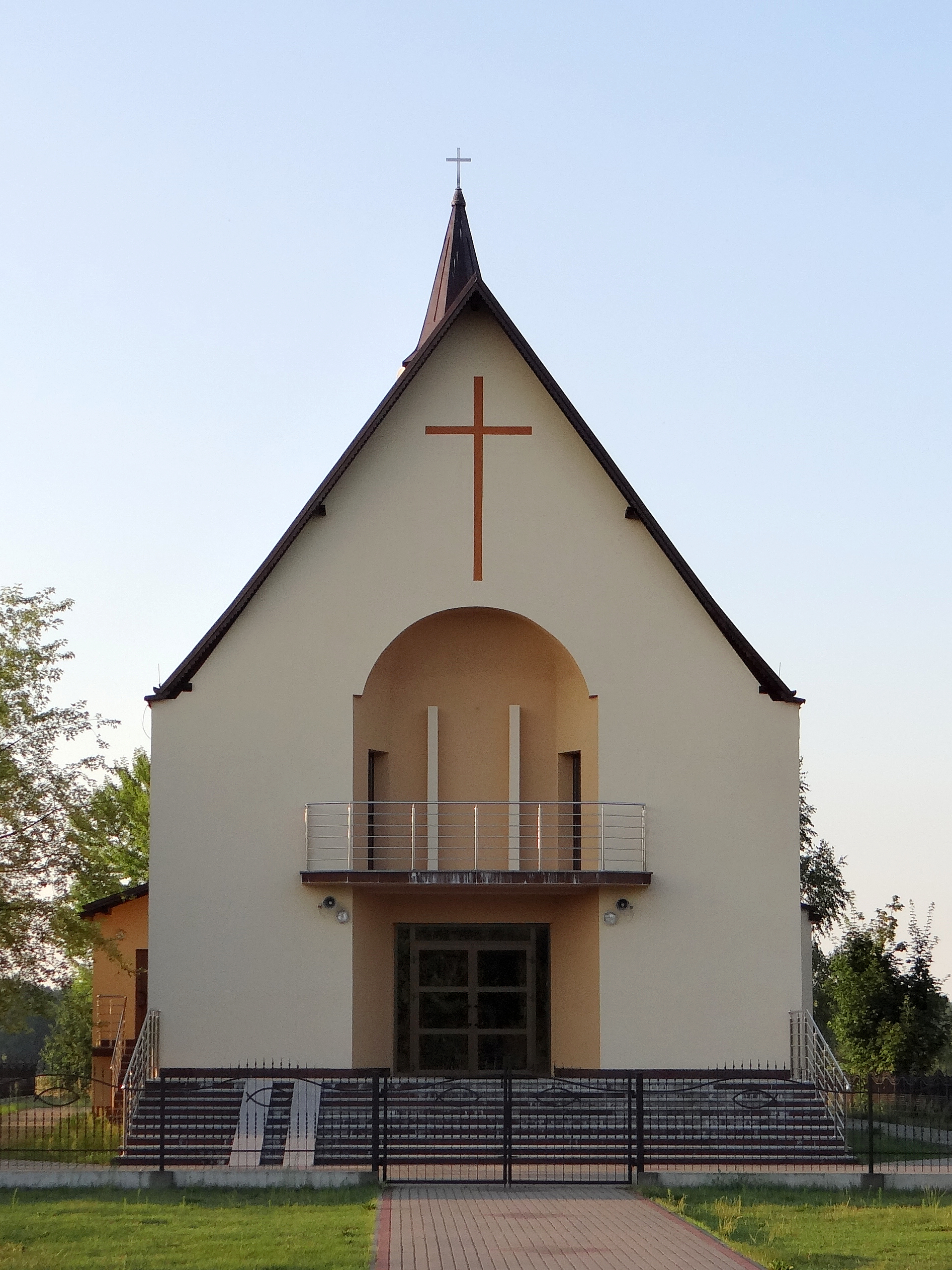
Chapel of the Transfiguration in Mostki (Wasile hamlet)

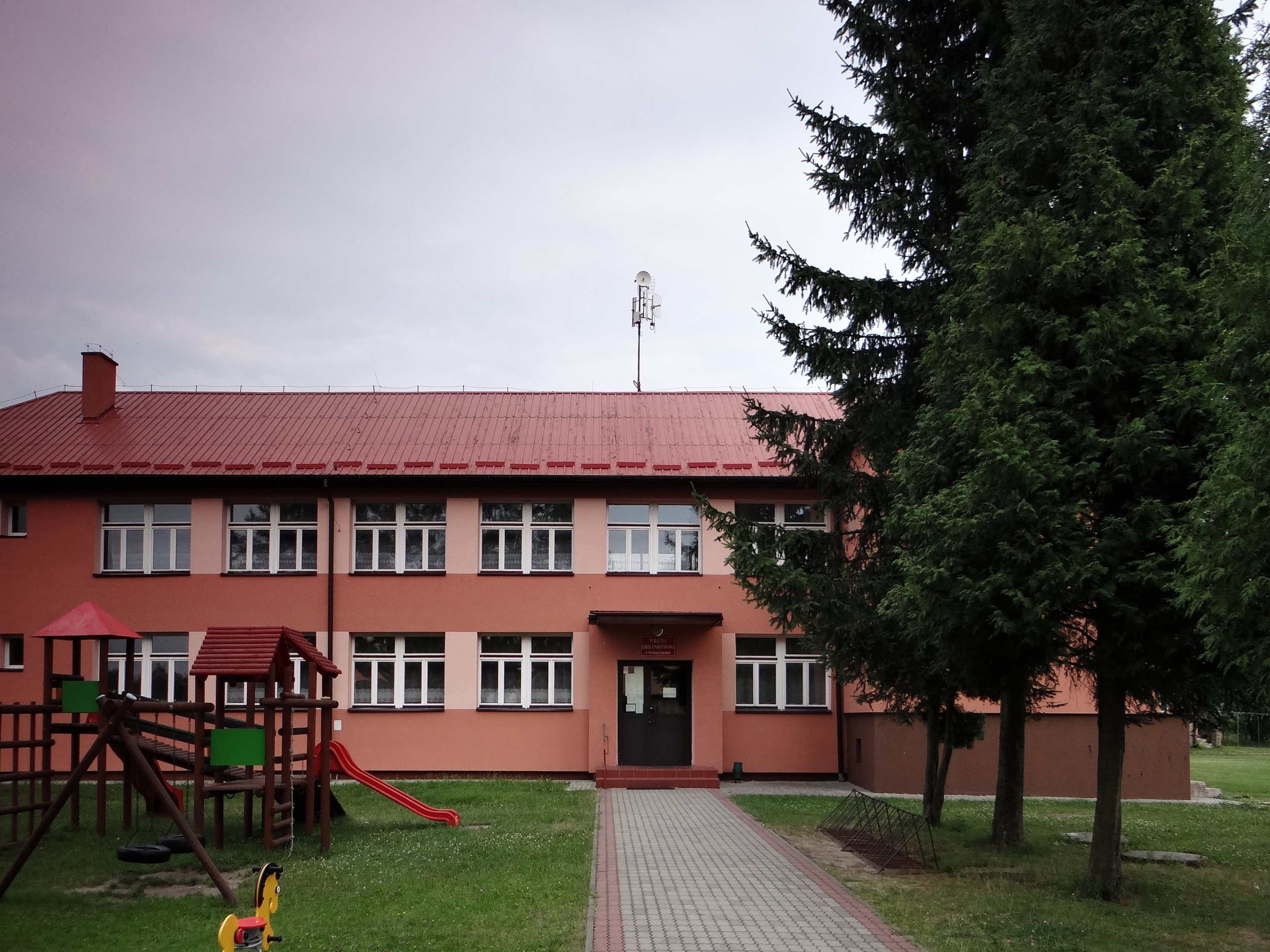
Elementary school
