= Gmina Harasiuki =

Gmina Harasiuki Harasiuki Commune
- Gmina
- Coat of arms
- Interactive map of Gmina Harasiuki
- Coordinates (Harasiuki): 50°29′N 22°29′E
- Country: Poland
- Voivodeship: Subcarpathian
- County: Nisko
- Seat: Harasiuki

Area
  - Total: 168.29 km^{2} (64.98 sq mi)

Population (2013)
  - Total: 6,236
  - Density: 37.06/km^{2} (95.97/sq mi)

Gmina Harasiuki is a rural gmina (administrative district) in Nisko County, Subcarpathian Voivodeship, in south-eastern Poland. Its seat is the village of Harasiuki, which lies approximately 26 kilometres (16 mi) east of Nisko and 61 km (38 mi) north-east of the regional capital Rzeszów.

The gmina covers an area of 168.29 square kilometres (65.0 sq mi), and as of 2006 its total population is 6,392 (6,236 in 2013).

== Villages ==
Gmina Harasiuki contains the villages and settlements of Banachy, Derylaki, Gózd, Harasiuki, Hucisko, Huta Krzeszowska, Huta Podgórna, Krzeszów Górny, Kusze, Łazory, Maziarnia, Nowa Huta, Nowa Wieś, Nowy Żuk, Półsieraków, Rogóźnia, Ryczki, Sieraków, Stara Huta, Stary Żuk, Szeliga and Wólka.

== History ==
Harasiuki comes from the family name of Harasiuk. The Harasiuks were the first family to inhabit the area. For instance, Matthew Harasiuk moved to Ohio and the American version of the name became Harasuk. Both versions of the name were used by the family. No known males heirs remain from this line.

== Neighbouring gminas ==
Gmina Harasiuki is bordered by the gminas of Biłgoraj, Biszcza, Janów Lubelski, Jarocin, Krzeszów, Potok Górny and Ulanów.
