= Sibigi =

- Village
- Location within Poland
- Coordinates: 50°22′37″N 22°14′19″E
- Country: Poland
- Voivodeship: Subcarpathian
- County: Nisko
- Gmina: Jeżowe

Sibigi [ɕiˈbʲiɡʲi] is a village in the administrative district of Gmina Jeżowe, within Nisko County, Subcarpathian Voivodeship, in south-eastern Poland.
