= Nowosielec, Podkarpackie Voivodeship =

Nowosielec
- Village
- Location within Poland
- Coordinates: 50°27′N 22°10′E
- Country: Poland
- Voivodeship: Subcarpathian
- County: Nisko
- Gmina: Nisko
- Population: 1,500
- Website: http://www.nowosielec.pl

Nowosielec [nɔvɔˈɕɛlɛt͡s] is a village in the administrative district of Gmina Nisko, within Nisko County, Subcarpathian Voivodeship, in south-eastern Poland.
