= Battle of Huta Krzeszowska =

The Battle of Huta Krzeszowska was one of many clashes of the January Uprising. It took place on 11 May 1863 near the village of Huta Krzeszowska, which at that time belonged to Russian Empire’s Congress Poland. Insurgent forces commanded by Antoni Jezioranski and Jozef Smiechowski clashed with a detachment of the Imperial Russian Army. The battle ended with Russian victory, after which Poles had to retreat to the nearby Austrian Galicia.

== Sources ==
- Stefan Kieniewicz: Powstanie styczniowe. Warszawa: Państwowe Wydawnictwo Naukowe, 1983. ISBN 83-01-03652-4.
