= Domostawa =

- Village
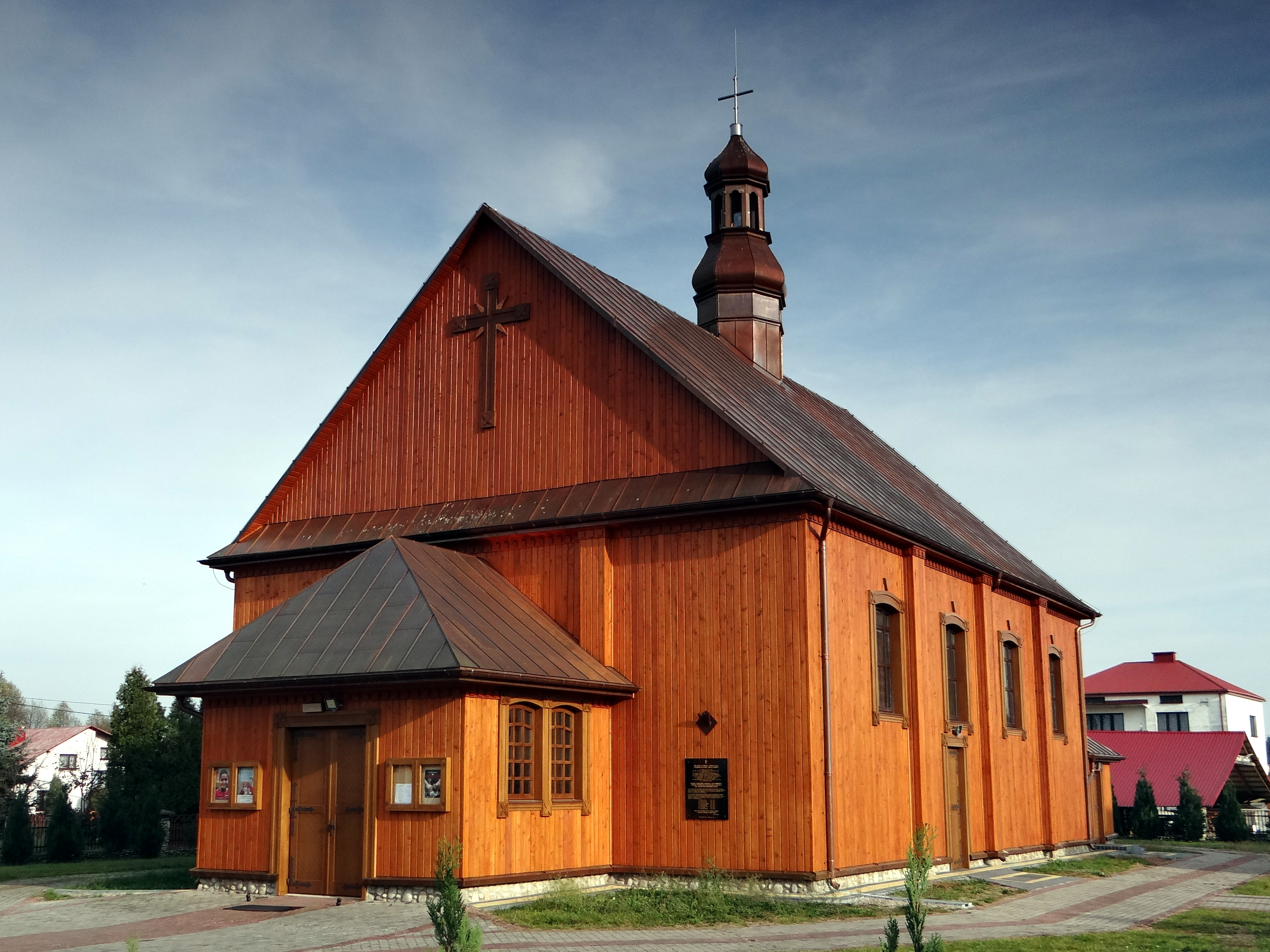

- Location within Poland
- Coordinates: 50°37′N 22°17′E
- Country: Poland
- Voivodeship: Subcarpathian
- County: Nisko
- Gmina: Jarocin

Domostawa [dɔmɔsˈtava] is a village in the administrative district of Gmina Jarocin, within Nisko County, Subcarpathian Voivodeship, in south-eastern Poland.
