= Gmina Jeżowe =

Gmina Jeżowe Jeżowe Commune
- Gmina
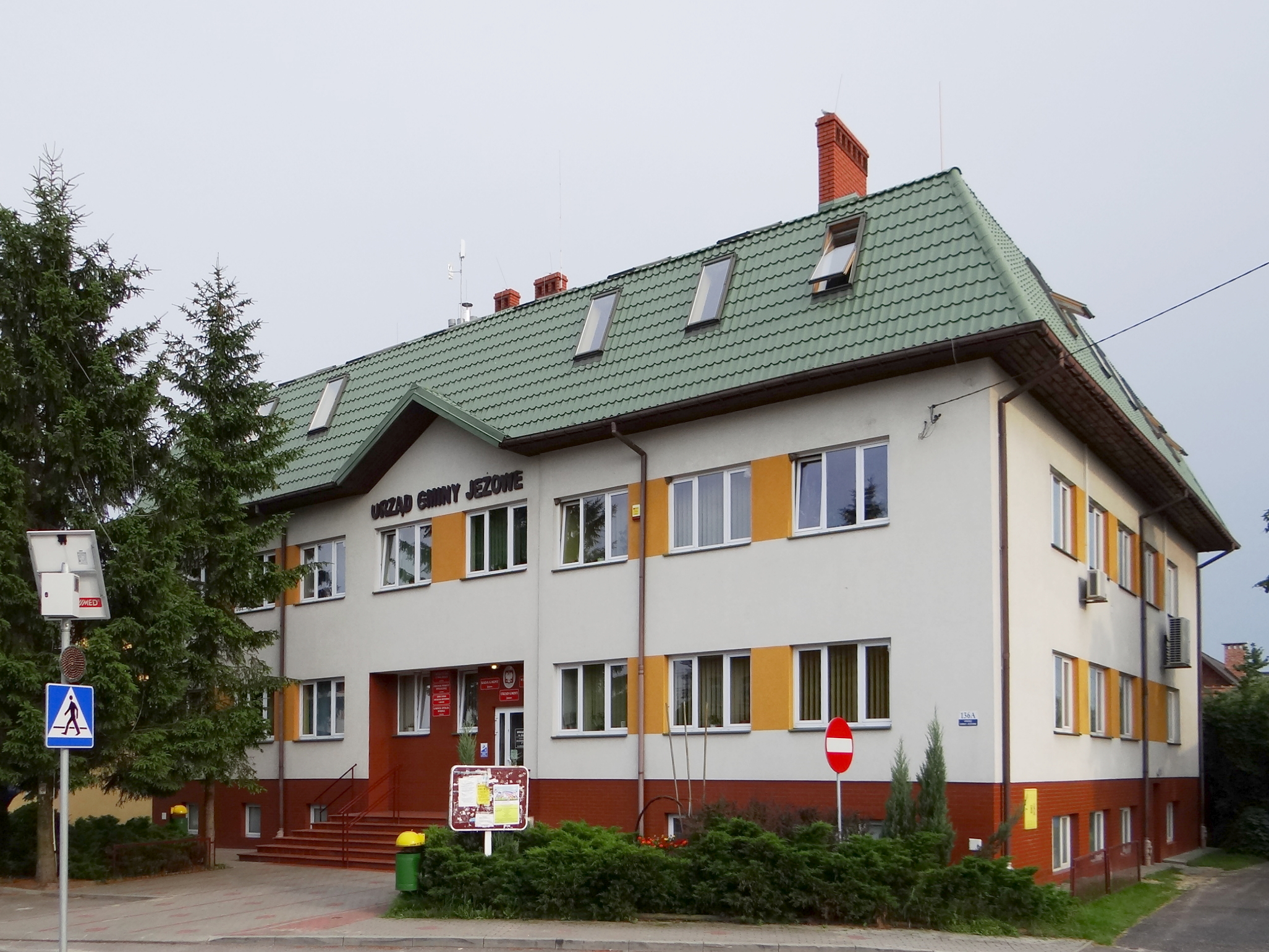
- Gmina Jeżowe Office

- Flag Coat of arms
- Interactive map of Gmina Jeżowe
- Coordinates (Jeżowe): 50°22′31″N 22°8′36″E
- Country: Poland
- Voivodeship: Subcarpathian
- County: Nisko
- Seat: Jeżowe

Area
  - Total: 123.77 km^{2} (47.79 sq mi)

Population (2013)
  - Total: 10,148
  - Density: 81.991/km^{2} (212.36/sq mi)
- Website: http://gmina-jezowe.pl

Gmina Jeżowe is a rural gmina (administrative district) in Nisko County, Subcarpathian Voivodeship, in south-eastern Poland. Its seat is the village of Jeżowe, which lies approximately 18 kilometres (11 mi) south of Nisko and 40 km (25 mi) north of the regional capital Rzeszów.

The gmina covers an area of 123.77 square kilometres (47.8 sq mi), and as of 2006 its total population is 9,871 (10,148 in 2013).

== Villages ==
Gmina Jeżowe contains the villages and settlements of Cholewiana Góra, Groble, Jata, Jeżowe, Krzywdy, Nowy Nart, Pogorzałka, Sibigi, Sójkowa, Stary Nart and Zalesie.

== Neighbouring gminas ==
Gmina Jeżowe is bordered by the gminas of Bojanów, Dzikowiec, Kamień, Nisko, Nowa Sarzyna, Raniżów and Rudnik nad Sanem.

== International Relations ==
=== Twin Towns And Sister Cities/Regions ===
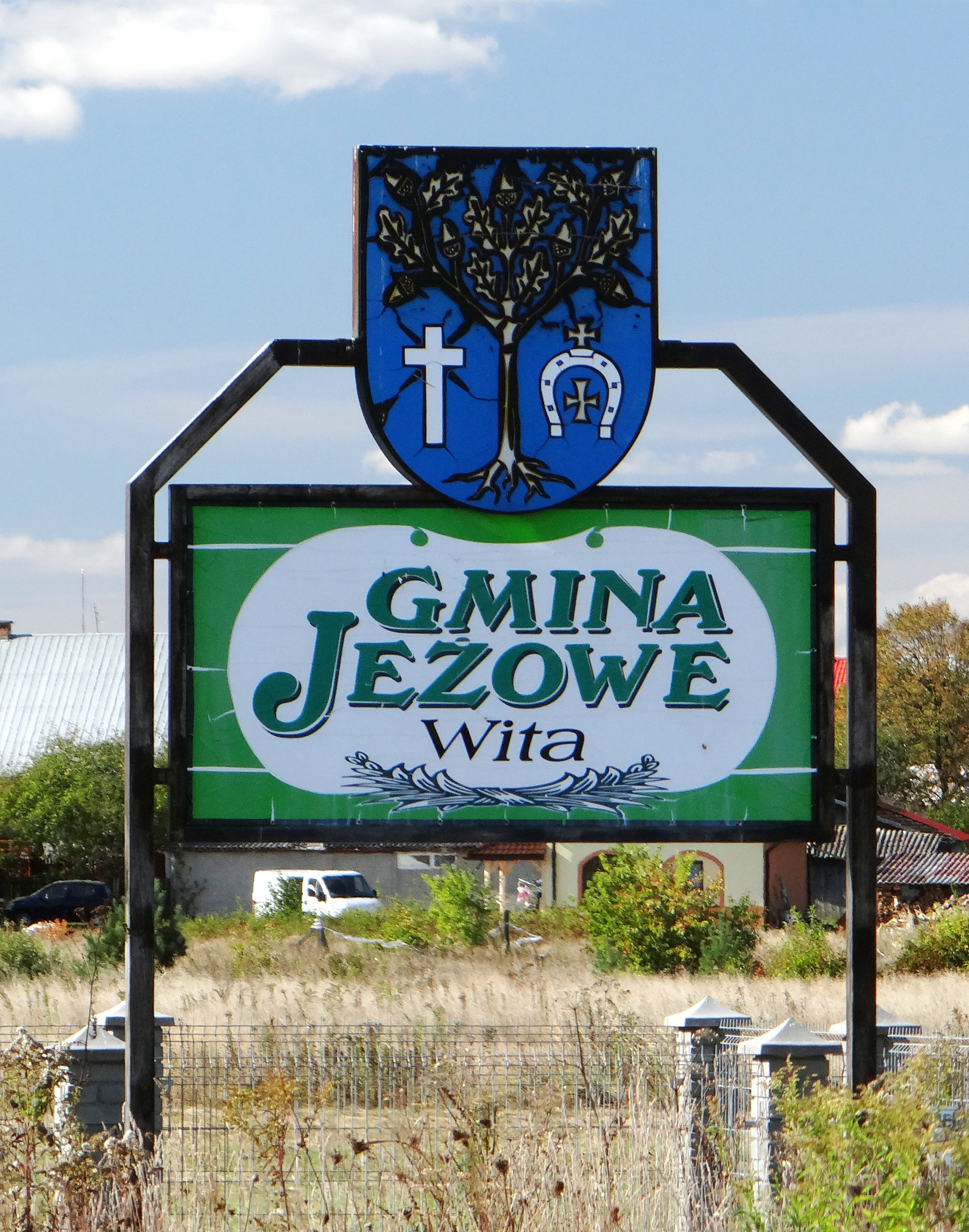
- "Welcome to Gmina Jeżowe" in Groble
  Drohobych Raion In Ukraine
- Atzenbrugg Community In Austria
