= Zuk =

Zuk may refer to:

- Zuk (surname)
- Zuk, Iran, a village in Iran
- FSC Żuk, a Polish motor vehicle
- ZUK Mobile, a smartphone company owned by Chinese technology company Lenovo

== See also ==
- Zhuk (disambiguation)
