= Nowy Nart =

- Village
- Location within Poland
- Coordinates: 50°21′N 22°0′E
- Country: Poland
- Voivodeship: Subcarpathian
- County: Nisko
- Gmina: Jeżowe

Nowy Nart [ˈnɔvɨ ˈnart] is a village in the administrative district of Gmina Jeżowe, within Nisko County, Subcarpathian Voivodeship, in south-eastern Poland.
