= Derylaki =

- Village
- Location within Poland
- Coordinates: 50°29′N 22°28′E
- Country: Poland
- Voivodeship: Subcarpathian
- County: Nisko
- Gmina: Harasiuki

Derylaki [dɛrɨˈlakʲi] is a village in the administrative district of Gmina Harasiuki, within Nisko County, Subcarpathian Voivodeship, in south-eastern Poland.
