= Jarocin (disambiguation) =

Jarocin may refer to the following places:

- Jarocin in Greater Poland Voivodeship (west-central Poland)
- Jarocin, Masovian Voivodeship (east-central Poland)
- Jarocin, Subcarpathian Voivodeship (south-east Poland)
- Jarocin, Warmian-Masurian Voivodeship (north Poland)

== See also ==
- Gmina Jarocin (disambiguation)
