= Kamionka, Nisko County =

Kamionka
- Village
- Location within Poland
- Coordinates: 50°25′35″N 22°20′19″E
- Country: Poland
- Voivodeship: Subcarpathian
- County: Nisko
- Gmina: Krzeszów
- Population: 899

Kamionka [kaˈmʲɔŋka] is a village in the administrative district of Gmina Krzeszów, within Nisko County, Subcarpathian Voivodeship, in south-eastern Poland.
