= Hucisko, Nisko County =

Hucisko
- Village
- Location within Poland
- Coordinates: 50°26′N 22°23′E
- Country: Poland
- Voivodeship: Subcarpathian
- County: Nisko
- Gmina: Harasiuki

Hucisko [xuˈt͡ɕiskɔ] is a village in the administrative district of Gmina Harasiuki, within Nisko County, Subcarpathian Voivodeship, in south-eastern Poland.
