= Bystre, Nisko County =

Bystre
- Village
- Location within Poland
- Coordinates: 50°22′42″N 22°23′48″E
- Country: Poland
- Voivodeship: Subcarpathian
- County: Nisko
- Gmina: Krzeszów
- Population: 585

Bystre [ˈbɨstrɛ] is a village in the administrative district of Gmina Krzeszów, within Nisko County, Subcarpathian Voivodeship, in south-eastern Poland.
