= Zdziary =

- Village
- Location within Poland
- Coordinates: 50°34′16″N 22°15′39″E
- Country: Poland
- Voivodeship: Subcarpathian
- County: Nisko
- Gmina: Jarocin
- Population: 510

Zdziary [ˈzd͡ʑarɨ] (until 2012 Ździary) is a village in the administrative district of Gmina Jarocin, within Nisko County, Subcarpathian Voivodeship, in south-eastern Poland.

== History ==
As a result of the battles from World War I, the fallen soldiers were buried in the village. On 10 July 1943, the Wehrmacht and SS pacified the village. The Germans murdered Stefan Maśloch and deported about 30 residents to concentration camps.

From 1975 to 1998, the village was administratively part of the Tarnobrzeg Voivodeship.

On 1 January 2013, the village's name was standardized by changing the spelling to include the letter "Ź". At the initiative of the municipality, the name of the settlement was changed to Zdziary by a regulation from the Minister of Administration and Digitization, which was published at the end of the previous year.

== LZS Zdziary ==
The village is a home for the LZS Zdziary football team. As of the 2023–24 season, they compete in the regional league. In 2021, they reached the Subcarpathian-Stalowa Wola Polish Cup final.
