= Kustrawa =

- Village
- Location within Poland
- Coordinates: 50°23′N 22°23′E
- Country: Poland
- Voivodeship: Subcarpathian
- County: Nisko
- Gmina: Krzeszów
- Population: 198

Kustrawa [kusˈtrava] is a village in the administrative district of Gmina Krzeszów, within Nisko County, Subcarpathian Voivodeship, in south-eastern Poland.

== History ==
According to a historical survey included in the spatial development study of Gmina Krzeszów, Kustrawa was established during the 14th or early 15th century. Historical records also identify the settlement under the alternative name Kustrawica. In the 19th century, it was administratively part of Biłgoraj County and belonged to the Zamoyski family entail, a large landed estate in southeastern Poland.
