= Jata, Podkarpackie Voivodeship =

Jata
- Village
- Location within Poland
- Coordinates: 50°23′N 22°4′E
- Country: Poland
- Voivodeship: Subcarpathian
- County: Nisko
- Gmina: Jeżowe
- Population (approx.): 600

Jata [ˈjata] is a village in the administrative district of Gmina Jeżowe, within Nisko County, Subcarpathian Voivodeship, in south-eastern Poland.
