= Nowa Wieś, Gmina Nisko =

Nowa Wieś
- Village
- Location within Poland
- Coordinates: 50°31′35″N 22°12′0″E
- Country: Poland
- Voivodeship: Subcarpathian
- County: Nisko
- Gmina: Nisko
- Population: 330

Nowa Wieś [ˈnɔva ˈvʲɛɕ] is a village in the administrative district of Gmina Nisko, within Nisko County, Subcarpathian Voivodeship, in south-eastern Poland.
