= Kopki, Podkarpackie Voivodeship =

Kopki
- Village
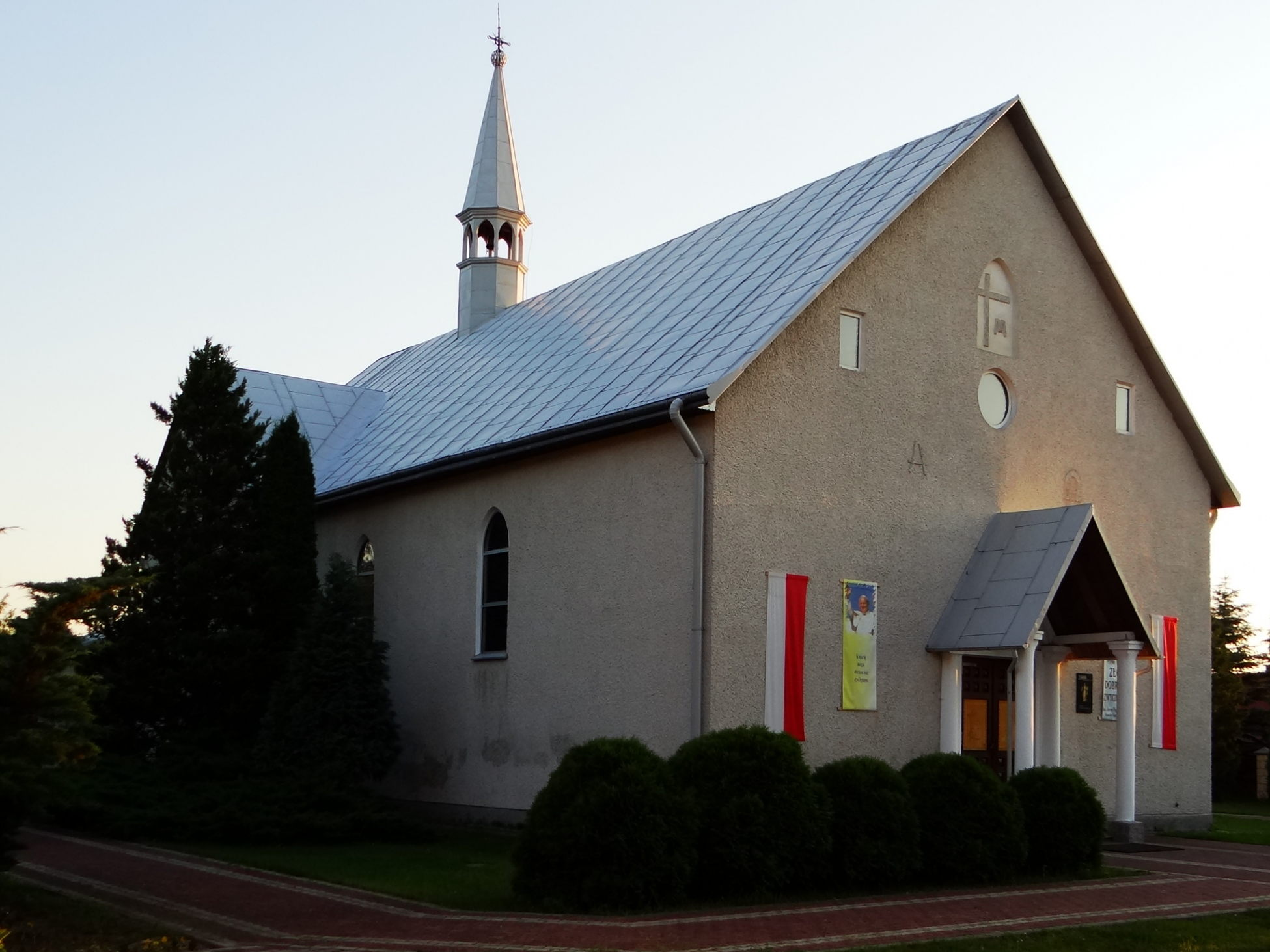
- Church of Saint Martin

- Location within Poland
- Coordinates: 50°25′N 22°19′E
- Country: Poland
- Voivodeship: Subcarpathian
- County: Nisko
- Gmina: Rudnik nad Sanem

Kopki [ˈkɔpkʲi] is a village in the administrative district of Gmina Rudnik nad Sanem, within Nisko County, Subcarpathian Voivodeship, in south-eastern Poland.
