= Zuk (surname) =

Zuk, Żuk, or Žuk is a surname. Notable people with the surname include:

- Eva Zuk (born 1991), Polish model
- Eva Maria Zuk (1945–2017), Polish-Mexican classical pianist
- Judith D. Zuk (1951–2007), American horticulturist and conservationist
- Kacper Żuk (born 1999), Polish tennis player
- Kamila Żuk (born 1997), Polish biathlete
- Krzysztof Żuk (born 1957), Polish economist and politician
- Paweł Żuk (disambiguation), two Polish footballers
- Vincent Žuk-Hryškievič (1903–1989), Belarusian politician
- Marlene Zuk (born 1956), American biologist and ecologist
- Wayne Zuk (born 1949), Canadian ice hockey player

Fictional characters:

- Georges Zuk, created by British writer Robin Skelton

== See also ==
- Zhuk (surname) (also spelled Żuk and Žuk)
