= Kończyce, Podkarpackie Voivodeship =

Kończyce
- Village
- Location within Poland
- Coordinates: 50°25′N 22°9′E
- Country: Poland
- Voivodeship: Subcarpathian
- County: Nisko
- Gmina: Nisko

Kończyce [kɔɲˈt͡ʂɨt͡sɛ] is a village in the administrative district of Gmina Nisko, within Nisko County, Subcarpathian Voivodeship, in south-eastern Poland.
