= Nowa Wieś, Gmina Harasiuki =

Nowa Wieś
- Village
- Location within Poland
- Coordinates: 50°25′29″N 22°24′55″E
- Country: Poland
- Voivodeship: Subcarpathian
- County: Nisko
- Gmina: Harasiuki
- Population: 350

Nowa Wieś [ˈnɔva ˈvʲɛɕ] is a village in the administrative district of Gmina Harasiuki, within Nisko County, Subcarpathian Voivodeship, in south-eastern Poland.
