= Krzywdy =

- Village
- Location within Poland
- Coordinates: 50°21′17″N 22°12′21″E
- Country: Poland
- Voivodeship: Subcarpathian
- County: Nisko
- Gmina: Jeżowe

Krzywdy [ˈkʂɨvdɨ] is a village in the administrative district of Gmina Jeżowe, within Nisko County, Subcarpathian Voivodeship, in south-eastern Poland.
