= Łazów, Podkarpackie Voivodeship =

Łazów
- Village
- Location within Poland
- Coordinates: 50°20′59″N 22°25′34″E
- Country: Poland
- Voivodeship: Subcarpathian
- County: Nisko
- Gmina: Krzeszów
- Population: 265

Łazów [ˈwazuf] is a village in the administrative district of Gmina Krzeszów, within Nisko County, Subcarpathian Voivodeship, in south-eastern Poland.
