= Szeliga (disambiguation) =

Szeliga is a village in Poland.

Szeliga may also refer to:

- Szeliga (surname)
- Szeliga coat of arms
