= Pogorzałka, Podkarpackie Voivodeship =

Pogorzałka
- Village
- Location within Poland
- Coordinates: 50°22′19″N 22°3′17″E
- Country: Poland
- Voivodeship: Subcarpathian
- County: Nisko
- Gmina: Jeżowe
- Population: 150

Pogorzałka [pɔɡɔˈʐau̯ka] is a village in the administrative district of Gmina Jeżowe, within Nisko County, Subcarpathian Voivodeship, in south-eastern Poland.
