= Sigiełki =

- Village
- Location within Poland
- Coordinates: 50°22′12″N 22°24′34″E
- Country: Poland
- Voivodeship: Subcarpathian
- County: Nisko
- Gmina: Krzeszów
- Population: 173

Sigiełki [ɕiˈɡʲɛu̯kʲi] is a village in the administrative district of Gmina Krzeszów, within Nisko County, Subcarpathian Voivodeship, in south-eastern Poland.
