= Groble, Podkarpackie Voivodeship =

Groble
- Village
- Location within Poland
- Coordinates: 50°22′2″N 22°13′4″E
- Country: Poland
- Voivodeship: Subcarpathian
- County: Nisko
- Gmina: Jeżowe

Groble [ˈɡrɔblɛ] is a village in the administrative district of Gmina Jeżowe, within Nisko County, Subcarpathian Voivodeship, in south-eastern Poland.
