= Podolszynka Plebańska =

- Village
- Location within Poland
- Coordinates: 50°25′N 22°23′E
- Country: Poland
- Voivodeship: Subcarpathian
- County: Nisko
- Gmina: Krzeszów
- Population: 208

Podolszynka Plebańska [pɔdɔlˈʂɨŋka plɛˈbaɲska] is a village in the administrative district of Gmina Krzeszów, within Nisko County, Subcarpathian Voivodeship, in south-eastern Poland.
