= Przędzel-Kolonia =

- Village
- Location within Poland
- Coordinates: 50°28′29″N 22°14′58″E
- Country: Poland
- Voivodeship: Podkarpackie
- County: Nisko
- Gmina: Rudnik nad Sanem
- Population: 325

Przędzel-Kolonia [ˈpʂɛnd͡zɛl kɔˈlɔɲa] is a village in the administrative district of Gmina Rudnik nad Sanem, within Nisko County, Podkarpackie Voivodeship, in south-eastern Poland.
