= Krzeszów Górny =

- Village
- Location within Poland
- Coordinates: 50°25′N 22°24′E
- Country: Poland
- Voivodeship: Subcarpathian
- County: Nisko
- Gmina: Harasiuki

Krzeszów Górny [ˈkʂɛʂuf ˈɡurnɨ] is a village in the administrative district of Gmina Harasiuki, within Nisko County, Subcarpathian Voivodeship, in south-eastern Poland.
