= Szwedy =

- Village
- Location within Poland
- Coordinates: 50°37′8″N 22°13′45″E
- Country: Poland
- Voivodeship: Subcarpathian
- County: Nisko
- Gmina: Jarocin
- Population: 300

Szwedy [ˈʂfɛdɨ] is a village in the administrative district of Gmina Jarocin, within Nisko County, Subcarpathian Voivodeship, in south-eastern Poland.
