= Gmina Nisko =

Gmina Nisko Nisko Commune
- Gmina
- Coat of arms
- Interactive map of Gmina Nisko
- Coordinates (Nisko): 50°32′N 22°8′E
- Country: Poland
- Voivodeship: Subcarpathian
- County: Nisko
- Seat: Nisko

Area
  - Total: 142.44 km^{2} (55.00 sq mi)

Population (2013)
  - Total: 22,493
  - Density: 157.91/km^{2} (408.99/sq mi)
  - Urban: 15,484
  - Rural: 7,009
- Website: http://www.nisko.pl/

Gmina Nisko is an urban-rural gmina (administrative district) in Nisko County, Subcarpathian Voivodeship, in south-eastern Poland. Its seat is the town of Nisko, which lies approximately 57 kilometres (35 mi) north of the regional capital Rzeszów.

The gmina covers an area of 142.44 square kilometres (55.0 sq mi), and as of 2006 its total population is 22,503 (out of which the population of Nisko amounts to 15,637, and the population of the rural part of the gmina is 6,866).

== Villages ==
Apart from the town of Nisko, Gmina Nisko contains the villages and settlements of Kończyce, Nowa Wieś, Nowosielec, Racławice, Wolina and Zarzecze.

== Neighbouring gminas ==
Gmina Nisko is bordered by the town of Stalowa Wola and by the gminas of Bojanów, Jeżowe, Pysznica, Rudnik nad Sanem and Ulanów.
