= Harasiuki =

- Village
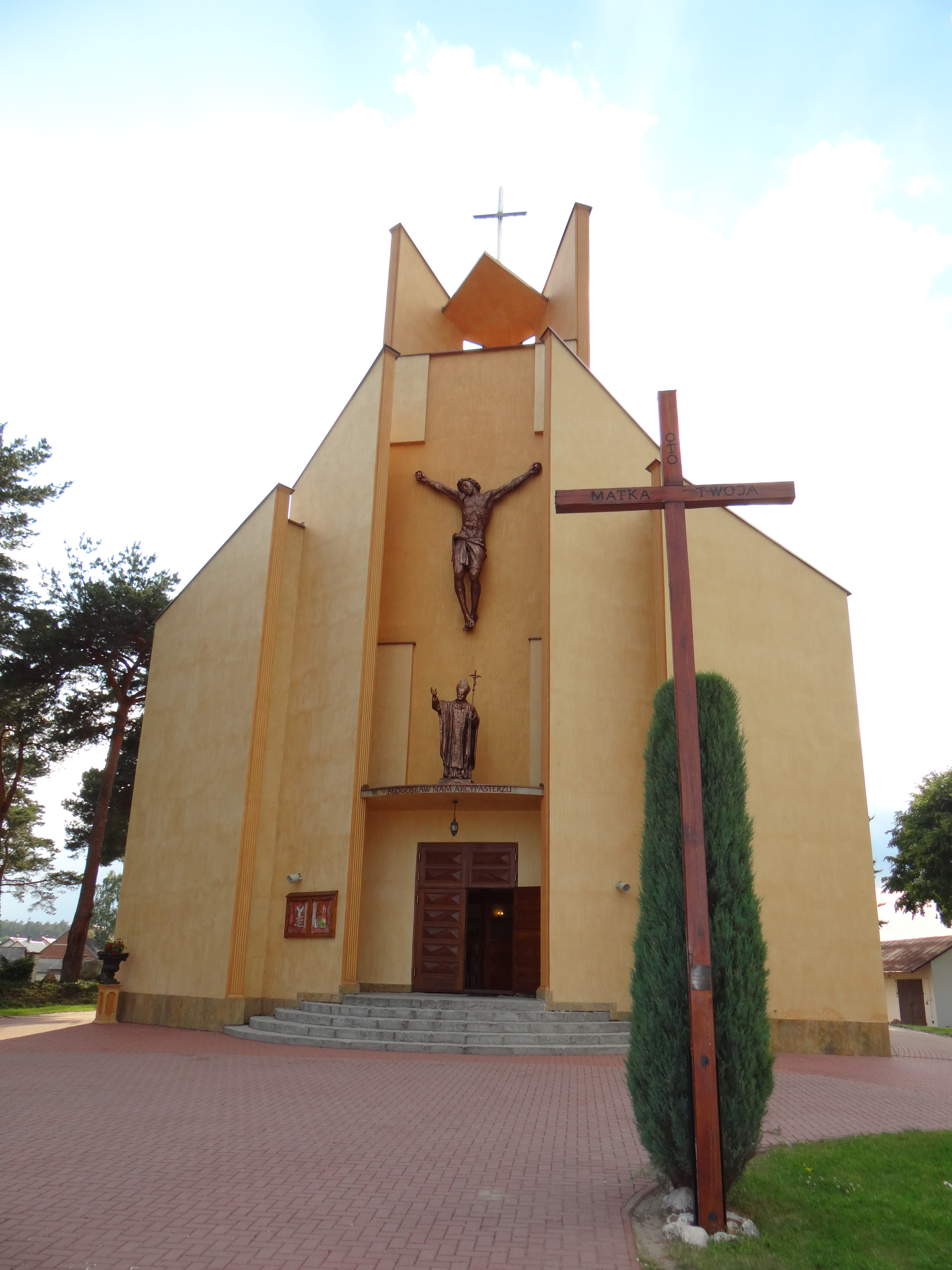
- Church

- Location within Poland
- Coordinates: 50°29′N 22°29′E
- Country: Poland
- Voivodeship: Subcarpathian
- County: Nisko
- Gmina: Harasiuki
- Population: 862

Harasiuki [xaraˈɕukʲi] is a village in Nisko County, Subcarpathian Voivodeship, in south-eastern Poland. It is the seat of the gmina (administrative district) called Gmina Harasiuki.
