= Nisko railway station =

Railway station in Nisko, Poland

Coordinates: 50.5136°N 22.1426°E

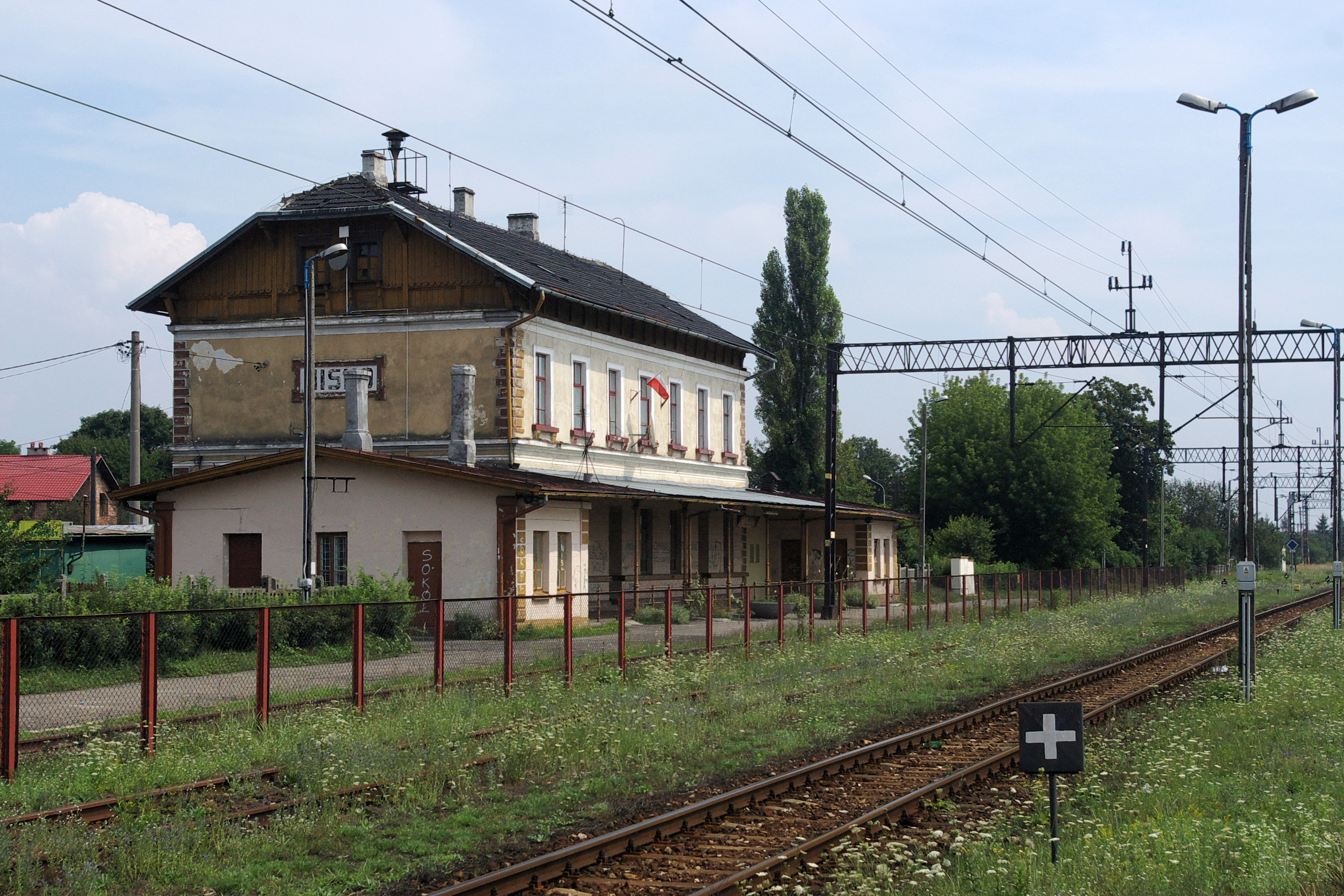
Nisko railway station

Nisko is a railway station in Nisko, Subcarpathian Voivodeship, Poland. In addition to the station building and the platform, there is a 400-meter-long goods ramp at the station.

== History ==
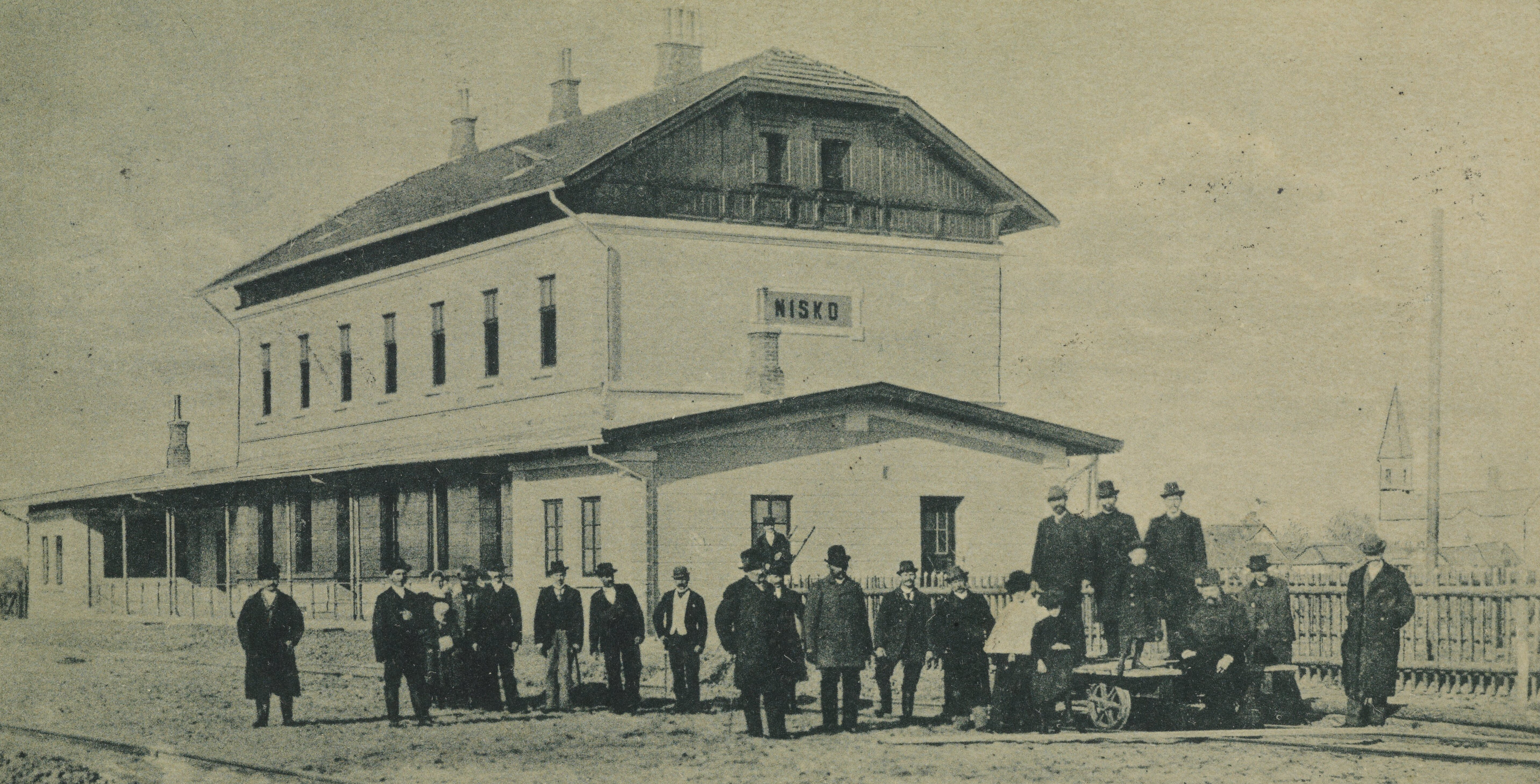
Train station ca 1900

The station building, constructed in 1899 according to a typical design of the former Austro-Hungarian railways, has architectural and historic value.

Until the end of the 1990s, the station had a single-track siding to a sawmill and a military unit with a passing loop located between 1000-lecia and Sandomierska Streets. The remains of the track can now be found near the buildings of the former sawmill. Despite the electrification of the lines in 1989, shaped semaphores are still used at the station. In 2017, the station served 50-99 passengers a day.

== Building condition and planned renovation as of 2025 ==
By 2025 the station building displays clear signs of ageing and functional lag:

- The façade and roof structure remain largely historic but require thermal modernisation and repair of masonry.
- Internal spaces (waiting rooms, toilets, access routes) do not fully comply with current accessibility standards.
- Despite low passenger numbers, local stakeholders view the building as transport-node asset for the region.
- In 2025 the investor, Polish State Railways, is engaged in design works and tender preparation rather than construction. In July 2025 the procurement for the contract engineer (inżynier kontraktu) was launched.

Following a change in national government (post-2023 elections) and consequent ministerial reshuffle, the station’s original inclusion in the “Program Inwestycji Dworcowych 2016-2023” (lit. 'Railway Station Investment Programme 2016–2023') was revoked. The building was removed from the list of priority investments citing revised financial priorities of the new administration. Nevertheless, subsequent statements by the deputy minister for infrastructure in early 2025 reaffirmed that the station remains subject to modernisation, albeit under a modified scope and timeline (completion estimated Q3 2027, budget approx. PLN 12.5 m). If realised, the renovation will transform the station building into a modern, accessible transport hub while retaining historic architectural details. The project foresees re-use of parter for passenger services, installation of digital information boards and elimination of architectural barriers (ramps, Braille signage).

== Domestic train services ==
The station offers connections to Lublin, Rzeszów, Stalowa Wola, Szczecin, Warsaw and Wrocław.
