= Huta Krzeszowska =

- Village
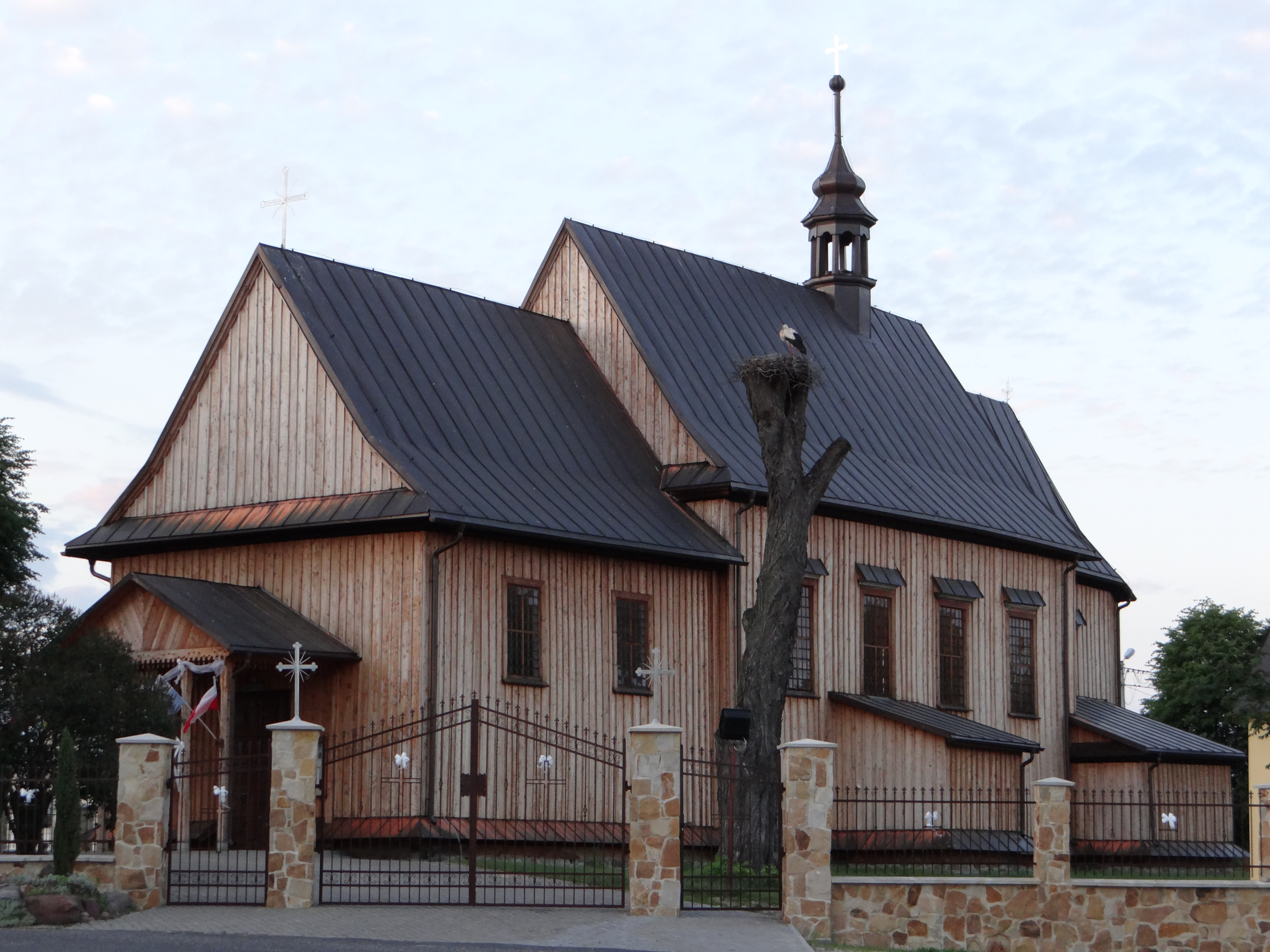
- Church

- Location within Poland
- Coordinates: 50°32′N 22°27′E
- Country: Poland
- Voivodeship: Subcarpathian
- County: Nisko
- Gmina: Harasiuki

Huta Krzeszowska [ˈxuta kʂɛˈʂɔfska] is a village in the administrative district of Gmina Harasiuki, within Nisko County, Subcarpathian Voivodeship, in south-eastern Poland.
