= Krzeszów, Podkarpackie Voivodeship =

Krzeszów
- Village
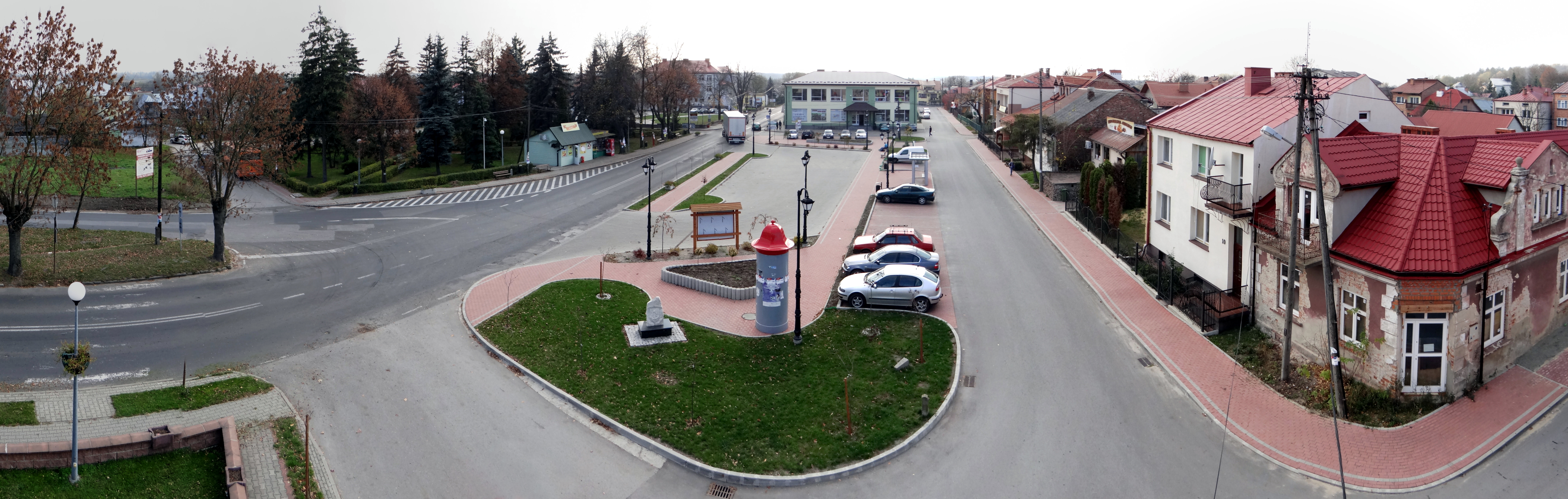
- Centre of the village

- Location within Poland
- Coordinates: 50°24′14″N 22°20′28″E
- Country: Poland
- Voivodeship: Subcarpathian
- County: Nisko
- Gmina: Krzeszów
- Population: 862 (2,005)
- Website: http://www.krzeszow.pl

Krzeszów [ˈkʂɛʂuf] is a village in Nisko County, Subcarpathian Voivodeship, in south-eastern Poland. It is the seat of the gmina (administrative district) called Gmina Krzeszów.
