= Żuk Stary =

- Village
- Location within Poland
- Coordinates: 50°30′16″N 22°23′15″E
- Country: Poland
- Voivodeship: Subcarpathian
- County: Nisko
- Gmina: Harasiuki

Żuk Stary [ˈʐuk'-starɨ] is a village in the administrative district of Gmina Harasiuki, within Nisko County, Subcarpathian Voivodeship, in south-eastern Poland.
