= Golce, Podkarpackie Voivodeship =

Golce
- Village
- Location within Poland
- Coordinates: 50°32′36″N 22°23′20″E
- Country: Poland
- Voivodeship: Subcarpathian
- County: Nisko
- Gmina: Jarocin

Golce [ˈɡɔlt͡sɛ] is a village in the administrative district of Gmina Jarocin, within Nisko County, Subcarpathian Voivodeship, in south-eastern Poland. The village is located in the historical region Galicia.
