= Jan Maria Gisges =

Polish writer

- Born: January 15, 1914; Nisko, Congress Poland
- Died: 17 December 1983 (aged 69); Warsaw, Polish People's Republic
- Resting place: Powązki Military Cemetery
- Citizenship: Poland
- Education: University of Warsaw
- Occupations: Writer, poet, dramatist
- Political party: United People's Party
- Awards: Order of the Banner of Labour, Order of Polonia Restituta, Cross of Merit, Medal of the 10th Anniversary of People's Poland

Jan Maria Gisges (15 January 1914, in Nisko – 17 December 1983, in Warsaw) was a Polish poet, prose writer and dramatist.

== Biography ==
He studied philology of Polish at University of Warsaw. Between 1943 and 1945 he was imprisoned by German Nazis in Auschwitz-Birkenau and other Nazi concentration camps.

During the war he worked as a worker, actively participating in the fight against the occupier. Imprisoned in Nazi concentration camps: Auschwitz-Birkenau (1943–1945), Buchenwald, Ohrdruf, Flossenbürg.

From 1945 he was a member of the People's Party, later of the United People's Party. In the years 1945–1949 he lived in Kielce, where he was an employee of the Kielce Voivodeship Office. He organized cultural and literary life in Kielce, and was also the editor of the regional monthly "Cychry". He made his debut in 1949 in the press as a poet. From 1949 he lived in Warsaw, where he worked as the Head of the Literature Department of the Ministry of Culture and Art and published his first poems in the official media. In the years 1957–1960 he was a member of the editorial team of the weekly "Orka". He was a member of the Polish Writers' Union.

In 1971 he received the Association of Trade Unions Publishing Institute Award for the novel Śmiech.

He was the husband of Anna née Strycharska (1913–2006)[3], the father of Ewa Zwierzchowska-Gisges[4] and Małgorzata[5].
