= Gmina Jarocin, Podkarpackie Voivodeship =

Gmina Jarocin Jarocin Commune
- Gmina
- Flag Coat of arms
- Interactive map of Gmina Jarocin
- Coordinates (Jarocin): 50°33′52″N 22°19′10″E
- Country: Poland
- Voivodeship: Subcarpathian
- County: Nisko
- Seat: Jarocin

Area
  - Total: 90.43 km^{2} (34.92 sq mi)

Population (2013)
  - Total: 5,444
  - Density: 60.20/km^{2} (155.9/sq mi)
- Website: http://www.kki.pl/jarocin

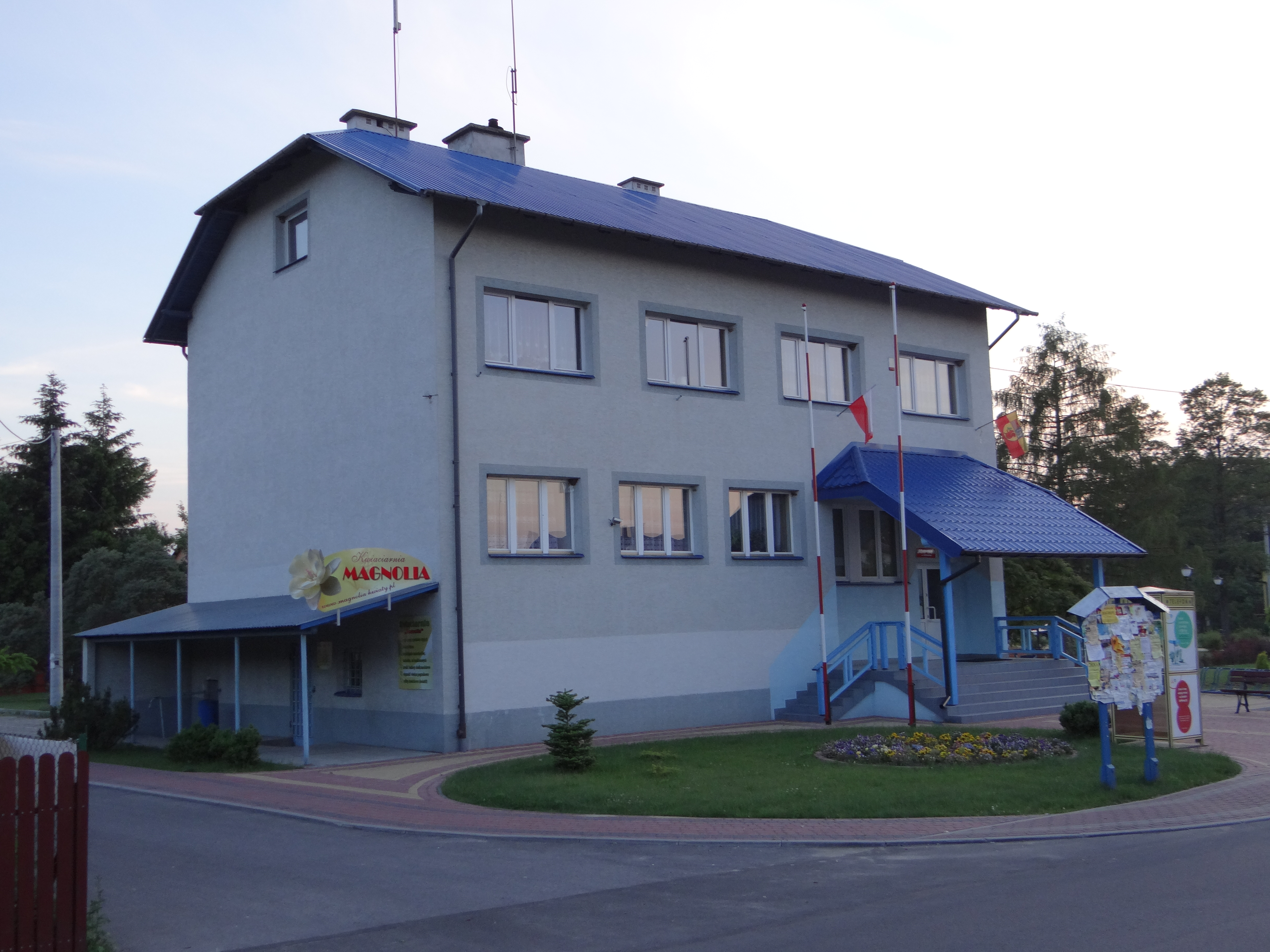
Gmina Office

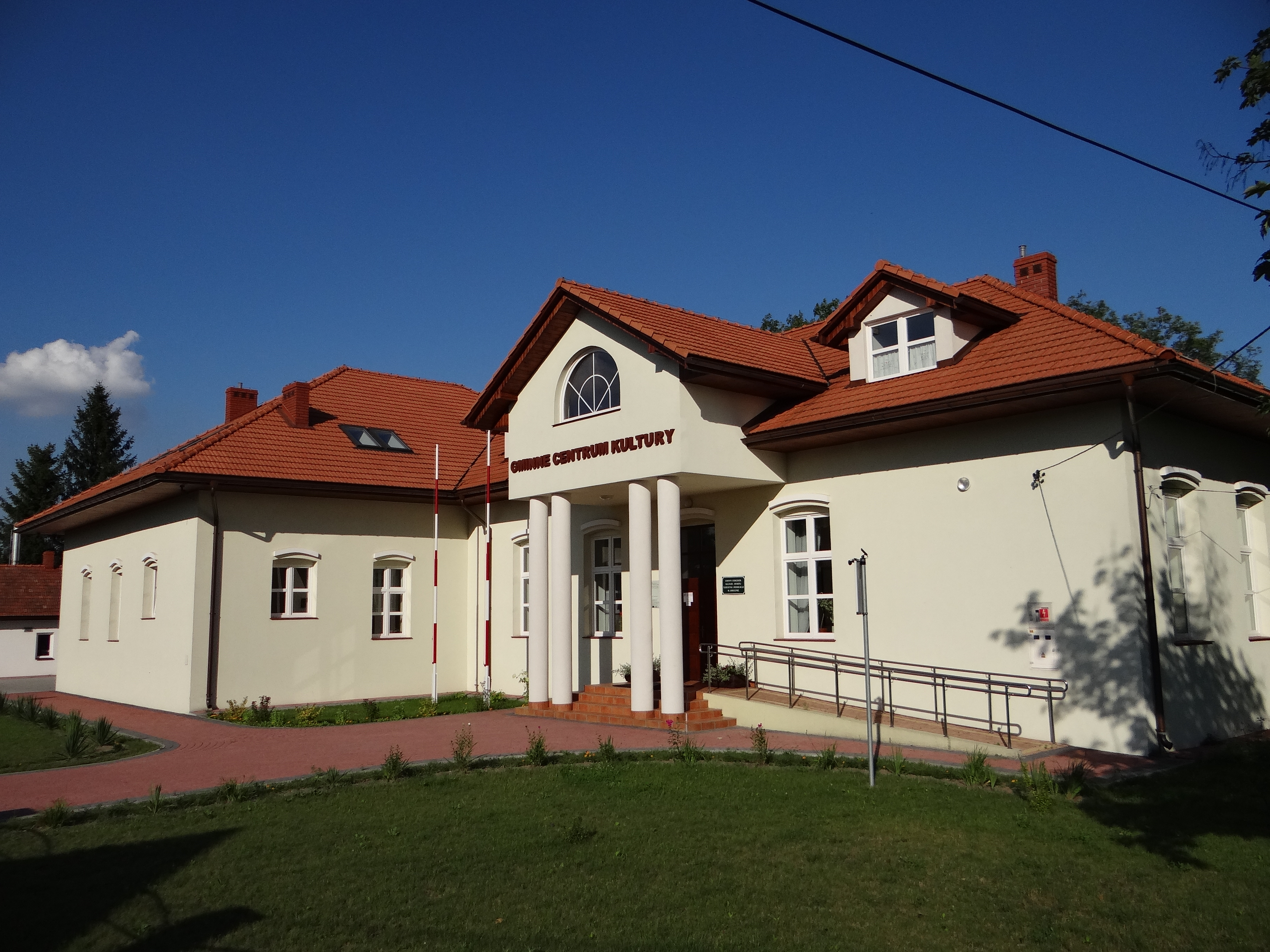
Gmina Cultural Centre

Gmina Jarocin is a rural gmina (administrative district) in Nisko County, Subcarpathian Voivodeship, in south-eastern Poland. Its seat is the village of Jarocin, which lies approximately 14 kilometres (9 mi) east of Nisko and 64 km (40 mi) north of the regional capital Rzeszów.

The gmina covers an area of 90.43 square kilometres (34.9 sq mi), and as of 2006 its total population is 5,313 (5,444 in 2013).

== Villages ==
Gmina Jarocin contains the villages and settlements of Domostawa, Golce, Jarocin, Katy, Kutyły, Majdan Golczański, Mostki, Szwedy, Szyperki and Ździary.

== Neighbouring gminas ==
Gmina Jarocin is bordered by the gminas of Harasiuki, Janów Lubelski, Pysznica and Ulanów.
