= Żuk Nowy =

- Village
- Location within Poland
- Coordinates: 50°29′21″N 22°24′12″E
- Country: Poland
- Voivodeship: Subcarpathian
- County: Nisko
- Gmina: Harasiuki
- Population: 60

Żuk Nowy [ˈʐuk'-nɔvɨ] is a village in the administrative district of Gmina Harasiuki, within Nisko County, Subcarpathian Voivodeship, in south-eastern Poland.
