= Yawhen Zhuk =

Belarusian-Israeli footballer

Yawhen Zhuk Яўген Жук
Personal information
- Date of birth: 2 February 1976 (age 50)
- Place of birth: Belarusian SSR
- Height: 1.81 m (5 ft 11 in)
- Position: Defender

Youth career
- 1994–1997: Dinamo-Juni Minsk

Senior career*
Years	Team	Apps	(Gls)
1994–1997	Dinamo-Juni Minsk	42	(1)
1997–1998	Torpedo Minsk	10	(0)
1997–1998	→ Real Minsk	12	(1)
1999–2000	Luninets	29	(0)
2001	Orlen Płock	6	(0)
2001–2002	Žalgiris Vilnius	34	(0)
2003	MTZ-RIPO Minsk	30	(1)
2004	Darida Minsk Raion	15	(0)
2004	Belshina Bobruisk	10	(0)
2004–2005	Bnei Sakhnin	1	(0)
2005	Lokomotiv Minsk	4	(0)
2005	Ironi Kiryat Shmona		
2005–2006	Maccabi Be'er Sheva	13	(0)
2007	Savit Mogilev	4	(0)
2008	Slutsksakhar Slutsk	4	(0)
- * Club domestic league appearances and goals

Yawhen Zhuk (Belarusian: Яўген Жук, Russian: Евгений Жук) is a Belarusian-Israeli retired professional association footballer. He started his career in Belarus, before moving to Israel in 2004 and acquiring Israeli citizenship with application of Law of Return.
