= Radyyon Zhuk =

Belarusian footballer

Personal information
- Date of birth: 6 March 1983 (age 43)
- Place of birth: Soligorsk, Minsk Oblast, Belarusian SSR
- Position: Goalkeeper

Team information
- Current team: Smorgon

Youth career
- 2000–2002: Shakhtyor Soligorsk

Senior career*
Years	Team	Apps	(Gls)
2000–2002	Shakhtyor Soligorsk	0	(0)
2000	→ Belaruskaliy Soligorsk	1	(0)
2001–2002	→ Starye Dorogi (loan)	44	(0)
2003–2004	Neman Grodno	1	(0)
2005–2009	Smorgon	64	(0)
2010–2011	Granit Mikashevichi	35	(0)
2012	Slutsk	2	(0)
2013–2015	Smorgon	57	(0)
- * Club domestic league appearances and goals

Radyyon Zhuk (Belarusian: Радыён Жук; Russian: Родион Жук; born 6 March 1983) is a Belarusian former professional footballer.
