= Jarocin, Podkarpackie Voivodeship =

Jarocin
- Village
- Location within Poland
- Coordinates: 50°33′52″N 22°19′10″E
- Country: Poland
- Voivodeship: Subcarpathian
- County: Nisko
- Gmina: Jarocin
- Population: 1,300

Jarocin [jaˈrɔt͡ɕin] is a village in Nisko County, Subcarpathian Voivodeship, in south-eastern Poland. It is the seat of the gmina (administrative district) called Gmina Jarocin.
