= Jeżowe =

- Village
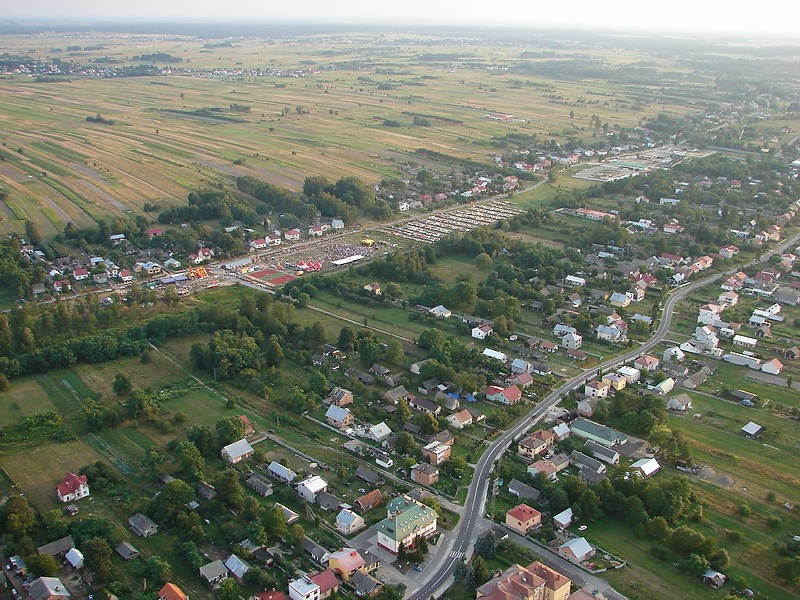
- Aerial view

- Flag Coat of arms

- Location within Poland
- Coordinates: 50°22′31″N 22°8′36″E
- Country: Poland
- Voivodeship: Subcarpathian
- County: Nisko
- Gmina: Jeżowe
- Population: 5,200
- Website: http://www.jezowe24.pl/

Jeżowe [jɛˈʐɔvɛ] is a village in Nisko County, Subcarpathian Voivodeship, in south-eastern Poland. It is the seat of the gmina (administrative district) called Gmina Jeżowe.

== Sparta Jeżowe ==
Klub Sportowy Sparta Jeżowe is a Polish football club, which competes in the A-class, the seventh-tier of professional football. The club was founded in 1955, and has a blue-red color. The local stadium has 3,500 seats.
