= Paweł Żuk =

Paweł Żuk may refer to:

- Paweł Żuk (footballer, born 1985), Polish footballer who plays as a midfielder
- Paweł Żuk (footballer, born 2001), Polish footballer who plays as a defender or midfielder
