= Nisko =

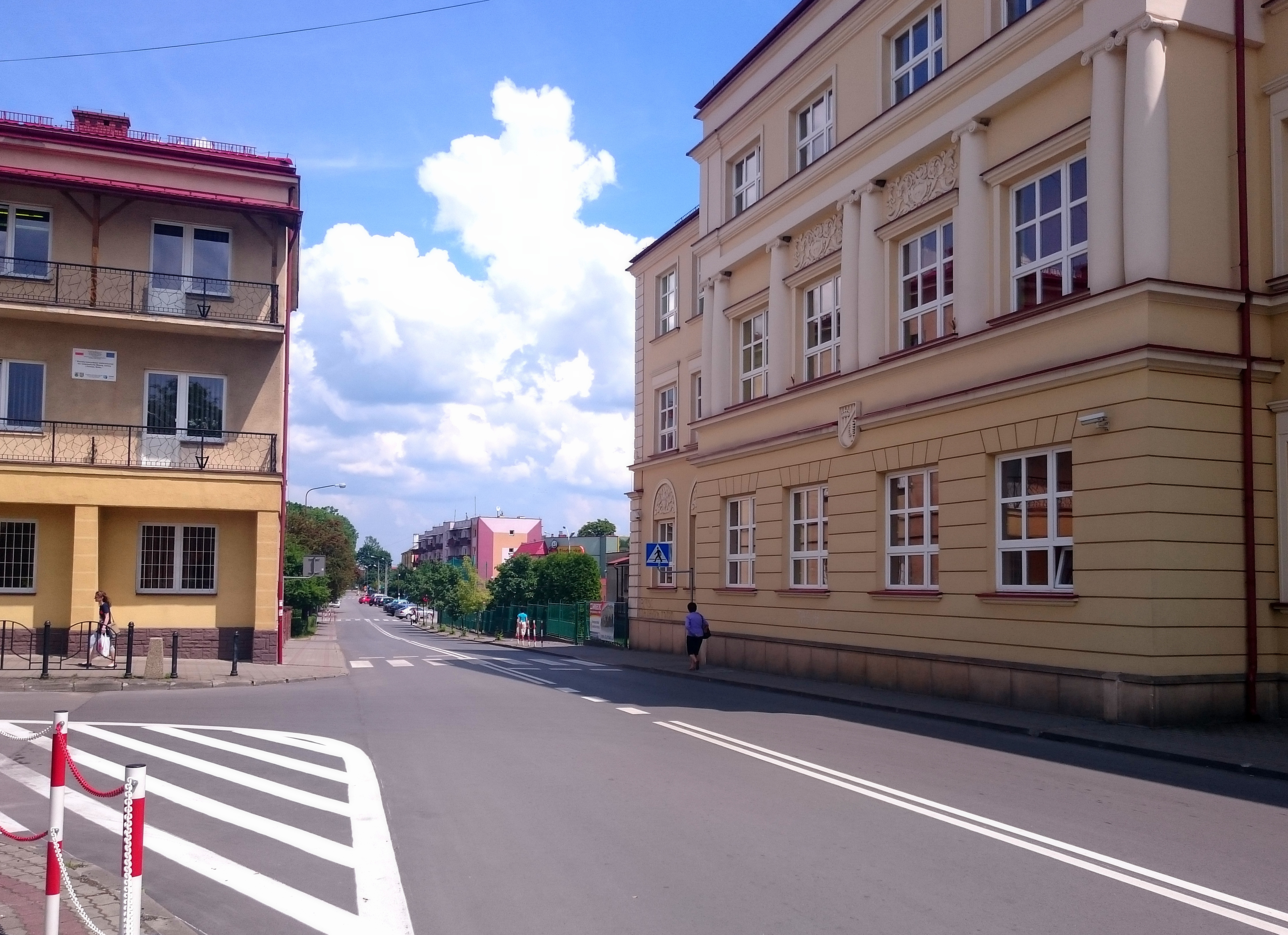
- Town center

- Flag Coat of arms

- Location within Poland
- Coordinates: 50°31′12″N 22°8′22″E
- Country: Poland
- Voivodeship: Subcarpathian
- County: Nisko
- Gmina: Nisko
- First mentioned: 1439
- Town rights: 1933

Government
  - Mayor: Konrad Krzyżak (PiS)

Area
  - Total: 61.02 km^{2} (23.56 sq mi)

Population (2021)
  - Total: 15,048
  - Density: 246.6/km^{2} (638.7/sq mi)
- Time zone: UTC+1 (CET)
  - Summer (DST): UTC+2 (CEST)
- Postal code: 37–400
- Car plates: RNI
- Website: www.nisko.pl

Nisko pronounced [ˈɲiskɔ] is a town in Nisko County, Subcarpathian Voivodeship, Poland on the San River, with a population of 15,048 inhabitants as of 31 December 2021. Together with neighbouring city of Stalowa Wola, Nisko creates a small agglomeration.

== History ==
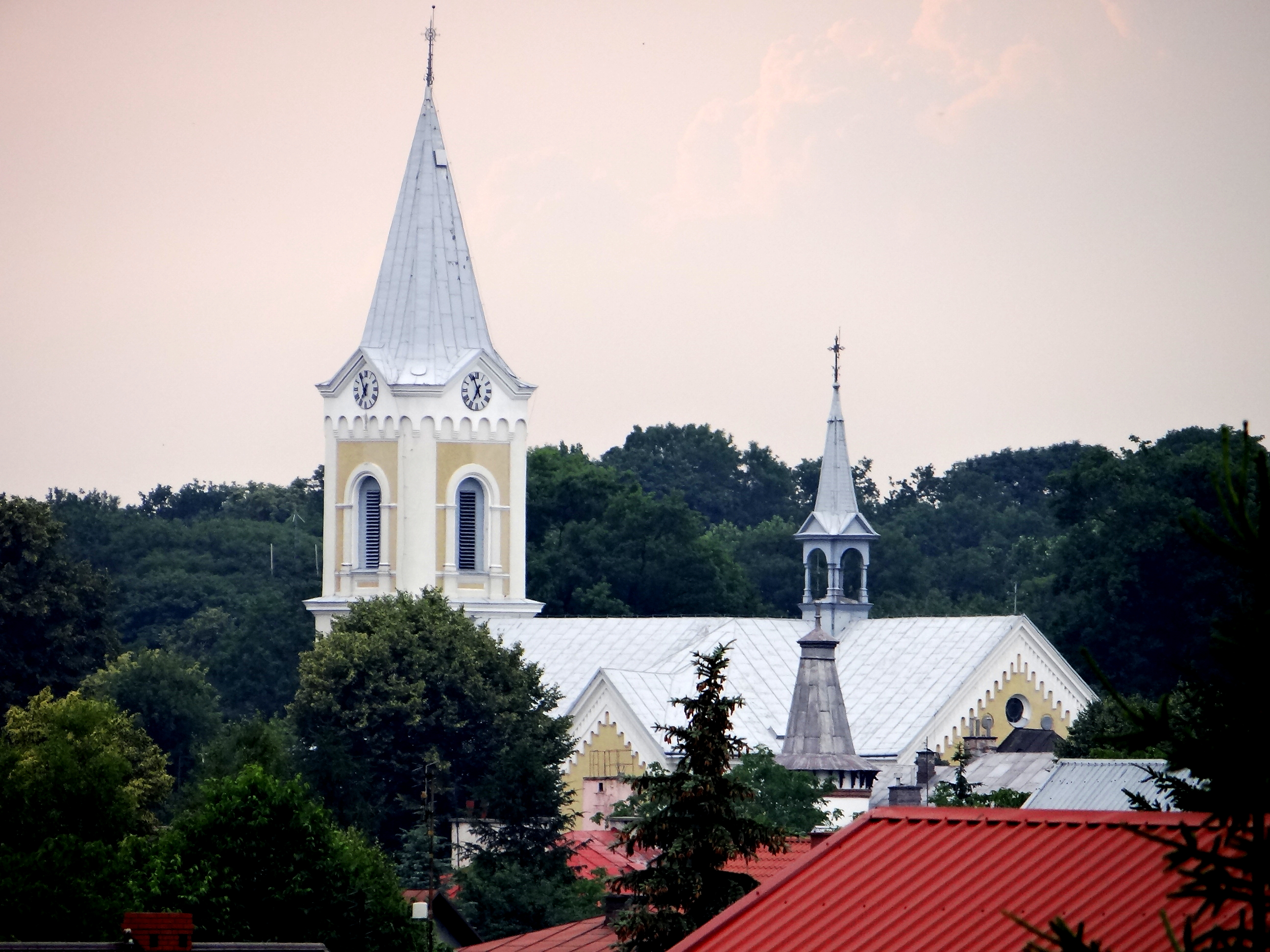
Saint Joseph church

Nisko was first mentioned in a document dated 15 April 1439, in which King Władysław III of Varna handed the villages of Nysky, Zaoszicze and Pyelaskowicze to a local nobleman. Furthermore, Nisko was also mentioned by Jan Długosz, in his work Liber beneficiorum dioecesis Cracoviensis. The establishment of the village was probably the result of catastrophic Mongol Invasion of Poland, which decimated the population of Lesser Poland. Residents of burned villages and towns resettled in the areas north of the enormous Sandomierz Forest. Probably in the second half of the 13th century, a village was established on a hill near the San river. Nisko was a royal village administratively located in the Sandomierz County in the Sandomierz Voivodeship in the Lesser Poland Province.

Due to the location on the edges of the forest, local residents supported themselves by hunting and trade of timber, which was transported to other centers along the San and the Vistula waterways. In the 1570s, peasants from Nisko and other locations rebelled against the Starosta of Sandomierz, Andrzej Firlej. In 1578, they met with King Stephen Báthory, who stayed in Tarnogród, asking him for justice. The king supported the peasants, urging Firlej to come to Warsaw. On 10 November 1583, Batory issued a bill, in which he backed demands of the peasants.

For centuries Nisko remained a small village, whose development was halted during the Swedish invasion of Poland. On 28 March 1656, Stefan Czarniecki fought here Swedish troops, which advanced towards Lwów.

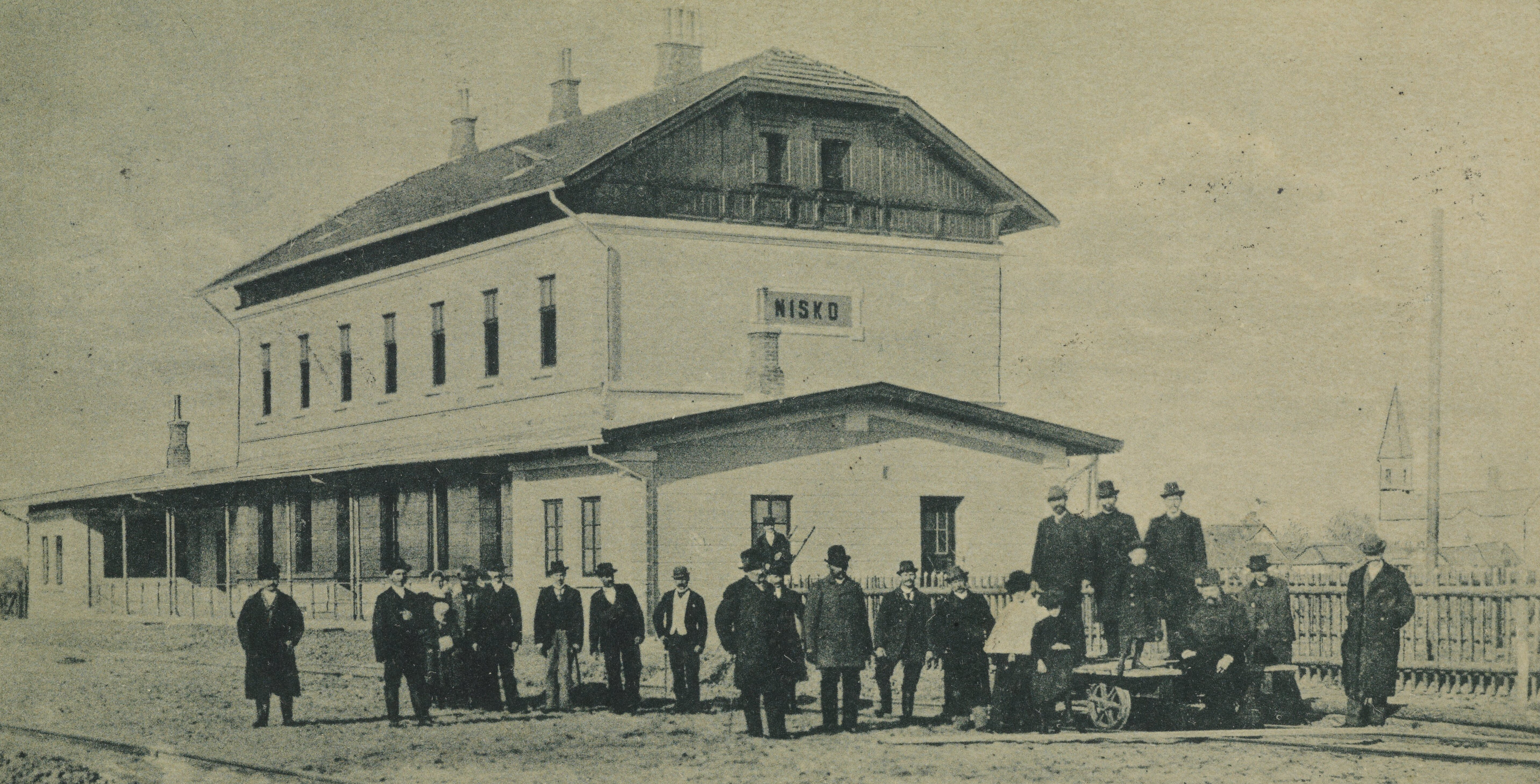
Nisko railway station, c. 1900

Following the First Partition of Poland, Nisko was annexed by the Habsburg Empire, and remained within Austrian Galicia until November 1918. In 1867 Count Eugene Kinsky bought the Nisko estate to give it to his daughter Countess Marie Kinsky of Wchinitz and Tettau as a wedding present, which took place in Vienna on 21 September 1868. From 1868 to 1912 under Count Oliver Rességuier de Miremont and his family, the village grew to become one of the largest estates in then Austrian Galicia. A railroad station, a hospital, a church (three in present-day Nisko), schools, factories, Austrian Army Base (currently Polish Army Base) and a palace (now used as a hospital building) were built. Most of these buildings are still in use. The village was also the capital of administration unit, Nisko County.

The Nisko railway station is in operation since 14 January 1900.

=== 20th century ===
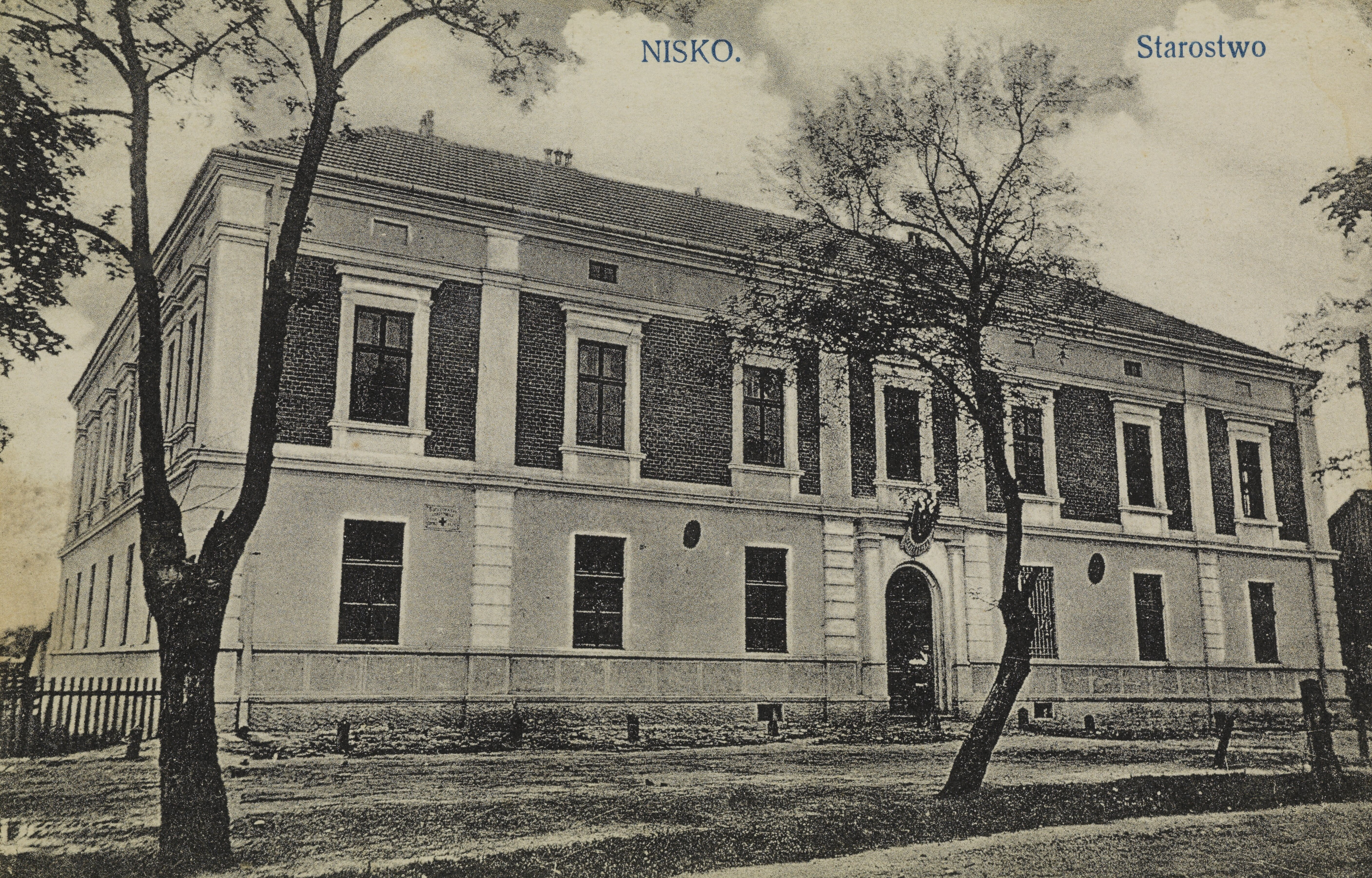
County council, ca 1905–1915

In 1914, when World War I began, many buildings in Nisko were destroyed by the Russian Army, which attacked Austria-Hungary. In 1918, local Poles gained control over the government in Nisko and the village became part of the new-formed Second Polish Republic. In newly restored Poland, Nisko was the seat of a county in Lwów Voivodeship, but remained a village until 20 October 1933. According to the 1921 census, it had a population of 4,749, 90.8% Polish and 8.7% Jewish. On 19 January 1937 in Warsaw, a bill was signed, which created Southern Works (Zaklady Poludniowe) – a large steel plant, part of the Central Industrial Region. On 20 March 1937, first pine trees were cut in a forest in the village of Pławo, a few kilometers north of Nisko. In two years, a brand new city of Stalowa Wola was established around the plant. It was a milestone in history of the town, because several projects were started in the area, such as a foundry and a power-plant in the forests on the western boundary of Nisko. The programme of industrialization was stopped with the invasion of Poland by Nazi Germany and Soviet Union in September 1939.

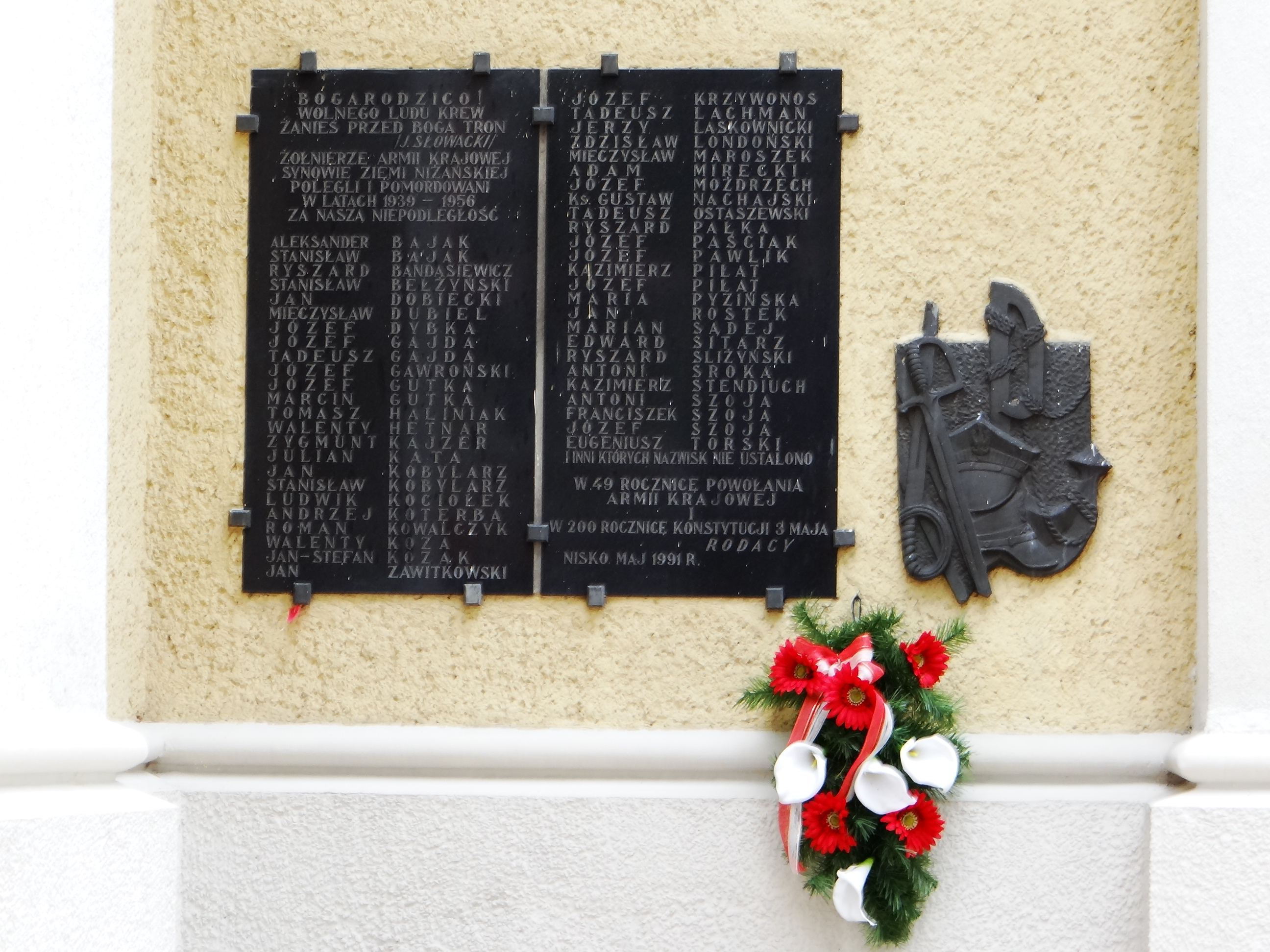
Memorial to local Home Army partisans killed and murdered in 1939–1956

Already in the early stages of World War II, shortly after the German invasion of the town, the German Einsatzgruppe I entered the town to commit various atrocities against the population. As part of the Intelligenzaktion, on November 10, 1939, the Germans deceitfully gathered Polish teachers from the town and its surroundings for a supposed formal meeting, then arrested them and imprisoned them in Rzeszów. During the war, Nisko became the focus of the Nazi German Nisko und Lublin Plan of forcible relocation of about 95,000 Jews from all over occupied Poland and from abroad in the name of German Lebensraum. Chief architect of the Holocaust, Adolf Eichmann, set up a transit camp in Nisko, from which the deportees were to be expelled eastward. The town was an important center of the Polish resistance movement, including the Home Army and Bataliony Chłopskie. Since early 1940, underground Polish press was distributed in the town. In March 1941, the Germans carried out mass arrests of resistance members involved in the distribution of Polish press in Nisko and other nearby towns. Arrested resistance members were then mostly imprisoned, interrogated and tortured in the local prison. The Polish resistance made an unsuccessful attempt to liberate the prisoners, after which the Germans deported the prisoners to the infamous Montelupich prison in Kraków, and then to the Auschwitz concentration camp. In 1944–1945, the Red Army and the Soviet NKVD arrested here a number of Poles, executing members of anti-communist resistance.

== Education ==
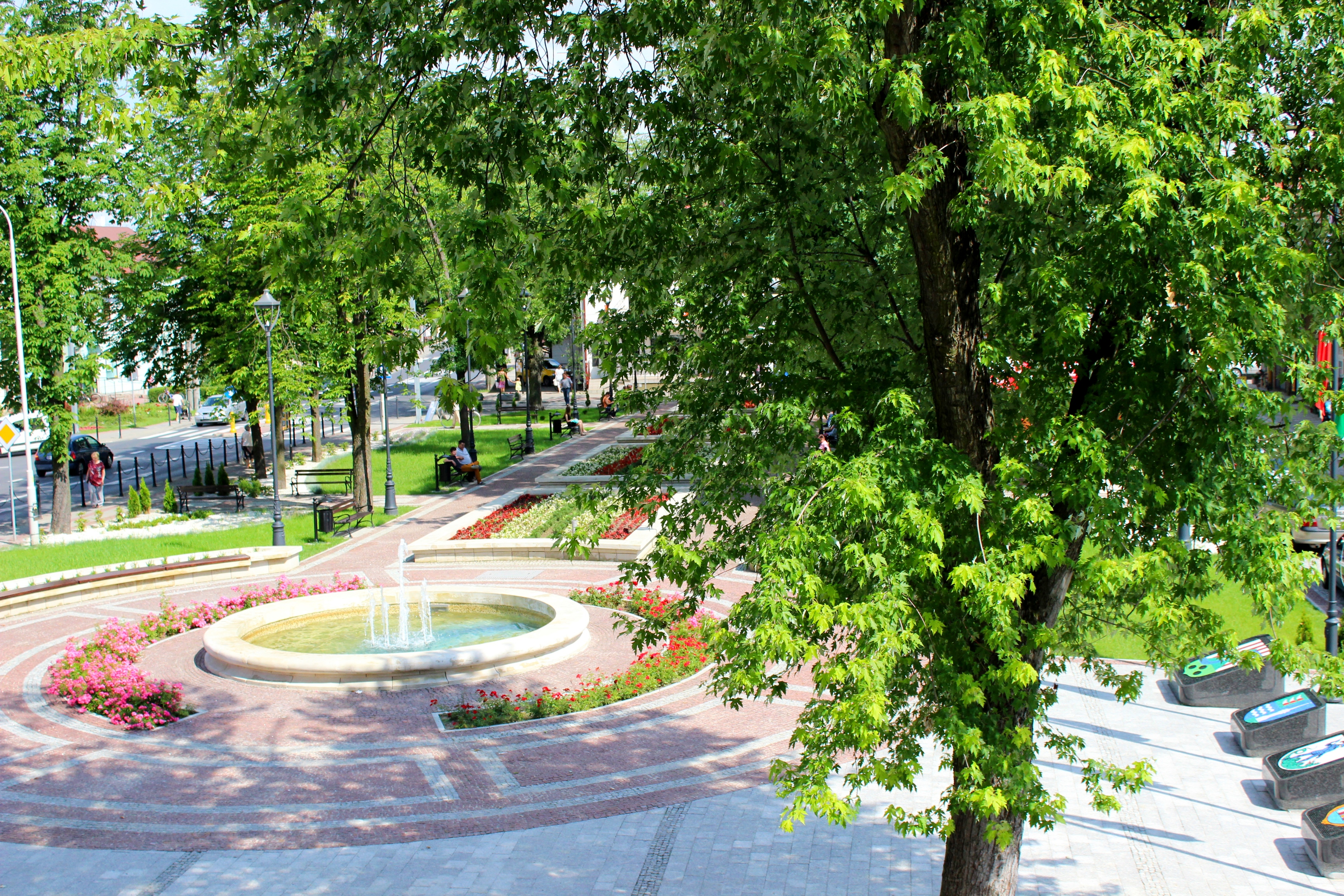
Plac Wolności ("Freedom Square") in the town center

- Wyższa Szkoła Informatyki i Zarządzania in Rzeszów, branch in Nisko

== Entertainment ==
The annual event, Dni Niska (Nisko Days), is held at the Municipal Stadium in Nisko.

== Sports ==
- Sokół Nisko – a football team, playing in IV liga
- Amatorski Klub Sportowy "Orkan"
- Klub Sportowy "Zarzecze"
- LZS Podwolina – a football team, playing in klasa B
- Stowarzyszenie Klub Sportowy "Galena" Racławice

== Notable people ==
- Friedrich von Ledebur (1900–1986), Austro-Hungarian officer and actor
- Jadwiga Damse (born 1947), Polish luger
- Jan Maria Gisges (1914–1983), Polish poet, prose writer and dramatist
- Witold Karaś (born 1951), former Poland national football team international

== Twin towns – sister cities ==
Nisko is twinned with:

- Fehérgyarmat, Hungary
- Hecklingen, Germany
- Horodok, Ukraine
- Semerovo, Slovakia

== See also ==
- Nisko Jewish Cemetery
- Nisko Plan, German Nazi's "territorial solution to the Jewish question"
- Nisko railway station
