= Nisko County =

Nisko County Powiat niżański
- County
- Flag Coat of arms

- Location within the voivodeship
- Coordinates (Nisko): 50°32′N 22°8′E
- Country: Poland
- Voivodeship: Subcarpathian
- Seat: Nisko
- Gminas: Total 7: Gmina Harasiuki; Gmina Jarocin; Gmina Jeżowe; Gmina Krzeszów; Gmina Nisko; Gmina Rudnik nad Sanem; Gmina Ulanów

Area
  - Total: 785.58 km^{2} (303.31 sq mi)

Population (2019)
  - Total: 66,699
  - Density: 84.904/km^{2} (219.90/sq mi)
  - Urban: 23,456
  - Rural: 43,243
- Car plates: RNI
- Website: www.powiat-nisko.pl

Nisko County (Polish: powiat niżański) is a unit of territorial administration and local government (powiat) in Subcarpathian Voivodeship, south-eastern Poland. It came into being on January 1, 1999, as a result of the Polish local government reforms passed in 1998. Its administrative seat and largest town is Nisko, which lies 57 kilometres (35 mi) north of the regional capital Rzeszów. The county also contains the towns of Rudnik nad Sanem, lying 13 km (8 mi) south-east of Nisko, and Ulanów, 11 km (7 mi) east of Nisko.

The county covers an area of 785.58 square kilometres (303.3 sq mi). As of 2019 its total population is 66,699, out of which the population of Nisko is 15,324, that of Rudnik nad Sanem is 6,710, that of Ulanów is 1,422, and the rural population is 43,243.

== Neighbouring counties ==
Nisko County is bordered by Janów County to the north-east, Biłgoraj County to the east, Leżajsk County to the south-east, Rzeszów County to the south, Kolbuszowa County to the south-west and Stalowa Wola County to the north-west.

== Administrative divisions ==
The county is subdivided into seven gminas (three urban-rural and four rural). These are listed in the following table, in descending order of population.

Gmina	Type	Area (km^{2})	Population (2019)	Seat
Gmina Nisko	urban-rural	142.4	22,381	Nisko
Gmina Jeżowe	rural	123.8	10,155	Jeżowe
Gmina Rudnik nad Sanem	urban-rural	78.7	10,121	Rudnik nad Sanem
Gmina Ulanów	urban-rural	119.6	8,278	Ulanów
Gmina Harasiuki	rural	168.3	6,103	Harasiuki
Gmina Jarocin	rural	90.4	5,390	Jarocin
Gmina Krzeszów	rural	62.4	4,271	Krzeszów
