= Wind quintet =

Group of five wind players

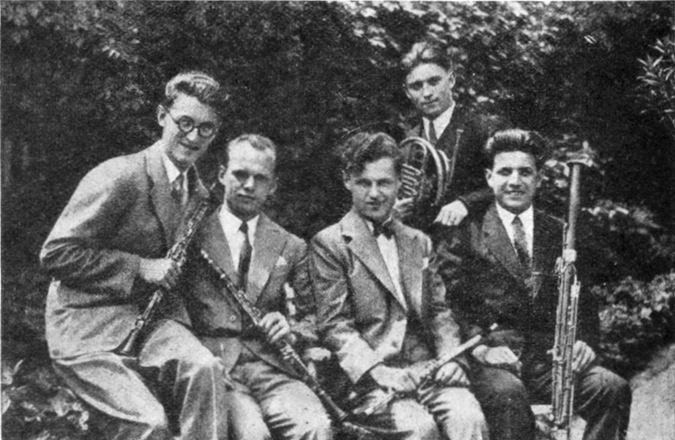
The Prague Wind Quintet, c. 1931

A wind quintet, also known as a woodwind quintet, is a group of five wind players (most commonly flute, oboe, clarinet, French horn and bassoon).

Unlike the string quartet (of 4 string instruments) with its homogeneous blend of sound color, the instruments in a wind quintet differ from each other considerably in technique, idiom, and timbre. The modern wind quintet sprang from the octet ensemble favored in the court of Joseph II in late 18th century Vienna: two oboes, two clarinets, two (natural) horns, and two bassoons. The influence of Haydn's chamber writing suggested similar possibilities for winds, and advances in the building of these instruments in that period made them more useful in small ensemble settings, leading composers to attempt smaller combinations.

It was Anton Reicha's twenty-four quintets, begun in 1811, and the nine quintets of Franz Danzi that established the genre, and their pieces are still standards of the repertoire. Though the form fell out of favor in the latter half of the 19th century, there has been renewed interest in the form by leading composers in the 20th century, and today the wind quintet is a standard chamber ensemble, valued for its versatility and variety of tone color.

== Notable wind quintet composers ==
Trois quintetti concertans (Three Wind Quintets), c.1802, by Giuseppe Cambini; performed by the Soni Ventorum Wind Quintet, 1970
No. 1 in B♭ major
I. Allegro maestoso

II. Larghetto cantabile

III. Rondo Allegretto grazioso

No. 2 in D minor
I. Allegro espressivo

II. Larghetto sostenuto ma con moto

III. Presto ma non tanto

No. 3 in F major
I. Allegro maestoso

II. Larghetto sostenuto

III. Rondo Allegro con brio

=== Eighteenth century ===
- Antonio Rosetti (ca. 1750–1792) One quintet, for flute, oboe, English horn, clarinet, and bassoon

=== Nineteenth century ===
- Johann Georg Albrechtsberger (1736–1809), a quintet for two oboes, clarinet, natural horn, and bassoon
- Giuseppe Cambini (1746–1825), three quintets
- Franz Danzi (1763–1826), nine quintets
- Johann Georg Lickl (1769–1843), one quintet
- Anton Reicha (1770–1836), twenty-four quintets, as well as some independent movements
- George Onslow (1784–1853), one quintet, op. 81
- Giulio Briccialdi (1818–1881), three quintets
- Paul Taffanel (1844–1908), one quintet
- August Klughardt (1847–1902), one quintet

=== Twentieth century ===
- Guy Ropartz (1864–1955), one quintet
- Carl Nielsen (1865–1931), one quintet
- Gustav Holst (1874–1934), one quintet
- Heinrich Kaspar Schmid (1874-1953), one quintet
- Arnold Schoenberg (1874–1951), one quintet
- Theodor Blumer (1881–1964), four quintets
- Percy Grainger (1882–1961), two quintets
- Wallingford Riegger (1885–1961), one quintet
- Heitor Villa-Lobos (1887–1959), one quintet
- Jacques Ibert (1890–1962), one quintet
- Hendrik Andriessen (1892–1981), one quintet
- Darius Milhaud (1892–1974), one quintet
- Walter Piston (1894–1976), one quintet
- Paul Hindemith (1895–1963), one quintet
- Roberto Gerhard (1896–1970), one quintet
- Carlos Chávez (1899–1978), one quintet
- Ernst Krenek (1900–1991), two quintets
- Ruth Crawford-Seeger (1901–1953), one quintet
- Claude Arrieu (1903–1990), one quintet
- Ferenc Farkas (1905–2000), one quintet
- Mátyás Seiber (1905–1960), one quintet
- Jaroslav Ježek (1906–1942), one quintet
- Alec Wilder (1907–1980), twelve quintets
- Otto Mortensen (1907–1986), one quintet
- György Ránki (1907–1992), one quintet
- Elliott Carter (1908–2012), two quintets
- Vagn Holmboe (1909–1996), one quintet
- Ljubica Maric (1909–2003), one quintet
- Samuel Barber (1910–1981), one quintet
- Josef Tal (1910–2008), one quintet
- Jean Françaix (1912–1997), two quintets
- Ingolf Dahl (1912–1970), one quintet
- Alvin Etler (1913–1973), two quintets, a concerto for quintet and orchestra, and a concerto for violin and wind quintet
- Vivian Fine (1913–2000), one quintet
- Irving Fine (1914–1962), two quintets
- George Perle (1915–2009), four quintets
- Vincent Persichetti (1915–1987), two quintets
- Dinu Lipatti (1917–1950), one quintet and six transcriptions of Scarlatti sonatas for wind quintet
- Peter Racine Fricker (1920–1990), one quintet
- Witold Silewicz (1921–2007), at least one quintet, esp. Happy Birthday to You.
- Malcolm Arnold (1921–2006), two quintets
- Harry Freedman (1922–2005), three quintets, one with narrator
- György Ligeti (1923–2006), two quintets
- Milko Kelemen (born 1924), one quintet
- Jurriaan Andriessen (1925–1996), one quintet
- Luciano Berio (1925–2003), four quintets
- Włodzimierz Kotoński (1925–2014), one quintet
- Barney Childs (1926–2000), one quintet
- Hans Werner Henze (1926–2012), one quintet
- Lee Hoiby (1926–2011), one quintet
- Gottfried Michael Koenig (born 1926), one quintet
- Franco Donatoni (1927–2000), one quintet
- Wayne Peterson (1927–2021), one quintet and five transcriptions of other composers' works
- Jean-Michel Damase (1928–2013), one quintet
- Frigyes Hidas (1928–2007), three quintets
- Karlheinz Stockhausen (1928–2007), three quintets
- Donald Martino (1931–2005), one quintet
- Per Nørgård (1932–2025), one quintet
- Ramiro Cortés (1933–1984), one quintet
- István Láng (1933–2023), three quintets
- Harrison Birtwistle (1934–2022), two quintets
- Rob du Bois (1934–2013), two quintets
- Peter Schat (1935–2003), one quintet
- David Del Tredici (born 1937), one quintet
- Charles Wuorinen (born 1938), one quintet
- Frank Zappa (1940–1993), two quintets
- Friedrich Goldmann (1941–2009), one quintet, and a sonata for wind quintet with piano
- Michael Kibbe (born 1945) 15 quintets, 3 quintet and Piano, 1 quintet and cello
- Martin Bresnick (born 1946), one quintet
- Richard St. Clair (born 1946), one quintet
- Jack Gallagher (born 1947), one quintet
- Stephen Brown (born 1948), one quintet
- Robert Beaser (born 1954), one quintet
- Eric Ewazen (born 1954), two quintets plus one concerto for quintet with orchestra or piano
- David A. Jaffe (born 1955), one quintet
- Luca Francesconi (born 1956), two quintets
- Kenneth Fuchs (born 1956), two quintets
- Oleksandr Shchetynsky (born 1960), one quintet
- William Susman (born 1960), one quintet
- Karlheinz Essl (born 1960), one quintet
- Ludmila Yurina (born 1962), one quintet
- Juan María Solare (born 1966), four quintets
- Peter Fribbins (born 1969), one quintet
- Lior Navok (born 1971), one quintet, and a double quintet that would belong in the 21st-century list

=== Twenty-first century ===
- Yoav Talmi (born 1943), one quintet
- Robin Holloway (born 1943), "Nursery Rhymes" (Divertimento No.3) op. 33a (1977) for soprano and wind quintet, and "Five Temperaments" for wind quintet op.105
- John Zorn (born 1953) one quintet
- Nigel Keay (born 1955), one quintet
- Shigeru Kan-no (born 1959), no quintets, but there is one work combining wind and brass quintets with brass orchestra
- Peter Seabourne (born 1960), "Child's Play..." for wind quintet
- Osvaldo Coluccino (born 1963), one quintet
- Ananda Sukarlan (born 1968) piece for piano & wind quintet
- Shai Cohen (born 1968), "STYX V+1" For wind quintet and vibraphone
- James Francis Brown (born 1969), one quintet
- Valerie Coleman (born 1970)
- Robert Paterson (born 1970), one quintet
- Emily Doolittle (born 1972), one quintet, and one work for narrator and quintet
- Yalil Guerra, (born 1973, Cuba), one quintet titled "Las Musas de San Alejandro"
- Cris Derksen (born 1981), one quintet
- Sean Friar (born 1985), one quintet
- Mohammed Fairouz (born 1985), one quintet
- Michael Gilbertson (born 1987) concerto for quintet with orchestral
- Gabriel Vicéns (born 1988), one quintet
- Alex Weiser (born 1989), one quintet

== Notable wind quintet repertoire ==
- Andriessen, Jurriaan, Sciarada Spagnuola [Spanish Charade] (1963)
- Arnold, Malcolm, Three Shanties, op. 4 (1943)
- Bach, Jan, Skizzen, Highgate Press [Sketches, Highgate Press] (1983)
- Barber, Samuel, Summer Music, op. 31 (1955)
- Baur, Jürg, Quintetto sereno [Serene Quintet] (1957–58)
- Beaser, Robert, Shadow and Light (1981)
- Bennett, Richard R., Concerto for Woodwind Quintet
- Berio, Luciano
  - Ricorrenze (1987)
  - Wind Quintet (1948)
  - Wind Quintet (1950)
  - Opus Number Zoo (arr. 1951 for wind quintet, from the 1950 original for 2 clarinets and 2 horns)
- Birtwistle, Harrison
  - Refrains and Choruses (1957)
  - Five Distances (1992)
- Bloch, Waldemar, Serenade (1966)
- Blumer, Theodor, Serenade, Theme and Variations
- Bobescu, Constantin, Parafrază pe motivul "Horei Staccato" (1958)
- Bois, Rob du
  - Chants et contrepoints (1962)
  - Réflexions sur le jour où Pérotin le Grand ressuscitera (1969)
- Bottje, Will Gay, Diversions, for quintet, narrator and piano; text by James Thurber (1994)
- Bozza, Eugene
  - Variations sur un thème libre, op. 42 (1943)
  - Scherzo, op. 48 (1944)
  - Pentaphonie (1969)
  - Quand les muses collaborent
- Bresnick, Martin
  - Just Time (1985)
  - Willie's Way (2006, quintet arrangement by Richard Mathias 2011)
- Brown, Stephen, Suite for Woodwinds, (1982, revised 2006)
- Buss, Howard J., Five Stars (2004)
- Cambini, Giuseppe Maria, Trois quintetti concertans [Three Concertante Quintets] (ca. 1802)
  - Quintet no. 1 in B♭ major
  - Quintet no. 2 in D minor
  - Quintet no. 3 in F major
- Carter, Elliott
  - Nine by Five (2009)
  - Quintet (1948)
- Chávez, Carlos, Soli no. 2 (1961)
- Osvaldo Coluccino, Diffratta aria (2002)
- Cortés, Ramiro, Three Movements for Five Winds (1967–68)
- Dahl, Ingolf, Allegro and Arioso
- Damase, 17 Variations op. 22, (1951)
- Danzi, Franz, 9 Quintets:
  - op. 56, no. 1 in B♭ major
  - op. 56, no. 2 in G minor
  - op. 56, no. 3 in F major
  - op. 67, no. 1 in G major
  - op. 67, no. 2 in E minor
  - op. 67, no. 3 in E♭ major
  - op. 68, no. 1 in A minor
  - op. 68, no. 2 in F major
  - op. 68, no. 3 in D minor
- Del Tredici, David, Belgian Bliss (2011)
- Franco Donatoni Blow (1989)
- Dubois, Pierre Max, Fantasia (1956)
- Etler, Alvin
  - Concerto for Violin and Wind Quintet (1958)
  - Concerto for Wind Quintet and Orchestra (1960)
  - Quintet no. 1 (1955)
  - Quintet no. 2 (1957)
- Farkas, Ferenc
  - Régi magyar táncok a XVII. századból (aka Antiche danze ungheresi del 17. secolo) [Old Hungarian Dances from the 17th century] (1959)
  - Lavottiana (1968)
- Fine, Irving
  - Partita (1948)
  - Romanza (1958)
- Fine, Vivian, Dancing Winds (1987)
- Françaix, Jean
  - Quintette à vent [Wind Quintet] no. 1 (1948)
  - Quintette à vent [Wind Quintet] no. 2 (1987)
- Friar, Sean
  - Short Winds, for wind quintet (2010)
- Gallagher, Jack, Ancient Evenings and Distant Music (1971)
- Genzmer, Harald
  - Bläserquintett [Wind Quintet] no. 1 (1957)
  - Bläserquintett [Wind Quintet] no. 2 (1970)
- Goeb, Roger
  - Prairie Songs (1947)
  - Wind Quintet No. 1 (1949)
  - Wind Quintet No. 2 (1955)
  - Wind Quintet No. 3 (1980)
  - Wind Quintet No. 4 (1982)
- Goldmann, Friedrich
  - Bläserquintett [Wind Quintet] (1991)
  - Sing' Lessing, for baritone, wind quintet, and piano (1978)
  - Sonata for Wind Quintet and Piano (1969)
  - Zusammenstellung, for wind quintet (1976)
- Hall, Pauline
  - Suite for Wind Quintet (1948)
  - Quintet, Lyche (1952)
- Harbison, John, Wind Quintet (1979)
- Heiden, Bernhard
  - Intrada in B♭ major op. 56, for Quintet and alto saxophone (1970)
  - Sinfonia (1949)
  - Woodwind Quintet (1965)
- Hidas, Frigyes
  - Fúvósötös [Wind Quintet] no. 2 (1969)
  - Fúvósötös [Wind Quintet] no. 3 (1979)
- Hindemith, Paul, Kleine Kammermusik [Little Chamber Music], op. 24, no. 2 (1923)
- Hoiby, Lee, Diversions for Wind Quintet (1999)
- Holst, Gustav, Wind Quintet in A♭, op. 14 (1903)
- Ibert, Jacques, Trois Pièces Brèves [Three Short Pieces]
- Jacob, Gordon
  - Suite for Wind Quintet, unpublished
  - Sextet for piano and wind quintet (1956)
- Kelemen, Milko
  - Études contrapuntiques [Contrapuntal Etudes] (1959)
  - Entrances for wind quintet (1966)
- Klughardt, August, Quintet op. 79
- Koenig, Gottfried Michael, Bläserquintett [Wind Quintet], for flute, oboe, English horn, clarinet, and bassoon (1958–59)
- Kotoński, Włodzimierz, Kwintet na instrumenty dęte [Wind Quintet] (1964)
- Kurtág, György, Fúvósötös [Wind Quintet], op. 2 (1959)
- Láng, István
  - Fúvósötös [Wind Quintet] no. 1 (1964)
  - Fúvósötös [Wind Quintet] no. 2 (1965)
  - Fúvósötös [Wind Quintet] no. 3 (1975)
- Ligeti, György
  - Sechs Bagatellen [6 Bagatelles] (1953, arr. from Musica ricercata)
  - 10 Stücke [10 Pieces], for alto flute (doubling flute and piccolo), English horn (doubling oboe d'amore, oboe), clarinet, horn, and bassoon (1968)
- Maslanka, David
  - Quintet for Winds No. 1
  - Quintet for Winds No. 2
  - Quintet for Winds No. 3
  - Quintet for Winds No. 4
- Marić, Ljubica, Duvački kvintet [Wind Quintet] (1931)
- Mathias, William, Wind Quintet, op. 22 (1963)
- Milhaud, Darius, La Cheminée du roi René [King René's Fireplace]
- Mortensen, Otto, Quintette pour Flûte, Hautbois, Clarinette, Cor et Basson (1944)
- Navok, Lior
  - Six Short Stories for Woodwind Quintet
  - The Adventures of Pinocchio (for three actors / speakers, wind quintet and piano)
  - Tetris – for double wind quintet
- Nielsen, Carl, Wind Quintet (1922)
- Nørgård, Per, Whirl's World (1970)
- Onslow, George, Wind Quintet, op. 81 (1850)
- Oteri, Frank J., circles mostly in wood, a wind quintet in quartertones (2002)
- Paterson, Robert, Wind Quintet (2004)
- Patterson, Paul
  - Comedy for Five Winds (1972)
  - Westerly Winds (1998)
- Perle, George
  - For Piano and Wind, for flute, English horn, clarinet, horn, bassoon, and piano (1988)
  - Wind Quintet no. 1 (1959)
  - Wind Quintet no. 2 (1960)
  - Wind Quintet no. 3 (1967)
  - Wind Quintet no. 4 (1984), winner of the 1986 Pulitzer Prize for Music
- Persichetti, Vincent
  - Pastoral, op.21 (1943)
  - King Lear, op.35, for wind quintet, timpani, and piano (1948)
- Peterson, Wayne, Metamorphosis (1967)
- Piazzolla, Astor, Milonga sin palabras [Milonga without words]
- Pierné, Paul, Suite pittoresque [Picturesque Suite]
- Pilss, Carl, Serenade in G Major
- Piston, Walter, Wind Quintet (1956)
- Poulenc, Sextet, for wind quintet and piano (1932–39)
- Ránki, György, Pentaerophonia
- Reicha, Anton
  - Twenty-four Wind Quintets, Opp. 88, 91, 99, and 100 (1810–20)
- Riegger, Wallingford, Concerto, op. 53, for wind quintet and piano (1956)
- Rosowsky, Solomon
  - "Moshe der Shuster" (Moshe the Cobbler) (1917)
  - "Nigun ohne a Sof" (Melody without an End) (1917)
- Schat, Peter, Improvisations and Symphonies, op. 11 (1960)
- Schoenberg, Arnold, Bläserquintett [Wind Quintet], op. 26 (1923–24)
- Schulze, Werner, Explosioni
- Seiber, Mátyás, Permutazioni a Cinque for wind quintet (1958)
- Solare, Juan María
  - Extraños preludios y doble canon (Strange preludes and double canon) (1992)
  - Nómade (adaptation of the piece originally for piano solo) (2002–2006)
  - Ölflecke auf dem Wasser (Oil spots on the water) (2003)
  - Born equal (2011)
- Stockhausen, Karlheinz
  - Zeitmaße [Time-measures], for flute, oboe, English horn, clarinet, and bassoon (1955–56)
  - Adieu, für Wolfgang Sebastian Meyer (1966)
  - Rotary Wind Quintet (1997)
- Sukarlan, Ananda, "Mozart Meandering through Java before Bumping into Beethoven in Boston" for piano & wind quintet, written for the winds of Boston Symphony Orchestra. He also wrote 5 individual pieces for each wind instrument with piano, based on Ovid's "Metamorphosis", written for those members of BSO
- Susman, William, Six Minutes Thirty Seconds (1995)
- Taffanel, Paul, Quintet for Wind Instruments
- Tal, Josef, Wind Quintet (1966)
- Thuille, Ludwig, Sextet for Wind Instruments and Piano
- Tomasi, Henri, Cinq Danses [Five Dances]
- Villa-Lobos, Heitor, Quinteto (em forma de chôros) [Quintet in the Form of a Chôros], for flute, oboe, English horn, clarinet, and bassoon (1928; arr. for the conventional quintet 1951)
- Weiser, Alex, Wind (2013)
- Wuorinen, Charles, Wind Quintet (1977)
- Yurina, Ludmila, Geometricum (1993)

== Notable wind quintets ==
- Artecombo
- Cracow Golden Quintet
- Danzi Quintet
- Dorian Wind Quintet
- Farkas Quintet Amsterdam
- Imani Winds
- LutosAir Quintet
- New London Chamber Ensemble
- New York Woodwind Quintet
- Philharmonisches Bläserquintett Berlin
- Quintet of the Americas
- Soni Ventorum Wind Quintet
- Vancouver Woodwind Quintet
- Vento Chiaro
