= Richard Hill's Commonplace Book =

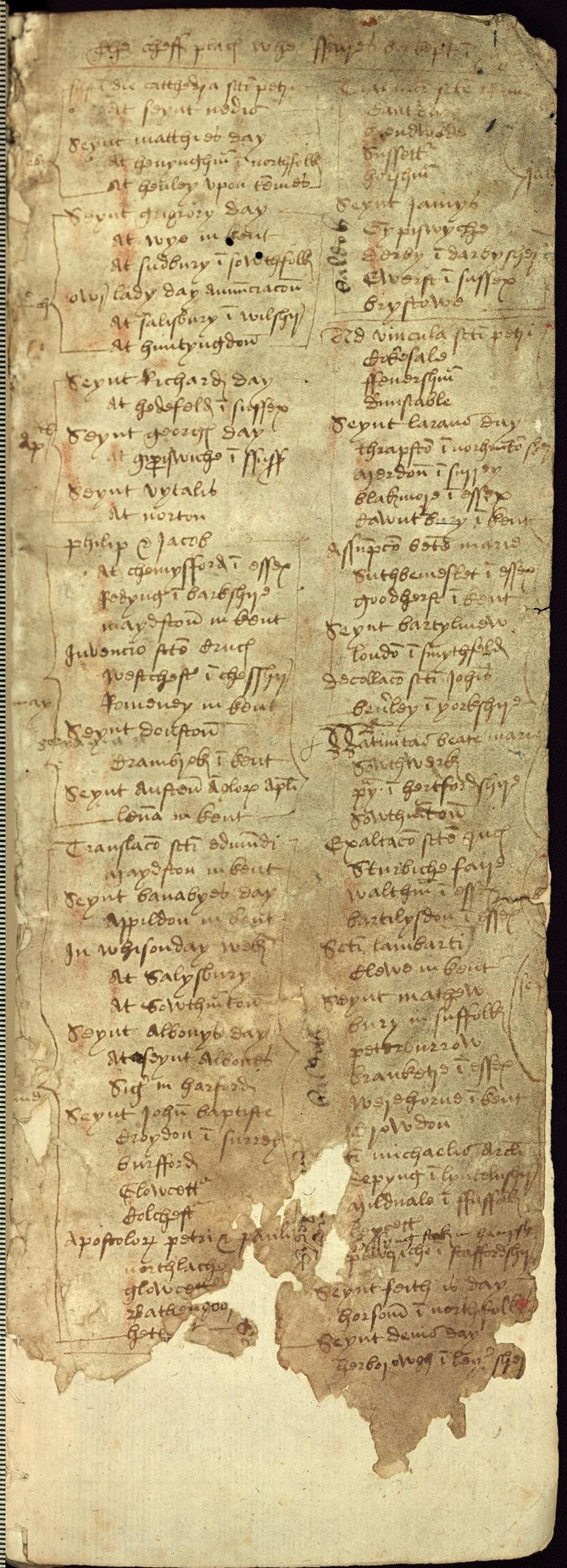
Page 1 of Richard Hill's Commonplace Book

Richard Hill's Commonplace Book, or Oxford, Balliol College MS 354, is a manuscript collection of late-medieval English poems and other miscellaneous items compiled between 1503 and 1536 by the London merchant Richard Hill. It is an important source of 15th-century and early 16th-century lyrics, preserving such well-known works as "The Boar's Head Carol", "The Corpus Christi Carol" and "The Nut-Brown Maid". It also presents some interesting sidelights on commercial life in early Tudor England.

== Physical description ==
Richard Hill's Commonplace Book is a paper manuscript of 514 numbered pages measuring 31.3 centimetres (12.3 in) vertically and 11.3 centimetres (4.4 in) horizontally, a format typical of a tradesman's account book, and it has an old wrapper of limp vellum. It is quired irregularly in 10s and 12s, some quires having missing leaves and some additional ones. It is described as being "well written in small current hands", much the most common hand being that of Hill himself. The first and last few leaves have suffered damage from damp.

== History ==
Richard Hill, originally a Hitchin man, became first a servant of a certain London alderman called Wynger, then eventually a London merchant trading with the Low Countries. Internal evidence shows that he compiled his commonplace book between the years 1503 and 1536. Ownership inscriptions in different parts of the manuscript indicate that after Hill's death it became the property first of his eldest son, John Hill, and later in the 16th century of one John Stokes. A series of jottings dated 1731 shows it to be in the possession of some person of agricultural interests. It is not known when the commonplace book passed to the library of Balliol College, Oxford, but in 1855 it was recorded that it had recently been found there, "where it had been accidentally concealed, behind a book-case, during a great number of years". The historian J. A. Froude drew attention to it in an essay published in Fraser's Magazine in 1858. An edition was planned by the Camden Society at this time, but never reached publication; the standard editions, by Ewald Flügel and Roman Dyboski, did not appear until 1903 and 1908 respectively. In 1993 Balliol College commissioned Peter Maxwell Davies to compose a choral setting of parts of the Commonplace Book to commemorate the centenary of the death of Benjamin Jowett. Corpus Christi, with Cat and Mouse was first performed by the Balliol College Chapel Choir under the direction of Mark Dawes in November 1993.

== Contents ==
Richard Hill's Commonplace Book describes itself as "A Boke of dyueris tales and balettes and dyueris Reconynges etc". Its contents are extraordinarily varied, including treatises on polite behaviour and arithmetic, notes on events in Hill's family, collected proverbs, literature, riddles, chronicles, a French conversation manual, and instructions on breaking horses, conjuring with cards, and making rat poison. Its texts of late medieval carols and other lyrics are especially notable. It is a source for such poems as "The Corpus Christi Carol", "The Boar's Head Carol", "Gentill butler, bell ami", "Make we mery bothe more and lasse", "Alas, my hart will brek in three", "Holy bereth beris", "Draw me nere", "What cher? Gud cher, gud cher, gud cher", and "O marcyfull God, maker of all mankynd". It also includes John Lydgate's "The Virtues of the Mass" and "The Churl and the Bird", Thomas More's "Fortune Verses", the anonymous "Nut-Brown Maid" and The Seven Sages of Rome, "The Treatise of London" (sometimes attributed to William Dunbar), and extracts from John Gower's Confessio Amantis.

== Editions ==
- Flügel, Ewald (1903). "Liedersammlungen des XVI. Jahrhunderts, besonders aus der Zeit Heinrichs VIII. III". Anglia (in German). 26: 94–285.
- Dyboski, Roman, ed. (1908). Songs, Carols, and Other Miscellaneous Poems, from the Balliol MS. 354, Richard Hill's Commonplace-Book. Early English Text Society. Extra Series, 101. London: Kegan Paul, Trench, Trübner.
