= Corpus Christi Carol =

Middle or Early Modern English hymn

The Corpus Christi Carol, or Falcon Carol, is a Middle or Early Modern English hymn (or carol), first written down by an apprentice grocer named Richard Hill between 1504 and 1536. The original writer of the carol remains anonymous. The earliest surviving record of the piece preserves only the lyrics and is untitled. It has survived in altered form in the folk tradition as the Christmas carol "Down In Yon Forest". The structure of the carol is six stanzas, each with rhyming couplets. The tense changes in the fourth stanza from past to present continuous.

While a number of different interpretations have been offered over time, Eamon Duffy writes that "there can be no question whatever" that the carol's "strange cluster of images" are derived "directly from the cult of the Easter sepulchre, with its Crucifix, Host, and embroidered hangings, and the watchers kneeling around it day and night."

One theory about the meaning of the carol is that it is concerned with the legend of the Holy Grail. In Arthurian traditions of the Grail story, the Fisher King is the knight who is the Grail's protector, and whose legs are perpetually wounded. When he is wounded his kingdom suffers and becomes a wasteland. This would explain the reference to "an orchard brown".

The text may be an allegory in which the crucified is described as a wounded knight. The bleeding knight could be Christ who bleeds for the sins of humanity endlessly. Christ is most probably represented as a knight as he is battling sin and evil by his continual pain. The "orchard brown" to which the knight was conveyed becomes, in this reading, the "orchard" of wooden crosses that covered the hill of Golgotha/Calvary where Christ - along with many others - was crucified, while the "hall... hanged with purpill and pall" could be a representation of the tomb in which Christ was placed after Crucifixion. This allegorical interpretation would tie in with the seven stanzas possibly representing the Seven Deadly Sins. The maiden who is by the knight's side could be Mary. There is religious symbolism throughout the carol. The falcon may have several possible meanings. It may be that, as a bird of prey, it represents those who killed Christ and sent him to heaven. It may also represent a new beginning and freedom, which Christ gained on his death. The colours in the carol are also significant. The purple and gold are signs of wealth, although these were also colours that referred to the Church due to its wealth. The pall (black velvet) probably refers to death.

Richard Greene theorized in 1960 that the song refers "to the displacement of Queen Catherine of Aragon by Anne Boleyn in the affections of King Henry VIII", because the falcon was Anne's heraldic badge.

== Britten setting ==
Benjamin Britten used the text in the fifth variation of A Boy was Born (Choral Variations For Mixed Voices), Opus 3, in 1933. The text was combined with Christina Rossetti's "In the Bleak Midwinter". The solo version of the Christi Carol was arranged for and dedicated to John Hahessy (John Elwes). He recorded the song in 1961 with Benjamin Britten himself at the piano. The song was included in a record with a group of other Britten songs taken from a set of children's songs entitled "Friday Afternoons", also the title of the disc, which were composed for his brother who was a school teacher.

Recordings of the Britten setting (or adaptations of it) include:

- Janet Baker recorded Britten's arrangement for high voice on her 1967 album "A Pageant of English Song: 1597-1961" with pianist Gerald Moore.
- Singer-songwriter Jeff Buckley, inspired by Baker's version, included his interpretation on his debut 1994 album, Grace. About his version Buckley said, "The 'Carol' is a fairytale about a falcon who takes the beloved of the singer to an orchard. The singer goes looking for her and arrives at a chamber where his beloved lies next to a bleeding knight and a tomb with Christ's body in it."
- Jeff Beck performs his (in turn) Buckley-inspired interpretation on his 2010 album, Emotion & Commotion. In the album liner notes, the English guitarist states: "When I heard Jeff Buckley's album, the simplicity and the beauty of the way he sounded amazed me."
- Ian Read's English neo-folk band Fire + Ice, on their 1992 album Gilded by the Sun.
- New London Children's Choir's 2008 album, Pigs Could Fly.
- The Chapel choir of Corpus Christi College, Cambridge on their 2009 album, Ave Virgo.
- New Zealand soprano Hayley Westenra on her 2009 album Winter Magic.
- Libera's 2011 album, The Christmas Album.
- "Of Kings and Angels" by Mediaeval Baebes.
- The Choirboys' 2005 album, The Choirboys.
- Voces8's 2014 album, Eventide.

== Other settings ==
- As World War I came to an end in 1919, Peter Warlock set the text for soprano and tenor accompanied by a wordless chorus; he rescored it for voices and string quartet in 1927.
- John Gerrish wrote a setting for it in 1957, titled "The Falcon".
- Ramiro Cortés wrote a setting for soprano and piano in 1956, titled "The Falcon", published by Edition Peters No. 6062.
- Harrison Birtwistle combined it with "O my deir hert, young Jesus sweit" by James, John and Robert Wedderburn in his "Monody for Corpus Christi", for soprano, flute, violin and horn, in 1959.
- It was set for unaccompanied choir by Norwegian composer Trond Kverno in 1995.
- Judith Bingham set the words for choir and organ in 2012 for Queen Elizabeth II’s diamond jubilee.
- In 2015 the Chapel choir of Corpus Christi College, Oxford recorded a choral version, with a setting written by the then senior organ scholar Peter Ladd.
- Scottish singer-songwriter Archie Fisher recorded poet Robert Graves' adaptation (as "passed to him by Robin Hill"), combining elements of this text and "Down in yon forest" and entitled "Looly, Looly", on his album Will Ye Gang, Love (1976).
- Nicholas Maw set the words for choir and piano in the Cambridge Hymnal (1967) following a commission by Elizabeth Poston.

In 2007 it was sung in Season 1, Episode 2 of the drama on Showtime, The Tudors.

== Lyrics ==
Original Middle English lyrics

He bare hym vp, he bare hym down,
He bare hym in to an orchard brown.
Lully, lulley, lully, lulley!
Þe fawcon hath born my mak away.

In þat orchard þer was an hall,
Þat was hangid with purpill & pall;
Lully, lulley, lully, lulley!
Þe fawcon hath born my mak away.

And in þat hall þer was a bede,
Hit was hangid with gold so rede;
Lully, lulley, lully, lulley!
Þe fawcon hath born my mak away.

And yn þat bed þer lythe a knyght,
His wowndis bledyng day & nyght;
Lully, lulley, lully, lulley!
Þe fawcon hath born my mak away.

By þat bedis side þer kneleth a may,
& she wepeth both nyght & day;
Lully, lulley, lully, lulley!
Þe fawcon hath born my mak away.

& by þat beddis side þer stondith a ston,
“Corpus Christi” wretyn þer-on.
Lully, lulley, lully, lulley!
Þe fawcon hath born my mak away.

Modern English gloss

He bore him up, he bore him down,
He bore him into an orchard brown.
Lully, lullay, lully, lullay!
The falcon has borne my mate away.

In that orchard there was a hall
That was hanged with purple and pall;
Lully, lullay, lully, lullay!
The falcon has borne my mate away.

And in that hall there was a bed:
It was hanged with gold so red;
Lully, lullay, lully, lullay!
The falcon has borne my mate away.

And in that bed there lies a knight,
His wounds bleeding day and night;
Lully, lullay, lully, lullay!
The falcon has borne my mate away.

By that bed's side there kneels a maid,
And she weeps both night and day;
Lully, lullay, lully, lullay!
The falcon has borne my mate away.

And by that bed’s side there stands a stone,
"The Body of Christ" written thereon.
Lully, lullay, lully, lullay!
The falcon has borne my mate away.
