= Choir Boys =

Choir Boys can refer to:

- the plural of Choir boy, i.e. singers in a boys - or mixed choir (especially church - and/or school choirs)
- Boy soprano
- Choir Boys (SpongeBob SquarePants), an episode of SpongeBob SquarePants
- The Choirboys (boyband)
- The Choirboys, an Australian Hard rock band.
