= Alvin Etler =

American composer and musician

Alvin Derald Etler (February 19, 1913 – June 13, 1973) was an American composer and oboist.

== Career ==
A student of Paul Hindemith, Etler is noted for his highly rhythmic, harmonically and texturally complex compositional style, taking inspiration from the works of Bartók and Copland as well as the dissonant and accented styles of jazz.

Though he played with the Indianapolis Symphony in 1938, he abandoned his orchestral life shortly thereafter to focus on his increasingly successful compositional career (which earned him two Guggenheim Fellowships during this period). In 1942 he joined the faculty at Yale University as conductor of the university band and instructor of wind instruments, where he began his studies with Hindemith. He also taught at Cornell University and University of Illinois before accepting a position at Smith College, which he held until his death.

Notable works include his two woodwind quintets (from 1955 and 1957), a bassoon sonata, the 1963 "Quintet for Brass Instruments", and "Fragments" for woodwind quartet.

Etler is also the author of Making Music: An Introduction to Theory, an introductory-level theory text published posthumously in 1974.

== Works list ==
=== Orchestral ===
- Passacaglia and Fugue, 1947
- Concerto for string quartet and string orchestra, 1948
- Symphony, 1951
- Dramatic Overture, 1956
- Concerto in 1 movement, 1957
- Elegy, 1959
- Concerto for wind quintet and orchestra, 1960
- Triptych, 1961
- Concerto for brass quintet, string orchestra, and percussion, 1967
- Convivialities, 1967
- Concerto for string quartet and orchestra, 1968

=== Chamber music ===
- Sonata for oboe, clarinet and viola, 1945
- Quartet for oboe, clarinet, viola and bassoon, 1949
- Prelude and Toccata, for organ, 1950
- Bassoon Sonata, 1951
- Clarinet Sonata no.1, 1952
- Introduction and Allegro, for oboe and piano, 1952
- Duo, for oboe and viola, 1954
- Sonatina, for piano 1955
- Wind Quintet, 1955
- Wind Quintet No. 2, 1957
- Concerto for violin and wind quintet, 1958
- Sonata for viola and harpsichord, 1959
- Sextet for oboe, clarinet, bassoon, violin, viola and cello, 1959
- Suite, for flute, oboe and clarinet, 1960
- Concerto, for clarinet and chamber ensemble, 1962
- String Quartet No. 1, 1963
- Brass Quintet, 1963
- String Quartet No. 2, 1965
- Sonic Sequence, for brass quintet, 1967
- Clarinet Sonata No. 2, 1969
- XL plus 1, for solo percussion, 1970
- Concerto for cello and seven instruments, 1970

=== Choral ===
- Peace be unto You (St Augustine, Bible: Matthew), SATB, 1958
- Under the Cottonwood Tree (Etler), SA, 1960
- Under Stars (Etler), SSAA, 1960
- Ode to Pothos (Etler), SSAATTBB, 1960
- Onomatopoesis (Etler), Male singer, 2 clarinets, bass clarinet, bassoon, 2 trumpets, horn, trombone, and percussion, 1965
