= Racławice, Podkarpackie Voivodeship =

Racławice
- Village
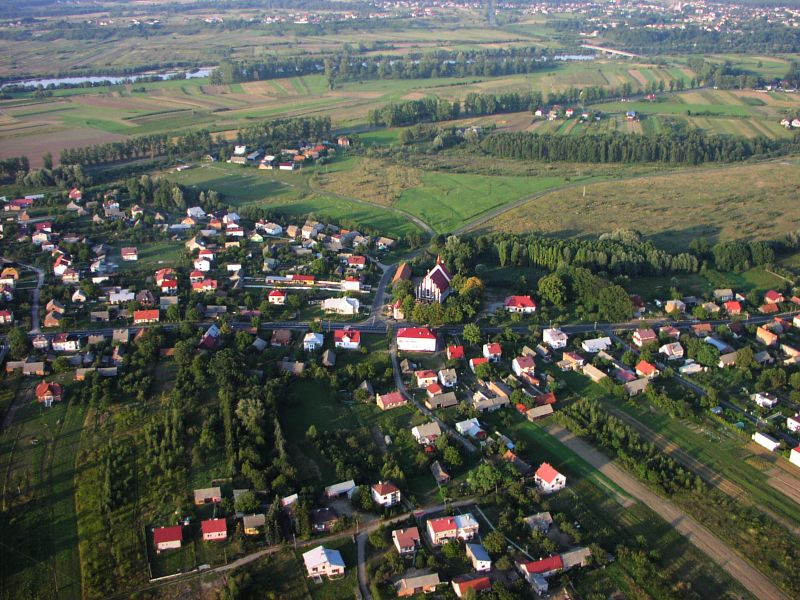
- Aerial view

- Location within Poland
- Coordinates: 50°31′N 22°10′E
- Country: Poland
- Voivodeship: Subcarpathian
- County: Nisko
- Gmina: Nisko
- Website: http://mareksamojeden.pl/historia-raclawic.html

Racławice [rat͡swaˈvʲit͡sɛ] is a village in the administrative district of Gmina Nisko, within Nisko County, Subcarpathian Voivodeship, in south-eastern Poland.

== Notable people ==
- Antoni Dyboski (1853-1917), a Polish lawyer and activist
