= Witold Silewicz =

Polish-Austrian composer

- Born: 18 May 1921; Rajsko, Oświęcim County, Poland
- Died: 26 January 2007 (aged 85); Vienna, Austria
- Occupations: Composer, arranger, Double bass player, conductor
- Spouse: Tatjana Silewicz

Witold Silewicz (18 May 1921 in Rajsko, Poland – 26 January 2007 in Vienna) was a Polish-Austrian composer and Double bass player, probably best known for his instrumental arrangement of the Happy Birthday to You tune for Woodwind Quintet.

== Biography ==
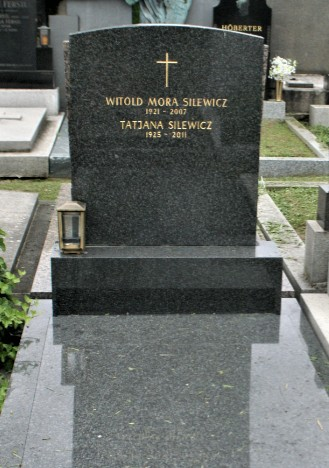
Grave of Witold Silewicz and his wife, Tatjana in Vienna's Döbling Cemetery

He was born in Rajsko nr. Oświęcim, on the estate of his maternal grandparents, the youngest of three children of Warsaw architect, Zdzisław Silewicz and his wife Stefania née Zwilling.

While still a child he was infected with Tuberculosis which affected his bones. As a result, he spent much time in treatment in sanatoria as was prescribed at the time, missing out on school. The illness left him lame in one leg for the rest of his life. When he was eight years old he lost his father who had died on a trip to Nice in 1930. In spite of his early trials, a striking musical talent became discernible. Through family connections on his mother's side, and at great risk after the outbreak of World War II, he was able to move to Vienna, then annexed to the Third Reich. In 1943 he was accepted by the Vienna Music Academy where he studied composition with Joseph Marx, conducting with Joseph Krips and Hans Swarowsky, a pupil of Richard Strauss. He earned his degree in 1951 after the earliest outing of his Adagio for Strings at the Vienna Musikverein already in 1949.

His double bass teachers from 1949 to 1955 were Johann Kramp and Otto Ruhm.

After completing his studies in Austria he travelled abroad where he developed his composition skills in France, Italy and Yugoslavia where he met his future Slovenian wife, Tatjana (1925-2011). After their marriage they settled in Vienna where they brought up two daughters. In 1962 Silewicz was taken on as a double bass player with the distinguished Tonkünstler Orchestra. He continued composing when his health allowed, greatly supported by his wife. He was an active member of the Polish Society of Musical Artists - abroad, i.e. musicians in exile, (Stowarzyszenie Polskich Artystów Muzyków - na obczyźnie, SPAM).

Witold Silewicz died in Vienna in January 2007.

== Works ==
- Two symphonies
- Concerts for solo instruments
- Chamber music
- Poème de la vie
- Ballet: Fanny Elssler – Frau u Mythos (1989)
- Kinderszenen
- Instrumental ensemble
- Geburtstagswünsche (Happy Birthday To You) for 2 clarinets, flute, oboe and bassoon
- Six Petites scènes d'enfants (1991)

== Distinctions ==
- City of Vienna Awards
- Awards by the Province of Niederösterreich (1981)

== Bibliography ==
- Hartmut Krones. Ed.Die Ősterreichische Symphonien im 20 Jahrhundert. Vienna: Böhlau Verlag, 2005. p. 12. ISBN 978-3205772071
