= Dancing Winds (Fine) =

Vivian Fine's Dancing Winds is a composition for wind quintet that was completed in 1987 to a commission by the Catskill Conservatory for the Catskill Wind Quintet. The quintet was first performed by the Catskill Wind Quintet on August 28, 1987.

At a later performance that took place in 1990 at the Windfall Dutch Barn in Salt Springville, New York, the reviewer, B.A. Nilsson, praised the works "...simple brew of rhythmically playful melodic elements..." and noted that choreographer Paul Sanasardo intended to create a dance piece around the music.

== Structure ==
The work is structured in four movements and takes around 11 minutes to perform:

1. Andante molto
2. Allegro
3. Andante molto
4. Energico
