= The Choirboys (group) =

English boy band

- Genres: Choral, classic
- Years active: 2005–2007
- Label: Universal
- Members: William Dutton; Bill Goss; Andrew Swait
- Past members: Patrick Aspbury; Ben Inman; CJ Porter-Thaw
- Website: thechoirboys.co.uk

The Choirboys was an English boy band, made up of cathedral choristers. In 2005, a talent search was held to find a young chorister to bring choral music into the current music scene. However, the judges could not decide which of the three finalists should be given the recording contract and decided to assemble them as a trio.

== Original members (2005) ==
The original line-up of the group was made of Patrick James Aspbury (born 9 June 1993, died 12 April 2017) Chelmsford), Eskricke Francis Benedict "Ben" Inman (born 19 March 1993, Starbeck, Harrogate, North Yorkshire) and Charles John "CJ" Porter-Thaw (born 11 December 1994, Sheffield). Both Aspbury and Porter-Thaw were members of Ely Cathedral choir and Inman was a member of the choir of Southwell Minster.

In the summer of 2005, they were selected from cathedral choristers around the UK for a recording contract with Universal Classics and Jazz, and released their self-titled first album in November of that year.

After an intensive promotional tour of television and radio stations, they performed at several events, including the Southwell Minster St. Cecilia Concert, the Ely Cathedral May Day Concert and charity concerts in London venues such as the Royal Albert Hall.

The first trio has since moved on and retired from singing as trebles at their respective cathedrals.

Inman recorded as a solo artist on the James Newton Howard soundtrack for the 2005 film, King Kong, and has since retired as a treble chorister from Southwell Minster. He won the Trebby Award for 'Best Solo Treble Track' in 2006 for "Fairest Isle".

== Death of Aspbury ==
On 12 April 2017 at age 23, Patrick Aspbury was hit and killed by a train at Chelmsford station in the UK while a patient at the mental health clinic Linden Centre in Essex. The facility is under scrutiny for having a large number of patients commit suicide while under the clinic's care. A year earlier, Aspbury had been missing for 48 hours while under treatment and a large search of the area was conducted by police. He eventually returned home on his own. An inquest into Aspbury's death determined from video footage at the railway station, that Aspbury intentionally jumped into the path of a moving train that was travelling at 60 miles per hour (100 km/h). The singer was being treated at the Essex Centre for schizophrenia, but was released on a day pass into the care of his father on the day of his death.

== New members (2007) ==
As the Choirboys matured, so did their voices, and to keep the sound of the group the same a new trio replaced Porter-Thaw, Aspbury and Inman. The new group was made up of Andrew Swait of Cheltenham College Gloucestershire, Bill Goss and Will Dutton who is the son of Paul Dutton. Swait was a member of Tewkesbury Abbey choir, Dutton was a member of St. Mark's Church in Harrogate and Goss was a pupil at St. Peter's School, York.

Swait features with other singers in many other albums. He features on Landscape and Time by the King's Singers, he sang with countertenor James Bowman in 2008 on Songs of Innocence with pianist Andrew Plant. He has sung with Anna Netrebko on her Souvenirs in 2008 and recorded on the NMC Recordings label on a celebratory disc of New Music released in 2009; here he premiered works by James MacMillan (with fellow treble Sam Harris, and harpist Lucy Wakeford) and Peter Maxwell Davies, again with Andrew Plant. Herald Records released his final treble solo album in 2009, Salve Puerule where he was accompanied by the Trinity College of Music Chamber Choir. Swait also appeared in the children's documentary A Different Life, which depicted his life as a chorister.

Dutton was awarded the BBC Radio 2 'Young Chorister of the Year' Award in 2006, and was also once a member of the National Children's Orchestra of Great Britain, where he was co-principal violinist.

Goss had taken part in the Music For Youth Festival in Birmingham Symphony Hall and twice taken first prize as well as an 'outstanding' award. He sang the role of Miles in Benjamin Britten's The Turn of the Screw with Opera Royal de Wallonie in Liège, Belgium, as well as numerous productions with Opera North including Verdi's Macbeth and Benjamin Britten's A Midsummer Night's Dream. In 2007 Goss was awarded two music scholarships to attend St. Peter's School, York. After finishing school he was awarded a Choral Scholarship to attend University College, Durham.

== Discography ==
=== Albums ===
==== The Choirboys ====
Their self-titled debut album was released 28 November 2005 and sold 100,000 copies in the first week, making it the fastest-selling classical debut album in the UK and earning The Choirboys a gold disc which was presented to them on the popular BBC children's television programme, Blue Peter. It has since gone 2× platinum and has to date sold over 750,000 copies. It peaked at No. 25 in the UK Albums Chart.

No.	Title	Writer(s)	Length
1.	"Ecce Homo" (Theme from Mr. Bean)	Howard Goodall	2:00
2.	"Tears in Heaven"	Eric Clapton, Will Jennings	4:06
3.	"Panis angelicus"	César Franck	3:47
4.	"Do You Hear What I Hear?" (featuring Hayley Westenra)	Noël Regney, Gloria Shayne Baker	2:53
5.	"Walking in the Air" (Theme from The Snowman)	Howard Blake	3:24
6.	"In paradisum"	Gabriel Fauré	3:06
7.	"The Lord bless you and keep you"	John Rutter	2:40
8.	"Pie Jesu"	Thomas of Celano	3:34
9.	"Danny Boy"	Frederic Weatherly	4:12
10.	"The Lord is My Shepherd" (Theme from The Vicar of Dibley)	Howard Goodall	3:01
11.	"He's Not Heavy, He's My Brother"	Bobby Scott, Bob Russell	3:44
12.	"Corpus Christi Carol" (From A Boy was Born)	Benjamin Britten	2:35
13.	"O for the Wings of a Dove"	Felix Mendelssohn	5:10
14.	"Agnus Dei"	Traditional	1:26
15.	"Let There Be Peace on Earth"	Jill Jackson Miller, Sy Miller	1:55
16.	"Miserere"	Gregorio Allegri	11:51

==== The Carols Album ====
A second album The Carols Album was released on 3 December 2007 in the UK. By this time the singing voices of the original Choirboys had changed and the members had changed to reflect this. The new line-up is Andrew Swait, William Dutton and Bill Goss.

No.	Title	Writer(s)	Length
1.	"O Holy Night" (Featuring All Angels)	Adolphe Adam	4:29
2.	"O Little Town of Bethlehem"	Phillips Brooks, Ralph Vaughan Williams	3:30
3.	"Ding Dong Merrily on High"	Jehan Tabourot, George Ratcliffe Woodward, Charles Wood	2:08
4.	"What Sweeter Music"	John Rutter	3:06
5.	"Have Yourself a Merry Little Christmas"	Hugh Martin, Ralph Blane	3:27
6.	"Silent Night"	Joseph Mohr, Franz Xaver Gruber, John Freeman Young	2:19
7.	"In the Bleak Midwinter"	Christina Rossetti, Gustav Holst	4:29
8.	"Coventry Carol"	Traditional	3:36
9.	"Away in a Manger"	Martin Luther	2:01
10.	"Once in Royal David's City"	Cecil Frances Alexander, Henry John Gauntlett	3:07
11.	"In Dulci Jubilo"	Heinrich Seuse, Robert Lucas de Pearsall, John Mason Neale	1:48
12.	"O Come, All Ye Faithful"	John Francis Wade, Frederick Oakeley	2:46
13.	"The Holly and the Ivy"	Traditional	3:31
14.	"Hark! The Herald Angels Sing"	Felix Mendelssohn, John Wesley, George Whitefield	3:04

=== Single ===
- "Tears in Heaven" released in 2005, with the B-side track, "Ave Maria", which was sung by Ben Inman. It reached No. 22 in the UK Singles Chart in 2005.
