= Antoni Dyboski =

Polish lawyer and activist

Antoni Dyboski, born as Antoni Dybka (5 June 1853 – 23 February 1917) was a Polish lawyer and activist.

== Early life and lawyer's career ==
He was born in Racławice near Nisko as a son of peasant. He finished the gimnazjum in Rzeszów and graduated in law at the University of Lwów. In 1881, Dybka settled in Cieszyn. He was working in the notary office of Andrzej Cinciała, a prominent Polish activist in Cieszyn Silesia. In 1890, Dybka legally changed his name to Dyboski.

After the death of Andrzej Kotula (d. 1891), another notary in Cieszyn, Dyboski became a notary substitute. In 1892, he became a notary. He ran his office in Cieszyn on the Stary Targ no. 141 (from 1892 to 1906) and on the Garncarska 3 (from 1906 to his death).

== Activism ==
In 1884, Dyboski was among a few Catholics, who organized the Polityczne Towarzystwo Ludowe (People's Political Society), a Polish society in Cieszyn Silesia, which was dominated by Lutherans. From 1883 to 1887, he was a member of the board of the Czytelnia Ludowa (People's Library) in Cieszyn.

From 1885 or 1886, he was a member of the Macierz Szkolna Księstwa Cieszyńskiego. In 1895 he became an informal lawyer of this society. From 1902 to 1904, he was a member of the board of the Macierz.

From 1883 to 1887, he was a secretary of the Towarzystwo Domu Narodowego in Cieszyn. From 1897 to 1898, he was chairman of this society.

From 1888 to 1891, he was a member of the board of the Towarzystwo Oszczędności i Zaliczek in Cieszyn.

== Later life ==
Antoni Dyboski died on February 23, 1917, in Cieszyn.

== Family ==
In 1883, he married Maria Łopuszańska (1858-1925). Maria was the granddaughter of Alfons de Pont-Wullyamoz. Maria's sister was the grandmother of Jerzy Ficowski.

Maria and Antoni had four children: sons Roman (1883-1945), Stanisław (1885-1929) and Tadeusz (1891-1939), and a daughter Jadwiga (baptized as Eleonora Jadwiga, b. 1886).
