= Vento Chiaro =

Wind quintet founded in 1997

- Origin: Baltimore, Maryland, United States
- Years active: 1997 –
- Members: Ona Jonaityte (flute); Elizabeth England (oboe); Chi-Ju Juliet Lai (clarinet); Sam Childers (bassoon); Anne Howarth (horn)

Vento Chiaro is a wind quintet founded in 1997 at the Peabody Conservatory of Music in Baltimore, Maryland and now based in the greater Boston area.

== History ==
The quintet was founded in 1997 by flautist Johanna Goldstein at the Peabody Conservatory of Music in Baltimore, Maryland. It relocated to the Boston area in 1999 when it became the ensemble-in-residence the Longy School of Music in Cambridge, Massachusetts. Since 2002 it has served on the faculty of the Boston University Tanglewood Institute's Young Artists Wind Ensemble. In 2008, the ensemble released their debut recording, Vento Chiaro: Music for Wind Quintet on Ongaku Records.

== Members ==
The current members of Vento Chiaro are:

- Ona Jonaityte (flute)
- Elizabeth England (oboe)
- Chi-Ju Juliet Lai (clarinet)
- Sam Childers (bassoon)
- Anne Howarth (horn)

== Awards ==
- Saunderson Award at the Coleman Chamber Music Competition.
- Silver Medal at the Fischoff National Chamber Music Competition in 2000.
