= Rajsko, Oświęcim County =

Rajsko
- Village
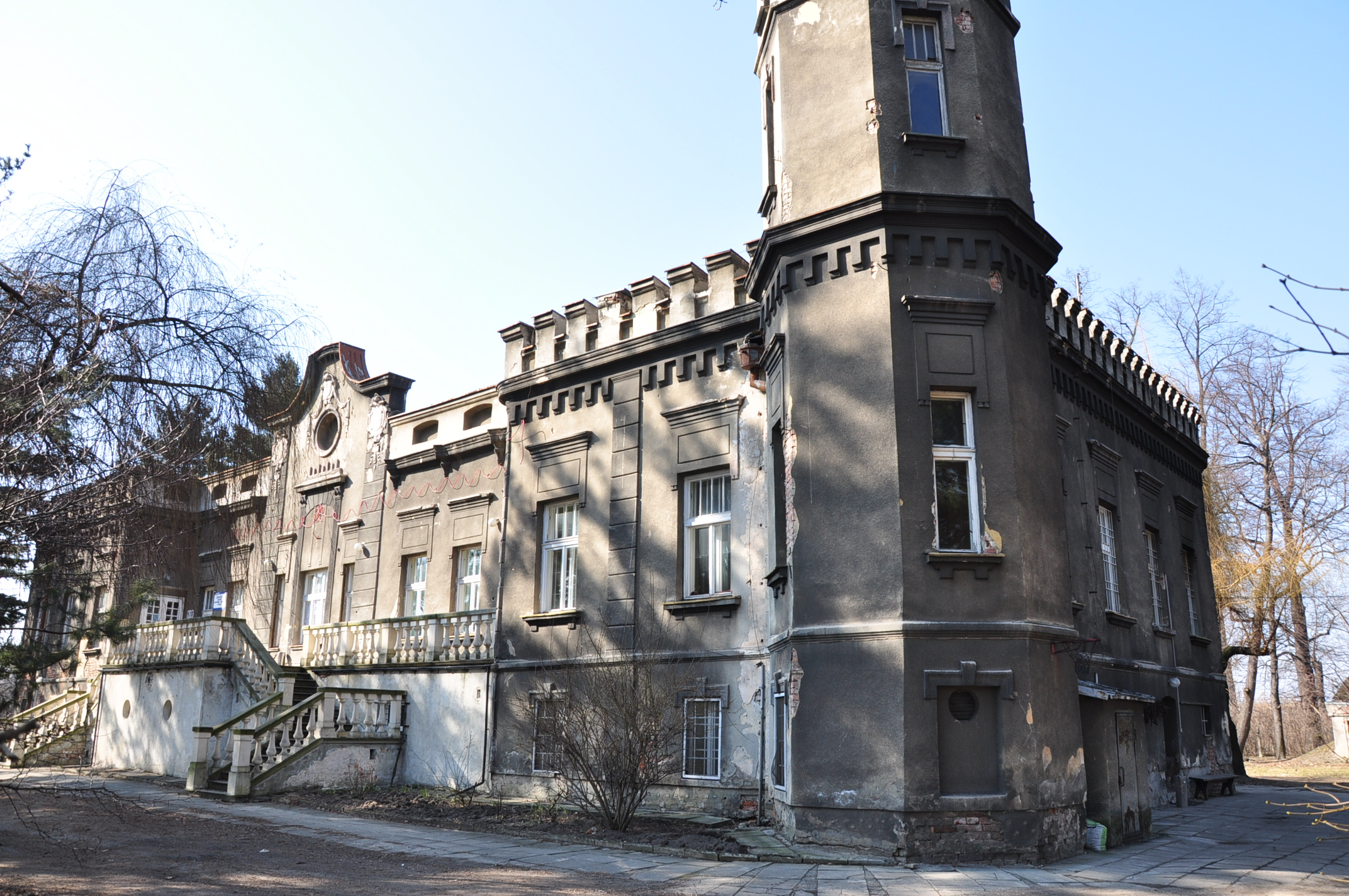
- Palace in Rajsko

- Coat of arms

- Location within Poland
- Coordinates: 50°0′N 19°11′E
- Country: Poland
- Voivodeship: Lesser Poland
- County: Oświęcim
- Gmina: Oświęcim
- First mentioned: 1272
- Elevation: 240 m (790 ft)
- Population: 1,440
- Time zone: UTC+1 (CET)
  - Summer (DST): UTC+2 (CEST)
- Vehicle registration: KOS

Rajsko [ˈrai̯skɔ] is a village in the administrative district of Gmina Oświęcim, within Oświęcim County, Lesser Poland Voivodeship, in southern Poland.

== History ==
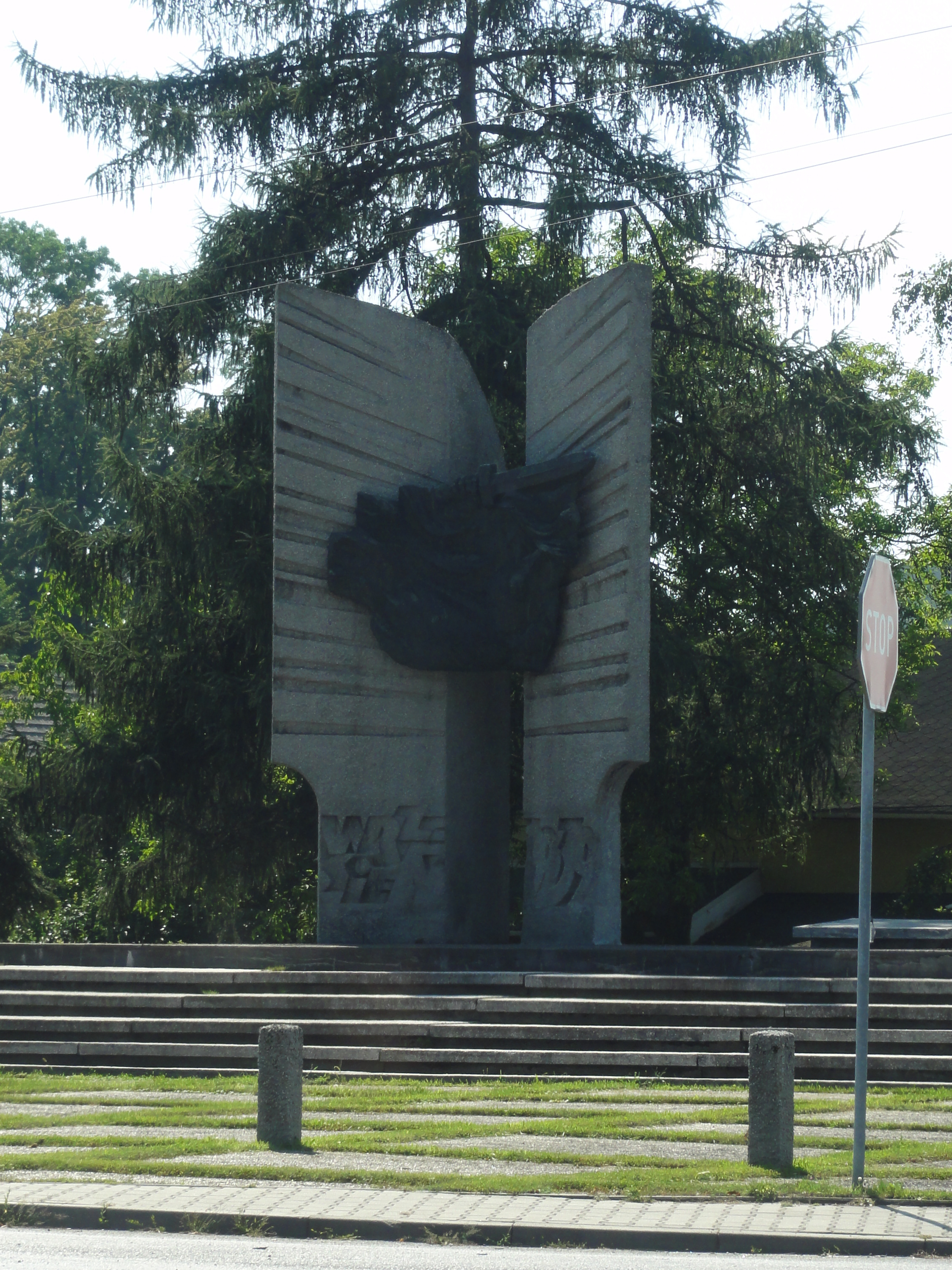
World War II memorial

The village was first mentioned in 1272 as Raysko in a Latin document when the village was bestowed by Władysław of Opole on Herman Surnagel in order to bring the settlement under German law.

It belonged at that time to the Duchy of Opole and Racibórz and the Castellany of Oświęcim. Subsequently, during the process of the feudal fragmentation of Poland it was absorbed in 1315 into the Duchy of Oświęcim, ruled by a branch of the Silesian Piast dynasty. In 1327 the duchy became a fee of the Kingdom of Bohemia. In 1457 Jan IV of Oświęcim agreed to sell the duchy to the Polish Crown, and in the accompanying document, issued on 21 February, the village was again mentioned as Raysko.

The territory of the Duchy of Oświęcim was eventually incorporated directly into the Kingdom of Poland in 1564 and made administratively part of the Silesian County in the Kraków Voivodeship in the Lesser Poland Province. With the First Partition of Poland in 1772 it was annexed by Austria, and made part of its newly formed Kingdom of Galicia. After World War I and the fall of Austria-Hungary it became again part of Poland, as the nation regained independence.

Following the joint German-Soviet invasion of Poland, which started World War II in September 1939, the village was occupied and annexed by Nazi Germany. In connection with the construction of the Auschwitz II-Birkenau death camp in nearby Brzezinka, in 1941, the occupiers expelled the entire Polish population of the village, which was initially deported to the nearby Pszczyna County, and afterwards either enslaved as forced labour or deported to the General Government in the more eastern part of German-occupied Poland. Vacated buildings were partially demolished, and a subcamp of the Auschwitz concentration camp was established in the village. Men and women of various nationalities and ethnicities, initially mostly Polish, but later also Jewish, Russian, French, Yugoslav and German, were held in the subcamp as forced labour. On January 18, 1945, the subcamp was dissolved and the prisoners were sent on a death march towards Wodzisław Śląski, from which they were eventually deported to the Ravensbrück concentration camp in Germany. After the war, the village was restored to Poland.

== People associated with the village ==
- The Polish lawyer, philosopher and publicist Jan Kanty Rzesiński was born here in 1803.
- Witold Silewicz (1921-2007), composer and classical double bass player was born here on the estate of his maternal grandparents, the Zwilling family. His musical career developed in Vienna, Austria.
