= August Klughardt =

German composer and conductor

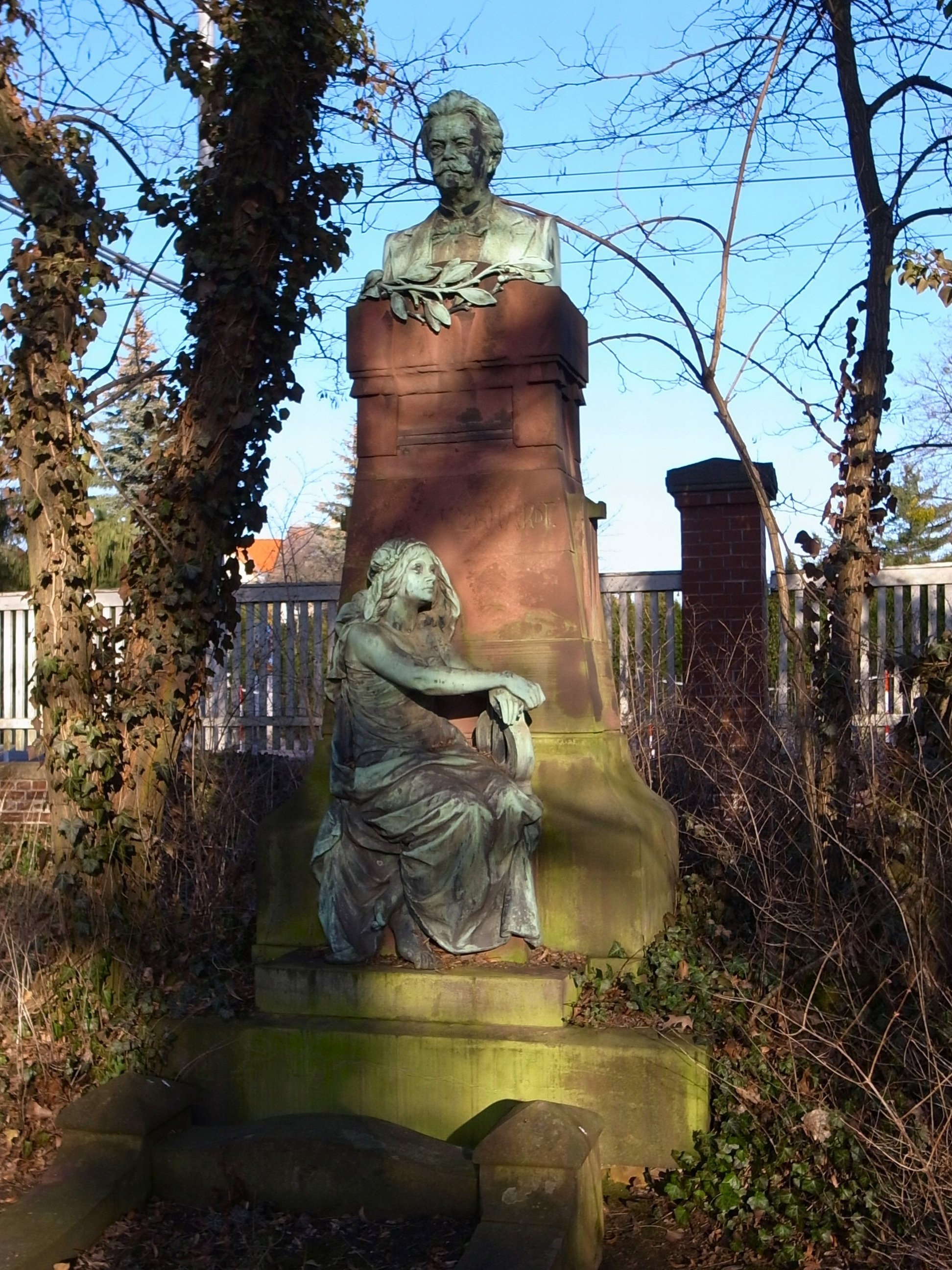
August Klughardt's memorial in Dessau

August Friedrich Martin Klughardt (30 November 1847 – 3 August 1902) was a German composer and conductor.

== Life ==
Klughardt, who was born in Köthen, took his first piano and music theory lessons at the age of 10. Soon he began to compose his first pieces, which were performed by a music circle Klughardt had founded himself at school. In 1863, his family moved to Dessau. One year later, Klughardt gave his debut as pianist.

After having finished school, he moved to Dresden in 1866. There, he took further lessons and brought his compositions to the public for the first time. One year later, he began to earn his living as a conductor. At first, he worked at the municipal theatre in Posen (Poznań) for one season, then in Neustrelitz for one season, and finally in Lübeck for several months. From 1869 to 1873, he worked at the court theatre in Weimar. There, he met Franz Liszt, which was very important for his creative development. In 1873, he returned to Neustrelitz where he became chief conductor. He was appointed manager in 1880. In 1876, he visited the first Bayreuth Festival.

From 1882 to the end of his life, he was director of music at the court in Dessau. In 1892 and 1893, he conducted Richard Wagner's Der Ring des Nibelungen. He received many distinctions in his last years: he was appointed member of the Berlin Academy of Arts in 1898 and he was made honorary doctor by the University of Erlangen. He was also asked to direct the Singakademie in Berlin, but he rejected this offer. Klughardt died suddenly in Roßlau at the age of 54.

== Style ==
Klughardt's meeting with Liszt established his enthusiasm for the music of the Neudeutsche Schule around Wagner and Liszt. Indeed, his works reflect some of their conceptions. Nevertheless, Klughardt did not shy away from keeping up genres which Wagner and Liszt rejected. He wrote six symphonies and a lot of chamber music. Likewise, he did not compose a single symphonic poem, a genre that was propagated by Liszt, but several more old-fashioned programmatic overtures. In fact, Robert Schumann's influence is probably more obvious in Klughardt's works.

He intended to create a synthesis of these dissimilar tendencies. In his operas, he used Wagner's leitmotif technique, but he held to the older number opera instead of Wagner's through-composed music-drama. Some of his compositions show Klughardt as a child of his times, for example his choral work Die Grenzberichtigung (The correction of the frontier), Op. 25, which was composed when Germany won the Franco-Prussian War in 1870/71. Altogether, Klughardt must be considered as a rather conservative composer in spite of his interest in more modern tendencies. Today, most of his output is nearly forgotten. Only his Cello concerto, his Schilflieder (Reed Songs) and his Wind quintet are played from time to time.

== Recordings ==
In 2011, the label CPO recorded his Symphony No. 3 in D major, Op. 37 and the Violin Concerto in D major, Op. 65 with the Dessau Anhalt Philharmonic Orchestra, soloist Miriam Tschopp and conductor Golo Berg. In 2016, it released the Symphony No. 4 in C Minor, Op. 57 and the Drei Stücke für Orchester, Op. 87, a series of three well-contrasted pieces (Capriccio, Gavotte, and Tarantelle), performed by the same orchestra but this time conducted by Antony Hermus. The Symphony No. 5 in C minor, Op. 71 was also recorded on CPO in 2013 with the same orchestra and conductor and also contains the Concert Overture in E "Im Frühling" (In Spring), Op. 30 and the Fest-Overture in E flat, Op. 78. Between 1975 and 1980 another label, Sterling, recorded the Concert Overture in G major, Op. 45, the Konzertstück for Oboe and Orchestra in F, Op. 18, the Cello Concerto in A minor, Op. 59 and the Suite for Orchestra, "Auf der Wanderschaft" (A Walk in the Countryside), Op. 67, an orchestration by the composer of an earlier piano suite that he composed after he and his wife holidayed in the Harz mountains; they are performed by Rolf-Julius Koch (oboe), Horst Beckedorf (cello) and the NDR Radiophilarmonie with three different conductors.

== Selected works ==
Wind Quintet Op. 79 in C major
I. Allegro non troppo

II. Allegro vivace

III. Andante Grazioso

IV. Allegro molto vivace
Performed by the Soni Ventorum Wind Quintet

=== Operas ===
- Mirjam, on a libretto by Albert Fromé, Op. 15 (c. 1870)
- Iwein, on a libretto by Karl Niemann, Op. 35 (1877/78)
- Gudrun, on a libretto by Karl Niemann, Op. 38 (1883)
- Die Hochzeit des Mönchs (The friar's wedding), on a libretto by Karl Niemann, Op. 48 (c. 1885)

=== Symphonies ===
- Waldleben (1871 symphony Life in the forest, withdrawn)
- Symphony No. 1 in D minor Lenore, Op. 27 (1873)
- Symphony No. 2 in F minor, Op. 34 (1876)
- Symphony No. 3 in D major, Op. 37 (1879)
- Symphony No. 4 in C minor, Op. 57 (1897)
- Symphony No. 5 in C minor, Op. 71 (1897, arrangement of the Sextet, Op. 58)

=== Concertante works ===
- Konzertstück for oboe and orchestra in F major, Op. 18 (c. 1870)
- Cello Concerto in A minor, Op. 59 (by 1892)
- Violin Concerto in D major, Op. 68 (c. 1895)
- Romance for bass clarinet and orchestra

=== Other works for orchestra ===
- Sophionisbe, ouverture, Op. 12 (1869)
- Huldigungs-Ouverture, Op. 24 (1873)
- Die Wacht am Rhein. Siegesouvertüre (The watch on the Rhine. Victory ouverture) in E♭ major, Op. 26 (1871)
- Concert Overture in E major Im Fruhling, Op. 30 (c. 1873)
- Fest-Marsch, Op. 33 (1874)
- Suite in A minor, Op. 40 (1883)
- Concert Overture in G major Op. 45 (1884)
- Auf der Wanderschaft (On the tramp), suite, Op. 67 (1896, originally for piano)
- Fest-Overture in E♭ major, Op. 78 (1897)

=== other vocal music ===
- Die Zerstörung Jerusalems (The destruction of Jerusalem), oratorio (c. 1898)
- Judith, oratorio (c. 1900)
- choral works
- songs

=== Chamber music ===
- String Quartet in F major, Op. 42 (c. 1883)
- String Quartet in D major, Op. 61 (c. 1890)
- String Quintet in G minor, Op. 62 (c. 1890)
- String Sextet in C♯ minor, Op. 58 (c. 1890, lost)
- Piano Trio in B♭ major, Op. 47 (c. 1885)
- Piano Quintet in G minor, Op. 43 (c. 1883)
- Schilflieder (Reed songs), 5 Fantasiestücke after poems by Lenau for piano, oboe and viola, Op. 28 (1872)
- Wind Quintet in C major, Op.79 (c. 1898)
