= Artecombo =

ArteCombo is a wind quintet that was formed in 2007. Its members are Mayu Sato (flute), Baptiste Gibier (oboe), Annelise Clément (clarinet), Cyril Normand (French horn), and Frank Sibold (bassoon).

Besides the traditional wind quintet repertoire (Ligeti, Hindemith, Françaix, etc.), ArteCombo plays its own arrangements (written by Frank Sibold) of pieces such as Gershwin’s An American in Paris. Composer Jean-Philippe Calvin wrote the wind quintet "Kleztet" for ArteCombo. ArteCombo also commissioned and performed the musical children's story "Caravane Gazelle", composed by Olivier Calmel.

ArteCombo won the second prize at the Henri Tomasi International Woodwind Quintet Competition in Marseille in 2011. Until now, ArteCombo has played mostly in France and Japan.

== Discography ==
- 2010: Caravane Gazelle, Hybrid'Music, with Julie Martigny (voc)
- 2011: Carnet de route, Hybrid'Music
