= Ljubica Marić =

Yugoslav and Serbian composer

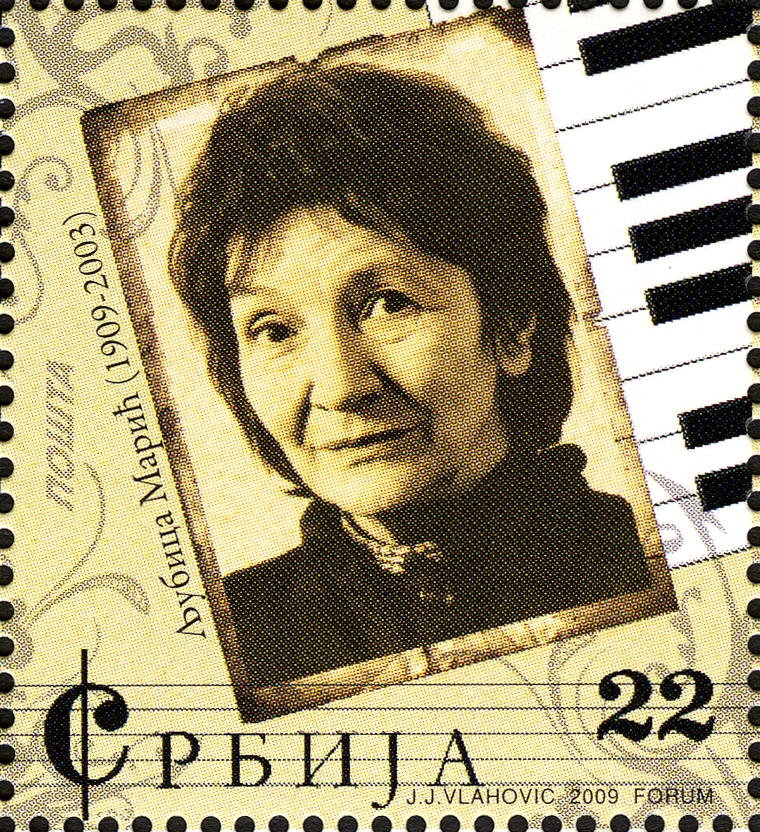
- Ljubica Marić on a 2009 Serbian stamp
- Born: 18 March 1909; Kragujevac, Kingdom of Serbia
- Died: 17 September 2003 (aged 94); Belgrade, Serbia and Montenegro
- Occupation: Composer

Ljubica Marić (Љубица Марић Serbian pronunciation: [ʎûbitsa mǎːritɕ], 18 March 1909 – 17 September 2003) was a composer from Yugoslavia. She was a pupil of Josip Štolcer-Slavenski. She was known for being inspired by Byzantine Orthodox church music. She was professor at the Faculty of Music in Belgrade and a member of the Serbian Academy of Sciences and Arts. Ljubica Marić is considered to be the most original Serbian composer of the twentieth century and musically the most influential one.

== Life ==
Born in Kragujevac, Serbia to Father Pavle and Mother Katarina née Đorđević, a descendant of Vojvoda Čolak-Anta Simeonović, one of the leaders of the First Serbian Uprising. Ljubica traveled a huge artistic and intellectual journey in order to facilitate the advancement of Serbian music. She was the first Serbian to get a diploma in composition in 1929. At the State Conservatory in Prague, she attended postgraduate studies under Josef Suk. While she was a student, she received praise in festivals in Amsterdam, Strasbourg and Prague.

She was described as a genially gifted woman, and her music was promoted by the great supporter of contemporary music, Hermann Scherchen. Her music was performed by the most important chamber ensembles and orchestras, and she was offered by Alois Hába a post of the associate professor at the Department for quartertone music at the Prague State Conservatory. World War II disrupted her international career so she spent most of her life in Belgrade, where she focused on composing more works. She was also engaged in visual arts, wrote philosophical poetry, worked as a professor of Belgrade Music Academy and a member of the Serbian Academy of Arts and Sciences.

Ljubica Marić was the first composer to use Byzantine church music in non-liturgical compositions. She synthesized medieval music with the avant-garde experience of 20th-century music in her work, creating pieces with philosophical lyrics. Her music announced the beginning of postmodernism and minimalism, and she is regarded as a precursor of Arvo Pärt and John Tavener.

Towards the end of her life, Ljubica Marić's music was again enthusiastically received in big European music centers of Netherlands, Germany and Great Britain. In Amsterdam a CD with her chamber music was published. The foundation KölnMusik commissioned her new composition, and publishing house Furore Verlag from Kassel produced scores of all her compositions. A CD with her most representative compositions was published by Chandos. Ljubica Marić is regarded by some as one of the most original creators from the second half of 20th century.

== Legacy ==
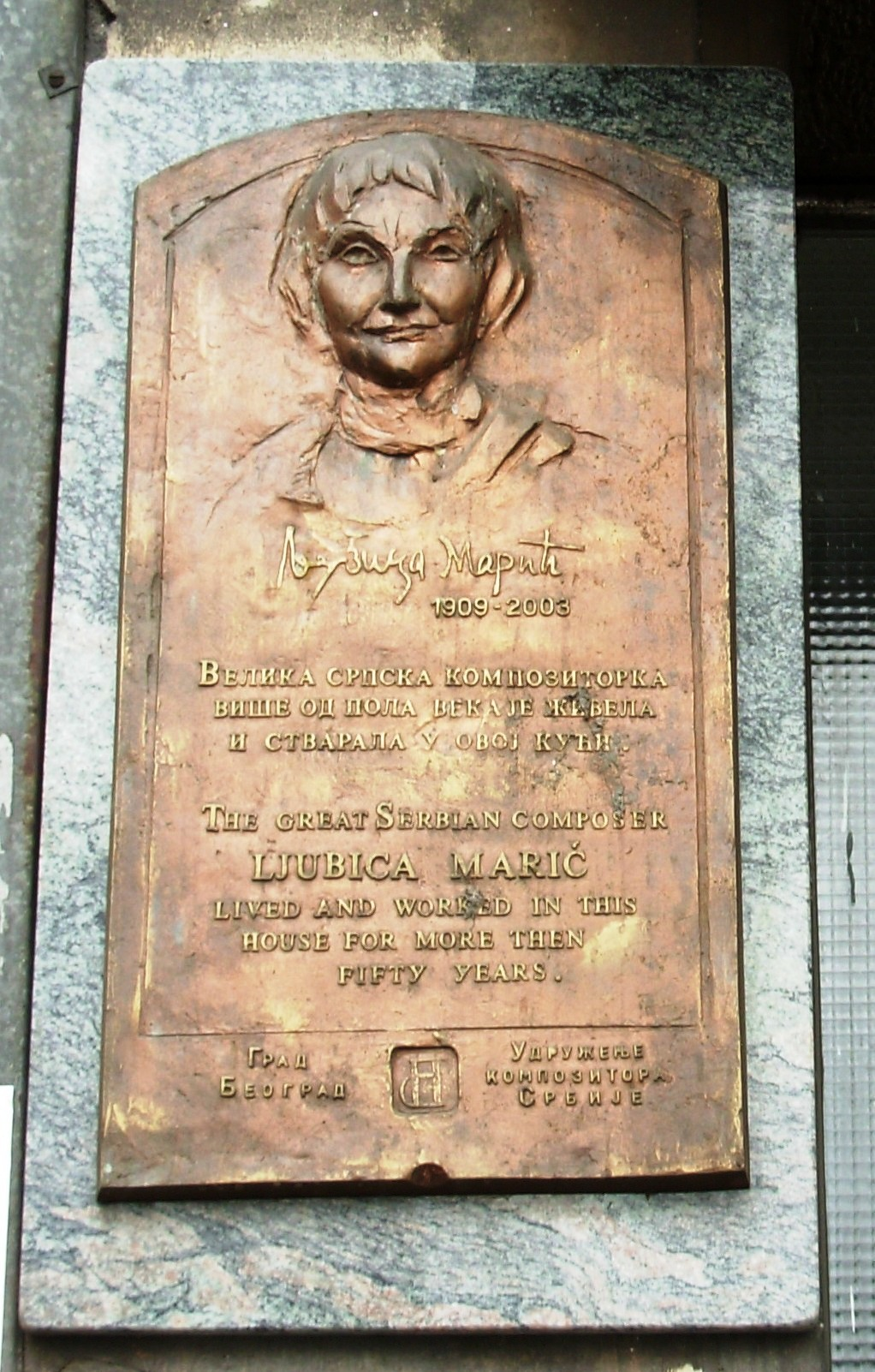
Plaque of Ljubica Marić on her Belgrade residence

In 2009, the Permanent Delegation of the Republic of Serbia to UNESCO requested that UNESCO should be associated with the 100th anniversary of the birth of Ljubica Marić.

Dmitry Shostakovich has characterized her works saying, “Ljubica Marić has used an entire arsenal of contemporary music in order to achieve a high goal. She speaks from the depth of her soul with clear and impressive language…” Her musical expression was praised by numerous other great artists of 20th century, such as Bartok, Lutoslawski, Haba, Nicolas Slonimsky, Hermann Scherchen and Marius Flothuis, considering Ljubica Marić's compositions among the greatest music creations of 20th century.

== List of compositions ==
- Sorrow for the Girl, for men choir (1928)
- Sonata fantasia, for violin solo (1928/29)
- String quartet (1930/31) – lost
- Wind quintet (1931)
- Music for Orchestra (1932)
- Suite, for quartertone piano (1936/37) – lost
- Trio, for clarinet, trombone and double bass (1937) – lost
- Sketches, for piano (1944) – lost
- Four improvisations and fugue's on the themes of Octoëchos, for piano (around 1944) – lost
- Three Preludes and Etude, for piano (1945, rev. 1997)
- Two songs, for mixed choir (1945) – lost(Romanija, The Mist)
- Triumphal March, for symphony orchestra (probably 1945) – lost
- Three folk songs, for mixed choir (1946)
- Children's Choirs (1946/64)(Chicken's Worries, Nightingale and the Hunters, Enigmas, Violet's Shortcoming)
- Song and Dance, for piano (1947)
- Branko's Round Dance, for piano (1947)
- Sonata for violin and piano (1948)
- Verses from “The Mountain Wreath”, for baritone and piano (1951)
- Songs of Space, cantata for mixed choir and symphony orchestra (1956)
- Passacaglia, for symphony orchestra (1957)
- Octoïcha 1, for symphony orchestra (1958/9, rev.1998)
- Byzantine Concerto, for piano and orchestra (1959)
- The Threshold of Dream, cantata for soprano, mezzo-soprano, narrator and chamber orchestra (1961)
- Ostinato super thema Octoïcha, for piano, harp and string orchestra (1963)
- Lament, Pastoral and Hymn, for mixed choir and instrumental ensemble, from the
- music for the speaking oratorio Words of Light (1962/66)(redaction Mirjana Živković, 2009)
- The Enchantress, melodic recitation for soprano and piano (1964)
- Song for the Flute (1976)
- Invocation, for double bass and piano (1983, rev. 1998)
- Monodia Octoïcha, for cello solo (1984)
- From the Darkness Chanting, recitative cantata for mezzo-soprano and piano (1984)
- Asymptote, for violin and string orchestra (1986)
- The Wondrous Milligram, for flute and soprano (1992)
- Archaia, for string trio (1992)
- Archaia 2, for wind trio (1993, rev. 1998)
- Torso, for piano trio (1996, rev. 1998)
