= Roman Dyboski =

Polish educator

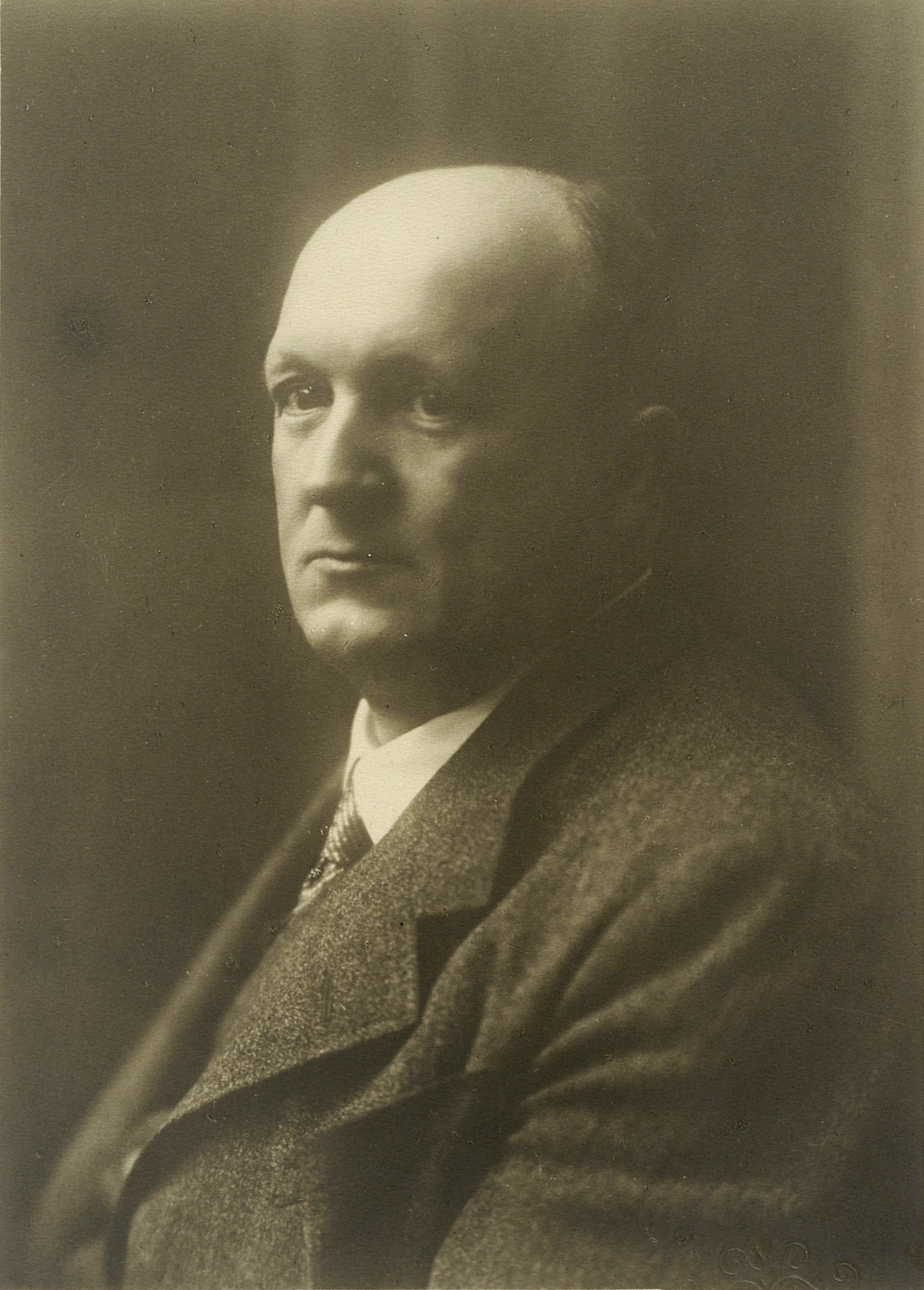
Roman Dyboski around 1925

Roman Dyboski (19 November 1883 in Cieszyn – 1 June 1945 in Kraków) was a Polish philologist and literature scholar. Professor at the Jagiellonian University since 1911. Member of the Polish Academy of Learning.

He was son of Antoni Dyboski and Maria Łopuszańska.

== Publications ==
- William Shakespeare. Krakowska Spółka Wydawnicza, 1927.
- O Anglji i Anglikach. Wyd. F. Hoesick, Warszawa, 1929.
- Knighthode and Bataile: A XVth Century Verse Paraphrase of Flavius Vegetius Renatus Treatise 'De Re Militari, Oxford (EETS), 1935.
- Między literaturą a życiem. 1936.
- Wielcy pisarze amerykańscy. Wyd. PAX, 1958.
