= Ludmila Yurina =

Ukrainian composer, pianist and musicologist. (born 1962)

Ludmila Yurina is a Ukrainian composer, pianist and musicologist, living in the United States.

== Biography ==
Ludmila Yurina was born in Uzyn, Ukraine, and graduated from Kyiv Music College as a pianist and from Kyiv State P.I.Tchaikovsky Conservatoire as a composer, completing her post-graduate studies there. In 2011 and 2023/24 she is visiting scholar at the Stanford University, CCRMA (USA).

She attended workshops with eminent musicians P-H. Dittrich, Irvine Arditti, H. Zapf, G. Stäbler, J. Durand at the Rheinsberg Music Academy as well as with Helmut Lachenmann and Wolfgang Rihm in Dresden.

She was the music director of the theatre studios Kolo and ARS and coordinator of the Organizing Committee of the International Youth Music Forum in Kyiv, Art-Director of the Meta-Art Ukrainian Contemporary Art Festival in Kyiv as well. Till 2025 Ludmila Yurina has worked as Associate Professor of Department of composition at the National Music Academy of Ukraine specialising in composition, orchestration, symphony scores reading ( and two courses/lectures). She was a guest-composer to flute master-course at the Rheinsberg Music Academy in 1999, was invited to give a lecture about contemporary Ukrainian music there in 1999, Staatliche Hochschule für Musik und Darstellende Kunst in Stuttgart (2006), in Texas Christian University (2008 and 2011), in City University New-York Graduate Center aka CUNY Graduate Center (2020) and in the Stanford University ( CCRMA, 2022). Since 2024, Yurina has been working at the Department of Music at Stanford University (composition).

Yurina's creative residences:

- Künstlerhof Schreyahn (Germany, 1998);
- Experimental Electronic Music Studio of Südwestrundfunk (Heinrich-Strobel-Stiftung, Freiburg, Germany, 1999);
- Visby International Centre for composers (or VICC) (Gotland, Sweden, 2005, 2006).

She got a grant from Fulbright Foundation for scholarship at Stanford University, 2011, CCRMA (USA).

Yurina participated in numerous international festivals; her works have been performed in Ukraine, Germany, France, USA, Canada, Italy, Finland, Estonia, Israel, Moldova, Mongolia, Poland, etc. She has collaborated with such well-known German performers as cellists Matthias Lorenz, Mathis Mayr (Mosaik Ensemble), trombonist Dirk Amrein, pianist Stefan Eder, Carin Levine, Sinfonietta Dresden, Neues Musik Ensemble Aachen, New music ensemble XelmYa, Ensemble Timbre Actuel (Germany). Her music also have been performed by Network for New Music Ensemble, San Francisco Chamber Composers Orchestra, MAVerick Ensemble, Symphony orchestra of Northwestern University, Karen Bentley Pollick, Edo Frenkel, Laura Ospina (USA), Borealis Brass (Canada), Pierre-Stephane Meuge (France), Ivo Nilsson (Sweden), Orchestra of Ukrainian Television and Broadcasting company, National Symphony Orchestra of Ukraine, Kyiv Camerata, the percussion ensemble ARS NOVA (Ukraine).

Recordings of her music were produced on the CD Two Days and Two Nights of New Music: Festivals 1998–2000 and by Radio Deutsche Welle (Germany), Ukrainian Independent Radio (Chicago, USA), WPRB (Princeton, USA), Canadian broadcasting (Edmonton) and the Ukrainian National TV and Radio Company. Her works are published by Muzychna Ukrajina Publishing House (Ukraine), Frederic Harris Music Publishing (Canada), Furore Verlag, Certosa Verlag (Germany), TEM Taukay Edition (Italy), Terem-music Verlag (Switzerland) and Donemus (Netherlands).

Ludmila Yurina is an organiser and co-director of the three festivals of contemporary Ukrainian music in USA - Fort-Worth- 2008, 2012 and of Ukrainian contemporary music festival in New-York-2020. She is a member of the National Ukrainian Composers’ Union, National Association of composers USA (NACUSA), IAWM, SEAMUS and ASCAP (USA).Since 2025 Yurina is a member of Board of Directors and Secretary of San Francisco Chapter NACUSA.

Since 2022 Yurina lives in USA, she works as music composition and piano teacher in Bay Area (California). Among her students are winners of international competitions in USA, Ukraine, Slovenia, Great Britain, Spain and Austria.

== Awards and grants ==
- Torneo Internationale di Musica- TIM competition( Italy, 1999)
- Baden-Württemberg Ministry of Research, Science and Art`grant (Baden-Baden, Germany, 2001);
- Lyatoshynsky Award ( Ukraine's Ministry of Culture, 2008)
- Kosenko Award ( Ukraine's Ministry of Culture, 2014)
- Lysenko Award ( Ukraine's Ministry of Culture, 2016)
- Swedish Institute`grants (2005, 2006)
- Fulbright Foundation grant (2010)

== Compositions ==
2024

- "Cuando la sirena se calma"(when the siren goes silent) for Piano:6`
- "Dead City Silence"" for flute, clarinet, piano, violin and violoncello :6`
- "San Francisco Capsule" for multichannel system : 13`
- "Stanford Capsule" for multichannel system : 12`
- "Hidden Lands", piano cycle : 11`

2022

- ”DUMA” for Violin: 6’
- ”Distant lands” for Violin and electronic: 6’

2016

- ”Geflimmer", trio for Oboe, Clarinet and Bassoon: 6'(2014/16)
- ”In Good Mood", Piano album for children (2016)

2015

- “Caricature”miniature for chamber ensemble :1`10
- ”Silicon Interferences” for flute, clarinet, piano, violin and violoncello : 7'

2014/15

- ”Lady Lazarus”, monoopera for soprano and piano on texts S.Plath, J.Joyce and R.Bach : 25'
- ”Archipelago”(dedicated to John Chowning) for piano and live-electronic : 8'
- ”Drift” (dedicated to Jon Appleton) for string orchestra, piano and percussions : 8'

2012

- ”Trombon(o)per(a)Dirk”for solo trombone : 7'

2010

- ”Bird Bennu' Songs” for flute, clarinet, violin and violoncello : 9'

2008

- ”EXISTENZA...” for dancers, electronic and video : 29'
- “Hunting for Brother”, music for radio-drama, text by V. Lyss : 10'

2007

- “Perseus-Betha-Algol” for e-guitar with processor and electronic : 8' 40
- “Pulsar” for violin : 8'

2005

- “Initiation”, cantata for baritone, mixed choir, and orchestra : 19' 30
- “Crystal” for symphony orchestra :9'

2004

- ”Visions of St. John Baptist” for string quartet : 8'
- “Angel of White Day”for Piano : 5'

2003\04

- ”That one, who entered into the circle” for symphony orchestra : 9'

2002

- ”Shadows of deep sleeping” for flute, oboe, piano, and cello : 11`20

2001

- ”Topos Uranios” for Harpsichord and live electronics: 8'
- “Kashmir”, version of "Led Zeppelin"'s song for symphony orchestra and rock instruments: 5'
- “Waterdreams” for Trombono, percussion, improvising Saxophono, video and pantomime: 11'

2000

- ”Irrlicht” for solo violoncello: 6'
- ”Klangillusion” for flute, piano, and violoncello: 8'

1999

- ”Quad”, electronic music to S. Becket's piece: 16'
- ”Shadows and Ghosts” for piano: 5'
- “Gemma” for solo flute: 6'

1998

- ”Funny Death”on A. Ginsberg's text for soprano, 2 microphones, and tam-tam: 5'
- ”Funny Death” on A. Ginsberg's text for 2 sopranos, 2 altos, 2 tenors, 2 baritones: 4'
- ”Glass-Elegy” for piano: 8'
- “Xing” for trombone, percussion, piano, and contrabass: 10'

1997

- ”Streams”, film music: 8'
- “As soon as possible...” ("Jaknajskorish...") for solo oboe: 6'
- “...end-les...” for symphony orchestra: 8'

1996

- “Ein kleiner Marsch mit grossem Wecker” for children's percussion ensemble: 6'
- “Distanzierung” for 2 violoncellos: 8'

1995

- Signore Beresciolo, chamber symphony (restoration and edition) for 2 oboes, chamber orchestra
- ”Ritornelli” (dedicated to Valentin Silvestrov) for Piano: 5'
- ”The End of the Game or Provocations” for clarinet, piano, violin, and violoncello: 7'

1993

- “Geometricum”for flute, oboe, clarinet, bassoon, and horn : 14'
- “Ekagrata” for four groups of percussion: 15'
- ”Ran-Nan” for 19 strings: 11'

1992

- ”The Garden of the Shadows”, film music: 12'
- ”Disintegrations” for solo trombone: 8'

1991

- ”Rao Noala” for soprano, flute, vibraphone, piano, and violin: 11'
- 1987—1991 “Jazz Fiesta”, children's piano album: 30'

1989

- Concerto for solo trombone and symphony orchestra 17'

1987

- ”Two Jazz Etudes for Children” for piano: 2'
- 1984—1987 “Ukrainian Echo”, five pieces for piano: 6'

1985

- “Town and Country”, three pieces for piano: 5'

== Articles ==
- "Like Ulysses...", magazine Art-Line No. 9, 1996, Kyiv, Ukraine;
- "Ukrainian women-composers in the world context", Scientific news (National music Academy of Ukraine), issue 75, Kyiv, 2009;
- "About some problems of improvisation in music of Hans-Joachim Hespos" ,Kyiv musicology, issue 30, Kyiv R.Glyer's music Institute, pages 184–189, Kyiv 2009 http://glierinstitute.org/ukr/digests/030/21.pdf
- "'Гелікоптер-квартет' К. Штокгаузена: особливості концепції і виконання" ("Helicopter-String Quartet" by K. Stockhausen: features of conception and performance), Ukrainian musicology no. 42, NMAU 2016. archive from 13 July 2019 of original
- "About textural features of Helmut Lachenmann's "Trio Fluido", Lviv, annual science issue #30, pages 129–133, 2013 ISSN 2310-0583
- "Modern Ukrainian Music: 1980–2000" – Ex Tempore magazine, USA, 2008 http://www.ex-tempore.org/yurina.htm
- "Stepping by planet CCRMA" (in Ukrainian) http://mus.art.co.ua/krokuyuchy-planetoyu-karma/
- "Ukrainian-German intersections: the aesthetics of Mauricio Kagel as an impulse for Serhii Zazhytko's creative experiments",Kyiv musicology annual issue, #59,2019, pages 100-111, https://kyivmusicology.com/index.php/journal/article/view/100
