= Ramiro Cortés =

American composer

Ramiro Cortés Jr. (25 November 1933 – 2 July 1984) was an American composer.

Cortés was born in Dallas, Texas, in 1933 to Ramiro Cortés, Sr. and Elvira Cortés (née Acosta). He studied with Henry Cowell, Richard Donovan, Ingolf Dahl, Vittorio Giannini, Roger Sessions, Halsey Stevens, and, in Rome on a Fulbright Fellowship, with Goffredo Petrassi. He worked for a brief period in the 1960s as a computer programmer, and then taught composition at the University of California, Los Angeles (1966–67), University of Southern California (1967–72), and the University of Utah (1972–84). He died of heart failure in Salt Lake city on 2 July 1984.

His earlier compositions employed serial technique, but beginning in the late 1960s he turned to a freer form of chromatic atonality. He was "perhaps the first Mexican-American composer of classical music to earn an international reputation."

== Works (selective list) ==
- Piano Sonata no. 1 (1954)
- Sinfonia sacra (1954/59) Premiered in 1954 at USC's Diamond Jubilee concert.
- Yerma, Symphonic Portrait of a Woman (1955). Premiered Nov 23, 1955 by the Los Angeles Philharmonic, after winning a composition prize by the Philharmonic's Women's Committee.
- Three Pieces for Piano
- Suite for Piano
- The Falcon, for soprano and piano. A setting of the Corpus Christi Carol.
- Chamber Concerto for Cello and 12 Winds (1957–58/78)
- Prometheus, opera, after Aeschylus (1960)
- String Quartet no. 1 (1962)
- Three Movements for Five Winds, for wind quintet (1967–68)
- Rêve parisien (text: Baudelaire), for soprano and string quartet (1971–72)
- Concerto for Piano and Orchestra (1975)
- Piano Sonata no. 3 (1979)
- String Quartet no. 2 (1983)
- Music for Strings (1983)

== Sources ==
- Hitchcock, H. Wiley and Michael Meckna. 2001. "Cortés, Ramiro". Grove Music Online ed. L. Macy (Accessed 28 June 2007), <http://www.grovemusic.com> (subscription access).
- Pitt, Roland Charles. 1990. "The Piano Music of Ramiro Cortés." DMA Dissertation. Austin: University of Texas.
- Ramiro Cortés papers and recordings in University of Utah's J. Willard Marriott Library Special Collections
