= A Boy Was Born =

Choral composition by Benjamin Britten

- Choral variations for unaccompanied voices
- by Benjamin Britten
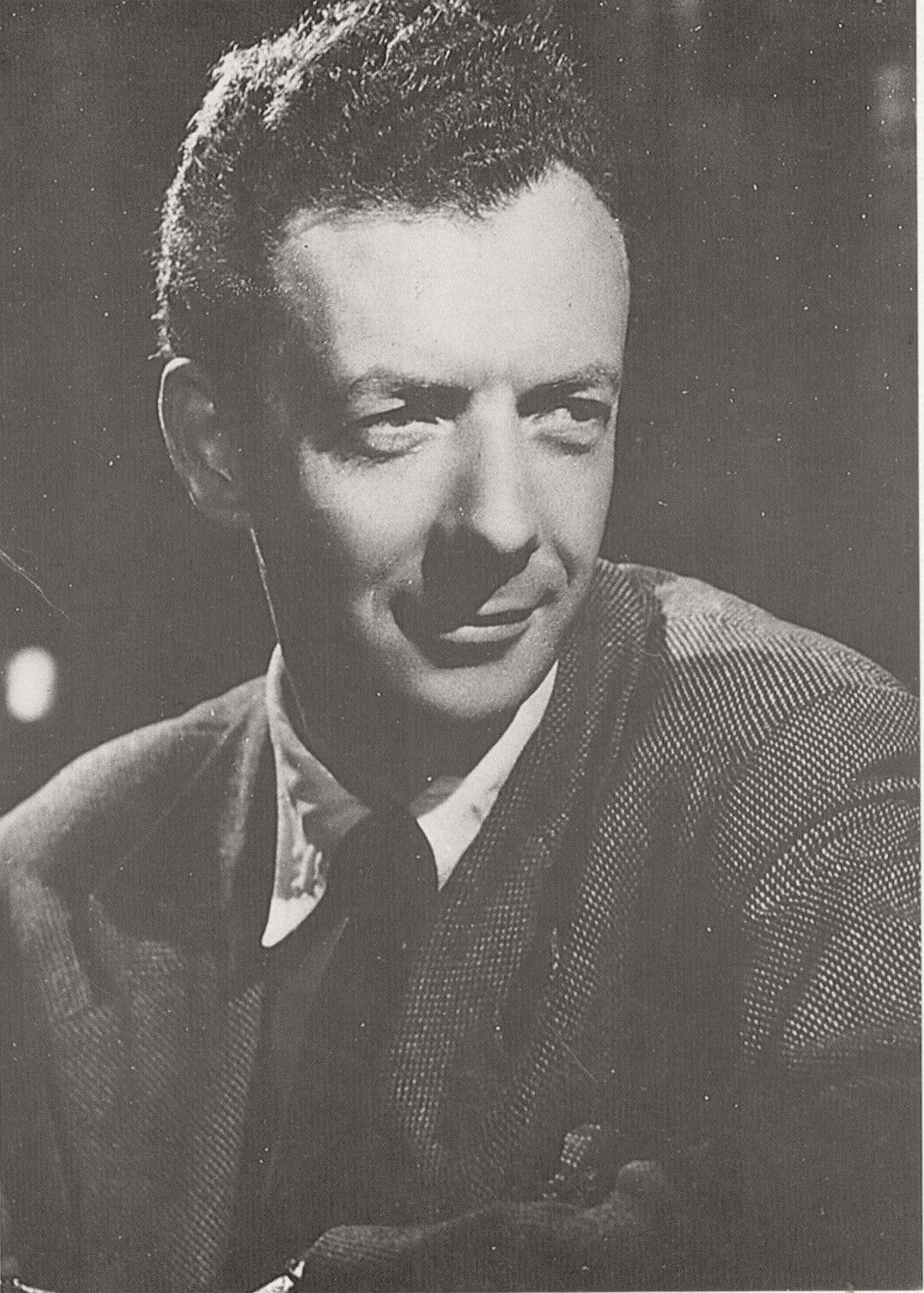
- Benjamin Britten in the 1940s
- Opus: 3
- Text: Ten texts, mostly from the 15th and 16th century
- Composed: 1933; revised 1955
- Dedication: "To my Father"
- Performed: 23 February 1934
- Vocal: four-part choir (SATB); boys' choir

A Boy Was Born, (Note: The composition was originally published as A Boy was Born, with a lower-case w, in an era before orthographic norms regarding capitalization of verbs in titles of works had entirely solidified in English-language publishing.) Op. 3, is a choral composition by Benjamin Britten. Subtitled Choral variations for men's, women's and boys' voices, unaccompanied (organ ad lib), it was originally composed from 1932 to 1933. It was first performed on 23 February 1934 as a BBC broadcast. Britten revised the work in 1955. The composer set different texts related to Christmas to music as theme and variations, scored for an a cappella choir with boys' voices.

== History and versions ==
Britten composed A Boy Was Born at age 19 as a student at the Royal College of Music. He wrote it between 25 November 1932 and 11 May 1933. His last project at the college, it is his first major vocal work and his first mature work on religious themes. He dedicated it to his father.

The work is in the form of a musical theme and six variations setting ten different texts dating mostly from the 16th century, with one by Christina Rossetti from the 19th century, so forming the first of his "poetic anthology" works. Variation structures particularly appealed to Britten: even before composing A Boy Was Born, he had started a set of variations for string orchestra which he was later to complete as the Variations on a Theme of Frank Bridge. Later he was to compose a set of variations for his Piano Concerto, and his opera The Turn of the Screw is extensively based on the variation principle.

Texts of A Boy Was Born
| Movement | Title | Author |
|---|---|---|
| Theme | A boy was born | Anon. 16th century |
| Variation 1 | Lullay, Jesu | Anon. before 1536 |
| Variation 2 | Herod | Anon. before 1529 |
| Variation 3 | Jesu, as Thou art our saviour | Anon. 15th century |
| Variation 4 | The Three Kings | Anon. 15th century |
| Variation 5 | In the Bleak Midwinter | Christina Rossetti |
| Variation 5 | Corpus Christi Carol | Anon. before 1536 |
| Variation 6 (Finale) | Noel!, Welcome Yule | Anon. 16th century |
| Variation 6 (Finale) | Christmas | Thomas Tusser |
| Variation 6 (Finale) | A Christmas Carol | Francis Quarles |

A Boy Was Born was first performed on 23 February 1934 in a BBC radio concert of contemporary music. Leslie Woodgate conducted the Wireless Chorus and choirboys of St Mark's, North Audley Street, London. Sir Edward Elgar died the same day.

The work takes about 32 minutes to perform. It was among Britten's first compositions to be published, by Chester Music. Britten revised it in 1955. This version was first performed on 22 November 1955 in London at the Grosvenor Chapel, by the Purcell Singers conducted by Imogen Holst. Britten himself conducted a recording with Michael Hartnett (treble), the Purcell Singers, boys' voices of the English Opera Group, and the choir of All Saints. In 1957–58, Ralph Downes added an organ part.

In 2013, celebrating Britten's centenary, A Boy Was Born was performed by the BBC Singers and the Temple Church Choir at The Proms, conducted by David Hill.

Festivals in Sheffield and Birmingham in 2013, in honour of the centenary of Britten's birth, were named after the composition.

== Music ==
Britten displayed in the elaborate work his skill in composition and the handling of words. He composed six choral variations on the first four notes sung by the sopranos:

Paul Spicer notes about the key: "Theoretically in D, the work, like most of Britten’s music, is as much modal as diatonic, though his modality bears little relationship to that of the English pastoralists—Vaughan Williams and the rest—who were then at their most influential." He mentions Alban Berg as a composer who influenced Britten's variation techniques such as augmentation and inversion of motifs.

The first variation is in the form of a dialogue between Mary (women's voices) and the child (boys). Variation 2 tells of the Massacre of the Innocents with jerky rhythms, altering and distorting the original theme. In variation 3 a semi-chorus sings the text, "Jesu, as Thou art our saviour", punctuated four times by a boy (or boys) singing "Jesu" as a melisma. Variation 4, about the three kings, has the theme as a wordless background flow to the narrative, picturing a distant procession. Variation 5, set for upper voices only, opens with Christina Rossetti's "In the Bleak Midwinter" sung by women's voices, whose parts 'clashing' in seconds suggest the cold while their descending phrases suggest the falling snow: against this, the boys choir sings an artlessly folk-like setting of the Corpus Christi Carol. Variation 6 is in the form of a lively rondo, one of the most complex to perform as it divides into eight distinct voice parts, followed by a recollection of the earlier variations and final return of the original theme.

The choral writing is demanding. Spicer points out that the boys' choir has to be a separate group but should be positioned not far from the mixed choir because of their intricate relationship.

== See also ==
- "Puer natus in Bethlehem", a medieval Latin Christmas hymn
