= Fukushū =

Fukushū (Japanese: 復讐, romanized: fukusiu, fukusuu, fukushū, lit. 'revenge, vengeance', ふくしう, ふくしゅう) may refer to:

== Songs ==
- "Fukushū" (復讐, Revenge), a 2011 song by Supercell off the album Today Is a Beautiful Day
- "Vengeance" (復讐, Fukushū), a 2007 song by Tokyo Jihen off the album Variety (Tokyo Jihen album)

== Episodes ==
- "Revenge" (復讐, Fukushū), 2022 episode 7 of Japanese TV anime cartoon World's End Harem
- "Revenge" (復讐, Fukushū), 2006 episode 9 of Japanese TV anime cartoon 009-1

== Other uses ==
- "Fukushu" (Revenge), a short film in the 893239 ("Yakuza-Nijūsan-Ku", ヤクザ23区) film series
- "Revenge" (復讐, Fukushū, ふくしゅう), serial chapter 38 of Japanese serialized manga comic World's End Harem; see List of World's End Harem volumes

== See also ==
- Revenge (disambiguation)
- Vengeance (disambiguation)
