= Avenger class =

Avenger class may refer to:

- Avenger-class escort carrier, a class of four World War II ships: three British, one American
- Avenger-class mine countermeasures ship, a class of American ships in the 1980s and 1990s

== See also ==
- USS Avenger for American warships with the name
- HMS Avenger for British warships with the name
