= Avenger =

Avenger(s) or The Avenger(s) may refer to:

== Arts and entertainment ==
=== Marvel Comics universe ===
==== The Avengers film series ====
- The Avengers (2012 film), an American superhero film
  - The Avengers (soundtrack)
- Avengers: Age of Ultron, a 2015 American superhero film
- Avengers: Infinity War, a 2018 American superhero film
- Avengers: Endgame, a 2019 American superhero film
- Avengers: Doomsday, a forthcoming 2026 American superhero film
- Avengers: Secret Wars, a forthcoming 2027 American superhero film

==== Other uses in marvel comics universe ====
- Avengers (comics), a team of superheroes
  - Avengers (Marvel Cinematic Universe), a central team of protagonist superheroes of "The Infinity Saga"
  - Avengers (comics) in other media
- The Avengers (comic book), several titles
- The Avengers: United They Stand, also known as The Avengers, a 1999 animated TV series
- The Avengers: Earth's Mightiest Heroes, a 2010 animated TV series
- The Avengers (video game), planned for 2012 but unreleased
- Marvel's Avengers (video game), 2020

=== Other uses in arts and entertainment ===
==== Fictional characters ====
- Avenger (comics), a fictional character in Magazine Enterprises comic book The Avenger
- Avenger (pulp-magazine character), in The Avenger 1939–1942
- Crimson Avenger, multiple fictional characters in the DC Comics universe
- Avenger, in visual novel video game Fate/hollow ataraxia
- Avenger, in 1960s TV series Birdman and the Galaxy Trio
- Avenger, in the 2000s TV series Harvey Birdman, Attorney at Law
- Avenger, in AC Comics' Sentinels of Justice
- Avenger, in Way of the Tiger series of gamebooks, and the title of the first book

==== Film ====
- The Avenger (1931 film), an American Western
- The Avenger (1933 film), an American drama
- The Avenger (1937 film), an Australian film
- The Avengers (1942 film), American title of The Day Will Dawn
- The Avengers (1950 film), an American swashbuckler film
- The Avenger (1960 film), or Der Rächer, a West German film
- The Avenger (1962 film), or La leggenda di Enea, a 1962 Italian film
- The Avengers (1998 film), an American adaptation of the British TV series
- Avenger (film), a 2006 adaptation of Frederick Forsyth's novel

==== Television ====
===== Episodes =====
- "Avenger", Absolute Duo episode 3 (2015)
- "Avenger", Dirty Linen season 2, episode 63 (2023)
- "The Avenger", 26 Men season 2, episode 12 (1958)
- "The Avenger", Bonanza season 1, episode 26 (1960)
- "The Avenger", Cannon season 4, episode 7 (1974)
- "The Avenger", Dixon of Dock Green series 11, episode 26 (1965)
- "The Avenger", Dynasty (1981) season 5, episode 13 (1985)
- "The Avenger", Falcon Crest season 3, episode 27 (1984)
- "The Avenger", Hudson's Bay episode 9 (1959)
- "The Avenger", Jungle Jim episode 22 (1956)
- "The Avenger", Outlaws (1960) season 1, episode 22 (1961)
- "The Avenger", Starsky & Hutch season 4, episode 7 (1978)
- "The Avenger", The Adventures of William Tell episode 56 (1959)
- "The Avenger", The Assets episode 8 (2014)
- "The Avenger", The Californians season 1, episode 4 (1957)
- "The Avenger", The Defenders (1961) season 2, episode 9 (1962)
- "The Avenger", The Forest Rangers season 3, episode 11 (1964)
- "The Avenger", The Lone Ranger (1949) season 5, episode 18 (1957)
- "The Avenger", The Lone Ranger (1966) episode 22a (1967)
- "The Avenger", Trackdown season 2, episode 9 (1958)
- "The Avenger", Walker, Texas Ranger season 3, episode 19 (1992)
- "The Avengers", Alcoa Presents One Step Beyond season 3, episode 28 (1961)
- "The Avengers", Gunsmoke season 11, episode 14 (1965)
- "The Avengers", Sugarfoot season 2, episode 18 (1959)
- "The Avengers", The Cowboys episode 5 (1974)
- "The Avengers", The O.C. season 4, episode 1 (2006)
- "The Avengers", Wire Service episode 10 (1956)

===== Shows =====
- The Avengers (TV series), a British series, 1961–1969
- Avenger (TV series), a Japanese anime series

==== Gaming ====
- Avenger (1981 video game)
- Avengers (1987 video game)
- Avenger (Dungeons & Dragons), a character class
- Avenger (1986 video game), also called Way of the Tiger II: Avenger
- Avengers (TimeLords), supplement for role-playing game TimeLords

==== Literature ====
- The Avenger (novel), by Edgar Wallace, 1926
- Avenger (Shatner novel), a 1997 Star Trek novel by William Shatner
- Avenger (Forsyth novel), 2003, by Frederick Forsyth
- The Avengers, a nonfiction 1968 book by Michael Bar-Zohar
- The Avengers: A Jewish War Story, a 2000 nonfiction book by Rich Cohen

==== Music ====
- Avenger (British band), a heavy metal band
- Avengers (band), an American punk rock band
  - Avengers (EP), 1979
  - Avengers (album), 1983
- The Avengers (New Zealand band), a rock band
- Rage (German band), formerly named Avenger
- The Avenger (album), 1999, by Amon Amarth
- Corporate Avenger, an American rap rock band

==== Radio ====
- The Avengers (radio series), a South African spin-off of the TV programme
- The Avenger (radio program), the name of two American 1940s radio crime dramas

==== Sculpture ====
- The Avanger (sculpture), a 1988 statue

== Groups ==
- Lesbian Avengers, a direct action group
- Los Justicieros, a Spanish anarchist group
- White Eagles (paramilitary), or Avengers, a Serbian paramilitary group

== Sports ==
- 2024 United States men's Olympic basketball team, nicknamed "The Avengers"
- Los Angeles Avengers, an Arena Football League team from 2000-2008

== Military ==
=== Aircraft ===
- Avro Avenger, a British 1920s biplane fighter
- General Atomics Avenger, an American developmental unmanned combat air vehicle
- Grumman TBF Avenger, a World War II American torpedo bomber
- McDonnell Douglas A-12 Avenger II, a proposed American attack aircraft

=== Ships ===
- Avenger-class escort carrier, a class of British and American World War II ships
- Avenger-class mine countermeasures ship, of the U.S. Navy
- HMS Avenger, several Royal Navy ships
- USS Avenger, several U.S. Navy ships

=== Tanks ===
- Avenger (tank), a development of the Cruiser Mk VIII Challenger

=== Weaponry ===
- GAU-8 Avenger, an aircraft cannon
- AN/TWQ-1 Avenger, an American surface-to-air missile system

== Transportation ==
=== Air transport ===
- Airborne Avenger, an American ultralight aircraft
- Avenger Field, an airport in Texas, U.S.
- Fisher Avenger, a Canadian ultralight aircraft

=== Vehicles ===
- Avenger (truck), an American monster truck
- Argo Avenger, a Canadian all-terrain vehicle
- Bajaj Avenger, an Indian motorcycle
- Dodge Avenger, an American car
- Jeep Avenger, a sport utility vehicle
- Fiberfab Avenger GT, an American kit car
- Hillman Avenger, later Chrysler Avenger and Talbot Avenger, a car
- Kawasaki A7 Avenger, a Japanese motorcycle

== See also ==
- Avenge (disambiguation)
- Avenged (disambiguation)
- Avengers Assemble (disambiguation)
- Dark Avenger (disambiguation)
- French ship Vengeur ("Avenger'), several ships
- The New Avengers (disambiguation)
- Vendicatori (Italian, 'Avengers'), a 12th-century Sicilian secret society
