= Avenge =

Avenge may refer to:

== Music ==
- "Avenge" (1994), a song by Ivy.
- "Avenge" (2009), a song from Today We Are All Demons by Combichrist, American aggrotech / industrial metal.

== Other uses ==
- USS Avenge, several American ships so named
- Motto of No. 94 Squadron RAF
- "Avenge", a brand of the herbicide difenzoquat

== See also ==
- Avenged (disambiguation)
- Avenger (disambiguation)
