= Reprisal (disambiguation) =

A reprisal is a limited violation in the laws of war to punish the enemy for committing an unprovoked violation. Reprisal may also refer to:

== Arts and entertainment ==
- The Reprisal, a 1757 play by Tobias Smollett
- Reprisal!, a 1956 American film directed by George Sherman
- Reprisal (novel), a 1991 novel by F. Paul Wilson
- Reprisal (2018 film), a 2018 American thriller film
- Reprisal (TV series), a Hulu TV series starting in 2019

== Other uses ==
- Reprisal operations (Israel), raids carried out by Israel in the 1950s and 1960s in response to fedayeen infiltration attacks
- USS Reprisal, the name of two different US Navy ships.

== See also ==
- Retaliation (disambiguation)
- Retribution (disambiguation)
