= Vigilantism =

Act of preventing and punishing crimes without legal authority

Vigilantism (/ˌvɪdʒɪˈlæntɪzəm/) is an act commonly summarized as "taking the law into one's own hands" which, according to Merriam Webster, means "to try to punish someone for breaking a law even though one does not have the right to do that." A vigilante is a person who practices or partakes in vigilantism.

== Definition ==
The term is borrowed from Spanish vigilante, which means 'watcher', from Latin vigilāns. There are many different attempts to define what constitutes vigilantism and how can it be distinguished from acceptable forms of helping law enforcement without any legal authority, such as citizen's arrest and private investigation.

According to political scientist Regina Bateson, vigilantism is "the extralegal prevention, investigation, or punishment of offenses." The definition has three components:

1. Extralegal: Vigilantism is done outside of the law (not necessarily in violation of the law)
2. Prevention, investigation, or punishment: Vigilantism requires specific actions, not just attitudes or beliefs
3. Offense: Vigilantism is a response to a perceived crime or violation of an authoritative norm

Other scholars have defined "collective vigilantism" as "group violence to punish perceived offenses to a community."

Les Johnston argues that vigilantism has six necessary components:

- it is planned or premeditated
- it is carried out by private volunteers
- it is a social movement
- it involves or threatens the use of force
- it occurs when established societal norms are perceived to be threatened
- its primary goal is to enforce safety and security, especially to its participants, by combating crime

== History ==
Vigilantism and the vigilante ethos existed long before the word vigilante was introduced into the English language. There are conceptual parallels between the medieval aristocratic custom of private war or vendetta and the modern vigilante philosophy.

Elements of the concept of vigilantism can be found in the biblical account in Genesis 34 of the abduction and rape (or, by some interpretations, seduction) of Dinah, the daughter of Jacob, in the Canaanite city of Shechem by the eponymous son of the ruler, and the violent reaction of her brothers Simeon and Levi, who slew all of the males of the city in revenge, rescued their sister and plundered Shechem. When Jacob protested that their actions might bring trouble upon him and his family, the brothers replied "Should he [i.e., Shechem] treat our sister as a harlot?"

In the Western literary and cultural tradition, characteristics of vigilantism have often been vested in folkloric heroes and outlaws (e.g., Robin Hood).

During medieval times, punishment of felons was sometimes exercised by such secret societies as the courts of the Vehm (cf. the medieval Sardinian Gamurra later become Barracelli, the Sicilian Vendicatori and the Beati Paoli), a type of early vigilante organization, which became extremely powerful in Westphalian Germany during the 15th century.

=== Vigilantism in Mexico ===
In some regions of Mexico, mainly in the state of Michoacan, people affected by criminal groups like Los Zetas and La Familia Michoacana, created vigilante groups called Grupos de autodefensa comunitaria in 2013. Their most well-known leader Hipólito Mora, was assassinated in 2023.

=== Other notable acts of vigilantism ===
- In the early 20th century, the White Finns founded the Suojeluskunta (Protection Corps) as a paramilitary vigilante organization in Finland. It formed the nucleus of the White Army in the Finnish Civil War.
- A number of vigilante organizations were founded in the US around the time of World War I including the American Protective League, National Security League, Knights of Liberty, and Boy Spies of America, with the goal of targeting those suspected to be pro-German or insufficiently loyal. Violent events by such groups included the Tulsa Outrage, the lynching of Olli Kinkkonen, and a number of other tarring and feathering events such as those in Wisconsin.
- In the 1920s, the Big Sword Society of China protected life and property in a state of anarchy.
- The Secret Six, a well-funded vigilante effort launched by the Chicago Association of Commerce in 1930, investigated and solved kidnappings, extortions, bombings, robberies, and other crimes, helped launch Eliot Ness and his Untouchables, was credited by Al Capone for destroying his illegal liquor empire, inspired The Secret Six movie, and was briefly emulated in cities across the nation until it was brought down by errors and scandal in 1933.
- After World War II, many alleged Nazi collaborators were beaten up or killed for their activities by vigilantes.
- Recognized since the 1980s, Sombra Negra ("Black Shadow") of El Salvador is a group of mostly retired police officers and military personnel whose sole duty is to cleanse the country of impure social elements by killing criminals and gang members. Along with several other organizations, Sombra Negra are a remnant of the death squads from the civil war of the 1970s and 1980s.
- On the 5th of May, 1981 Marianne Bachmeier pulled out a handgun from the right side of her trench coat and shot her seven year old daughter's sexual abuser and murderer dead during his trial in the courtroom of Lübeck District Court.
- On March 16, 1984, Gary Plauché shot and killed Jeff Doucet, who was set to be arraigned on charges of aggravated kidnapping of Plauché's son. The case received wide publicity because some people questioned whether Plauché - acting on his belief Doucet had been sexually abusing his son - should have been charged with murder.
- In the Philippines in the mid-eighties, the Alsa Masa and the Kuratong Baleleng were formed to fight Communist insurgents.
- During the 1990s, the group City without Drugs publicly beat and murdered drug dealers and forced addicts to quit doing drugs in the city of Yekaterinburg, Russia.
- On the 28th of November, 1994, Jeffrey Dahmer, an infamous Milwaukee serial killer and cannibal was beaten to death by Christopher Scarver, a fellow inmate at the Columbia Correctional Institution in Portage, Wisconsin.
- Formed in 1996, the People Against Gangsterism and Drugs of Cape Town, South Africa fights drugs and gangs in their region. They have been linked to terrorism since they bombed some American targets in Cape Town.
- Formed in 1998, the Bakassi Boys of Nigeria were viewed as instrumental in decreasing the region's high crime.
- Los Pepes was a group formed in Colombia during the 1990s that committed acts of vigilantism against drug lord Pablo Escobar and his associates within the Medellín Cartel.
- After the September 11 attacks in 2001, Jonathan Idema, a self-proclaimed vigilante, entered Afghanistan and captured many people he claimed to be terrorists. Idema claimed he was collaborating with, and supported by, the United States Government. He sold news-media outlets tapes that he claimed showed an al-Qaeda training camp in action. His operations ended abruptly when he was arrested with his partners in 2004 and sentenced to 10 years in a notorious Afghan prison, before being pardoned in 2007.
- On November 24, 1963, Jack Ruby killed Lee Harvey Oswald. Oswald was arrested on November 22, roughly 75 minutes after he was suspected to have shot John F. Kennedy.
- On August 13, 2004, Akku Yadav was lynched by a mob of around 200 women from Kasturba Nagar, India. It took them 15 minutes to hack to death the man they say raped them with impunity for more than a decade. Chilli powder was thrown in his face and stones hurled. As he flailed and fought, one of his alleged victims hacked off his penis with a vegetable knife. A further 70 stab wounds were left on his body.
- Salwa Judum, the anti-Naxalite group formed in 2005 in India are suspected to be helping the security forces in their fight against Naxals.
- In Hampshire, England, during 2006, a vigilante slashed the tires of more than twenty cars, leaving a note made from cut-out newsprint stating "Warning: you have been seen while using your mobile phone". Driving whilst using a mobile is a criminal offense in the UK, but critics feel the law is little observed or enforced.
- The Gulabi Gang, formed in 2006 in Uttar Pradesh, is a female vigilante group dedicated to protecting women of all castes from domestic abuse, sexual violence, and oppression.
- Irish National Liberation Army (INLA), an Irish republican socialist paramilitary group, maintains a presence in parts of Northern Ireland and has carried out punishment beatings on local alleged petty criminals. In 2006, the INLA claimed to have put at least two drugs gangs out of business in Northern Ireland. After their raid on a criminal organization based in the north-west, they released a statement saying that "the Irish National Liberation Army will not allow the working-class people of this city to be used as cannon fodder by these criminals whose only concern is profit by whatever means available to them." On 15 February 2009, the INLA claimed responsibility for the shooting death of Derry drug-dealer Jim McConnell. On 19 August 2009, the INLA shot and wounded a man in Derry. The INLA claimed that the man was involved in drug dealing although the injured man and his family denied the allegation. In a newspaper article on 28 August, however, the victim retracted his previous statement and admitted that he had been involved in small scale drug-dealing but has since ceased these activities.
- Republican Action Against Drugs (RAAD) are an Irish Republican vigilante organization active predominantly in and around Derry. Although often attributed as being a front for "Dissident Republican" groups by the media, the organization claim to have no allegiance to any particular Republican party or paramilitary. Formed in late 2008, RAAD originally offered an "amnesty" to all drug dealers, asking them to make themselves known to the group before giving an assurance that they had stopped dealing. In an interview with the Derry Journal in August 2009, the group's leadership explained: "We would monitor the actions of those who have come forward and, given an adequate period of time, interest in those drug dealers would cease and they could start to lead normal lives". Since then, RAAD have claimed responsibility for no less than 17 shootings as well as countless pipe bomb attacks.
- Other Irish republican paramilitary organizations have served and continue to serve as vigilantes. Óglaigh na hÉireann for example in 2011 claimed responsibility for an arson attack on a taxi depot on Oldpark Road, Belfast, which led to the owners fleeing the country. It claimed that the owners were using the depot as a cover for drug dealing. In 2010 The Real Irish Republican Army shot a man in the legs in Derry. The man was a convicted sex offender. The Continuity Irish Republican Army in 2011 were blamed for the punishment beating of a heroin dealer in Clondalkin, Dublin. The man had previously been ordered to leave the country.
- On April 15, 2011, a group of women in Cherán armed with rocks and fireworks attacked a bus carrying illegal loggers armed with machine guns in Michoacán associated with the Mexican drug cartel La Familia Michoacana. They assumed control over the town, expelled the police force and blocked roads leading to oak timber on a nearby mountain. Vigilante activity spread to the nearby community of Opopeo. They established Community self-defence groups. The government of Mexico has recognized Cherán as a self-governing indigenous community, but criminals continue to murder residents in the forest.
- On June 13, 2014, Darius, a 16-year-old Romani residing in France and who has been several times interrogated by the police on the account of suspected burglaries and larcenies, was kidnapped, beaten up, and then left in a supermarket trolley by an unknown party after rumors circulated of him being implicated in a housebreaking, which happened several hours before in the city of Pierrefite-sur-Seine.
- Since the May 9, 2016 Philippine elections and the start of Rodrigo Duterte's term as the President of the Philippines, numerous suspects (particularly drug users and pushers) were killed by various unknown hitmen labelled as a summary execution during his war on drugs. Duterte has been accused of being linked to the Davao Death Squad, a vigilante group active since the mid-1990s in Davao City, where Duterte had previously served as mayor.
- Following the airing of To Catch a Predator, an internet trend arose in which one or multiple people trick pedophiles into meeting, under the impression that they were speaking with an underage person. The vigilantes then often hand the predators over to the police, or assault and/or blackmail the predators.

== See also ==
- Bounty hunter – Person who catches criminals or fugitives for a monetary reward
- Charivari – Folk custom shaming a community member
- Criminal justice – Justice to those who have committed crimes
- Citizen detective – Investigator in law enforcement
- Death squad – Armed group that conducts extrajudicial killings
- Extrajudicial punishment – Punishment carried out without legal processes or a trial
- Frankpledge – System of surety in medieval England, also an American form of frontier-vigilantism which emerged as a "mutation" of the Saxon tradition of frankpledge
- Frontier justice – Extrajudicial punishment
- Feud – Long-running argument or fight, a now-illegal form of non-governmental interpersonal violence which is currently practiced by feudal groups, organized criminals and gangs
- Internet vigilantism – Vigilante activities carried out through the Internet
- List of feuds in the United States – Prominent feuds in the US
- Law without the state
- Lynching – Extrajudicial killing by a group
- Lynching in the United States – Occurrence of extrajudicial killings
- Malfeasance – Types of failure to discharge public obligations under law
- Militia – Force of non-professional soldiers
- Mobbing – Bullying of an individual by a group
- Neighborhood watch – Organized group of neighbours dedicated to crime prevention
- Paramilitary punishment attacks in Northern Ireland
- Posse comitatus – Aspect of common law, an indirect descendant of the Northern Germanic hird or fyrd system, the "citizen enforcer" band is either capable of acting lawfully as an exceptional agent of justice; or it is in danger of deteriorating into lawlessness which is motivated by populist malice
- Presumption of guilt – Presumption that a person is guilty of a crime
- Public humiliation – Form of punishment whose main feature is dishonoring or disgracing a person
- Real-life superhero – Person dressing up in a superhero costume, groups of vigilantes who wear comic book style costumes
- Scam baiting – Internet vigilantism tactic, a form of vigilantism against scams
- Shaqawat Baghdad – Iraqi outlaws historically active in Baghdad
- Tarring and feathering – Form of public torture and humiliation
- Vigilante film – Film genre based on revenge theme
- Vigilantism in the United States of America
- Violent non-state actor – Groups independent of governments which use violence
- Whistleblower – Exposing of scandalous activity
- Whitecapping – Vigilante violence against minorities in the 1800s US
