= Vengeance =

Vengeance may refer to:

- Revenge, a harmful action against a person or group in response to a grievance

== Military ==
- French ship Vengeance, several ships of the French Navy
- HMS Vengeance, eight vessels of the British Royal Navy
- Vengeance (letter of marque), an American ship captured by the Royal Navy in 1813 and renamed HMS Telegraph
- USS Vengeance, two ships of the United States Navy
- Vultee A-31 Vengeance, an American dive bomber of the Second World War
- General Atomics FQ-42 Vengeance, American Unmanned Combat Aerial Vehicle

== Arts, music, and entertainment ==
=== Literature ===
- Vengeance (novel), a 2002 novel by Scott Ciencin and Dan Jolley, based on the TV series Angel
- Vengeance (Jonas book), a 1984 book by George Jonas
- The Vengeance (A Tale of Two Cities), a character in the 1859 novel A Tale of Two Cities by Charles Dickens
- Vengeance (comics), a character in the Marvel Comics universe
- Vengeance (DC Comics), several characters in the DC Comics universe

=== Film ===
- Vengeance (1930 film), action adventure film directed by Archie Mayo
- Vengeance (1937 film) or What Price Vengeance?, Canadian film directed by Del Lord
- Vengeance (1958 film), Spanish drama directed by Juan Antonio Bardem
- Vengeance (1968 film), Spaghetti Western by Antonio Margheriti
- Vengeance (1970 film), kung fu film directed by Chang Cheh
- Vengeance (2009 film), French-Hong Kong film directed by Johnnie To
- Vengeance (2014 film), action film starring Danny Trejo
- Vengeance (2022 film), dark comedy film written, directed by, and starring B. J. Novak
- Vengeance (2026 film), Indian political drama film
- Vengeance: A Love Story, a 2017 American action thriller film
- The Vengeance Trilogy, series of three South Korean films directed by Park Chan-wook
- Vengeance, the working title of the 2022 film The Batman

=== Television ===
- "Vengeance" (CSI: Miami), an episode of CSI: Miami
- "Vengeance" (The Killing), an episode of The Killing
- "Vengeance" (Mortal Kombat: Konquest), an episode of Mortal Kombat: Konquest
- "Vengeance" (Queen of Swords), an episode of Queen of Swords
- "Vengeance" (Stargate Atlantis), an episode of Stargate Atlantis
- WWE Vengeance, an annual professional wrestling pay-per-view event produced by WWE
- Vengeance, series 3 of The Tunnel, 2017

=== Video games ===
- Tribes: Vengeance, a 2004 video game

=== Music ===
==== Performers ====
- Vengeance (band), a Dutch heavy metal band, or their eponymous debut album
- Vengeance Rising (previously Vengeance), an American Christian thrash metal band
- Zacky Vengeance (born 1981), American musician, member of Avenged Sevenfold

==== Albums ====
- Vengeance (Mystic Prophecy album), 2001
- Vengeance (New Model Army album), 1984
- Vengeance (Nonpoint album), 2007
- Vengeance (Twelve Foot Ninja album), 2021
- Vengeance (EP), by Young Wicked, 2016

==== Songs ====
- "Vengeance" (Carly Simon song), 1979
- "Vengeance" (Coldrain song), 2024
- "Vengeance" (Denzel Curry song), 2018
- "Vengeance", by Before the Dawn from 4:17 am
- "Vengeance", by Converge from No Heroes
- "Vengeance", by Denzel Curry from Ta13oo
- "Vengeance", by the Devil Wears Prada from Dead Throne
- "Vengeance", by For the Fallen Dreams from Changes
- "Vengeance", by the Protomen from The Protomen
- "Vengeance", by Trivium from The Crusade
- "Vengeance", by Woe, Is Me from Numbers
- "Vengeance", by Yngwie Malmsteen from Magnum Opus
- "Vengeance", by Zack Hemsey, used in several films or trailers
- "Vengeance (The Pact)", by Blue Öyster Cult from Fire of Unknown Origin
- "We Have Awakened (Vengeance)", by the Killing Tree from We Sing Sin

== See also ==
- Avenger (disambiguation)
- Reprisal, a limited and deliberate violation of international law to punish another sovereign state
- Reprisal (novel), a 1991 novel in The Adversary Cycle by F. Paul Wilson
- Retaliation (disambiguation)
- Retorsion, in international law, an act perpetrated by one nation upon another in retaliation for a similar act perpetrated by the other nation
- Retribution (disambiguation)
- Revenge (disambiguation)
