= Canino (surname) =

Canino is a surname. Notable people with the surname include:

- Angel Canino (born 2003), Filipina volleyball player
- Bonnie Canino (born 1962), American boxer
- Bruno Canino (born 1935), Italian composer
- Gaspare Canino (1900–1977), Italian artist
- Joseph Canino (born 1997), American politician
