= Beati =

Beati may refer to:

- Aap Beati, a 1976 Hindi film
- Beati, those who have undergone the process of beatification
- Beati Paoli, the name of a secretive sect thought to have existed in medieval Sicily
- Nicola Beati (born 1983), Italian football (soccer) player

== See also ==
- beati, Wiktionary definition
