= Retribution =

Retribution may refer to:

- Punishment
- Retributive justice, a theory of justice
  - Divine retribution, retributive justice in a religious context
- Revenge, a harmful action against a person or group in response to a grievance

== Film and television ==
=== Films ===
- Retribution (1921 film), an Australian silent film by Armand Lionello
- Retribution (1969 film), a Soviet drama film by Aleksandr Stolper
- Retribution (1987 film), an American horror film by Guy Magar
- Retribution (2000 film) or Complicity, a UK film based on a novel by Iain Banks
- Retribution (2001 film), a British television film in the Hornblower series
- Retribution (2006 film), a Japanese horror film by Kiyoshi Kurosawa
- Retribution (2015 film), a Spanish thriller film by Dani de la Torre
- Retribution (2023 film), an American thriller film by Nimród Antal
- Resident Evil: Retribution, a 2012 film, the fifth in the Resident Evil series

=== Television ===
- Retribution (TV series), or One of Us, a 2016 British drama miniseries
- "Retribution" (Captain Power and the Soldiers of the Future), a 1988 two-part episode
- "Retribution" (Juliet Bravo), a 1983 episode
- "Retribution", a 1994 episode of BattleTech: The Animated Series

== Literature ==
- Retribution (Hoffman novel), a 2004 novel by Jilliane Hoffman
- Retribution (play), an 1818 play by John Dillon
- Retribution (Southworth novel), an 1849 novel by E. D. E. N. Southworth
- "Retribution", an 1846 poem by Henry Wadsworth Longfellow; see Mills of God
- Retribution, a 2007 novel in the Warhammer Von Carstein trilogy by Steven Savile
- Retribution, a 2007 Dreamland novel by Jim DeFelice and Dale Brown
- Mass Effect: Retribution, a 2010 novel by Drew Karpyshyn
- Retribution: Donald Trump and the Campaign That Changed America, a 2025 book by Jonathan Karl

== Music ==
=== Albums ===
- Retribution (Malevolent Creation album), 1992
- Retribution (Nightingale album), 2014
- Retribution (Obscura album), 2006
- Retribution (Shadows Fall album), 2009
- Retribution (Tanya Tagaq album) or the title song, 2016
- Retribution, by Ektomorf, 2014

=== Songs ===
- "Retribution", by Fantom Warior, 2012
- "Retribution", by Thunder from Bang!, 2008

== Video games ==
- Retribution (video game), a 1994 first-person shooter computer game
- Eve Online: Retribution, a 2012 expansion of the MMO Eve Online
- Resistance: Retribution, a PSP game in the Resistance series
- StarCraft: Retribution, a 1998 authorised add-on for the game StarCraft
- Warhammer 40,000: Dawn of War II – Retribution, a 2011 stand-alone expansion pack for the game Warhammer 40,000: Dawn of War II

== Other uses ==
- Retribution (professional wrestling), a professional wrestling stable

== See also ==
- Avenger (disambiguation)
- Reprisal, in warfare, a permissible act of retaliation
- Reprisal (novel), a novel in The Adversary Cycle by F. Paul Wilson
- Retaliation (disambiguation)
- Retorsion, in international law, an act of retaliation by one nation upon another
- Revenge (disambiguation)
- Vengeance (disambiguation)
