= Retaliation (disambiguation) =

In the sense of revenge, retaliation is a harmful action against a person or group in response to a grievance.

Retaliation or Retaliate may also refer to:

== Music ==
- Retaliation (band), a German death metal band formed in 2005
- Retaliate (Angerfist album) or the title song, 2011
- Retaliate (Misery Index album) or the title song, 2003
- Retaliation (Carnivore album), 1987
- Retaliation (Keak da Sneak album), 2002
- "Retaliation" (song), by Jedi Mind Tricks, 2001
- Retaliation (Dane Cook album), a 2005 comedy album/DVD

== Other uses ==
- Retaliation (film), a 1968 Japanese film

== See also ==
- Avenger (disambiguation)
- Eye for an eye, in the Hebrew Bible
- Reprisal, in warfare, a permissible act of retaliation
- Reprisal (novel), a novel in The Adversary Cycle by F. Paul Wilson
- Retorsion, in international law, an act of retaliation by one nation upon another
- Retribution (disambiguation)
- Revenge (disambiguation)
- Vengeance (disambiguation)
