= Venganza =

Venganza, Spanish for "vengeance", may refer to:

- Venganza (album), a 2005 album by Mexican death metal band Hacavitz
- ¡Venganza!, a 2009 album by rock band My Chemical Romance
- Venganza (TV series), Colombia (2017)
- "Venganza" (song), by No Te Va Gustar (2021)

== See also ==
- La venganza (disambiguation)
- Vengeance (disambiguation)
