= Extrajudicial punishment =

Punishment carried out without legal processes or a trial

Extrajudicial punishment is a punishment for an alleged crime or offense which is carried out without legal process or supervision by a court or tribunal through a legal proceeding.

== Politically motivated ==
Extrajudicial punishment is often a feature of politically repressive regimes, but even self-proclaimed or internationally recognized democracies have been known to use extrajudicial punishment under certain circumstances.

Although the legal use of capital punishment is generally decreasing around the world, individuals or groups deemed threatening—or even simply "undesirable"—to a government may nevertheless be targeted for punishment by a regime or its representatives. Such actions typically happen quickly, with security forces acting on a covert basis, performed in such a way as to avoid a massive public outcry and/or international criticism that would reflect badly on the state. Sometimes, the killers are agents outside the government. Criminal organizations, such as La Cosa Nostra, have reportedly been employed for such a purpose.

Another possibility is for uniformed security forces to punish a victim, but under circumstances that make it appear as self-defense or suicide. The former can be accomplished by planting recently fired weapons near the body, the latter by fabricating evidence suggesting suicide. In such cases, it can be difficult to prove that the perpetrators acted wrongly. Because of the dangers inherent in armed confrontation, even police or soldiers who might strongly prefer to take an enemy alive may still kill to protect themselves or civilians, and potentially cross the line into extrajudicial murder.

A forced disappearance (or enforced disappearance) occurs when a person is secretly abducted or imprisoned by a state or political organization or by a third party with the authorization, support, or acquiescence of a state or political organization, followed by a refusal to acknowledge the person's fate and whereabouts, with the intent of placing the victim outside the protection of the law.

Extrajudicial punishment may be planned and carried out by a particular branch of a state, without informing other branches, or even without having been ordered to commit such acts. Other branches sometimes tacitly approve of the punishment after the fact. They can also genuinely disagree with it, depending on the circumstances, especially when complex intragovernmental or internal policy struggles also exist within a state's policymaking apparatus.

In times of war, natural disaster, societal collapse, or in the absence of an established system of criminal justice, there may be increased incidences of extrajudicial punishment. In such circumstances, police or military personnel may be unofficially authorised to severely punish individuals involved in looting, rioting and other violent acts, especially if caught in flagrante delicto. This position is sometimes itself corrupted, resulting in the death of merely inconvenient persons, that is, relative innocents who are just in the wrong place at the wrong time.

== Around the world ==
=== Historically ===
Wyatt Earp led a federal posse, in the Earp Vendetta Ride, during the spring of 1882 which was implicated in the murder of four outlaw "Cowboys" they believed had ambushed his brothers Virgil and Morgan Earp, maiming the former and killing the latter.

The NKVD troika and Special Council of the NKVD are examples from the history of the Soviet Union, where extrajudicial punishment "by administrative means" was part of the state policy. Other Soviet Bloc secret police organizations like the East German Stasi, Romanian Securitate have also used it from time to time.

Most Latin American dictatorships have regularly instituted extrajudicial killings of their enemies; for one of the better-known examples, see Operation Condor.

The deaths of the leaders of the leftist urban guerrilla group, the Red Army Faction, Ulrike Meinhof, Andreas Baader, Gudrun Ensslin and Jan-Carl Raspe in West Germany are regarded by some of those in the radical left movements as extrajudicial killings, a theory partly based on the testimony of Irmgard Möller.

During the apartheid years (from 1948 until the early 1990s), South Africa's security forces routinely used extrajudicial means, including death squads, to deal with their political opponents. After his release, Nelson Mandela would refer to these acts as proof of a Third Force. This was denied vehemently by the administration of F.W. de Klerk. Later the South African Truth and Reconciliation Commission, led by Archbishop Desmond Tutu would find that both military and police agencies such as the Civil Cooperation Bureau and C10 based at Vlakplaas were guilty of gross human rights violations.

Independent of the TRC's findings, the international community had long condemned the regime; the United Nations had previously adopted the International Convention on the Suppression and Punishment of the Crime of Apartheid in 1973, and the Rome Statute later established apartheid as a crime against humanity under the jurisdiction of the International Criminal Court.

=== Present day ===
From 1957 to 2013, a system of administrative detention in China known as "re-education through labor" (láodòng jiàoyǎng 劳动教养, abbreviated láojiào 劳教) was used to detain persons for minor crimes such as petty theft, prostitution, and trafficking illegal drugs for periods of up to four years. Re-education through labor sentences were given by the police, rather than through the judicial system.

In the Netherlands, prosecutors and tax inspectors can procure punishments without due process (Strafbeschikking), a practice that has been increasingly criticised by members of the Dutch Second Chamber, such as Michiel van Nispen.

For many years, the Jamaican Constabulary Force has been noted for its extrajudicial killings. With 140 police killings in a population of 3 million, "Jamaica’s police force [is] among the deadliest in the world".

It has been discussed that the use of psychiatric treatments to reduce unwanted behaviors can be seen as extrajudicial punishments, due to many side-effects associated to these treatments.

The US has been known to employ extrajudicial tactics including extraordinary rendition. Some critics use the term "torture by proxy" to describe situations in which the CIA and other US agencies have employed rendition techniques to transfer suspected terrorists to countries known to utilize torture. While denied by the US, where it is a crime to transfer anyone to any location for the purpose of torture, critics claim that torture has been employed with the knowledge or acquiescence of US agencies. Condoleezza Rice (then the United States Secretary of State) stated:

...the United States has not transported anyone, and will not transport anyone, to a country when we believe he will be tortured. Where appropriate, the United States seeks assurances that transferred persons will not be tortured.

The CIA has operated secret detention and interrogation centers officially known as black sites. These were located in countries outside the US, thus evading US domestic laws and legal oversight as they operated outside US jurisdiction.

On September 4, 2025, the U.S. Navy killed 11 people in a boat in international waters. President Donald Trump claimed that they were smuggling drugs.

=== Human rights groups ===
Many human rights organisations like Amnesty International campaign against extrajudicial punishment.

== See also ==
- Administrative detention
- Arbitrary arrest and detention
- Assassination
- Charivari
- COINTELPRO
- Death squad
- Extrajudicial prisoners of the United States
- Extrajudicial killing
- Extraordinary rendition
- Frontier justice
- Human rights
- Human Rights Watch
- Law without the state
- Lynching
- Martial law
- Non-judicial punishment
- Outlaw
- Police encounter
- Posse
- Presumption of guilt
- Prison rape
- Purge
- State of emergency
- Summary execution
- Targeted killing
- Tarring and feathering
- Terrorism
- Torture
- Vigilante
- Vigilantism in the United States of America
- Whitecapping

== Sources ==
- Miethe, Terance D.; Lu, Hong (2005). Punishment: A Comparative Historical Perspective. Cambridge University Press. ISBN 978-0-521-60516-8.
- Adam Possamai; James T Richardson; Bryan S Turner (4 December 2014). The Sociology of Shari'a: Case Studies from around the World. Springer. pp. 40–41. ISBN 978-3-319-09605-6.
- Collective Punishment. Human Rights Watch. GGKEY:9K4181KYTQU.
