= Revenge (disambiguation) =

Revenge is a harmful action against a person or group in response to a grievance.

Revenge or The Revenge may also refer to:

== Ships ==
- HMS Revenge, disambiguation page for multiple ships of this name
- USS Revenge, disambiguation page for multiple ships of this name
- Revenge, the ship owned by the English pirate Stede Bonnet (1688–1718)

== Books ==
- Revenge!, an 1896 short story collection by Robert Barr
- Revenge, a 1971 novel by Louis Masterson; the eleventh installment in the Morgan Kane series
- Revenge, a 1995 novel by Diane Hoh; the 26th installment in the Nightmare Hall series
- Revenge!, a 1996 novel by John Kerrigan
- Revenge, a 1998 novel by Jackie Collins; the fourth installment in the Madison Castelli series
- The Revenge, or Revenge of Mimi Quinn, a 1998 novel by Shirley Conran
- Revenge: Eleven Dark Tales, a 1998 short story collection by Yōko Ogawa
- Revenge (novel), or The Stars' Tennis Balls, a 2000 novel by Stephen Fry
- Revenge, a 2001 novel by Maureen O'Brien
- Revenge, a 2002 novel by Fiona McIntosh; the second installment in the Trinity trilogy
- Revenge, a 2004 novel by Mary Morris
- Revenge, a 2007 novel by Eric Brown
- Jimmy Coates: Revenge, a 2007 novel by Joe Craig; the third installment in the Jimmy Coates series
- Revenge, a 2008 novel by Doranna Durgin; the first novel based on the TV series Ghost Whisperer
- Revenge, a 2013 crime novel by Martina Cole
- Revenge (book), a 2022 book by Tom Bower

== Film and TV ==
=== Film ===
- Revenge (1918 film), American western by Tod Browning
- Revenge (1928 film), an American silent drama film
- Revenge (1948 film), a Mexican crime film
- Revenge (1962 film) or Wonhanui Irwoldo, South Korean film featuring Park Am
- Revenge (1968 film) or Boksu, South Korean film featuring Park No-sik
- Revenge (1969 film), Italian film of 1969
- Revenge (1971 film), British thriller by Sidney Hayers
- Revenge (1978 film), Romanian Film
- Blood Feud (1978 film), also known as Revenge, Italian thriller by Lina Wertmüller
- Revenge (1989 film) (Russian: Mest), Soviet film by Yermek Shinarbayev also known as The Red Flute
- Revenge (1985 film), Indian Malayalam-language film
- Revenge (1990 film), American crime thriller starring Kevin Costner
- The Revenge (film), 2002 Polish film by Andrzej Wajda
- Revenge: A Love Story, 2010 Hong Kong film by Wong Ching-Po
- Hevn (Revenge), 2015 Norwegian-Canadian film by Kjersti Steinsbø
- Revenge (2017 film), a French rape and revenge action-thriller film by Coralie Fargeat
- Dhurandhar: The Revenge, a 2026 Indian spy action thriller film by Aditya Dhar, final part of the Dhurandhar duology
  - "Revenge", a chapter with the 2026 film

=== Television ===
- Revenge (TV series), a 2011–15 American drama program
- The Revenge (TV series), a 2021 Thai program featuring Chanon Santinatornkul
- SuperBrawl Revenge, a 2001 professional wrestling pay-per-view event

==== Episodes ====
- "Revenge" (Alfred Hitchcock Presents), 1955
- "Revenge" (Band of Gold), 1995
- "Revenge" (NCIS), 2013
- "Revenge" (Star Wars: The Clone Wars), 2012
- "Revenge" (Survivors), 1975
- "Revenge" (Suspects), 2015
- "The Revenge" (Seinfeld), 1991

== Music ==
- Revenge (Canadian band), a black metal band
- Revenge (British band), a band led by New Order bassist Peter Hook

=== Albums ===
- Revenge! (Charles Mingus album) (recorded 1964, released 1996)
- Revenge (Bill Cosby album), a 1967 comedy album
- Revenge (Eurythmics album) (1986)
- Revenge (T.S.O.L. album) (1986)
- Revenge (Kiss album) (1992)
- Revenge (Janis Ian album) (1995)
- Revenge (The Flying Luttenbachers album) (1996)
- Revenge (Cro-Mags album) (2000)
- Revenge (Paragon album) (2005)
- Revenge (Iron Fire album) (2006)
- Revenge (mixtape), a 2017 mixtape by XXXTentacion
- Revenge (Muni Long album), 2024
- The Revenge (album), a 2007 album by Jorn Lande and Russell Allen
- Revenge, a 2011 album by Bobby Creekwater
- Revenge, a 2005 album by Vitalij Kuprij
- Three Cheers for Sweet Revenge, also known as Revenge, a 2004 album by My Chemical Romance

=== Songs ===
- "Revenge" (CaptainSparklez song), a parody of Usher's "DJ Got Us Fallin' in Love", 2011
- "Revenge" (Joyner Lucas song), 2020
- "Revenge" (Pink song), 2017
- "Revenge" (XXXTentacion song), 2017
- "Revenge", by Black Flag from Jealous Again
- "Revenge", by Brook Benton
- "Revenge", by Chevelle from Hats Off to the Bull
- "Revenge", by Dynasty from The Second Adventure, 1981
- "Revenge", by Eurythmics from In the Garden
- "Revenge", by (G)I-dle from 2
- "Revenge", by Meovv from Bite Now
- "Revenge", by Mindless Self Indulgence from Alienating Our Audience
- "Revenge", by Ministry from With Sympathy
- "Revenge", by Papa Roach from Infest
- "Revenge", by Patti Smith Group from Wave
- "Revenge", by Plain White T's from All That We Needed
- "Revenge", by Switchfoot from Oh! Gravity.
- "Revenge", by White Zombie from Let Sleeping Corpses Lie

== Theatre ==
- The Revenge (Behn play), a 1680 play by Aphra Behn
- The Revenge (Fredro play), an 1834 comedy play by Polish writer Aleksander Fredro
- The Revenge (Young play), a 1721 play by Edward Young
- The Revenge, a 1978 UK radio play by Andrew Sachs

== Other ==
- Revenge: The Rematches, a 1994 boxing card in Las Vegas, Nevada
- Burnout Revenge, a 2005 racing video game in the Burnout series
- "The Revenge. A Ballad of the Fleet", a poem by Alfred, Lord Tennyson about the English ship Revenge (1577)

== See also ==
- Avenger (disambiguation)
- Reprisal
- Retaliation (disambiguation)
- Retorsion
- Retribution (disambiguation)
- Vengeance (disambiguation)
