= Administrative process =

Soviet Union expression

By administrative means (в административном порядке, "v administrativnom poryadke") was a term used in the Soviet Union when some actions which would normally require a court decision were left to the decision of executive bodies (administration), i.e. a form of extrajudicial punishment.

In modern Russia there are concepts of ru:административное правонарушение, administrative process, and ru:административная ответственность - all governed by the Code of the Russian Federation on Administrative Offenses: administrative offense is "an unlawful, guilty action (inaction) of an individual or legal entity for which this Code or the laws of the constituent entities of the Russian Federation on administrative offenses establishes administrative liability", and "by administrative means" refers to the application of the administrative process.

Concepts similar to "administrative process" exist in other countries: de:Verwaltungsverfahren in Germany, pl:Postępowanie administracyjne in Poland, etc.

== See also ==
- Special Council of the NKVD
- NKVD Troika
- Population transfer in the Soviet Union
- 101st kilometre
- Administrative arrest (Russia)
- Administrative complaint
- Administrative organ, an organization with rights to carry out administrative activities
- Code of the Russian Federation on the Administrative Procedure
