= USS Avenge =

Three ships of the United States Navy have borne the name Avenge.

- USS Avenge (AMc-65), was renamed Assertive on 23 May 1941.
- USS Avenge (AMc-66), was an Accentor-class minesweeper, launched in 1942 and struck in 1946.
- USS Avenge (AM-423), was an Aggressive-class minesweeper, launched in 1953 and struck in 1970.

== See also ==
- USS Avenger
- HMS Avenger
