= La venganza =

La venganza, Spanish for "the vengeance", may refer to:

- La venganza (1977 TV series), a 1977 Spanish-language telenovela broadcast in Mexico
- La venganza (2002 TV series), a 2002 Spanish-language telenovela initially broadcast in the U.S.
- La venganza (film), a 1958 film directed by Juan Antonio Bardem
- La venganza (1999 film), an Argentine film

== See also ==
- Venganza (disambiguation)
