= Avenged =

Avenged may refer to:

- Avenged (1910 film), a 1910 silent film
- Avenged (2013 South African film), a 2013 South African film
- Avenged (2013 American film), a 2013 American film

== See also ==
- Avenge (disambiguation)
- Avenger (disambiguation)
