= Special Council of the NKVD =

Within the administration of the Soviet Union, the Special Council of the USSR NKVD (Russian: Особое совещание при НКВД СССР (ОСО), romanized: Osoboe soveshchanie pri NKVD SSSR, (OSO)) was created by the same decree of Sovnarkom of July 10, 1934 that introduced the NKVD itself. The decree endowed the Special Council with the right to apply punishments "by administrative means", i.e., without trial. In other words, the term "by administrative means" actually refers to extrajudicial punishment.

The following types of punishment were put at the disposal of the Special Council by this decree: banishment (высылка) (from the place of residence), exile (ссылка) (to remote regions), sentencing to corrective labor camp (исправительно-трудовой лагерь) for up to five years, and deportation (высылка) from the USSR.

In 1937, during the Great Purge, the Special Council was allowed to sentence to imprisonment for up to eight years. The abolition of many NKVD troikas in November 1938 saw the Special Council take over some of their functions. In November 1941, after the beginning of the war against Germany, the Special Council was allowed to sentence to imprisonment for up to 25 years or to death. After the 1945 end of the war the Special Council lost the right to pass death-sentences; the maximum available punishment was 25 years of imprisonment.

When the NKVD was renamed in 1946, the Special Council remained within the corresponding organization, e.g., as Special Council of the MGB, etc.

After the death of Joseph Stalin in March 1953, the Presidium of the Supreme Soviet of the Soviet Union abolished the Special Council in September 1953.

== See also ==
- NKVD troika
