= Vendicatori =

Foundation

The Vendicatori ('Avengers'), were a secret society of rebel-vigilantes formed about 1186 in Sicily to avenge popular wrongs. The society was finally suppressed by William II of Sicily (1155–1189), who hanged the grand master and branded the members with hot irons.

The vindicosi, or vindicators, are described as a historical sect by Francesco Maria Emanuele Gaetani (1720–1802) in his Diari palermitani (Palermo diaries). According to this author, they may date back to 1185.

== See also ==
- Beati Paoli
