= The New Avengers (disambiguation) =

The New Avengers are a fictional team of Marvel Comics superheroes.

The New Avengers may also refer to:

- The New Avengers (TV series), a 1976–1977 UK television series
- Thunderbolts*, a 2025 film also marketed as The New Avengers
- New Avengers (Marvel Cinematic Universe), a superhero team in the Marvel Cinematic Universe

== See also ==
- Avengers (disambiguation)
