= Gaspare Canino =

Italian artist and puppetmaster

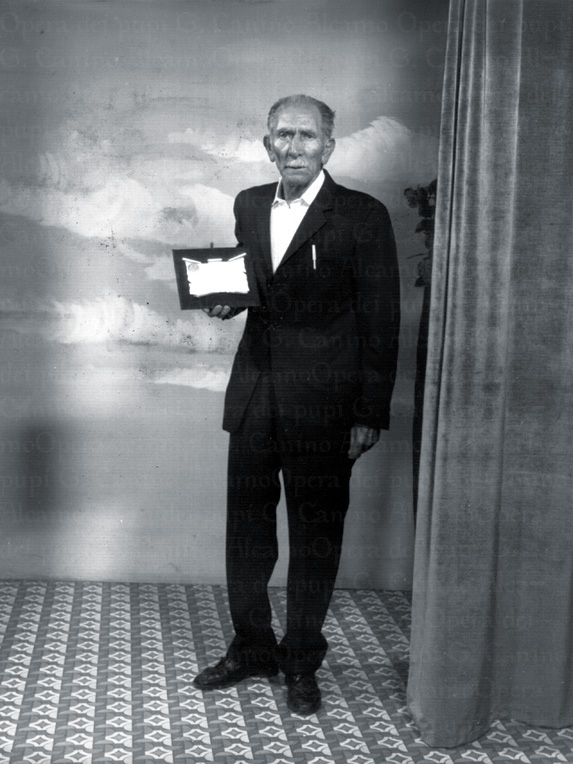
- Born: 28 May 1900; Partinico, (Palermo), Italy
- Died: 1977 (aged 76–77); Alcamo
- Occupations: Puppetmaster, Puppet Designer and Scene painter

Gaspare Canino (Partinico, 28 May 1900 – Alcamo, 1977) was an Italian artist and one of the last puppetmasters of the Canino family, working in Alcamo in the province of Trapani; his activity, interrupted in 1970, has been resumed in 1990 by Salvatore Oliveri, his grandson.

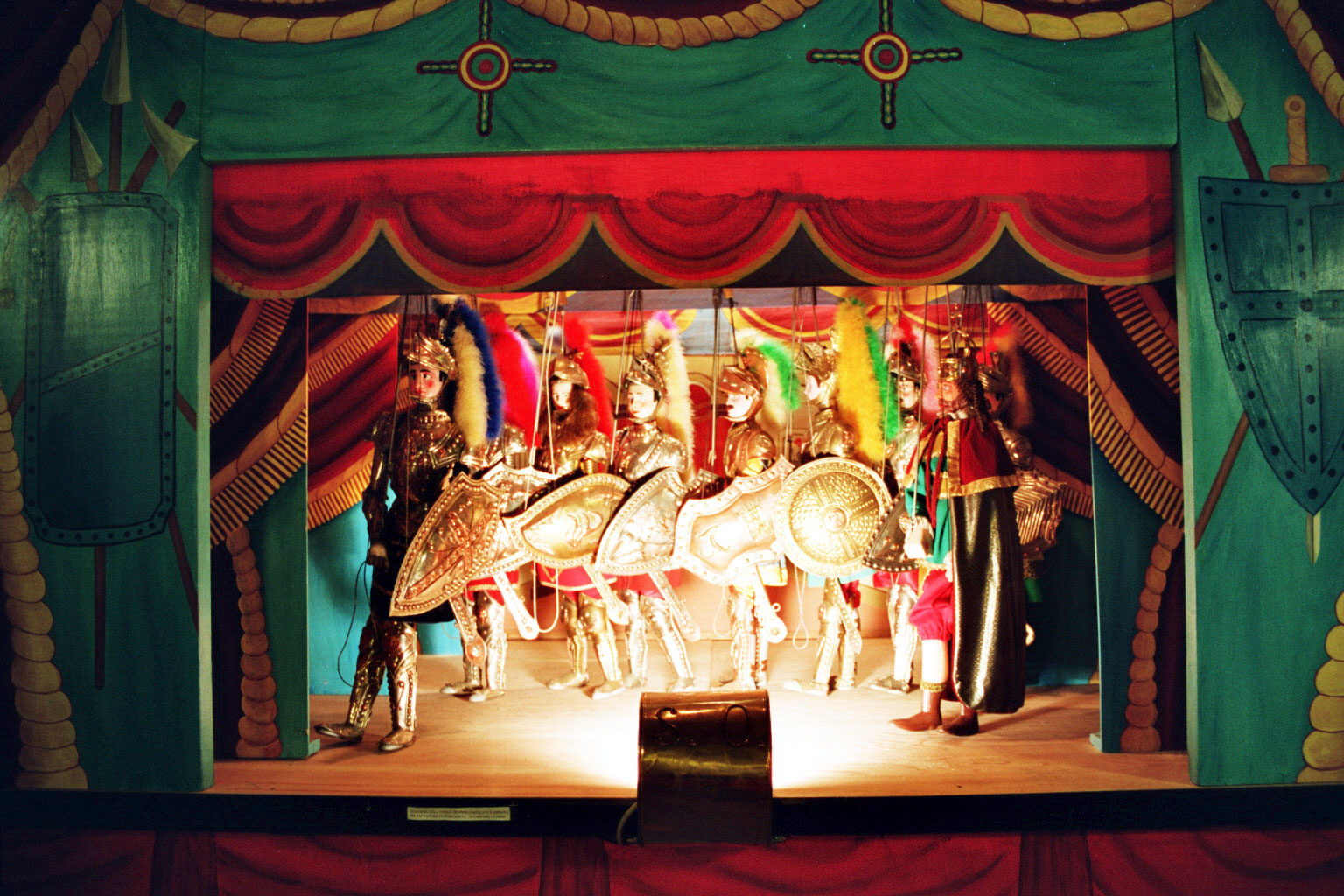
The theatre of puppets in Alcamo

== Biography ==
Gaspare Canino was born in Partinico, in the province of Palermo, on 28 May 1900. The Canino family came from Trapani and in 1700 moved to Palermo, where Alberto (don Liberto Canino), who later became a puppetmaster, was born; at first he made cylinder pianos.

Don Liberto had two sons that inherited their father's art: Antonio e Luigi. Antonio settled in Partinico and Luigi in Alcamo. The latter married Maria Concetta La Rocca and had five children: Alberto, Giuseppe, Gaspare, Guglielmo and Rosetta. In 1913 Don Luigi expatriated alone to Argentina in search of his fortune, leaving the family; his son, Gaspare, after a quarrel with his uncle, whom he lived with, started to wander through Sicily, until he settled in the small theatre-laboratory of his father, who came back home after four years and resumed his activity of puppetmaster.

Gaspare and Guglielmo continued the work they had learnt: Guglielmo settled in Sciacca, while Gaspare remained with his father in Alcamo. Gaspare got married with Antonia Fundarò, and had three daughters: Maria Concetta, Melchiorra e Rosetta.

As Don Luigi could not run the activity any longer, because it implied also a continuous work of maintenance, it was up to Gaspare to get the old little theatre of via Manzoni in order, and represent the enterprises of Charlemagne and his paladins, Guido Santo, Jerusalem Delivered, Trabazio emperor of Constantinople, Saint Genevieve, Beati Paoli, the brigand Giuseppe Musolino and the Battle of Roncevaux Pass. Besides there were some farces with comic popular characters like "Virticchiu and Nofrio".

In the 1960s cinema and television attracted young people, so fewer people went to see the Opera dei Pupi. One day, dottor Antonio Pasqualino, who was passionate about Sicilian puppets, decided to buy all that the puppet masters wanted to sell, and created the Museo internazionale delle marionette (International Museum of Puppets) in Palermo; Gaspare sold everything too: his puppets, backclothes, playbills and wings.

On the initiative of Regione Siciliana, don Gaspare Canino was given a silver plaque as Cavaliere of Sicilian Folklore, at the museum Giuseppe Pitrè, and on the same occasion he donated an old puppet made by his grandfather Liberto to the foundation.

He died in Alcamo in 1977; since 1990 his work has been continued by his niece, Salvatore Oliveri, who builds puppets, has a puppet theatre inside the Castle of the Counts of Modica in Alcamo and gives public shows.

== Works ==
Gaspare Canino sculpted and created his puppets, painted backclothes and playbills, and also carts even if his father was not so clever as him, people from Alcamo have always known them as "Don Luigi's puppets ".

Among the characters he realized, there are the puppets of Charlemagne, Roland, Renaud de Montauban, Angelica, Astolfo, Ganelon and the fairy Alcina.

The most part of the puppets in the house-museum Antonino Uccello, at Palazzolo Acreide (in the province of Syracuse), come from the collection of don Gaspare Canino: besides them, there are a lot of handwritten scripts and a letter containing his autobiography.

Don Gaspare tells:

... io sono nato 28 Maggio 1900, nato a Partinico provincia di Palermo la mia nascita è un romanzo perché mio padre Luigi Canino era in viaggio da Palermo in Alcamo e non-potendo più andare avanti causa di mia Madre dovette fermarsi a Partinico e diede me in luce sù il palcoscenico da mio zio Antonino Canino fratello di mio padre che ne stava con il teatrino a Partinico la cuale io faccio il mestiere 9 mesi prima di nascere poi sono di vera origine di colui che e sperimentato i pupi Siciliani il signor Canino Alberto fu mio nonno che nel 1830 creo i pupi snodabili e più umani... .

(I was born 28th May, born in Partinico province of Palermo my birth is a novel because my father Luigi Canino was travelling from Palermo in Alcamo and as he could not go further cause of my Mother he had to stop at Partinico and gave birth to me on the stage of my uncle Antonino Canino brother of my father who stayed at Partinico with his small theatre who I do the job 9-month before I was born then I really come from the man has experimented Sicilian puppets signor Canino Alberto was my grandfather who in 1830 created articulated puppets and more human....)

There are also a hundred of playbills, that is the advertisements put near the small theatre, and that publicized the evening show of the Opera dei Pupi: a lot of them represent a scene with various characters.

In the collections there are also the playbills of the Palermo type, realized by Canino: in comparison with those of the Catania type, they are bigger, arranged in the vertical direction, tempera painted and with various frames; they describe the most important scenes of the story, and are similar to those of cantastorias.

== See also ==
- Opera dei Pupi
- Paladins

== Sources ==
- Canino Gaspare:Ricordi sulla storia del teatro dei pupi in Sicilia; Alcamo, tip.Campo, 1966.
- Sul filo del racconto. Gaspare Canino e Natale Meli nelle collezioni del Museo internazionale delle marionette Antonio Pasqualino. Con CD Audio di S. G. Giuliano, O. Sorgi, J. Vibaek (a cura di); Palermo, CRICD, 2011
- Valentina Venturini (a cura di): Dal Cunto all’Opera dei pupi. Il teatro di Cuticchio; Roma, Dino Audino editore, 2003
- Guido di Palma: I cartelloni dell' opera dei pupi di area palermitana; 2011
- Carlo Cataldo: I suoni sommersi Musica danza e teatro ad Alcamo p. 144-146; ed.Campo, Alcamo, 1997
- Antonio Pasqualino: L'opera dei Pupi; Sellerio, Palermo, 1977
- "Nato sotto il segno dei Pupi". Archived from the original on 20 December 2016.
- "Opera dei Pupu Gaspare Canino".
- "Opera dei Pupi G.Canino Trapani".
- "Cartellone dell'opera dei pupi Palermitani".
- "Dall'orecchio all'occhio, la tecnica pittorica dei cartelloni".
