= USS Avenger =

Three ships of the United States Navy have borne the name Avenger.

- USS Avenger (1863), was a side-wheel ram, transferred from the Army to the Navy in 1863, and decommissioned and sold in 1865.
- USS Avenger (SP-2646), was leased and commissioned by the Navy in May 1918, and decommissioned in December 1918.
- USS Avenger (MCM-1), is an Avenger-class mine countermeasures ship, launched in 1985 and decommissioned on 30 September 2014.

== Fictional ships ==
- The 1979 novel, Inoculate!, features a fictional submarine named USS Avenger

== See also ==
- USS Avenge
- HMS Avenger
