= List of Dixon of Dock Green episodes =

This is a list of Dixon of Dock Green television episodes from the series that ran from 1955 until 1976. It had twenty-two series of original episodes. Series one to fifteen aired in black and white, series sixteen to twenty-two were aired in colour. A total of 432 episodes were produced; 399 are missing.

== Series overview ==
Series	Episodes	Premiered:	Ended:
1	6	9 July 1955	13 August 1955
2	13	9 June 1956	1 September 1956
3	12	12 January 1957	30 March 1957
4	29	7 September 1957	29 March 1958
5	27	27 September 1958	28 March 1959
6	30	12 September 1959	2 April 1960
7	30	1 October 1960	22 April 1961
8	26	9 September 1961	3 March 1962
9	28	15 September 1962	23 March 1963
10	26	5 October 1963	28 March 1964
11	26	19 September 1964	13 March 1965
12	31	2 October 1965	30 April 1966
13	13	1 October 1966	24 December 1966
14	20	30 September 1967	10 February 1968
15	16	7 September 1968	21 December 1968
16	17	6 September 1969	27 December 1969
17	17	14 November 1970	6 March 1971
18	13	20 November 1971	12 February 1972
19	14	23 September 1972	30 December 1972
20	17	29 December 1973	20 April 1974
21	13	15 February 1975	10 May 1975
22	8	13 March 1976	1 May 1976

== Episodes ==
=== Series 1 (1955) ===
№ overall	№ in Series	Airdate	Title	Status
1	1	9 July 1955	PC Crawford's First Pinch	Missing
2	2	16 July 1955	Needle in a Haystack	Missing
3	3	23 July 1955	Night Beat	Missing
4	4	30 July 1955	The Dock Green Desperado	Missing
5	5	6 August 1955	Dixie	Missing
6	6	13 August 1955	London Pride	Missing

=== Series 2 (1956) ===
№ overall	№ in Series	Airdate	Title	Status
7	1	9 June 1956	Ladies of the Manor	Missing
8	2	16 June 1956	The Hero	Missing
9	3	23 June 1956	Didey's Dollar	Missing
10	4	30 June 1956	The Little Gold Mine	Missing
11	5	7 July 1956	Eleven Plus	Missing
12	6	14 July 1956	The Gentle Scratcher	Missing
13	7	21 July 1956	Andy Steps Up	Missing
14	8	28 July 1956	On Mother Kelly's Doorstep	Missing
15	9	4 August 1956	Postman's Knock	Exists
16	10	11 August 1956	The Rotten Apple	Exists
17	11	18 August 1956	The Roaring Boy	Exists
18	12	25 August 1956	Pound of Flesh	Exists
19	13	1 September 1956	Father in Law	Exists

=== Series 3 (1957) ===
№ overall	№ in Series	Airdate	Title	Status
20	1	12 January 1957	Give a Dog a Good Name	Missing
21	2	19 January 1957	George and the Dragon	Missing
22	3	26 January 1957	No Place Like Home	Missing
23	4	2 February 1957	The Silent House	Missing
24	5	9 February 1957	The December Boy	Missing
25	6	16 February 1957	The Black Noah	Missing
26	7	23 February 1957	False Alarm	Missing
27	8	2 March 1957	The Canon's Gaiters	Missing
28	9	9 March 1957	Rock, Rattle and Roll	Missing
29	10	16 March 1957	The Name is MacNamara	Missing
30	11	23 March 1957	The Gentle Scratcher	Missing
31	12	30 March 1957	Silver Jubilee	Missing

=== Series 4 (1957–58) ===
№ overall	№ in Series	Airdate	Title	Status
32	1	7 September 1957	Presented in Court	Missing
33	2	14 September 1957	The Story of Jimmy Mayo	Missing
34	3	21 September 1957	Notice to Quit	Missing
35	4	28 September 1957	A Woman of Thirty-Eight	Missing
36	5	5 October 1957	The High Price of Radishes	Missing
37	6	12 October 1957	A Slight Case of Harm	Missing
38	7	19 October 1957	The Nelson Touch	Missing
39	8	26 October 1957	The Heel	Missing
40	9	2 November 1957	Fireworks	Missing
41	10	16 November 1957	Bosco and Bosco	Missing
42	11	23 November 1957	The New Skipper	Missing
43	12	30 November 1957	The Love of Phil	Missing
44	13	7 December 1957	The Crooked Key	Missing
45	14	14 December 1957	A Penn'orth of Allsorts	Missing
46	15	21 December 1957	Peace on Earth	Missing
47	16	28 December 1957	Goodwill to Men	Missing
48	17	4 January 1958	The Lady in Red	Missing
49	18	11 January 1958	Duffy's New Boots	Missing
50	19	18 January 1958	The Salvation of Duffy	Missing
51	20	25 January 1958	A Little Bit of French	Missing
52	21	1 February 1958	The Light over the Window	Missing
53	22	8 February 1958	All Buttoned Up	Missing
54	23	15 February 1958	They Don't Like Policemen	Missing
55	24	22 February 1958	The Stargazer	Missing
56	25	1 March 1958	Little Boy Blue	Missing
57	26	8 March 1958	The Case of Mrs X	Missing
58	27	15 March 1958	The Cats and the Fiddles	Missing
59	28	22 March 1958	All My Eye and Elbow	Missing
60	29	29 March 1958	The Key of the Nick	Missing

=== Series 5 (1958–59) ===
№ overall	№ in Series	Airdate	Title	Status
61	1	27 September 1958	George Takes Whisky	Missing
62	2	4 October 1958	Tom Brown's Lady	Missing
63	3	11 October 1958	A Whiff of Garlic	Missing
64	4	18 October 1958	Third Time Lucky	Missing
65	5	25 October 1958	Bracelets for the Groom	Missing
66	6	1 November 1958	The Gent from Siberia	Missing
67	7	8 November 1958	The Case of the Stolen Dustbin	Missing
68	8	15 November 1958	Strangers at the Same Table	Missing
69	9	22 November 1958	A Little Bit of Luck	Missing
70	10	29 November 1958	A Whisper on the Road	Missing
71	11	6 December 1958	The Pyromaniac	Missing
72	12	13 December 1958	Genuine Yule Logs	Missing
73	13	20 December 1958	The Old Christmas Spirit	Missing
74	14	27 December 1958	Flint Rides Again	Missing
75	15	3 January 1959	Ride on a Tiger	Missing
76	16	10 January 1959	The Half-Wide Mug	Missing
77	17	17 January 1959	The Magic Eye	Missing
78	18	24 January 1959	The Slinger	Missing
79	19	31 January 1959	Trouble on Eight Beat	Missing
80	20	7 February 1959	Blues in the Night	Missing
81	21	14 February 1959	The Woman from Kimberley	Missing
82	22	21 February 1959	A Case for The Inland Revenue	Missing
83	23	28 February 1959	One for the Milkman	Missing
84	24	7 March 1959	The Whizz Gang	Missing
85	25	14 March 1959	Over and Out	Missing
86	26	21 March 1959	Duffy Calls the Tune	Exists
87	27	28 March 1959	Helmet on the Sideboard	Missing

=== Series 6 (1959–60) ===
№ overall	№ in Series	Airdate	Title	Status
88	1	12 September 1959	The Bent Screw	Missing
89	2	19 September 1959	The Lodgers	Missing
90	3	26 September 1959	The Kid from Kirkintilloch	Missing
91	4	3 October 1959	A Little Bit of Science	Missing
92	5	10 October 1959	A Bomb Called Mary	Missing
93	6	17 October 1959	The Case for Patrick Mulligan	Missing
94	7	24 October 1959	An Hour After Midnight	Missing
95	8	31 October 1959	Shaking the Law	Missing
96	9	7 November 1959	George Drops the Book	Missing
97	10	14 November 1959	Beyond Control	Missing
98	11	21 November 1959	A Flask of Black Coffee	Missing
99	12	28 November 1959	A Question of Decibels	Missing
100	13	5 December 1959	A Toast For Sandy Brownrigg	Missing
101	14	12 December 1959	Send for Santa Claus	Missing
102	15	19 December 1959	Ma's Seven Bundles	Missing
103	16	26 December 1959	A Piece of Pink Ribbon	Missing
104	17	2 January 1960	The Knock Man	Missing
105	18	9 January 1960	A Very Peculiar Business	Missing
106	19	16 January 1960	The Guilty Party	Missing
107	20	23 January 1960	When Thieves Fall Out	Missing
108	21	30 January 1960	Twinkle, Twinkle Little Star	Missing
109	22	6 February 1960	A Lead from Mother Kelly	Missing
110	23	13 February 1960	The Slinger and the Slush	Missing
111	24	20 February 1960	The Threat	Missing
112	25	27 February 1960	Anglo-Saxon Joy	Missing
113	26	5 March 1960	No Place for Sentiment	Missing
114	27	12 March 1960	The Black and the White	Missing
115	28	19 March 1960	The Little School	Missing
116	29	26 March 1960	Mr Pettigrew's Bowler	Missing
117	30	2 April 1960	Everything Goes in Threes	Missing

=== Series 7 (1960–61) ===
№ overall	№ in Series	Airdate	Title	Status
118	1	1 October 1960	All Cats are Grey	Missing
119	2	8 October 1960	The Big Red Rug	Missing
120	3	15 October 1960	The Hot Seat	Exists
121	4	22 October 1960	The Vanishing Bummaree	Missing
122	5	29 October 1960	A Grain of Rice	Missing
123	6	5 November 1960	Jennie Wren	Missing
124	7	12 November 1960	Obsession	Missing
125	8	19 November 1960	A Fall from the Tightrope	Missing
126	9	26 November 1960	Duffy Takes a Walk	Missing
127	10	3 December 1960	Duffy Goes to War	Missing
128	11	10 December 1960	The Mystery of the Wandering Voice	Missing
129	12	17 December 1960	The Night of the Accident	Missing
130	13	24 December 1960	Christmas Eve at the Nick	Missing
131	14	31 December 1960	A Spot of Overtime	Missing
132	15	7 January 1961	T-E-A Spells Trouble	Missing
133	16	14 January 1961	The Burn-Up	Missing
134	17	21 January 1961	The Drummers	Missing
135	18	28 January 1961	The Red Herring	Missing
136	19	4 February 1961	The Traffic of a Night	Missing
137	20	11 February 1961	Laudie Takes the Strain	Missing
138	21	18 February 1961	River Beat	Fragments
139	22	25 February 1961	The Woman in the Case	Missing
140	23	4 March 1961	The Persistent Widow, Part 1	Missing
141	24	11 March 1961	The Persistent Widow, Part 2	Missing
142	25	18 March 1961	Want a Persian Rug, Lady?	Missing
143	26	25 March 1961	The Glass of Fury	Missing
144	27	1 April 1961	Storm in a Coffee Bar	Missing
145	28	8 April 1961	A Kiss for the Constable	Missing
146	29	15 April 1961	One Pound Note	Missing
147	30	22 April 1961	Mister Rainbow	Missing

=== Series 8 (1961–62) ===
№ overall	№ in Series	Airdate	Title	Status
148	1	9 September 1961	A Little Touch of Ginger	Missing
149	2	16 September 1961	The Tommy Fuller Story	Missing
150	3	23 September 1961	A Quiet, Ordinary Woman	Missing
151	4	30 September 1961	George Takes a Bowler	Missing
152	5	7 October 1961	The Loose Load	Missing
153	6	14 October 1961	The Biggest Thief in Town	Missing
154	7	21 October 1961	Desperation	Missing
155	8	28 October 1961	The Bent Twig	Missing
156	9	4 November 1961	The Case of the Silent Thief	Missing
157	10	11 November 1961	A Question of Temperament	Missing
158	11	18 November 1961	A Tip for the CID	Missing
159	12	25 November 1961	A Couple of Kids	Missing
160	13	2 December 1961	The Husband	Missing
161	14	9 December 1961	New Man in the Manor	Missing
162	15	16 December 1961	The Lifters and the Leaners	Missing
163	16	23 December 1961	A Date to Remember	Missing
164	17	30 December 1961	Duffy Draws a Bonus	Missing
165	18	6 January 1962	Counsel for the Defence	Missing
166	19	13 January 1962	The Battle of Bellamy Court	Missing
167	20	20 January 1962	A Path through the Jungle	Missing
168	21	27 January 1962	An Escort for Harry	Missing
169	22	3 February 1962	The Flemish Giant	Missing
170	23	10 February 1962	A Special Kind of Jones	Missing
171	24	17 February 1962	The Cruel Streak	Missing
172	25	24 February 1962	The Outlaws	Missing
173	26	3 March 1962	Bells in My Ears	Missing

=== Series 9 (1962–63) ===
№ overall	№ in Series	Airdate	Title	Status
174	1	15 September 1962	Duffy Smells a Rat	Missing
175	2	22 September 1962	The Milkman Knocks on Friday	Missing
176	3	29 September 1962	Outside the Gates	Missing
177	4	6 October 1962	The Bullen Affair	Missing
178	5	13 October 1962	The High Price of Freedom	Missing
179	6	20 October 1962	Pressure	Missing
180	7	27 October 1962	Double Triangle	Missing
181	8	3 November 1962	Cause for Alarm	Missing
182	9	10 November 1962	All in the Line of Duty	Missing
183	10	17 November 1962	The Moonlighter	Missing
184	11	24 November 1962	A Home of One's Own	Exists
185	12	1 December 1962	Tower of Strength	Missing
186	13	8 December 1962	Cash and Carry	Missing
187	14	15 December 1962	Like Father, Like Son?	Missing
188	15	22 December 1962	Dead Jammy	Missing
189	16	29 December 1962	The Night after the Night Before	Missing
190	17	5 January 1963	Green Wedding	Exists
191	18	12 January 1963	The Old Couple	Missing
192	19	19 January 1963	Trail of a Gun	Missing
193	20	26 January 1963	The Bitter Taste of Youth	Missing
194	21	2 February 1963	Time Bomb	Missing
195	22	9 February 1963	The River People	Missing
196	23	16 February 1963	The Racket	Missing
197	24	23 February 1963	A Drop of the Real Stuff	Missing
198	25	2 March 1963	A Strange Affair	Missing
199	26	9 March 1963	A Woman Named Julie	Missing
200	27	16 March 1963	Before the Ball	Exists
201	28	23 March 1963	The End of the Trail	Missing

=== Series 10 (1963–64) ===
№ overall	№ in Series	Airdate	Title	Status
202	1	5 October 1963	Pay Later	Missing
203	2	12 October 1963	The Trouble with Spokey	Missing
204	3	19 October 1963	Beyond a Joke	Missing
205	4	26 October 1963	Second Chance	Missing
206	5	2 November 1963	Mail Snatch	Missing
207	6	9 November 1963	Unwelcome Stranger	Missing
208	7	16 November 1963	Thicker than Water	Missing
209	8	23 November 1963	The Switch	Missing
210	9	30 November 1963	The Torch Bearers	Missing
211	10	7 December 1963	The Gunman	Missing
212	11	14 December 1963	The Best Policy	Missing
213	12	21 December 1963	Christmas Dip	Missing
214	13	28 December 1963	Mrs. Conroy's Goldmine	Missing
215	14	4 January 1964	Night Caller	Missing
216	15	11 January 1964	Fish on the Hook	Missing
217	16	18 January 1964	The Home Builders	Missing
218	17	25 January 1964	Man on the Run	Missing
219	18	1 February 1964	Slim Jim	Missing
220	19	8 February 1964	Missing	Missing
221	20	15 February 1964	Final Appearance	Missing
222	21	22 February 1964	A Family Affair	Missing
223	22	29 February 1964	Child Hunt	Missing
224	23	7 March 1964	A Bit of Ol' Moggy	Missing
225	24	14 March 1964	A Right Artful Monkey	Missing
226	25	21 March 1964	The Fire Raiser	Missing
227	26	28 March 1964	The Witness	Missing

=== Series 11 (1964–65) ===
№ overall	№ in Series	Airdate	Title	Status
228	1	19 September 1964	Facing the Music	Missing
229	2	26 September 1964	The Night Man	Missing
230	3	3 October 1964	Fair Means or Foul	Missing
231	4	10 October 1964	Mister Farthing Takes a Walk	Missing
232	5	17 October 1964	Children Beware	Missing
233	6	24 October 1964	A Scrap of Paint	Exists
234	7	31 October 1964	Smithy	Missing
235	8	7 November 1964	Jigsaw	Missing
236	9	14 November 1964	The Root of All Evil	Missing
237	10	21 November 1964	All Sorts to Make a World	Missing
238	11	28 November 1964	Web of Lies	Missing
239	12	5 December 1964	Don't Play with Fire	Missing
240	13	12 December 1964	A Friend in Need	Missing
241	14	19 December 1964	Windfall	Missing
242	15	26 December 1964	Routine	Missing
243	16	2 January 1965	Other People's Lives	Missing
244	17	9 January 1965	Edward the Confessor	Missing
245	18	16 January 1965	A Bright Boy	Missing
246	19	23 January 1965	Find the Lady	Missing
247	20	30 January 1965	The Night of the Fog	Missing
248	21	6 February 1965	A Fine Art	Missing
249	22	13 February 1965	Within the Law	Missing
250	23	20 February 1965	You Just Walk Away	Missing
251	24	27 February 1965	The Inside Man	Fragments
252	25	6 March 1965	Forsaking All Others	Missing
253	26	13 March 1965	The Avenger	Missing

=== Series 12 (1965–66) ===
№ overall	№ in Series	Airdate	Title	Status
254	1	2 October 1965	Unlawful Possession	Missing
255	2	9 October 1965	Castles in the Air	Missing
256	3	16 October 1965	Saturday Night	Missing
257	4	23 October 1965	Detain Martin Spencer	Missing
258	5	30 October 1965	Act of Violence	Missing
259	6	6 November 1965	It's My Life	Missing
260	7	13 November 1965	All Clear	Missing
261	8	20 November 1965	Assailant Unknown	Missing
262	9	27 November 1965	The Man Who Was Going to Die	Missing
263	10	4 December 1965	The Late Customer	Missing
264	11	11 December 1965	The Intruders	Missing
265	12	18 December 1965	Witness Summons	Missing
266	13	25 December 1965	Georgina	Missing
267	14	1 January 1966	The Man on the Train	Missing
268	15	8 January 1966	'S' is for Squealer	Missing
269	16	15 January 1966	Routine Check	Missing
270	17	22 January 1966	Bullion	Missing
271	18	29 January 1966	Nothing to Say	Audio
272	19	5 February 1966	The Heister	Missing
273	20	12 February 1966	Just to Scare 'Em	Missing
274	21	19 February 1966	Touch and Go	Missing
275	22	26 February 1966	The Pact	Missing
276	23	5 March 1966	Face at the Window	Missing
277	24	12 March 1966	You Can't Buy a Miracle	Missing
278	25	19 March 1966	Death of a Donkeyman	Missing
279	26	26 March 1966	When Last Seen	Missing
280	27	2 April 1966	The Complaint	Missing
281	28	9 April 1966	The Samaritan Act	Missing
282	29	16 April 1966	The Fourth Finger	Missing
283	30	23 April 1966	Mr. X	Missing
284	31	30 April 1966	Manhunt	Missing

=== Series 13 (1966) ===
№ overall	№ in Series	Airdate	Title	Status
285	1	1 October 1966	The World of Silence	Picture
286	2	8 October 1966	Fire, Sleet and Candlelight	Missing
287	3	15 October 1966	Billy	Missing
288	4	22 October 1966	The Executioners	Missing
289	5	29 October 1966	The Wife	Fragments
290	6	5 November 1966	Grenade	Missing
291	7	12 November 1966	Dragon's Teeth	Fragments
292	8	19 November 1966	Guilty People	Missing
293	9	26 November 1966	The Hunt for June Fletcher	Missing
294	10	3 December 1966	Street of Fear, 1: The Job	Fragments
295	11	10 December 1966	Street of Fear, 2: Find Me a Witness	Fragments
296	12	17 December 1966	The Accident	Fragments
297	13	24 December 1966	The Golden Year	Missing

=== Series 14 (1967–68) ===
№ overall	№ in Series	Airdate	Title	Status
298	1	30 September 1967	The Mercenary	Fragments
299	2	7 October 1967	Case No. 7	Missing
300	3	14 October 1967	The Collectors	Fragments
301	4	21 October 1967	Zandra	Fragments
302	5	28 October 1967	Towpath	Missing
303	6	4 November 1967	The Witness	Missing
304	7	11 November 1967	The Party	Missing
305	8	18 November 1967	The Climber	Missing
306	9	25 November 1967	The Team	Exists
307	10	2 December 1967	The Run	Missing
308	11	9 December 1967	The Step-Brother	Missing
309	12	16 December 1967	The Hunch	Missing
310	13	23 December 1967	Six Till Two	Fragments
311	14	30 December 1967	The Old Pals Act	Missing
312	15	6 January 1968	Nightmare	Fragments
313	16	13 January 1968	The Attack	Fragments
314	17	20 January 1968	Olga and the Six Best Men	Missing
315	18	27 January 1968	Caesar's Wife	Missing
316	19	3 February 1968	The White Mercedes	Missing
317	20	10 February 1968	Ania	Missing

=== Series 15 (1968) ===
№ overall	№ in Series	Airdate	Title	Status
318	1	7 September 1968	Find the Lady	Fragments
319	2	14 September 1968	The Hard Way	Missing
320	3	21 September 1968	The Prospective Candidate	Missing
321	4	28 September 1968	An Ordinary Man	Fragments
322	5	5 October 1968	The Brothers	Missing
323	6	12 October 1968	A Quiet Sunday	Fragments
324	7	19 October 1968	Double Jeopardy	Audio
325	8	26 October 1968	The Commander	Missing
326	9	2 November 1968	The Last Look	Missing
327	10	9 November 1968	Number Thirteen	Missing
328	11	16 November 1968	English – Born and Bred	Missing
329	12	23 November 1968	High Finance	Missing
330	13	30 November 1968	The Man	Missing
331	14	7 December 1968	Suspended	Missing
332	15	14 December 1968	The Trojan Horse	Audio
333	16	21 December 1968	Berserk	Missing

=== Series 16 (1969) ===
This series was the first to be produced in colour.

№ overall	№ in Series	Airdate	Title	Status
334	1	6 September 1969	The Paper Hangers	Missing
335	2	13 September 1969	Breaking Point	Missing
336	3	20 September 1969	Obsession	Missing
337	4	27 September 1969	Copper's Luck	Missing
338	5	4 October 1969	Protest	Missing
339	6	11 October 1969	No Love Lost	Missing
340	7	18 October 1969	Notify If Found	Missing
341	8	25 October 1969	Exclusive Story	Missing
342	9	1 November 1969	End of a Copper	Missing
343	10	8 November 1969	The Intruder	Missing
344	11	15 November 1969	The Brimstone Man	Missing
345	12	22 November 1969	The Reluctant Witness	Missing
346	13	29 November 1969	The Jelly Man	Missing
347	14	6 December 1969	Whose Turn Next	Missing
348	15	13 December 1969	The Set-Up	Missing
349	16	20 December 1969	Bobby	Missing
350	17	27 December 1969	The One That Got Away	Missing

=== Series 17 (1970–71) ===
№ overall	№ in Series	Airdate	Title	Status
351	1	14 November 1970	Waste Land	Exists
352	2	21 November 1970	The Undercover Man	Missing
353	3	28 November 1970	The House in Albert Street	Missing
354	4	5 December 1970	Shadows	Missing
355	5	12 December 1970	The Stranger	Missing
356	6	19 December 1970	File No. 7/948732/462	Missing
357	7	26 December 1970	The Lag's Brigade	Missing
358	8	2 January 1971	Thin Thread	Missing
359	9	9 January 1971	Two Children	Missing
360	10	16 January 1971	As Good as a Picnic	Missing
361	11	23 January 1971	Mug's Game	Missing
362	12	30 January 1971	Honour among Thieves	Missing
363	13	6 February 1971	Shotgun	Missing
364	14	13 February 1971	Nightmare Hours	Audio
365	15	20 February 1971	No One Loses	Missing
366	16	27 February 1971	The Silent Man	Missing
367	17	6 March 1971	Sleigh Ride	Missing

=== Series 18 (1971–72) ===
№ overall	№ in Series	Airdate	Title	Status
368	1	20 November 1971	Jig-Saw	Exists
369	2	27 November 1971	The Fighter	Missing
370	3	4 December 1971	Flashpoint	Missing
371	4	11 December 1971	The Man from the Ministry	Missing
372	5	18 December 1971	Imagination	Missing
373	6	27 December 1971	Wingy	Missing
374	7	1 January 1972	Molenzicht	Exists
375	8	8 January 1972	The Informant	Missing
376	9	15 January 1972	Findings Keepings	Missing
377	10	22 January 1972	Night Beat	Missing
378	11	29 January 1972	The Bad Debt Man	Missing
379	12	5 February 1972	First Offenders	Missing
380	13	12 February 1972	Sergeant George Dixon	Missing

=== Series 19 (1972) ===
№ overall	№ in Series	Airdate	Title	Status
381	1	23 September 1972	The Specialist	Missing
382	2	30 September 1972	Time Out	Missing
383	3	7 October 1972	The Finger Man	Fragments
384	4	14 October 1972	Trial and Error	Missing
385	5	21 October 1972	Gun Point	Missing
386	6	28 October 1972	Conspiracy of Silence	Missing
387	7	4 November 1972	Homecoming	Missing
388	8	11 November 1972	Mrs. Raven	Missing
389	9	18 November 1972	Starpoint West	Missing
390	10	25 November 1972	Bust Up	Missing
391	11	2 December 1972	Whiplash	Missing
392	12	9 December 1972	Who Needs Enemies?	Missing
393	13	16 December 1972	Ada	Missing
394	14	30 December 1972	The Loser	Missing

=== Series 20 (1973–74) ===
№ overall	№ in Series	Airdate	Title	Status
395	1	29 December 1973	Eye Witness	Exists
396	2	5 January 1974	Knocker	Missing
397	3	12 January 1974	Harry's Back	Exists
398	4	19 January 1974	Question in the House	Missing
399	5	26 January 1974	The Unwanted	Fragments
400	6	2 February 1974	Stitch-Up	Missing
401	7	9 February 1974	Full Circle	Missing
402	8	16 February 1974	There's Your Story: There's My Story – and There's the Truth	Audio
403	9	23 February 1974	Pay-Off	Missing
404	10	2 March 1974	Cat-Walk	Missing
405	11	9 March 1974	Snout	Missing
406	12	16 March 1974	The Long Memory	Missing
407	13	23 March 1974	Jack the Lad	Missing
408	14	30 March 1974	A Sense of Guilt	Missing
409	15	6 April 1974	Three's Company	Missing
410	16	13 April 1974	Sounds	Exists
411	17	20 April 1974	Firearms Were Issued	Exists

=== Series 21 (1975) ===
№ overall	№ in Series	Airdate	Title	Status
412	1	15 February 1975	Target	Exists
413	2	22 February 1975	Seven for a Secret – Never to be Told	Exists
414	3	1 March 1975	It's a Gift	Missing
415	4	8 March 1975	Black Monday	Missing
416	5	15 March 1975	Baubles, Bangles and Beads	Exists
417	6	22 March 1975	On a Moody Complaint	Missing
418	7	29 March 1975	Looters Ltd	Exists
419	8	5 April 1975	The Hired Man	Missing
420	9	12 April 1975	For Better, for Worse	Missing
421	10	19 April 1975	A Slight Case of Love	Exists
422	11	26 April 1975	Pot of Gold	Missing
423	12	3 May 1975	Chain of Events	Fragments
424	13	10 May 1975	Conspiracy	Exists

=== Series 22 (1976) ===
This series is the only series to have no episodes missing. This was the final series.

№ overall	№ in Series	Airdate	Title	Status
425	1	13 March 1976	Domino	Exists
426	2	20 March 1976	The Job	Exists
427	3	27 March 1976	Vagrant	Exists
428	4	3 April 1976	Everybody's Business	Exists
429	5	10 April 1976	Alice	Exists
430	6	17 April 1976	Jackpot	Exists
431	7	24 April 1976	Legacy	Exists
432	8	1 May 1976	Reunion	Exists
