= Dark Avenger (disambiguation) =

Dark Avenger was the pseudonym of a computer virus writer from Sofia, Bulgaria.

Dark Avenger may also refer to:

- "Dark Avenger" (song), a song by Manowar
- Dark Avengers, 2009–2013 American comic book series published by Marvel Comics
- The Dark Avenger, a 1955 film
