= List of World's End Harem volumes =

World's End Harem is a Japanese manga series written by LINK and illustrated by Kotaro Shōno. The manga began its serialization on Shueisha's online magazine Shōnen Jump+ on May 8, 2016. In May 2020, it was announced that the first part of the manga reached its climax. The first part of the manga finished with its 85th chapter on June 21, 2020. In March 2021, it was announced that the second part of the manga, titled World's End Harem: After World, would start to be published on Shōnen Jump+ on May 9 of that year. Shueisha has collected its chapters into individual tankōbon volumes. The first volume was published on September 2, 2016. As of June 2, 2023, eighteen volumes have been released. In October 2017, Seven Seas Entertainment announced the acquisition of the manga for an English language release under its Ghost Ship imprint for mature readers.

== Volumes ==
=== World's End Harem (first part) ===
No.	Original release date	Original ISBN	English release date	English ISBN
1	September 2, 2016	978-4-08-880819-2	April 17, 2018	978-1-947804-09-8
1. "Cold Sleep" (コールドスリープ, Kōrudo Surīpu); 2. "The Women's World" (女(おんな)たちの世界(せかい), On'na-tachi no Sekai); 3. "Five Billion" (50億, 50 Oku); 4. "The First Man" (第1の男, Dai-Ichi no Otoko); 5. "Clue" (手がかり, Tegakari); 6. "Decision" (決意, Ketsui)
2	December 31, 2016	978-4-08-880842-0	July 3, 2018	978-1-947804-12-8
7. "Two Women" (二人の女性, Futari no Josei); 8. "Lost Person" (失われしもの, Ushinawa Reshi Mono); 9. "Disparity" (格差, Kakusa); 10. "A Deal" (取引, Torihiki); 11. "World Declaration" (世界宣言, Sekai Sengen); 12. "Common Sight" (ありふれ た 光景, Arifureta Kōkei); 13. "The Third Man" (第3の男, Dai-San no Otoko); 14. "A New Life" (新生活, Shin Seikatsu)
3	June 2, 2017	978-4-08-881087-4	October 9, 2018	978-1-947804-26-5
15. "First Sexual Experience" (初体験, Shotaiken); 16. "School Life" (学校生活, Gakkō Seikatsu); 17. "Swimming Time" (水泳の時間, Suiei no Jikan); 18. "Natsu Ichijō" (一条奈都, Ichijō Natsu); 19. "The Academy's Secret" (学園の秘密, Gakuen no Himitsu); 20. "Change" (変化, Henka); 21. "Two Secretaries" (二人の担当官, Futari no Tankō-kan)
4	October 4, 2017	978-4-08-881243-4	February 19, 2019	978-1-947804-30-2
22. "Hot Springs" (温泉, Onsen); 23. "Physical Examination" (健康診断, Kenkōshinda); 24. "Strange Exchange Student" (奇妙な留学生, Kimyōna Ryūgakusei); 25. "Doubts" (疑念, Ginen); 26. "Entanglement" (交錯, Kōsaku); 27. "Shunka Hiiragi" (柊春歌, Hiiragi Shunka); 28. "Akira Tōdō" (東堂晶, Tōdō Akira)
5	February 2, 2018	978-4-08-881438-4	June 11, 2019	978-1-947804-36-4
29. "The School Infirmary's Secret" (保健室の秘事, Hoken-shitsu no Hiji); 30. "Transfer Student" (転校生, Tenkōsei); 31. "Line of Sight" (視線, Shisen); 32. "Entangled Motives" (絡み合う思惑, Karamiau Omowaku); 33. "Refugee District" (難民地区, Nanmin Chiku); 34. "Inference" (推論, Suiron); Special. "Kyōji Hino's Great Day" (火野恭司の華麗なる一日, Hino Kyōji no Kareinaru Tsuitachi)
6	July 4, 2018	978-4-08-881523-7	September 24, 2019	978-1-947804-44-9
35. "Mysterious Institution" (謎(なぞ)の施設(しせつ), Nazo no Shisetsu); 36. "Conspiracy" (陰謀(いんぼう), Inbō); 37. "Rikka Yanagi" (柳(やなぎ)律(りっ)香(か), Yanagi Rikka); 38. "Revenge" (復讐(ふくしゅう), Fukushū); 39. "The Jin Ping Mei of 2045" (2045年(ねん)の金瓶梅(きんぺいばい), Nisenyonjūgo-nen no Kinpeibai); 40. "Pool Play" (プール遊(あそ)び, Pūru Asobi); 41. "Revenge" (意趣返(いしゅがえ)し, Ishu-gaeshi)
7	November 2, 2018	978-4-08-881634-0	December 17, 2019	978-1-947804-50-0
42. "Meat Forest" (肉(にく)の森林(しんりん), Niku no Shinrin); 43. "The Outside World" (外(そと)の世界(せかい), Soto no Sekai); 44. "The Fourth Man" (第(だい)4の男(おとこ), Dai-Yon no Otoko); 45. "To Each Fabric of Human Relationships" (それぞれの人間模様(にんげんもよう), Sorezore no Ningen Moyō); 46. "Ritual" (秘儀(ひぎ), Higi); 47. "The World Headquarters's Plot Part 1" (世界(せかい)本部(ほんぶ)の企(たくら)み 前篇(ぜんぺん), Sekai Honbu no Takurami Senhen); 48. "The World Headquarters's Plot Part 2" (世界(せかい)本部(ほんぶ)の企(たくら)み 後編(こうへん), Sekai Honbu no Takurami Kōhen)
8	March 4, 2019	978-4-08-881762-0	March 31, 2020	978-1-947804-55-5
49. "Two Nos." (二人(ふたり)のナンバーズ, Futari no Nanbāzu); 50. "Tears" (涙(なみだ), Namida); 51. "Escape" (脱出(だっしゅつ), Dasshutsu); 52. "A Man's Resolve" (男(おとこ)の覚悟(かくご), Otoko no Kakugo); 53. "Summer Memories" (夏(なつ)の思(おも)い出(で), Natsu no Omoide); 54. "Reunion" (再会(さいかい), Saikai); 55. "Izanami's Village" (イザナミの村(むら), Izanami no Mura)
9	August 2, 2019	978-4-08-882044-6	November 24, 2020	978-1-947804-60-9
56. "Last Night" (前夜(ぜんや), Zen'ya); 57. "Holy Spirit Purification" (聖心祓穢(せいしんはらいきたな), Senshin Harai Kita na); 58. "Kuniumi" (国産(くにい)み); 59. "A Promise" (約束(やくそく), Yakusoku); 60. "Immoral" (卑略(ひりゃく), Hiryaku); 61. "Friction" (摩擦(まさつ), Masatsu); 62. "Arousal" (挑発(ちょうはつ), Chōhatsu)
10	January 4, 2020	978-4-08-882188-7	February 23, 2021	978-1-648274-86-2
63. "Prophesying the Future" (占(うらな)われる未来(みらい), Uranawa Reru Mirai); 64. "Ready to be Tested" (試(ため)される覚悟(かくご), Tamesa Reru Kakugo); 65. "Grand Duchess of Losania" (ロスアニア大(だい)公女(こうじょ), Rosuania Dai-Kōjiyo); 66. "Genius Scientist" (天才(てんさい)科学者(かがくしゃ), Tensai Kagakusha); 67. "The Only Clear Way" (たったひとつの冴(さ)えるやり方(かた), Tatta Hitotsu no Saeru yarikata); 68. "The Five Women" (5人(にん)の女性(じょせい), Go-nin no Josei); 69. "Maria Kuroda" (黒田(くろだ)マリア, Kuroda Maria)
11	May 13, 2020	978-4-08-882304-1	June 15, 2021	978-1-947804-87-6
70. "Akane Ryūzōji" (龍造寺朱音, Ryūzōji Akane); 71. "Anastasia" (アナスタシア, Anasutashia); 72. "Lu Bingbing" (ルー・ビンビン, Rū Binbin); 73. "Five Years Ago" (5年(ねん)前(まえ), Gonen Mae); 74. "Elisa's Past" (絵理沙(えりさ)の過去(かこ), Erisa no Kako); 75. "Backup" (バックアップ, Bakkuappu); 76. "First Memory" (最初(さいしょ)の記憶(きおく), Saisho no Kioku); 77. "Vaccine Development" (ワクチン開発(かいはつ), Wakuchin Kaihatsu); Special. "In the School Infirmary..." (保健室(ほけんしつ)にて..., Hoken-shitsu-nite...)
12	August 4, 2020	978-4-08-882457-4	October 12, 2021	978-1-648275-06-7
78. "Abyss of Death" (死(し)の淵(ふち), Shi no Fuchi); 79. "The Hope of Humanity" (人類(じんるい)の希望(きぼう), Jinrui no Kibō); 80. "Kyoji and Neneko" (恭司(きょうじ)と寧々子(ねねこ), Kyōji to Neneko); 81. "Destiny's Day" (運命(うんめい)の日(ひ), Unmei no Hi); 82. "Elisa's Proposal" (絵理沙(えりさ)の提案(ていあん), Erisa no Teian); 83. "Two People" (二人(ふたり), Futari); 84. "Raid" (襲撃(しゅうげき), Shūgeki); 85. "New Age" (新(あら)たなる時代(じだい), Aratanaru jidai)

=== World's End Harem: After World (second part) ===
No.	Original release date	Original ISBN	English release date	English ISBN
13	October 4, 2021	978-4-08-882817-6	December 20, 2022	978-1-63858-309-7
86. "Ten Thousand Times Women" (一万(いちまん)倍(ばい)の女(おんな)たち, Ichiman-bai no On'na-tachi); 87. "Housemate" (ハウスメイト, Hausumeito); 88. "Communal Life" (共同生活(きょうどうせいかつ), Kyōdō Seikatsu); 89. "Reito's Mission" (怜人(れいと)の使命(しめい), Reito no Shimei); 90. "Why We Were Chosen" (選(えら)ばれた理由(りゆう), Eraba Reta Riyū); 91. "Saving the World or Disaster" (世界(せかい)を救(すく)うもの あるいは厄災(やくさい), Sekai o Sukuu Mono Aruiwa Yaku Wazawai)
14	January 4, 2022	978-4-08-882853-4	April 11, 2023	978-1-63858-867-2
92. "First Date" (初(はつ)デート, Hatsu Dēto); 93. "The Secret Signal" (秘密(ひみつ)の合図(あいず), Himitsu no Aizu); 94. "Reito's Mission" (怜人(れいと)の使命(しめい), Reito no Shimei); 95. "Beach Resort" (ビーチリゾート, Bīchi Rizōto); 96. "Tropical Beach Volleyball" (南国ビーチバレー, Nangoku Bīchi Barē); 97. "Sparkler" (線香花火, Senkō Hanabi); 98. "That Person's Heart" (あの人の心臓, Ano Hito no Shinzō); 99. "Targeted Person" (狙われる者, Nerawa Reru Mono)
15	May 2, 2022	978-4-08-883105-3	August 29, 2023	978-1-68579-588-7
100. "Real Role" (本当の役割, Hontō no Yakuwari); 101. "Reproduction" (生殖, Seishoku); 102. "Limited Time" (限りある時間, Kagiri aru Jikan); 103. "Exchange Meeting" (交流会, Kōryūkai); 104. "Yuria Love Dog" (百合愛の愛犬, Yuria no Aiken); 105. "True Aim" (真の狙い, Shin no Nerai); 106. "Together with Two People" (二人で共に, Futari de Tomoni); 107. "Woman's Desire" (女の欲求, On'na no Yokkyū)
16	September 2, 2022	978-4-08-883254-8	December 12, 2023	979-8-88843-077-4
108. "Sakura Kanamura" (金村 桜, Kanemaru Sakura); 109. "Family Memory" (家族の記憶, Kazoku no Kioku); 110. "Older Sister and Younger Brother" (姉と弟, Ane to Otōto); 111. "Companion" (同行者, Dōkōsha); 112. "Izanami Village" (イザナミ村, Izanami Mura); 113. "Village Life (村の生活, Mura no Seikatsu); 114. "Assault" (強襲, Kyōshū); 115. "Thoughts of Sakura" (桜の想い, Sakura no Omoi)
17	May 2, 2023	978-4-08-883550-1	April 23, 2024	979-8-88843-422-2
116. "Distant Memories" (遠い記憶, Tōi Kioku); 117. "Adoring Love" (恋慕, Renbo); 118. "Laboratory Animals" (実験動物, Jikken Dōbutsu); 119. "The Womb of the Holy Mother" (聖母の子宮, Seibo no Shikyū); 120. "Reia and Mira" (麗亜と美来, Reia to Mira); 121. "The Future of the World" (世界の行方, Sekai no Yukue); 122. "The Shop from Back Then" (あの時の店, Ano Toki no Mise); 123. "Confinement" (監禁, Kankin)
18	June 2, 2023	978-4-08-883624-9	December 31, 2024	979-8-89160-314-1
124. "Heart" (こころ, Kokoro); 125. "Proliferation" (増殖, Zōshoku); 126. "Choice" (選択, Sentaku); 127. "Abnormality" (異変, Ihen); 128. "The Sound of Ruin" (破滅の音, Hametsu no Oto); 129. "Beyond Good and Evil" (善悪の彼岸, Zenaku no Higan); 130. "The End of the World" (世界の終わり, Sekai no Owari); 131. "Gathering Our Thoughts and Feelings" (思いを集めて, Omoi o Atsumete); 132. "The World Will Never End" (世界は決して終わらない, Sekai wa Kesshite Owaranai)
