= HMS Avenger (1803) =

Sloop-of-war, previously the civilian vessel Elizabeth, launched in 1801 at Bridlington

History

United Kingdom
- Name: Elizabeth
- Builder: Bridlington
- Launched: 1801
- Fate: Sold 1803

United Kingdom
- Name: HMS Avenger
- Acquired: 1803 by purchase
- Fate: Wrecked 5 December 1803

General characteristics
- Class & type: Flush-decked ship-sloop
- Tons burthen: 206, or 26371/94 (bm)
- Length: 96 ft 6 in (29.4 m) (overall); 77 ft 3 in (23.5 m) (keel)
- Beam: 25 ft 4 in (7.7 m)
- Complement: 80
- Armament: 14 × 24-pounder carronades

HMS Avenger was a sloop-of-war, previously the civilian vessel Elizabeth, launched in 1801 at Bridlington. The British Royal Navy purchased her in 1803 and commissioned her in October 1803 under Commander Francis Snell. but she foundered in Heligoland Bight, off the Weser, on 5 December 1803; the crew were saved.

Avenger had been stationed off the German coast to blockade the Elbe River. She took on board a pilot who proceeded, with confidence, to steer her south despite soundings indicating shallowing water. After she grounded, attempts were made to get her off, but they failed. Fishing vessels came up and took off the crew.

The court-martial on 18 January 1804 at Sheerness acquitted Commander Snell, his officers, and his crew of the loss of their vessel, but reprimanded the pilot for his ignorance. As the pilot had disappeared soon after landing, this judgment presumably had no effect on him.
