= Difenzoquat =

Names
- IUPAC name 1,2-dimethyl-3,5-diphenylpyrazolium
- Preferred IUPAC name 1,2-dimethyl-3,5-diphenylpyrazol-1-ium
- Other names 1,2-dimethyl-3,5-diphenyl-1H-pyrazolium

Identifiers
CAS Number	49866-87-7
3D model (JSmol)	Interactive image
ChEBI	CHEBI:81910
ChEMBL	ChEMBL2096924
ChemSpider	36047
ECHA InfoCard	100.051.352
EC Number	256-505-3
KEGG	C18717
PubChem CID	39425
UNII	54NE792QN5
CompTox Dashboard (EPA)	DTXSID6043965
- InChI: InChI=1S/C17H17N2/c1-18-16(14-9-5-3-6-10-14)13-17(19(18)2)15-11-7-4-8-12-15/h3-13H,1-2H3/q+1 Key: LBGPXIPGGRQBJW-UHFFFAOYSA-N
- SMILES: CN1C(=CC(=[N+]1C)C2=CC=CC=C2)C3=CC=CC=C3

Properties
Chemical formula	C_{17}H_{17}N_{2}
Molar mass	249.337 g·mol^{−1}
Appearance	Colourless, odourless crystals
Melting point	155 °C (311 °F; 428 K)
Boiling point	Decomposes before boiling

Hazards
- Lethal dose or concentration (LD, LC)
LD_{50} (median dose)	470mg/kg (oral, rat)

Related compounds
Related compounds	Difenzoquat metilsulfate
- Except where otherwise noted, data are given for materials in their standard state (at 25 °C [77 °F], 100 kPa). Infobox references

Difenzoquat is a selective, postemergent herbicide used to control wild oats in barley and wheat, and first registered in the US in 1975.

Difenzoquat is a phenylpyrazole and pyrazole herbicide, and a quaternary ammonium compound. It is absorbed via the foliage and acts by rapidly destroying cell membranes.

== Usage ==
In the US, difenzoquat is applied once per season as a ground or aerial broadcast treatment; it is sold as a soluble concentrate (96%) or liquid (e.g. "Avenge", a 31.2% formulation), and 64 to 77% of difenzoquat sold is applied to wheat, as of 1994.

It has also been marketed as "Finaven", "Yeh-Yan-Ku" and "Mataven".

== Safety ==
Difenzoquat is a severe eye irritant, and has moderate acute toxicity on skin contact or via ingestion. Subchronic oral trials showed no effects on dogs, but rabbits in a dermal study developed skin reactions. In chronic trials, rats lost weight without other effect; dogs lost weight, suffered high mortality, developing tremors, lethargy and irregular gait.

Difenzoquat appears to be non-carcinogenic. It is not mutagenic. The EPA estimates that humans are exposed to extremely low-level residues which pose no known risks. Its NOEL is 25 mg/kg/day.

== Environmental behaviour ==
Difenzoquat is persistent and relatively immobile in soil, with little risk of groundwater contamination. Difenzoquat's persistence is slightly uncertain though, as field trials indicate it dissipates much more quickly than believed.

Difenzoquat is practically non-toxic to birds (LD_{50} of 10338 mg/kg) and freshwater fish, (LC_{50} of 76 mg/L) but moderately toxic to freshwater invertebrates. (LC_{50} of 2.6mg/L) It is non-toxic to honey bees. Chronic ecological toxicity is thought to be unlikely.

== Chemical properties ==
Aqueous solutions of difenzoquat can be effectively filtered with activated charcoal adsorption. One test removed 99.9% of difenzoquat this way, and 47% of paraquat and 46% of diquat, although with electrosorption those could be filtered to over 98%.
