= 893239 =

- DVD Cover
- Directed by: Multiple directors
- Produced by: Jingu-mae Produce
- Starring: Multiple actors
- Country: Japan
- Language: Japanese

893239 or Yakuza-Nijūsan-Ku (ヤクザ23区) (Note: The title is Japanese wordplay, with "893" meaning "yakuza", and "9" as ku.) is the project name for a collection of short films based on Yakuza (Japanese Mafia) and 23 ku (区, special wards) in Tokyo, Japan. Each clip is about 5–18 minutes long and is shot by a different director with his own crew from various backgrounds.

The project covers almost all the 23 wards in Tokyo with an extra episode shot in the City of Torrance (which has the biggest Japanese population in the continental US) in Los Angeles County. This project was promoted through its official website with trailers and through YouTube where each entire movie is shown.

== Background ==
=== Film shooting ===
The films were shot and edited between 2005 and 2006 by 23 different producers in one of the 26 wards in Tokyo which they liked to shoot a movie about.

=== Media exposure ===
During the first promotion phase (November 27-February 14), the movies were in Japanese only, but English-subtitled versions were added in early February 2007. (These newly added versions were planned to be broadcast on YouTube until the end of February 2007.) January 28, 2007 Yahoo!Japan announced in its MOVIE section that 893239 collections had over 100,000 accesses on YouTube. Sports Houchi (daily newspaper) had its first coverage on 893239.

== Filmmakers ==
- Produced by – Jingu-mae Produce
- Executive producer – Koji Tsujimoto
- Creative director – Koji Masui

== Film collections ==
As of August 2007, most of these were seemingly removed from YouTube by their uploaders.

English Title" (Original Title) Alphabetical order by English title. (Film Runtime: MM:SS)

- 893239 Meguro-ku "As for the Fingers" (Yubikiri) 1/2 05:16 2/2 06:20
- 893239 Shibuya-ku "BE HAPPY" 07:40
- 893239 Nakano-ku "Beyond the FOREST of MAN" (Yakuza no Mori) 04:36
- 893239 Suginami-ku "Bluce of Koenji" 07:41
- 893239 Setagaya-ku "Dai Chan" 1/2 06:38 2/2 06:09
- 893239 Koutou-ku "FUKAGAWA" 1/2 05:32 2/2 07:12
- 893239 Adachi-ku "Hooligan is beautiful" (Chinpira is beautiful) 06:33
- 893239 Toshima-ku "Ikebukuro Violence Zone~Elevated Passageway of Man~" (Yakuza-no Hanamichi) 07:57
- 893239 Itabashi-ku "INFERNO" 05:00
- 893239 Ota-ku "Jin, Hiroki and Me, A Sister" (Jin to Hiroki to Imoto no Atashi) 10:57
- 893239 Los Angeles "Last Call～last episode～" 10:04 Directed by Satoshi Nakagawa ( Insomniac Dream Films)
- 893239 Sumida-ku "Local Industry of Sumida" (Sumida-ku no Jiba Sangyo) 10:58
- 893239 Suginami-ku "NO BORDER, NO 893" 05:11
- 893239 Chiyoda-ku "Overdose -the documentary" 10:49
- 893239 Taito-ku "Pearl" (Shinju) *Original version has been deleted by YouTube
- 893239 Adachi-ku "Revenge" (Fukushu) 1/2 05:31 2/2 07:16
- 893239 Sumida-ku "Running Flamenco" (Hashiru Flamenco) 10:25 Starred by Hideo Takahashi (A flamenco guitarist)
- 893239 Shinjuku-ku "Shinjuku-park" (Shinjuku-Gyoen) 08:33 *Directed by Junya Okabe (Buildup)
- 893239 Nerima-ku "Shooting Yakuza" (Satsuei Yakuza) 10:59 *Directed by Macoto Tezuka
- 893239 Minato-ku "Sweet Knife" 07:43
- 893239 Katsushika-ku "Today Event" (Kyou no Dekigoto) 07:57
- 893239 Kita-ku "Too Nervous Finger" (Yubi-Kitchou) 1/2 08:24 2/2 08:50
- 893239 Shibuya-ku "What is this......" (Nani Sore) 07:22
- 893239 Edogawa-ku "Yakuza's Delivery" (Yakuza-no Takuhaibin) 09:38
