= The Avenger (sculpture) =

Monument in Doylestown, Pennsylvania, United States

- Interactive map of The Avenger
- Location: 654 Ferry Road, Doylestown, Pennsylvania, United States
- Coordinates: 40°19′18.38″N 75°10′50.61″W
- Designer: Andrzej Pityński
- Type: Statue
- Material: Bronze (statue); Granite (pedestal)
- Height: 32.8 ft (10.0 m)
- Opening date: August 14, 1988
- Dedicated to: Katyn massacre

The Avenger (Polish: Mściciel) is a bronze sculpture dedicated to the victims of the Katyn massacre, located near Doylestown, Pennsylvania, United States. It is placed at the Polish military cemetery near the National Shrine of Our Lady of Czestochowa. It was designed by Andrzej Pityński, and unveiled on August 14, 1988. The sculpture has the height of 32.8 ft (10 m), and includes a bronze statue of a Polish hussar, a heavy-cavalry soldier in armour decorated with wings on his back, kneeling on one leg and supporting himself with a sword stuck into the ground, placed on a granite pedestal.

== History ==
The monument was designed by Andrzej Pityński, and unveiled on August 14, 1988. It became a location to various celebrations organised by the Polish Army Veterans' Association in America.

On April 18, 2010, diplomatic representatives of Poland laid flowers under the monument, in memory of 96 casualties of the crash of Tupolev Tu-154 aircraft in Smolensk, Russia, including President of Poland, Lech Kaczyński, First Lady Maria Kaczyńska, and other high-ranking government officials. The plane was en route to commemorations of the Katyn massacre anniversary. On April 10, 2011, one year since the disaster, and the monument pedetal was installed a plaque in memory of the event. The ceremony was attended by around 800 people, including Robert Kupiecki, the ambassador of Poland to the United States, and Ewa Junczyk-Ziomecka, the consul general of Poland in New York City.

On August 15, 2021, Andrzej Pityński was commemorated in his hometown of Ulanów, Poland, with an unveiling a mural, depicting the sculpture The Avenger. It was painted by Michał Czerko and Michał Mach.

== Characteristics ==
The sculpture has the height of 32.8 ft (10 m), and includes a bronze statue of a Polish hussar, a heavy-cavalry soldier in armour decorated with wings on his back, kneeling on one leg and supporting himself with a sword stuck into the ground. It is placed on a granite pedestal. Some critics compared it to the motive of a lone warrior, sometimes present among immigrant communities in the United States.

The pedestal is decorated with two plaques. First, dating to 1988, has large text which reads "KATYŃ 1940". It also bears an inspiration with a quote from the 1952 report of the United States House Select Committee to Conduct an Investigation of the Facts, Evidence, and Circumstances of the Katyn Forest Massacre, which investigated the Katyn massacre between 1951 and 1952. It reads:

This Committee unanimously finds, beyond any question of reasonable doubt, that the Soviet NKVD (People's Commissariat of Internal Affairs) committed the mass murders of the Polish officers and intellectual leaders in the Katyń Forest near Smolensk, Russia. Excerpt from the Report of the Select Committee filed with the Congress of the United States on July 2, 1952, House of Representatives No 2430.

The second plaque, added in 2011, has text which reads "SMOLEŃSK 2010", and is dedicated to the 96 victims of the crash of Tupolev Tu-154 aircraft in Smolensk, Russia, including President of Poland, Lech Kaczyński, First Lady Maria Kaczyńska, and other high-ranking government officials. It bears an inspiration in Polish, which reads:

Polish text

Pamięci prezydenta Rzeczypospolitej Polskiej Lecha Kaczyńskiego i jego małżonki Marii wraz z delegacją 94 osób udającą się na uroczystości 70 rocznicy mordu katyńskiego, którzy zginęli w katastrofie samolotu 10 kwietnia 2010 roku.

Translation:
English translation

In memory of the President of the Republic of Poland, Lech Kaczyński, and his wife Maria, together with the delegation of 94 people, en route to the ceremony of the 70th anniversary of the Karyń massacre, whom died in the air disaster of April 10, 2010.
