= Law without the state =

Law without the state (also called transnational stateless law, stateless law, or private legal orderings) is law made primarily outside of the power of a state.

Such law may be established in several ways:

- It may emerge in systems such as existed in feudal Europe prior to the emergence of the modern nation state with the treaty of Westphalia.
- It can be established as customary law such as that practiced by indigenous communities.
- Non-state actors may create it, for instance in the form of "soft law".
- According to various theories of anarchist law, it could result from how a society would organize itself without formal government.

== See also ==
- List of national legal systems – System for interpreting and enforcing the laws
- Religious law – Ethical and moral codes taught by religious traditions
- Islamic Courts Union – Somali legal and political organization (2000–2009)
- Beth Din – Rabbinical court of Judaism
- Kris (Romani court) – Romani traditional court
- Jirga – Assembly of Pashtun tribal leaders
- Lex Mercatoria – Part of the history of contract law
