= HMS Avenger =

Nine ships of the Royal Navy have been named HMS Avenger:

- HMS Avenger was a sloop-of-war launched in 1778 as the 8-gun fireship HMS Lucifer. She was renamed HMS Avenger on her conversion to a sloop in 1779 and was sold in 1783.
- HMS Avenger (1794) was a 16-gun sloop-of-war, formerly the French Vengeur. She was captured in 1794 and sold in 1802.
- HMS Avenger (1803) was a sloop-of-war, previously the civilian vessel Elizabeth. She was purchased in 1803 and foundered later that year.
- HMS Avenger (1804) was an 18-gun sloop-of-war, formerly the collier Thames. She was purchased in 1804 and wrecked in 1812.
- HMS Avenger (1845) was a wooden paddle frigate launched in 1845 and wrecked off North Africa in 1847.
- HMS Avenger (1915) was an armed merchant cruiser torpedoed and sunk on 14 June 1917 by SM U-69.
- HMS Avenger (D14) was an Avenger-class escort carrier, laid down as the merchant vessel Rio Hudson but converted and launched in 1940. She was transferred to the Royal Navy under lend-lease and was sunk by U-155 in 1942.
- HMS Avenger (LST 3011) was a Landing Ship, Tank launched in 1945 as LST 3011. She was renamed HMS Avenger in 1947 and was sold to the Royal Indian Navy in 1949, being renamed Magar in 1951.
- HMS Avenger (F185) was a Type 21 frigate launched in 1975. She fought in the Falklands War, and was sold to Pakistan in 1994 and renamed Tippu Sultan.

== Battle honours ==
Ships named Avenger have earned the following battle honours:

- Martinique, 1794
- North Africa, 1942
- Arctic, 1942
- Falkland Islands, 1982

== In fiction ==
The Alexander Kent novel "Midshipman Bolitho and the Avenger" features a 10 gun Royal Navy Cutter named Avenger.
