= Retorsion =

Unfriendly but lawful reaction

Retorsion (from French: rétorsion, from Latin: retortus, influenced by Late Latin, 1585–1595, torsi, a twisting, wringing it), a term used in international law, is an act perpetrated by one nation upon another in retaliation for a similar act perpetrated by the other nation. A typical example of retorsion is the use of comparably severe measures against citizens of the foreign nation found within the borders of the retaliating nation after the foreign nation has engaged in similar acts. It is different from a reprisal in that the retorsion is always an action in conformity with international law, though unmistakably an unfriendly one. Examples include international trade, where disputes within the World Trade Organization are typically tackled in this manner, if dispute settlement does not reach its goal.

The term is also used to refer to the least aggressive response to a cyberattack.

Retorsion also signifies the act by which an individual returns to his adversary evil for evil.

== See also ==
- Revenge
- Eye for an eye
