= Beati Paoli =

Alleged secret society in medieval Sicily

Beati Paoli is the name of a secretive sect thought to have existed in medieval Sicily and possibly also in Malta. The sect, as described by the author Luigi Natoli in his historic novel I Beati Paoli (written as a series under the pseudonym William Galt in 1909, then re-published as books in 1921 and 1949), resembles an order of chivalry fighting for the poor and the commoners. Whereas the novel is fictitious, Sicily's history bears some evidence that the Beati Paoli existed.

In 1071 feudalism was introduced in Sicily by its conqueror, the Norman lord Roger I de Hauteville. As the nobles started to exploit their feudal rights in the centuries to come, the Inquisition also got a foothold in Sicily. Any action by the commoners that could be interpreted by the state or the church as acts of treason or heresy was punishable by death. Such actions could be unauthorized assemblies or the formation of societies with goals other than supporting the current state/church regime.

In this environment, several orders and sects rose to existence – albeit a secret one. The Beati Paoli was allegedly formed to oppose both the church and the state, defending the commoners from infringements posed by the regime. They wore black hooded coats and operated at night from their refuge in the remains of the catacombs and underground channels of Palermo. It is not known when the Beati Paoli was established, but the novel by Luigi Natoli sets the scene in the first two decades of the 18th century, mainly in the town of Palermo. The origin of the name is also unknown, although some tie it to Francis of Paola, or "Beato Paola".

The Beati Paoli have the same connotation to many Sicilians as Robin Hood has to Northwestern Europeans. Today, traces of the Beati Paoli can be found in the Capo district of Palermo, where a square, a street and a restaurant bear their name. The Beati Paoli also have traditional significance for the Maltese. A Maltese old saying -"qala' xebgħa tal-beati pawli", meaning "he was beaten up badly (the Beati Paoli way)", may refer to this old sect . Some historians suggested that the Beati Paoli were real and that may have had roots also in Malta (circa the 15th till at least to the early 19th century) and that Malta may have been the sect's last stronghold. Today there is even a small restaurant in Valletta named Beati Paoli and a statue of Saint Francis of Paola is in Saint Elmo Street corner, also in Valletta. There are even rumors that the Beati Paoli still exist today, but whether the sect is still active or not remains a mystery . If so, that would make the Beati Paoli one of the most ancient and most elusive sects in Malta.

== I Beati Paoli (novel) ==
Written by prolific author and journalist Luigi Natoli, "I Beati Paoli" was at first released split into 239 episodes, published between 6 May 1909 and 2 January 1910 by the daily newspaper Il Giornale di Sicilia. Divided into four main parts, the historical fiction novel tells the story of the conflict between on the one hand an evil, greedy and ambitious Don Raimondo Albamonte, a Sicilian aristocrat, duke of Motta, and the main antagonist of the book, and, on the other hand, the sect of Beati Paoli, an amorphous, secret and when necessary violent organization of individuals committed to punish Don Raimondo for his crimes. In the words of scholar Rino Coluccello: "the action in the Beati Paoli is created by the conflict between good and bad characters". The novel is set in Sicily over a period of about 20 years, at the beginning of the 18th century. More precisely, the events narrated in the first part takes place in 1698. The second and third parts are set in the years 1713–1714, the fourth in 1718.

== Influence to the Mafia ==
In Sicily the Beati Paoli came to be seen – both in the popular imagination and in the ideology of mafia groups – as a proto-manifestation of the Mafia. Sicilian mafiosi love to portray themselves as the successors of the Beati Paoli, and Cosa Nostra likes to trace its origin to the sect. The novel is still alive in today's Mafia culture and its main characters are models of the ideal-typical sets of attitudes and behaviour of a mafioso. In one of their first confrontations in court, the Mafia boss of bosses Totò Riina and the turncoat (pentito) Gaspare Mutolo confronted each other referring to the characters of the novel. Another informant, Antonio Calderone, said he was told when he was initiated in Cosa Nostra that a mafioso should "follow the example of the Beati Paoli." The novel is dealt with extensively in Coluccello's book on Mafia's legitimisation. In Natoli's novel, the Beati Paoli act not out of economic interest but solely on moral grounds, for the sake of justice. As put by the main leader of the organization: "our justice is not written on any royal charter, it is written on our hearts: we follow it and we force others to follow it".

== Works cited ==
- Gambetta, Diego (1993). The Sicilian Mafia: The Business of Private Protection, London: Harvard University Press, ISBN 0-674-80742-1
- Paoli, Letizia (2003). Mafia Brotherhoods: Organized Crime, Italian Style, New York: Oxford University Press ISBN 0-19-515724-9
- Paoli, Letizia (2004). "Organised Crime in Italy: Mafia and Illegal Markets – Exception and Normality" in Cyrille Fijnaut & Letizia Paoli (eds). Organised Crime in Europe: Concepts, Patterns and Control Policies in the European Union and Beyond. The Netherlands; Norwell, MA: Springer. ISBN 1-4020-2615-3
- Charles William Heckethorn, The Secret Societies of All Ages and Countries, 1897, pages 169-171
