= Monument to the Military Endeavour of Polish Americans =

Monument in Warsaw, Poland

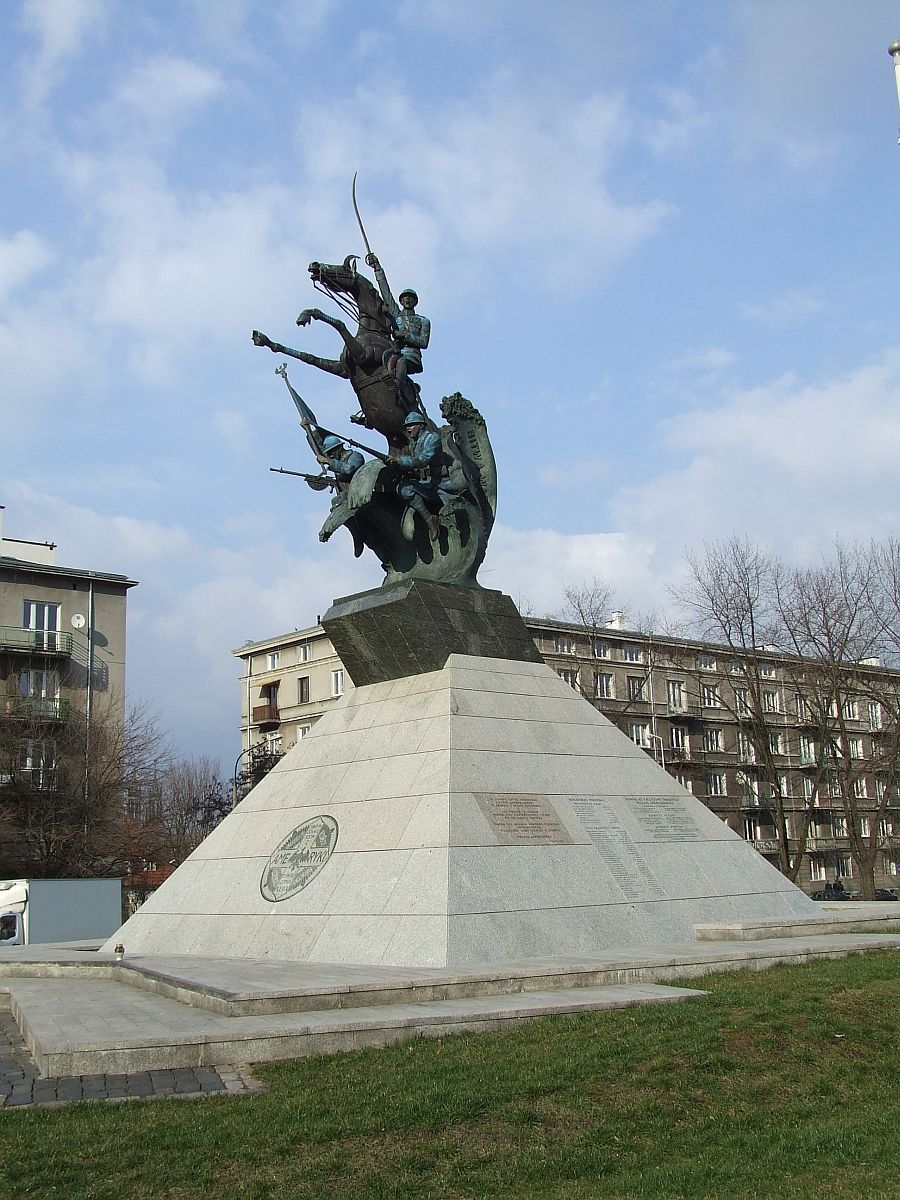
- The monument in 2008.
- Interactive map of Monument to the Military Endeavour of Polish Americans
- Location: Grunwald Square, Warsaw, Poland
- Coordinates: 52°15′47.02″N 20°58′53.22″E
- Designer: Baltazar Brukalski; Andrzej Pityński
- Type: Sculpture
- Opening date: 14 August 1998
- Dedicated to: Blue Army

The Monument to the Military Endeavour of Polish Americans, (Note: Polish: Pomnik Czynu Zbrojnego Polonii Amerykańskiej) also known as the Haller's Soldiers Monument, (Note: Polish: Pomnik Hallerczyków) is a monument in Warsaw, Poland, placed at the Grunwald Square, near the crossing of Polish Army Avenue and Wyspiańskiego Street. It was made by Baltazar Brukalski and Andrzej Pityński, and unveiled on 14 August 1998. The monument is dedicated to the Polish American and Polish Canadian soldiers who served in the Blue Army during the First World War, the Polish–Ukrainian War, and the Polish–Soviet War.

== History ==
The monument was financed by the Polish Army Veterans' Association in America and financed by the Józef Piłsudski Polish Weaponry Tradition Association (Polish: Stowarzyszenie Tradycji Oręża Polskiego im. Józefa Piłsudskiego). It was designed by Baltazar Brukalski and Andrzej Pityński, and unveiled on 14 August 1998 at the Grunwald Square in Warsaw.

== Characteristics ==
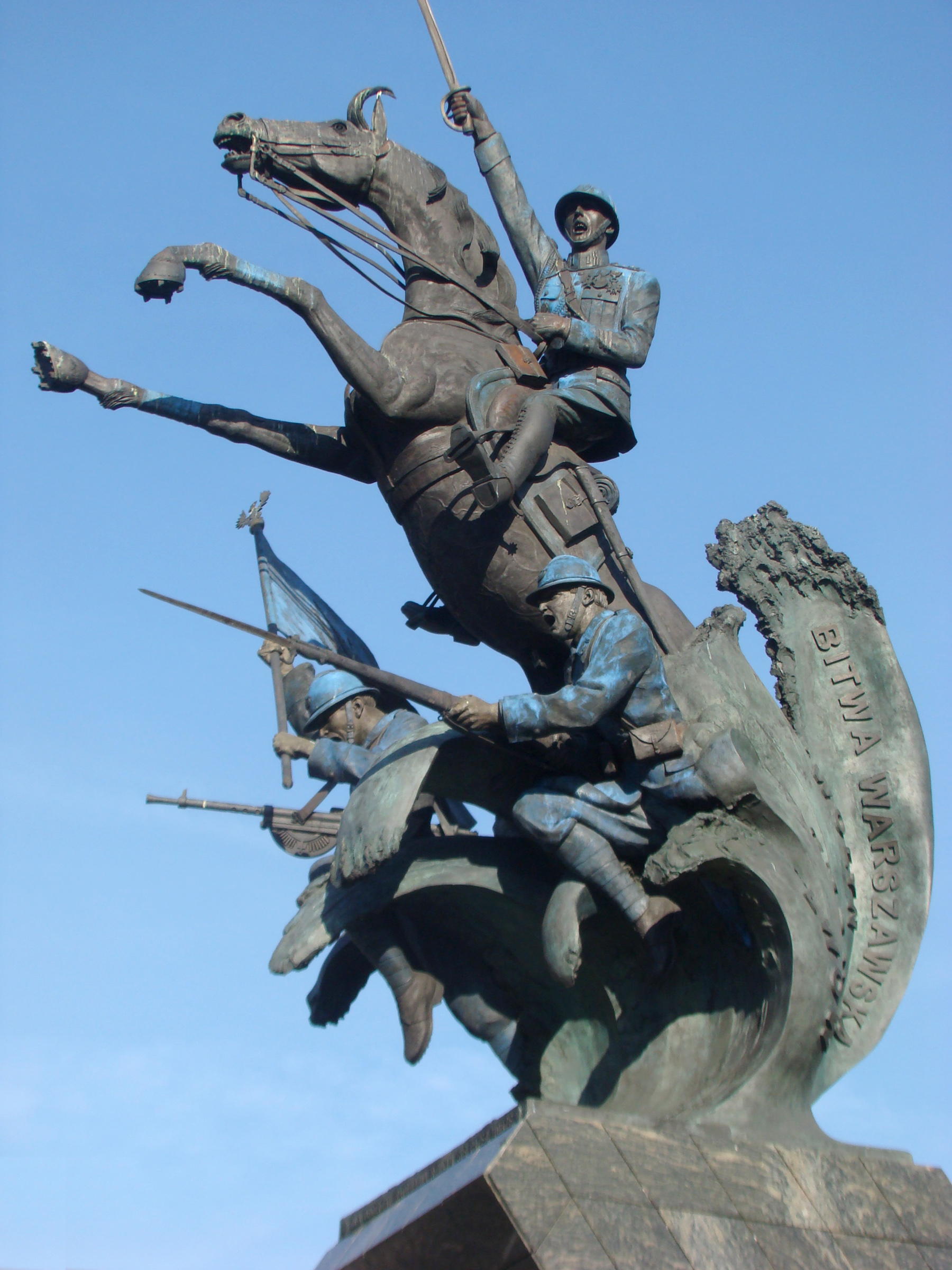
The sculpture of the monument.

The monument is placed at the Grunwald Square, near the crossing of Polish Army Avenue and Wyspiańskiego Street in Warsaw. It was dedicated to the Polish American and Polish Canadian soldiers who served in the Blue Army during the First World War.

The monument consists of a sculpture that depicts a three soldiers of the Blue Army running to a battle, while emerging from a large ocean wave, symbolising their American origin. The one in the middle is riding on a horse and holding a sabre. The remaining soldiers are on foot, with the one if the right holding firearm, and the one on the left, a standard depicting Polish ealge. Their uniforms and standard are painted blue. At the bottom of a sculpture is an inscription that reads "Dla ojczyzny ratownia, rzucim się przez morze", which translates from Polish to "To save our homeland, we shall attack from across the sea". It refers to the line from the national anthem "Poland Is Not Yet Lost", that reads "Dla ojczyzny ratownia, wrócim się przez morze" ("To save our homeland, we shall return from across the sea").

The sculpture is placed on a pedestal in a shape of a pyramid, that is covered in tiles. At the front is an engraving depicting the Cross of Polish Soldiers from America. On its right side is placed a plaque with the inscription, which reads:

Polish inspiration:
Na chwałę czynu zbrojnego Polonii Amerykańskiej w okresie I wojny światowej i jej wkład w dzieło odzyskania niepodległości Polski po 123 latach niewoli pomnik ten ofiaruje narodowi polskiemu Stowarzyszenie Weteranów Armii Polskiej w Ameryce i Polonia Amerykańska.

English translation:
In honour of the endeavour of Polish Americans during World War I, and their contribution in restoring independence of Poland after 123 years of captivity, this monument is dedicated to the Polish nation by the Polish Army Veterans' Association in America, and Polish Americans.

== Gallery ==
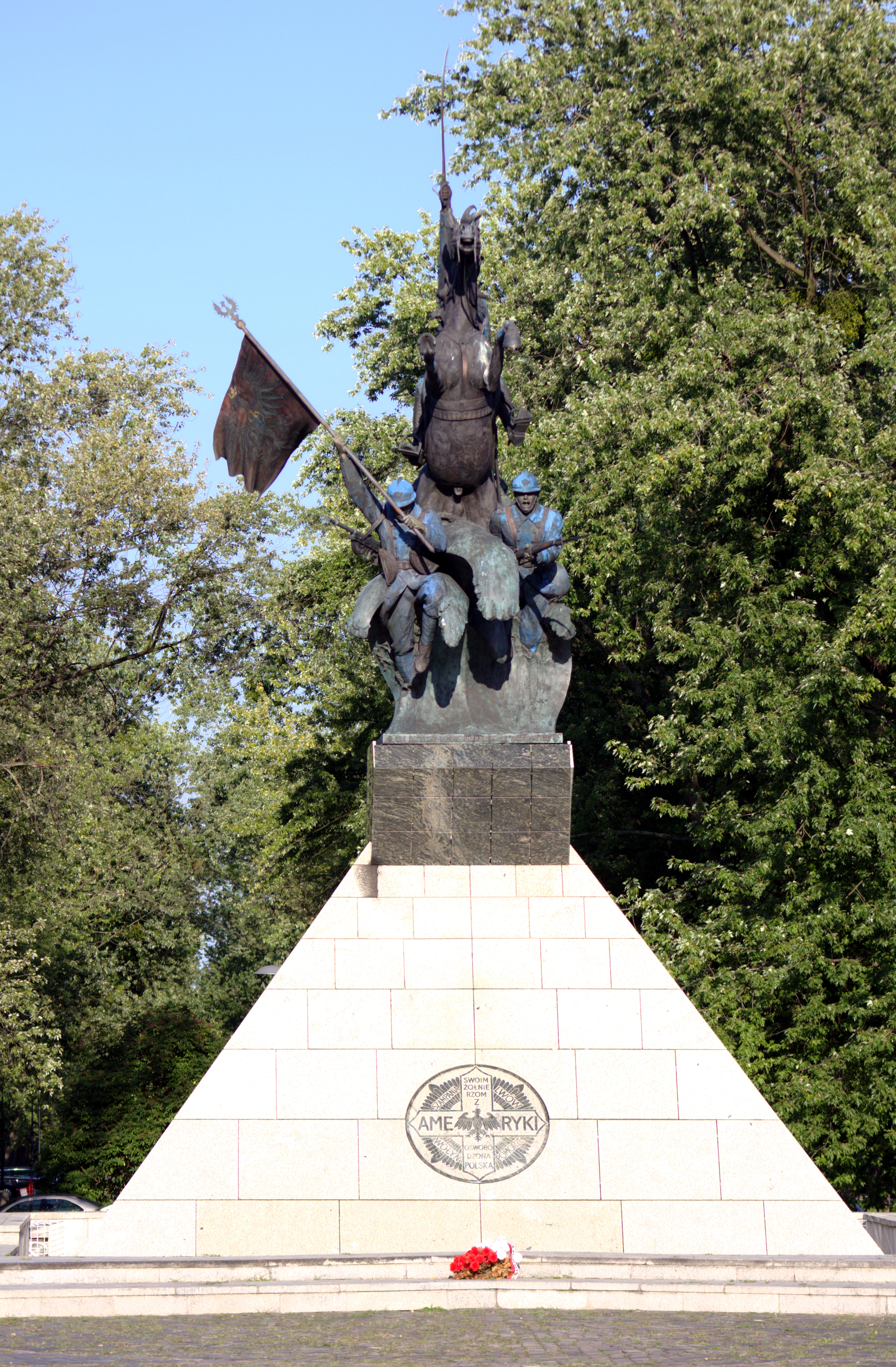
The monument as seen from the front.

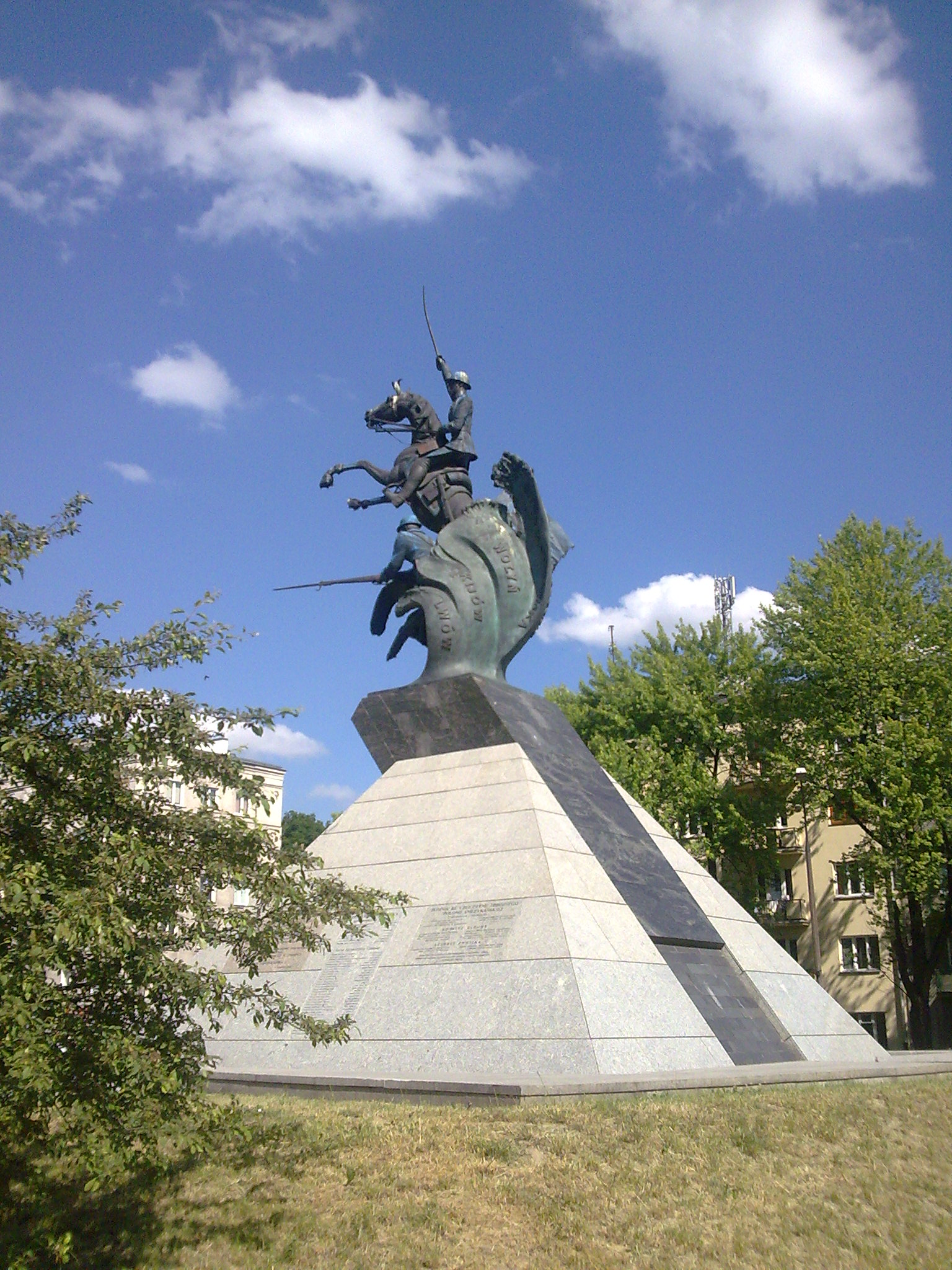
Monument as seen from the back.

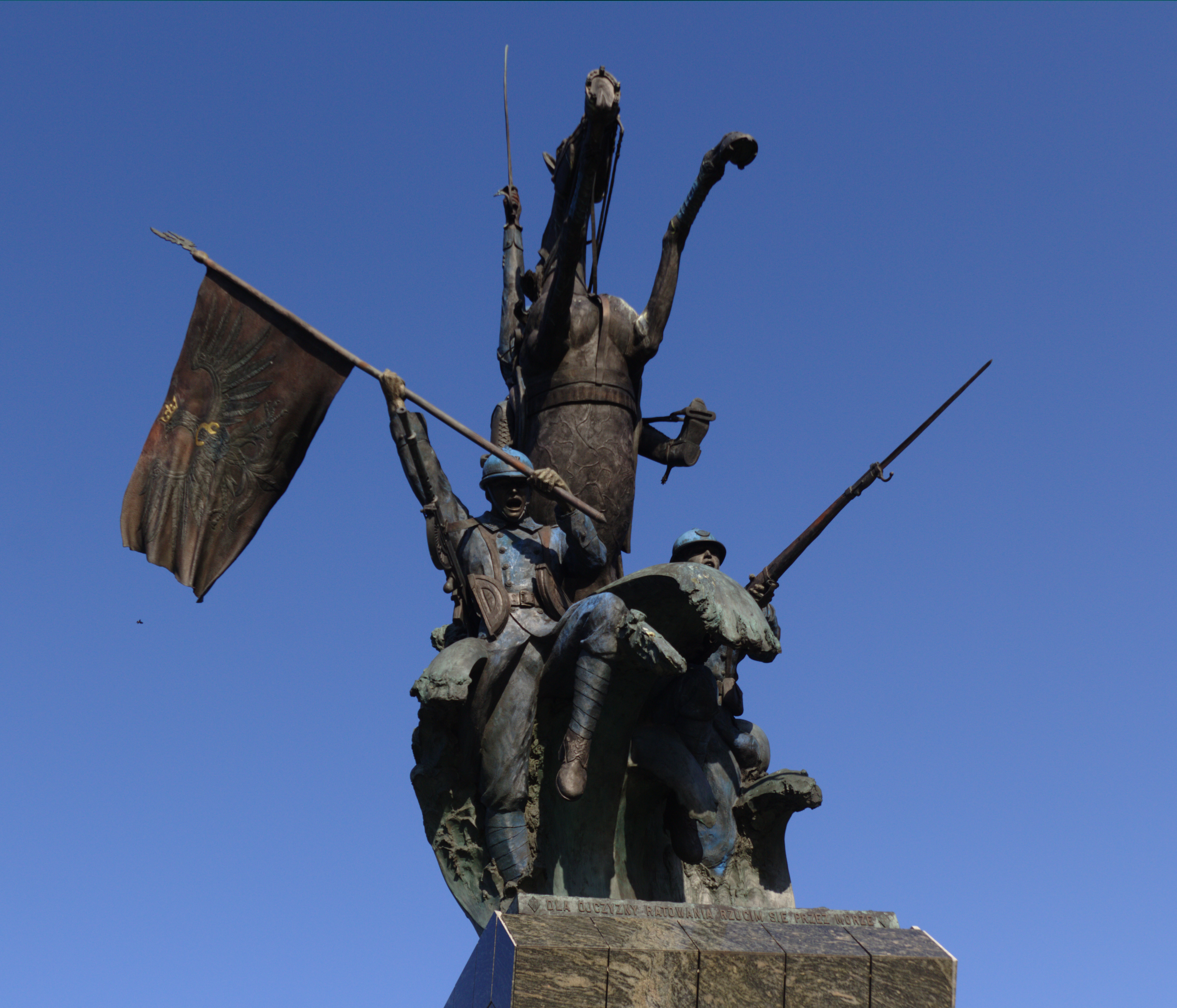
The sculpture.

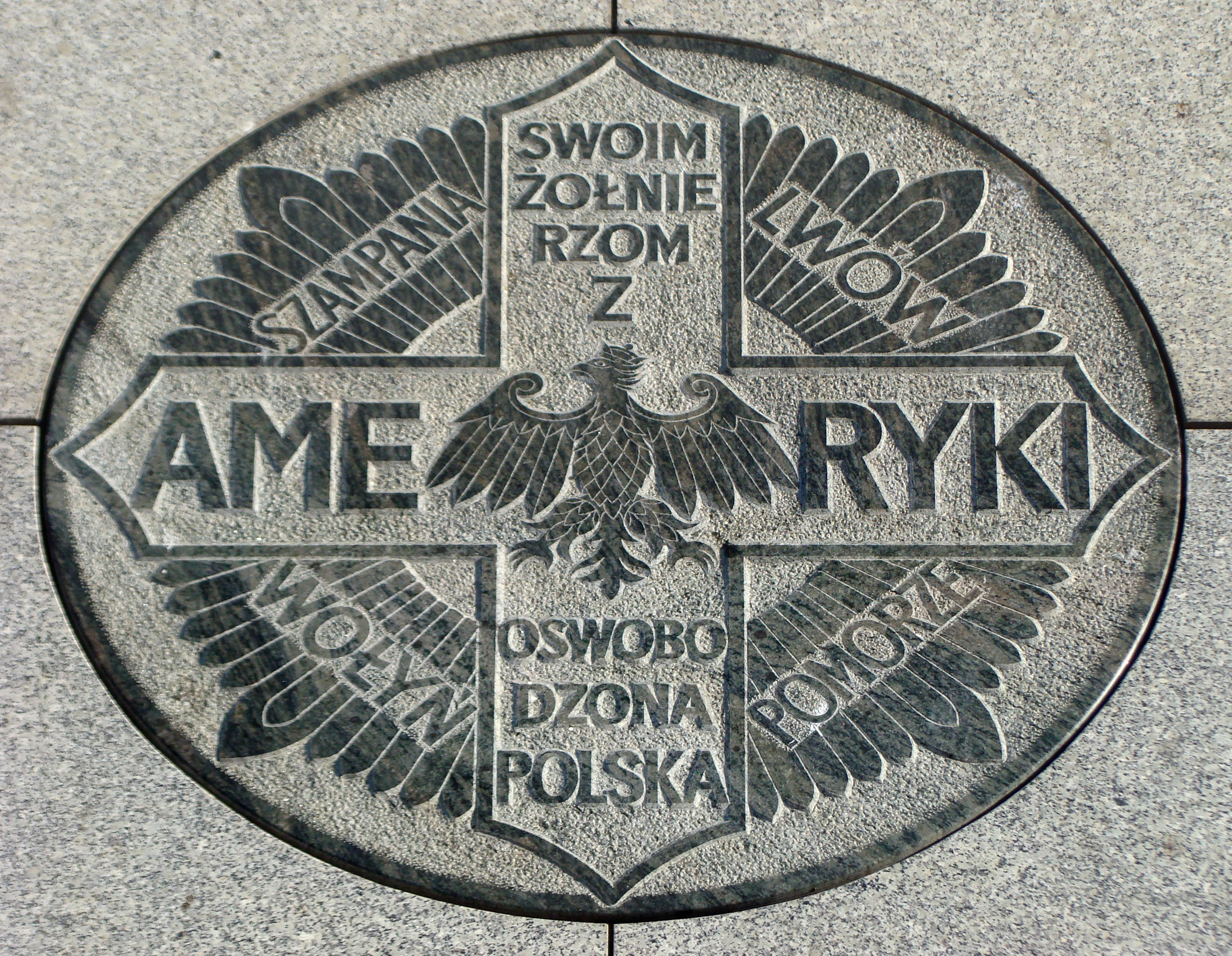
The engraving of the Cross of Polish Soldiers from America.
