= Katyń Memorial =

Katyń Memorial may refer to:

- Katyń Memorial (Jersey City), in Jersey City, New Jersey
- Katyń Memorial (Niles, Illinois) in Niles, Illinois
- National Katyń Memorial, in Baltimore, Maryland

== See also ==
- List of Katyn massacre memorials
