= Katyn =

Katyn may refer to:

- Katyn massacre, a mass execution of Polish generals, military commanders and intelligentsia in 1940 by Soviet organization NKVD
- Katyń (film), a 2007 Polish film about the Katyń massacre directed by Andrzej Wajda
- Katyn (rural locality), a selo in Smolensk Oblast, Russia, and the site of the Katyn massacre
- Katyń Memorial (Jersey City), Jersey City, New Jersey, dedicated to the victims of the Katyn massacre
- Katyn war cemetery, a Polish military cemetery in the village of Katyn, Smolensk Oblast, Russia
- National Katyń Memorial, Baltimore, Maryland, dedicated to the victims of the Katyn massacre

== See also ==
- Khatyn, a village in Belarus, in Lahojsk district, Minsk Voblast, whose population was massacred in 1943
