= Polish American Immigration and Relief Committee =

The Polish American Immigration and Relief Committee, or PAIRC, was formed in 1946 by Monsignor Feliks Burant. The purpose of this organization was to help create relief for the Polish refugees that were in Western Europe and helping them immigrate to the western countries.

== History ==
Reverend Monsignor Feliks Burant was a member of the Polish Roman Alliance, Polish Roman Catholic Union of America, the Polish Legion of American Veterans, and other such organizations. After the start of World War II and the involvement of America into the war, he then helped form a new organization with the help all of the positions that he had held within the Polish community. It was not until the year 1946 that he had come up with the idea of PAIRC to help the refugees. The first meeting help by Reverend Burant was held in December 1946, and they came up with these three basic goals for the organization.

- To begin working within preexisting means to help Polish refugees find jobs and apartments, placing children in schools, and providing them clothing, medical care, English lessons, and professional training.
- To obtain from the American Relief for Poland whatever financial aid is necessary to help.
- To obtain patronage from the National Catholic Welfare Conference.

PAIRC had received funds from various other organizations which lead up to around $66,500 in the months from February 1947 to October 1948. In the years from 1948 to 1949 they had received around $4,000 a month for helping the Polish immigrants.

As this organization continued to grow they had sure that each Polish immigrant that entered received a hot meal and a bed to sleep in upon arrival. But with the number of people that were coming over they had proposed a new tactic of organizing professional courses to help ease any of the uncertainty of any of the new immigrants that came over. As a result, this strengthen the Polish ethnic group that was beginning to form in the United States.

On February 6, 1951, an agreement was signed between the National Catholic Welfare Conference, the War Relief Services, and PAIRC; which was then called the American Commission for the Relief of Polish Immigrants. This allowed for the following procedures:

- The American Commission for the Relief of Polish Immigrants is engaged in obtaining home and job assurances in the United States for displaced persons in Europe, the Polish soldiers in England, and Polish refugees and displaced persons eligible under the Displaced Persons Act.
- Assurances of homes and jobs obtained by the American Commission for the Relief of Polish Immigrants, are submitted to War Relief Services for processing, and the American Personal of War Relief Services, NCWC in Europe, England, and other countries are responsible for selection and process.
- Here in the United States the Commission assists War Relief Services, NCWC in the pier operation and with many welfare and relief activities in early adjustment period of displaced persons and refugees.

This had set the PAIRC to become a real asset to immigration within the United States, as they were even approved by NCWC, and this partnership would continue until the 1990s.

== Books ==
- Cisek, Janusz (2006). Polish Refugees and the Polish American Immigration and Relief Committee. McFarland & Company, Inc. ISBN 978-0-7864-2294-4.
- Lukas, Richard (1982). PBitter legacy: Polish-American relations in the wake of World War II. University Press of Kentucky. ISBN 978-0-8131-9273-4.
