= Grunwald Square =

Grunwald Square may refer to several places in Poland:

- Grunwald Square (Warsaw), a square in Warsaw
- Grunwald Square (town square in Wrocław), a square in Wrocław
- Grunwald Square (neighbourhood), a neighbourhood of Wrocław
- Grunwald Square (Szczecin), a square in Szczecin
