= Antoni Mroczkowski =

Polish fighter pilot and officer (1896–1970)

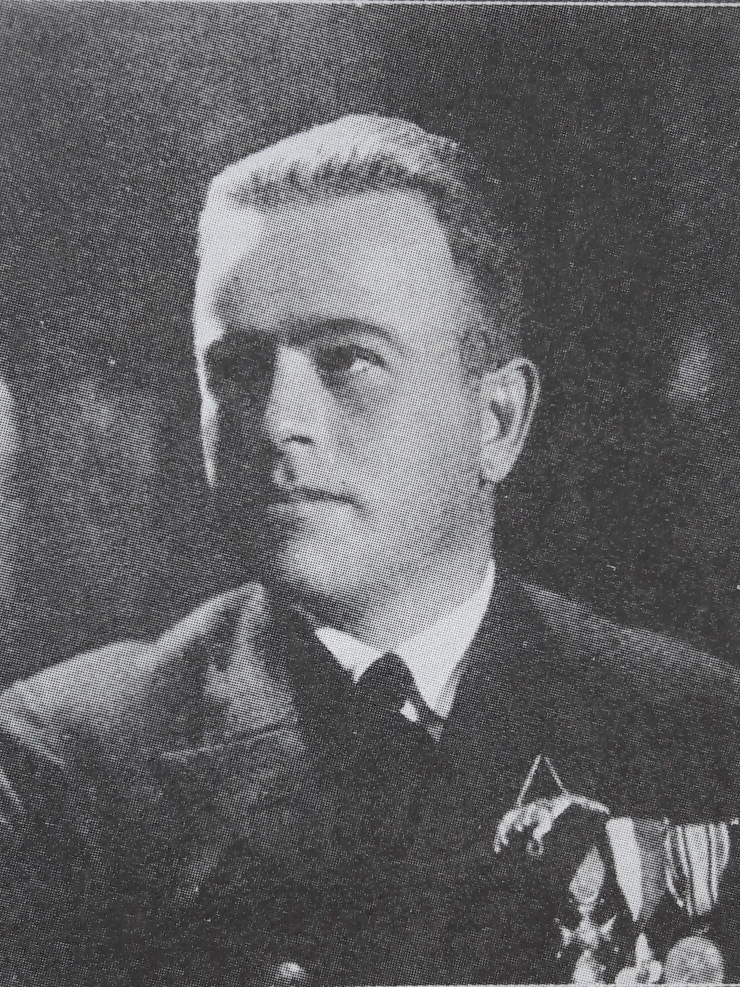
- Antoni Mroczkowski, lieutenant pilot, commander of the 19th Fighter Squadron
- Born: 29 April 1896; Odessa, Russian Empire(now Ukraine)
- Died: 26 December 1970 (aged 74); Warsaw, People's Republic of Poland
- Military career
- Allegiance: Russian Empire; Poland
- Branch: Imperial Russian Air Force; Polish Air Force
- Rank: Kapitan
- Units: 24th Air Corps, 19th Fighter escadrille
- Conflicts: World War I Polish–Soviet War
- Awards: Virtuti Militari, Order of Polonia Restituta, Cross of Independence, Medal of the 10th Anniversary of People's Poland
- Other work: Test pilot

Antoni Mroczkowski was a Polish ace pilot in the Imperial Russian Air Force during the World War I with at least 5 confirmed kills.

== Biography ==
In August 1914 Antoni Mroczkowski started to serve in the Imperial Russian Army. In 1915 he completed pilot training in Sevastopol. From 1915 to 1917 he flew in the 24th Air corps. He scored his first victory on an Albatros near Tuchyn in Volhynia. He was wounded two times, and was also shot down in error by Russian artillery. In 1917 he was promoted to captain.

In Odessa, Mroczkowski joined a Polish Air Force unit and from 1919 he served in an escadrille attached to the 10th Infantry Division. He worked as instructor in a flying school in Warsaw, then he was a test pilot in Centralne Warsztaty Lotnicze. In 1920 he was assigned to the 19th Fighter Escadrille. In 1921 Morczkowski was given an indefinite leave of absence. Later he returned to his profession as a test pilot in Plage i Laśkiewicz in Lublin. He was fired for participation in a strike.

In 1940 Mroczkowski reached Great Britain after the Fall of France. In the UK he flew multi-engine airplanes. Due to his age he was transferred to the ground service.

Mroczkowski came back in Poland in 1946. During his career he flew over 8000 hours on 85 different aircraft.

Antoni Mroczkowski died in Warsaw on 26 December 1970, at age 74.

== Awards ==
Virtuti Militari, Silver Cross
Order of Polonia Restituta, Knight's Cross
Cross of Independence
Cross of Polish Soldiers from America
Commemorative Medal for the War of 1918–1921
Medal of the 10th Anniversary of People's Poland
Bronze Medal of Merit for National Defence
Order of Saint Anna, 4th Class (Russian Empire)
