= List of Katyn massacre memorials =

Katyn massacre memorials commemorate the 1940 Katyn massacre by the Soviet NKVD.

== Australia ==
Outside the Dom Polski Centre in Adelaide, Australia, there exists a monument to commemorate both the victims of the Katyn massacre and the Polish soldiers killed in WWII.

== Austria ==
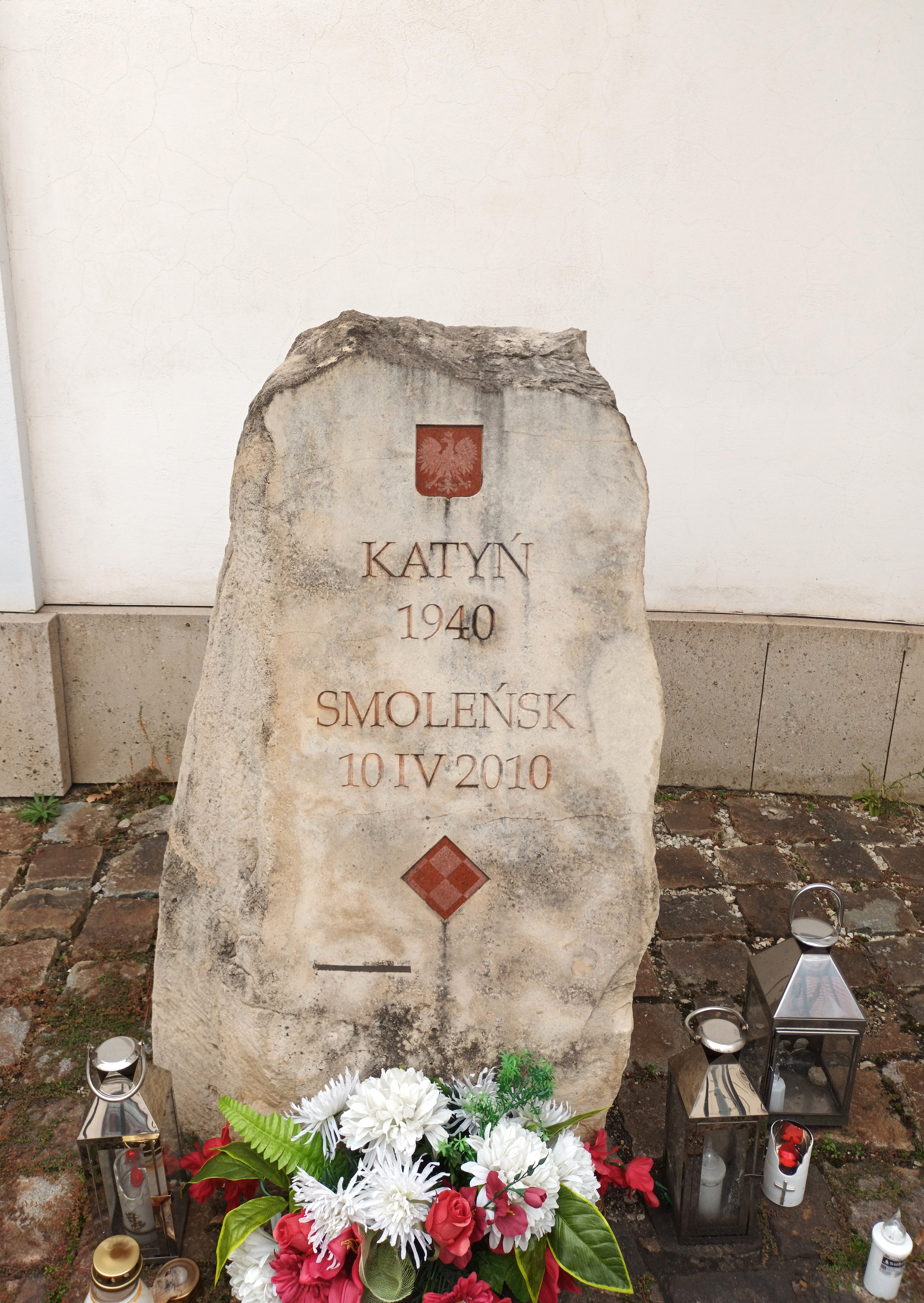
Katyn Memorial, Vienna

In front of Gardekirche in Vienna, Austria, there is a monument both to Katyn and Smolensk Polish tragedies.

== Canada ==
In Canada, a large metal sculpture has been erected in the Polish community of Roncesvalles in Toronto, to commemorate the killings. The monument is found at Beaty Boulevard Parkette.

== Hungary ==
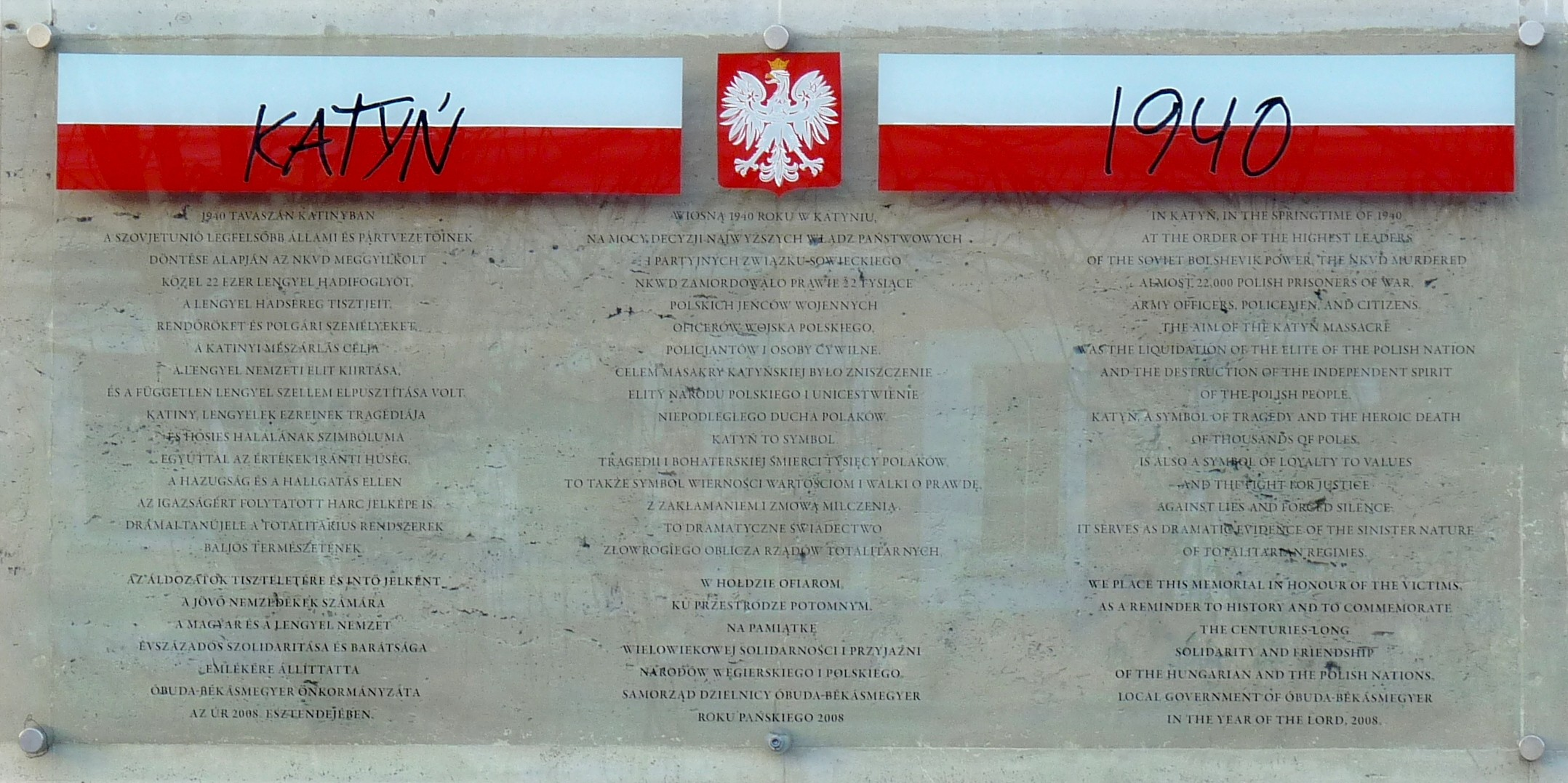
Katyn memorial plaque Budapest

In 2008 there was a plaque erected at the Árpád Gimnázium, Grammar Schools wall at Budapest for commemorate the massacre.

== Poland ==
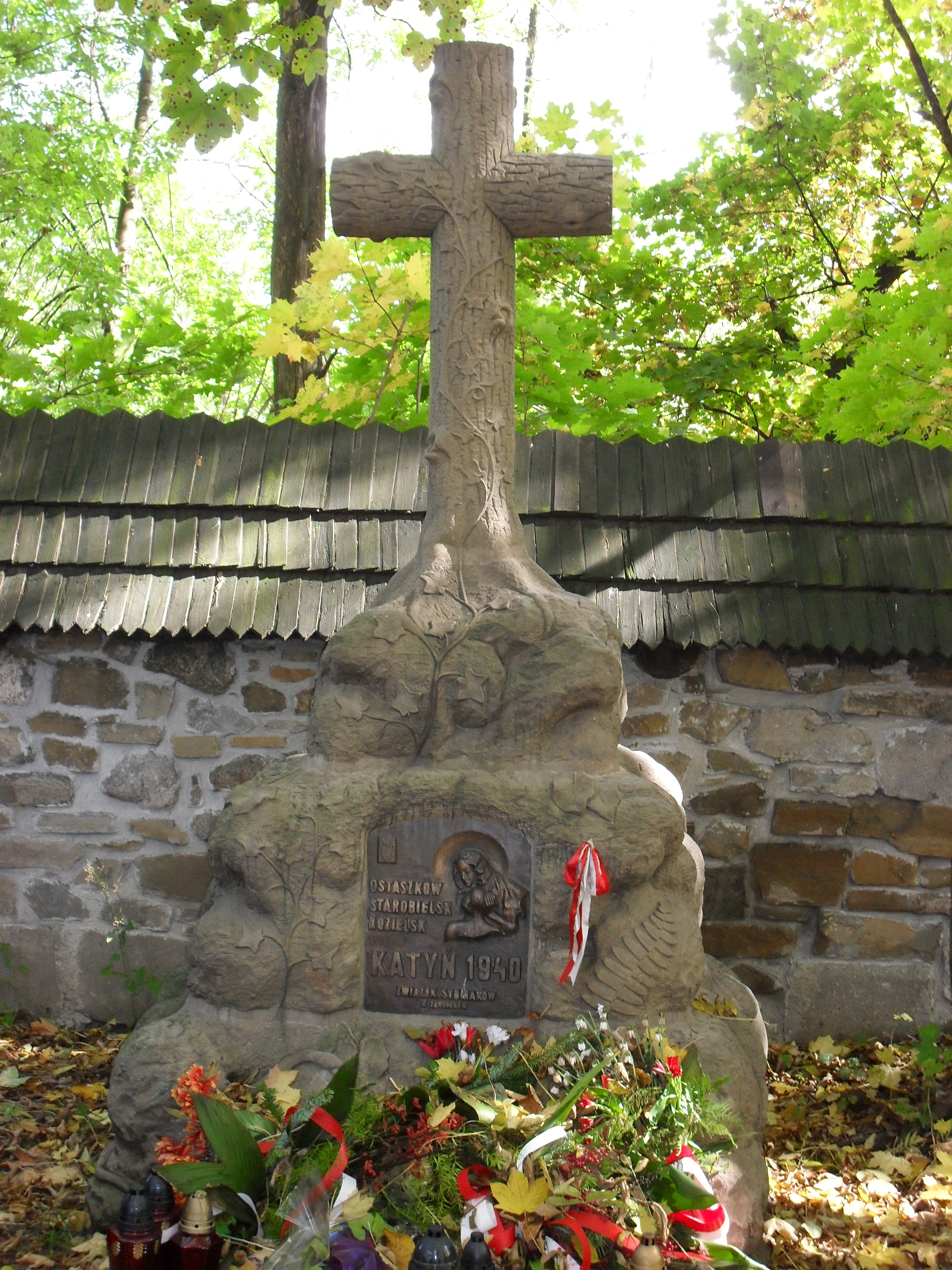
Katyn Memorial, Pęksów Brzyzek cemetery, Zakopane, Poland

Many cities in Poland now have memorials to the massacre in public spaces as well as within churches and cemeteries. For example, in Wrocław, a composition by Polish sculptor Tadeusz Tchórzewski is dedicated to the Katyn victims. Unveiled in 2000, it is in a park east of the city's centre, near the Racławice Panorama building. It shows the 'Matron of the Homeland' despairing over a dead soldier, while on a higher plinth the angel of death looms over, leaning forward on a sword. There is also the Katyn-Kharkiv-Mednoye memorial in Świętokrzyskie Mountains, Poland.

== Russia ==
- In 2000, the memorial at the Katyn war cemetery was opened in Russia. Previously, the site featured a monument with a false dedication to the "victims of the Hitlerites".
- "[T]wo plaques in Tver commemorating the Katyn massacre -- one in Russian, the other in Polish -- were placed on the façade of Tver State Medical University in 1991 and 1992 on the orders of the Tver City Council." However, these commemorations were removed in May, 2020 due to illegitimate claims that the plaque's records were false. It is speculated that the removal of the plaques, is part of a narrative of "rewriting history" or "downplaying Stalin's crimes" promoted under current president Vladimir Putin.

== South Africa ==
In South Africa, a memorial in Johannesburg commemorates the victims of Katyn, as well as South African and Polish airmen who flew missions from southern Italy to Poland to drop supplies over Warsaw during the Warsaw Uprising.

== Ukraine ==
In Ukraine, a memorial complex was erected to honor the over 4300 officer victims of the Katyń massacre killed in Pyatykhatky, 14 kilometres/8.7 miles north of Kharkiv in Ukraine; the complex lies in a corner of a former resort home for NKVD officers. Children had discovered hundreds of Polish officer buttons whilst playing on the site.

== United Kingdom ==
Katyn memorial in Cannock Chase, Staffordshire

Katyn memorial at the Southern Cemetery in Manchester

There are several Katyn memorials in the UK, the best known of which was unveiled on 18 September 1976 at Gunnersbury Cemetery in London, amid considerable controversy. During the period of the Cold War, successive British governments objected to plans by the UK's Polish community to build a major monument to commemorate the massacre. The Soviet Union did not want Katyn to be remembered, and put pressure on Britain to prevent the creation of the monument. As a result, the construction of the monument was delayed for many years. After the local community had finally secured the right to build the monument, no official government representative was present at the opening ceremony (although some politicians did attend the event unofficially).

Another memorial in the UK was erected three years later, in 1979, in Cannock Chase, Staffordshire. A memorial tablet by Ronald Sims has also been installed in the Airmen's Chapel within Southwell Minster in Nottinghamshire (there is a large Polish community in the county and each year a service is held to remember the massacre). In 1985, a memorial by Alexander Klecki was erected at Clifton Cathedral by the Polish community in Bristol. There is also a Katyn memorial in Manchester's Southern Cemetery, unveiled in 1990, on one of the first occasions the British Government publicly acknowledged Katyn was a Soviet, rather than Nazi, war atrocity.

== United States ==
- A golden statue known as the National Katyn Massacre Memorial is in Baltimore, Maryland, on Aliceanna Street at Inner Harbor East.
- Polish-Americans in Detroit erected a small white-stone memorial in the form of a cross with a plaque at the St. Albertus Roman Catholic Church.
- The Katyn Forest Massacre Memorial by Marian Owczarski (1985) located at Our Lady of Orchard Lake church in Orchard Lake, Michigan.
- A statue, the Katyń Memorial, commemorating the massacre is at Exchange Place on the Hudson River in Jersey City, New Jersey.
- Other memorial statues are in Doylestown, Pennsylvania and Niles, Illinois.
