= Grunwald Square (Warsaw) =

Urban square in Warsaw, Poland

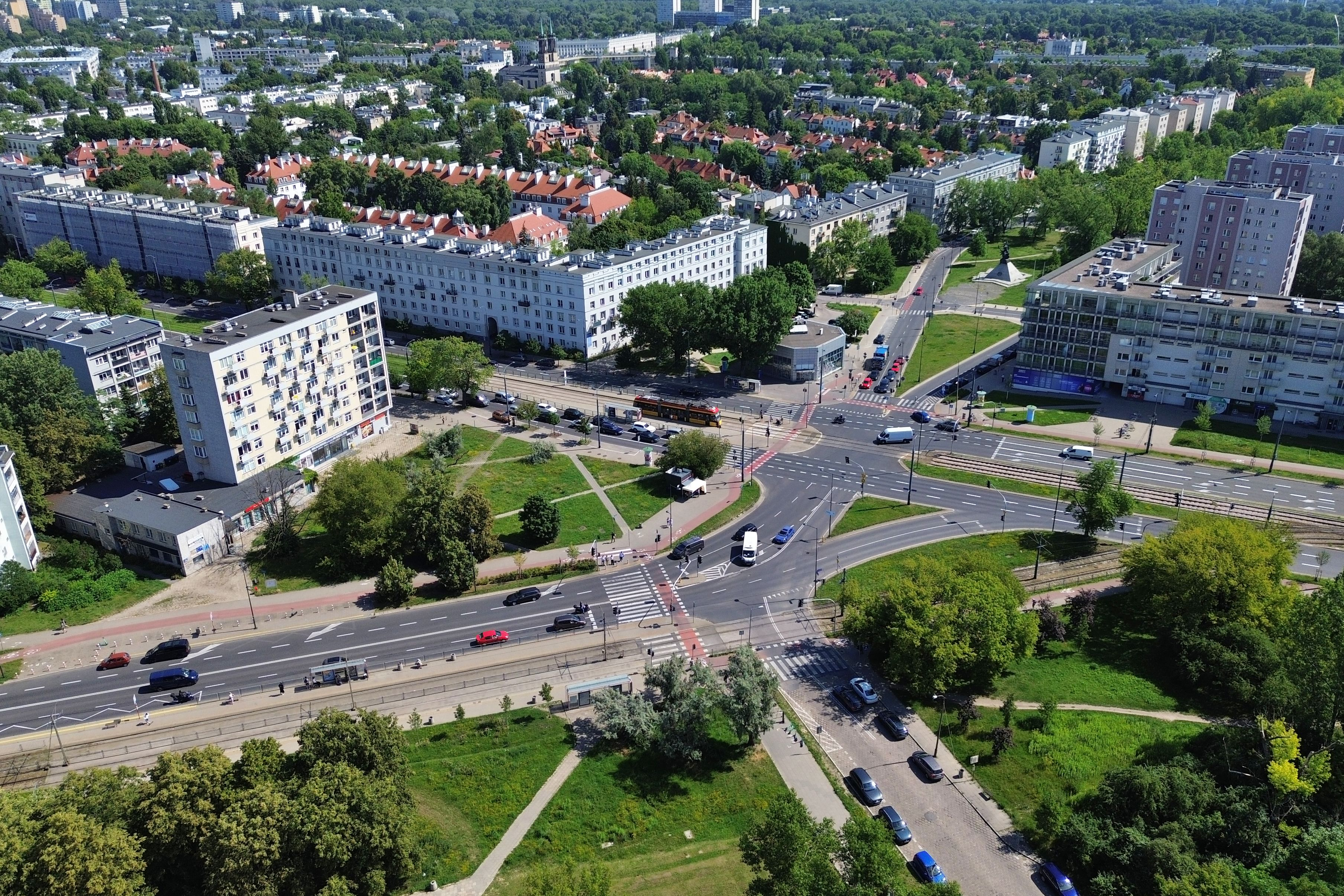
- Grunwald Square in 2024

- Location within Warsaw
- Location: Warsaw, Poland
- Coordinates: 52°15′44.2″N 20°58′47.0″E
- North: Popiełuszki Street
- East: Wojska Polskiego Avenue
- South: Jana Pawła II Avenue
- West: Broniewskiego Street; Matysiakówny Street.

Construction
- Completion: 1930s

Other
- Designer: Antoni Jawornicki; Józef Jankowski

Grunwald Square (Polish pronunciation: [ˈɡrun.valt]; Polish: Plac Grunwaldzki) is an urban square in Warsaw, Poland. It is located in the district of Żoliborz, at the crossing of Broniewskiego Street, Jana Pawła II Avenue, Popiełuszki Street, Wojska Polskiego Avenue, and Matysiakówny Street.

== Name ==
The square was named in 1926 after the village of Grunwald in Warmian–Masurian Voivodeship, Poland, which on 15 July 1410, was the site of the Battle of Grunwald, that ended in a decisive Polish–Lithuanian victory.

== History ==
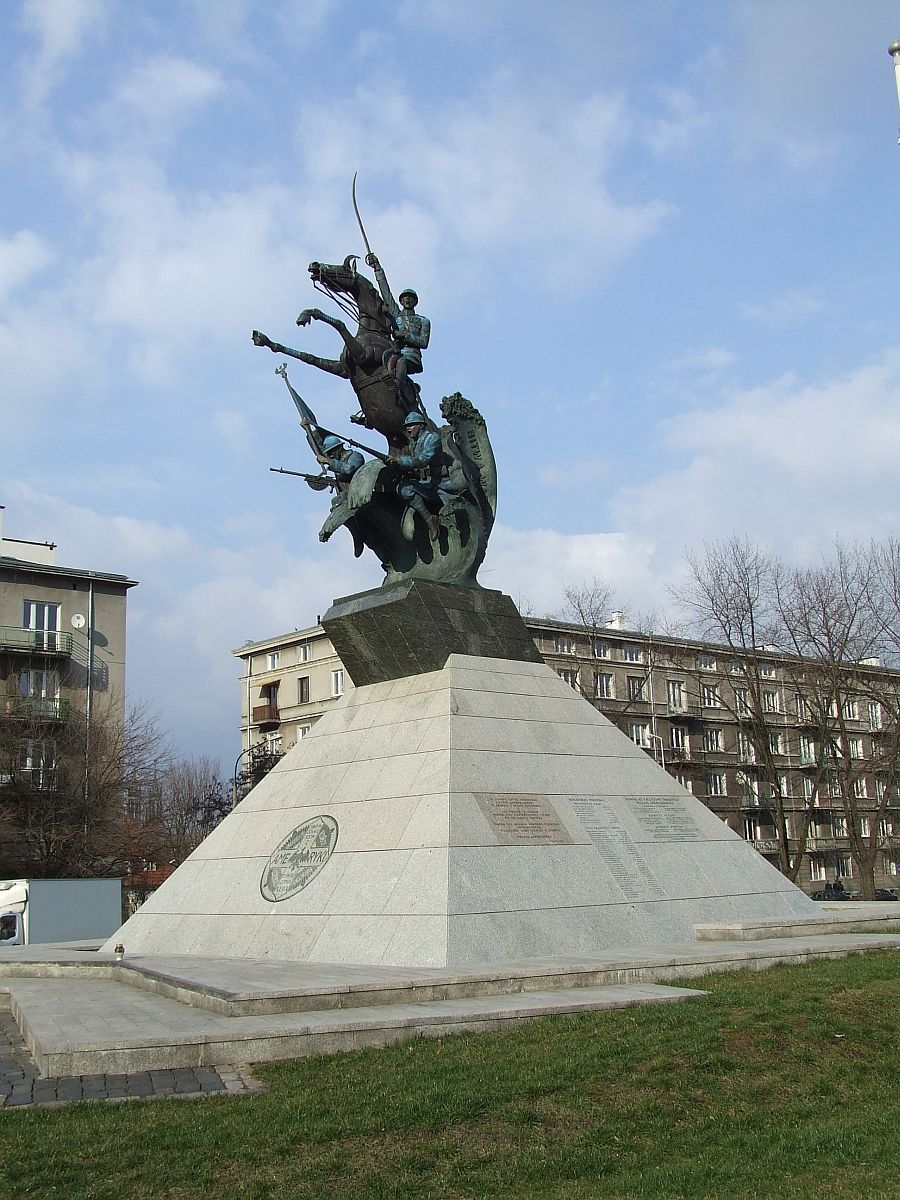
Monument to the Military Endeavour of Polish Americans

Grunwald Square was designed between 1920 and 1922, as part of the planning road system near Warsaw Citadel. Its authors were Antoni Jawornicki and Józef Jankowski. It was originally envisioned as a half-circle with the five-way crossing of newly planned streets, then named Marynarki, Lotnictwa, Kawalerii, and Artylerii. The square and nearby roads began construction in the 1930s, however, the works on the project were halted before its full completion.

== Characteristics ==
Grunwald Square is located at the crossing of Broniewskiego Street, Jana Pawła II Avenue, Popiełuszki Street, Wojska Polskiego Avenue, and Matysiakówny Street.

At the square, there is the Monument to the Military Endeavour of Polish Americans made by Baltazar Brukalski and Andrzej Pityński, unveiled on 14 August 1998. It was proposed by the Polish Army Veterans' Association in America, and made by Baltazar Brukalski and Andrzej Pityński. It is dedicated to the Polish American and Polish Canadian soldiers who served in the Blue Army during the First World War, the Polish–Ukrainian War, and the Polish–Soviet War.
