= Polish Combatants' Association (United States) =

Polish Combatants' Association (Stowarzyszenie Polskich Kombatantów, SPK)
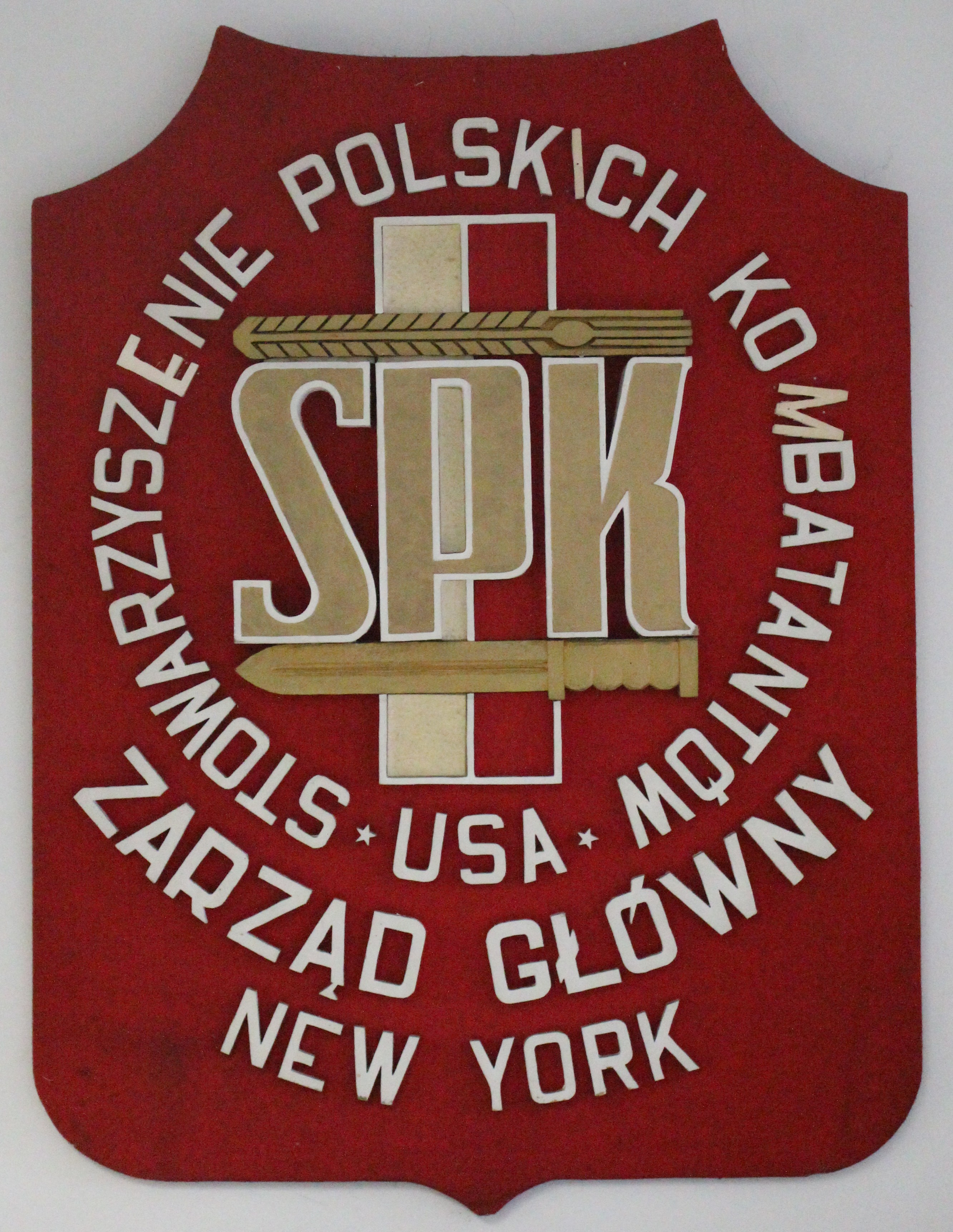
- Established: 1952-53
- President: Janusz Krzyżanowski
- Address: 180 Second Avenue; New York, NY 10003
- Location: New York City, United States of America
- Dissolved: 2012

The Polish Combatants' Association (pl. Stowarzyszenie Polskich Kombatantów w Stanach Zjednoczonych, SPK), organized in 1952, formally founded a year later, and terminated in 2012, was a Polish-American association for veterans of the Polish Armed Forces in the West during World War II. It was a member of the World Federation of Polish Combatants Association, an umbrella organization that included similar associations from other countries. The Association's President Janusz Krzyżanowski currently serves as the chairman of its liquidation committee, working to create a scholarly source of information about the SPK.

== History and activity ==
The Association was created during a November 1952 convention, but scattered groups of Polish combatants in the United States existed prior to the date. Most of the future members of the SPK arrived in the U.S. after the U.S. Congress passed a 1948 law, amended in 1950, which allowed the immigration of Polish soldiers who were demobilized in Great Britain.

The bulk of the SPK members were combatants of the Polish Armed Forces in the West, which formed from the so-called "soldiers' emigration" following the September Campaign of 1939. The SPK, however, did not refer to its members as "immigrants." Some had left Poland to fight alongside the French and then, after the fall of France, the British. Others were arrested by the NKVD, miraculously avoided being murdered in the Katyn Massacre and were drafted into the Anders Army created on Soviet soil. Others still came from the First Polish Mechanized Division fighting in Germany, Nazi concentration camps and the Home Army. According to some estimates, the Polish Armed Forces in the West counted quarter of a million troops and were the third largest Allied contingent in West by the end of the war, after those of the U.S. and the U.K.

Most of the Polish combatants from the eastern borderlands of Poland, lost to the Soviet Union in 1945, were unable to return home after the hostilities had ended. Many were also wary of the communist regime installed in Warsaw after the treaty of Yalta and its persecution of Home Army soldiers. They stayed in the West and continue the fight for free Poland if only by their presence and words.

One of the accomplishments of the SPK was influencing the American Congress to pass the Polish Veterans Rights Legislation, signed into law by President Gerald Ford in 1976, which gave Polish veterans the privilege of treatment in American veteran hospitals.

The SPK published the quarterly Kombatant w Ameryce, which informed members of organizational matters as well as the misery of the Polish Nation under communism and international events.

The veterans who belonged to the SPK maintained the graves of Polish soldiers who fell on the European battlefields, located in Italy, France, Belgium and the Netherlands, among others. SPK members are also buried on established section in the cemetery of American Częstochowa of Doylestown, Pennsylvania.

The SPK commemorated American and Polish national holidays, including those forbidden in the Polish People's Republic, for example that commemorating the Polish victory over the Bolsheviks. Members participated in radio broadcasts, helped establish Polish Saturday schools, assisted one another financially, cooperated with Polish and American scouts.

Some SPK veterans lived to see Poland regain independence in 1989 after the fall of communism and to participate in the 1992 Victory Parade in Warsaw. Some also helped and witnessed Poland's accession to NATO in 1999.

Due to a shrinking membership, the SPK was officially terminated during a 2012 convention. SPK President Janusz Krzyżanowski became the chairman of the liquidation committee which includes also Czesław Gieniewski, Michał Madejski and Jerzy Żmidziński. The committee currently sorts, organizes and describes the records of the Association.

== Aims ==
The convention of the SPK that took place in 1953 set up the following aims:

- Strengthening of ties between members by cultivating traditions of fighting for Polish independence and against the communist Warsaw regime;
- Establishing contact with American veterans organizations who fought for similar aims;
- Winning rights and privileges for Polish veterans similar to those to which American veterans are entitled;
- Helping the crippled and disabled Polish combatants in less affluent countries;
- Maintaining Polish graves of those fallen on the European battlefields.

== See also ==
- Polish Army Veterans' Association in America
- Polish Legion of American Veterans
