= Patriot (sculpture) =

Coordinates: 50°34′33″N 22°03′38″E

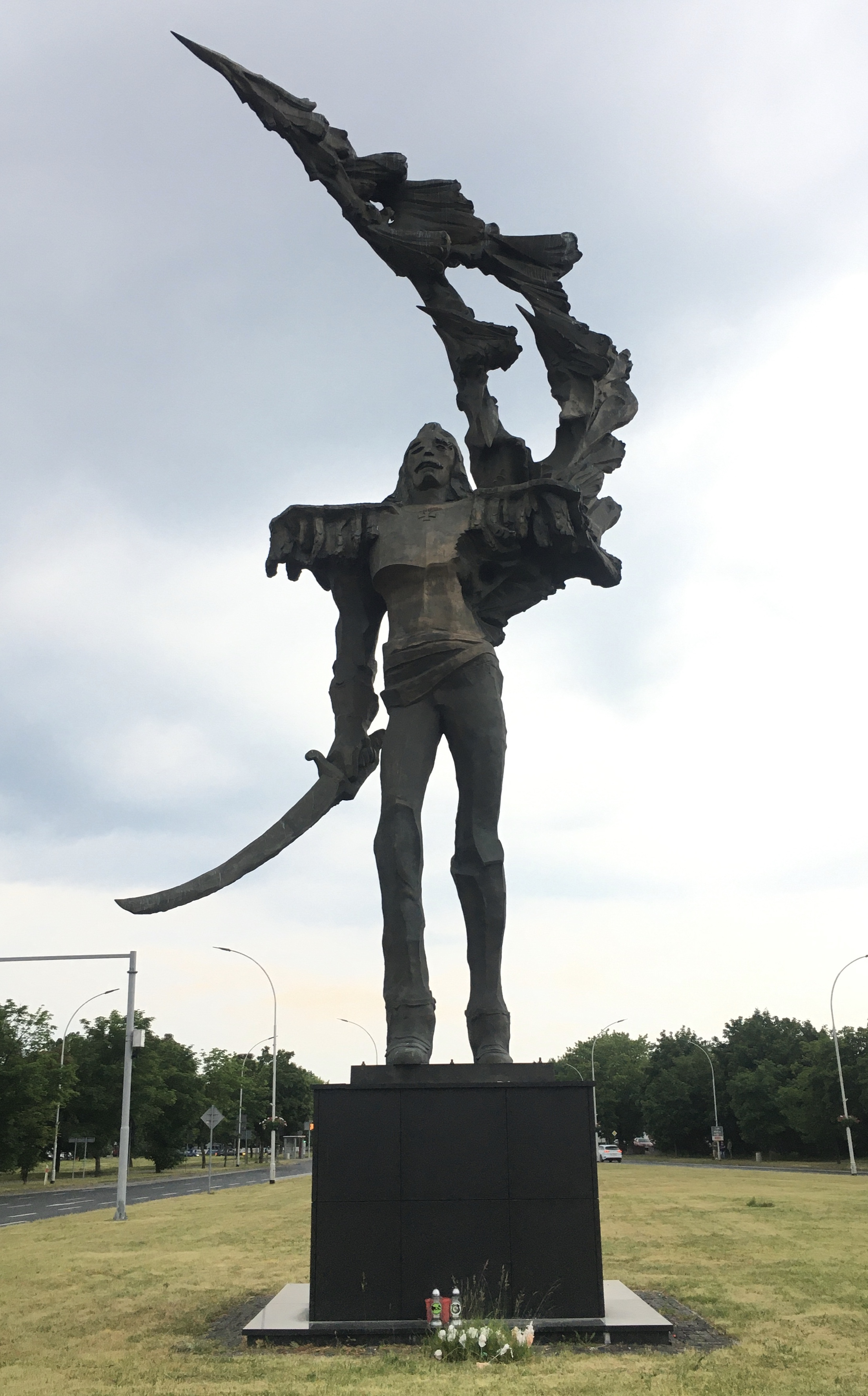
The Patriot Monument

The Patriot Monument is a sculpture by Andrzej Pityński located in the center of Stalowa Wola, symbolizing Polish patriotism. The monument is located at the intersection of John Paul II Avenue and National Education Commission Street. The "Patriot" was completed in 2010 and officially unveiled on 11 September 2011.

== Description of the sculpture ==
Patriot is a 12-meter-tall sculpture made of bronze. The monument, weighing over 5 tons, stands on a two-meter reinforced concrete pedestal covered with granite slabs.

The monument symbolizes the Polish patriot. A long-haired figure in armor holds a saber with the symbolism of the crowned Polish eagle in the right hand. From the left side of the body, near the heart, grows a hussar wing. On the chest, there is the Virtuti Militari Cross – Poland's highest military decoration. Two sword cuts are visible on the face, which symbolically may refer to the cuts on the face of the Black Madonna of Częstochowa. As the sculptor Andrzej Pityński said about his work: "It was created as a symbol of the spirit of the Polish nation, which fought for freedom. It represents a Slav-Sarmatian-hussar".
