= Andrzej Pityński =

Polish sculptor (1947–2020)

- Born: Andrzej Piotr Pityński; 15 March 1947; Ulanów, Poland
- Died: 18 September 2020 (aged 73); Mount Holly, New Jersey, United States
- Known for: Sculpture
- Notable work: Katyn Memorial (Jersey City), The Partisans, Patriot Monument
- Style: Monumental

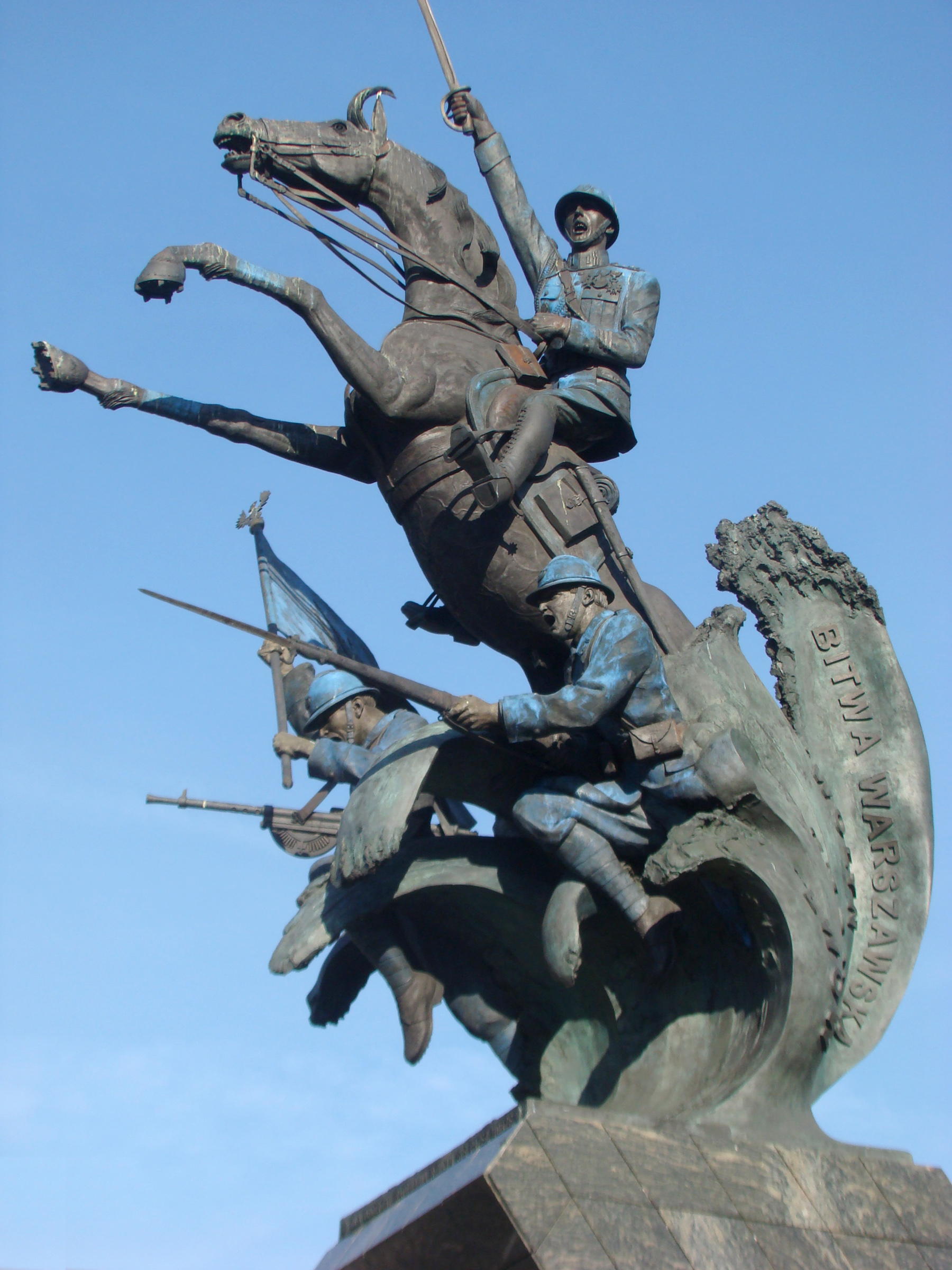
Monument of Polish-American volunteer army 1920 in Warsaw

Andrzej Piotr Pityński (15 March 1947 – 18 September 2020) was a Polish-American monumental sculptor who lived and worked in the United States. A book of his works was published in 2008.

== Work ==
=== The Partisans ===
In January, 2006, his Partisans (1979) was removed from the corner of Beacon and Charles streets on the Boston Common, where it had stood since 1983. Although it was originally destined for Warsaw, the work – which depicts guerrilla Polish freedom fighters in World War II – was not welcomed in communist Poland at that time. On September 6, 2006, the work was moved to the MBTA's Silver-Line World Trade Center Station on the South Boston waterfront. It was permanently relocated to the center median of D Street, at the intersection with Congress Street, on November 17, 2018.

Describing his "Partisans" Pitynski said, that he dedicated this monument to all "Fighters for Freedom in the World", and used Polish Partisans as an example.

=== Patriot Monument ===
Andrzej Pityński created the Patriot Monument in 2010. The bronze sculpture, symbolizing Polish patriotism, stands in the center of Stalowa Wola. Officially unveiled on 11 September 2011.

=== Katyn Memorials ===
Pitynski has worked on a number of works remembering the Katyn massacre including the Katyn Memorial which stands in Exchange Place in Jersey City, New Jersey and the National Katyń Memorial which stands in the Inner Harbor in Baltimore.

=== Volhynian slaughter memorial ===
The memorial to the victims of the Volhynian slaughter, commissioned by the Polish Army Veterans' Association in America, designed by Andrzej Pityński in 2017, has been erected in Domostawa, Poland.

== Andrzej Pitynski on monuments ==
A monument is an expressive symbol. A good one, looked at for even a few minutes will remain in memory for years or even for one's entire lifetime. Monuments are the milestones in a nation's history -- they will not allow other systems and governments to destroy the core values of a national culture.

— Andrzej Pitynski

== Death and funeral ==
Andrzej Pityński died on 18 September 2020 in the United States. On 26 October 2024, he was laid to rest in his hometown of Ulanów, Poland, fulfilling his wish to be buried in his native soil after a four-year wait. The funeral began with a Holy Mass at the Church of St. John the Baptist and St. Barbara in Ulanów. The artist's ashes were then interred at the Holy Trinity Cemetery.

Today, we bid farewell to a great artist and patriot, rightly called an ambassador of our nation's history. He sculpted as he felt—Polish to the core. His works expressed both the glorious and the tragic, embedding themselves permanently in our collective consciousness as symbols of the complex and challenging history of the Republic of Poland.

— Karol Nawrocki, the President of the Institute of National Remembrance, during the funeral ceremony
