= Polish Legion of American Veterans =

U.S. veteran organisation

The Polish Legion of American Veterans, USA (PLAV) is an organization made up of U.S. military veterans. Despite its name, membership in the PLAV is open to all veterans regardless of race, color, religion or national origin. The PLAV motto is "Unity with Heritage."

== Mission ==
The PLAV was founded for the purpose of endorsing ideals of patriotism, allegiance, honor, charity and volunteerism in the service of the United States and its veterans, particularly those that are disabled. It does this through volunteer work, generating awareness, and supporting legislation.

== History ==
The PLAV was a body formed by Polish-American U.S. military veterans after World War I. Its lineage begins with the Alliance of Polish-American Veterans, created in the summer of 1920 after a gathering of veterans from Illinois, Ohio, and Wisconsin in Hawthorne, Illinois. In December 1920, this association held a provisional convention and in September 1921 it held its first regular convention, at which they changed their name to the "Alliance of American Veterans of Polish Extraction." In September 1931 the Alliance of American Veterans of Polish Extraction merged with the Polish Legion of the American Army and a veteran's organization from Michigan to form the PLAV. On February 23, 1984 the PLAV was granted a Federal Charter by President Ronald Reagan. In 1992 they discontinued their requirement that members be of Polish ancestry to join the PLAV.

== Membership eligibility requirements ==
Membership is open to all honorably discharged American veterans and certain Allied veterans as specified in the PLAV national constitution.

== Organizational structure ==
=== Posts ===
The Post is the basic unit of the PLAV and is typically located in an area in the United States that has, or has historically had, a high concentration of Polish-Americans. There are approximately 75 posts in the United States. The Post is used for formal business such as meetings and a coordination point for community service projects. A Post member is distinguished by a navy blue garrison cap with gold piping.

=== Departments ===
The Posts are grouped together into a state level organization known as a Department for the purposes of coordination and administration. There are currently 12 Departments: Connecticut, the District of Columbia, Florida, Illinois, Maryland, Massachusetts, Michigan, New Jersey, New York, Ohio, Pennsylvania, and Wisconsin. The State of Nevada has a representative, but is not a department. A Department Officer is distinguished by a white garrison cap with gold piping.

=== National Department ===
The National Department consists of the National Commander, and national leadership positions of Vice Commander, Treasurer, Judge Advocate, Adjutant, Veterans Affairs Voluntary Service Director, Legislative Director, Quartermaster, and National News Editor/Public Relations Officer. A National Department Officer is distinguished by a red garrison cap with gold piping.

== See also ==
- Polish Army Veterans' Association in America
- Polish Combatants' Association
- List of veterans organizations
