= Cross of Polish Soldiers from America =

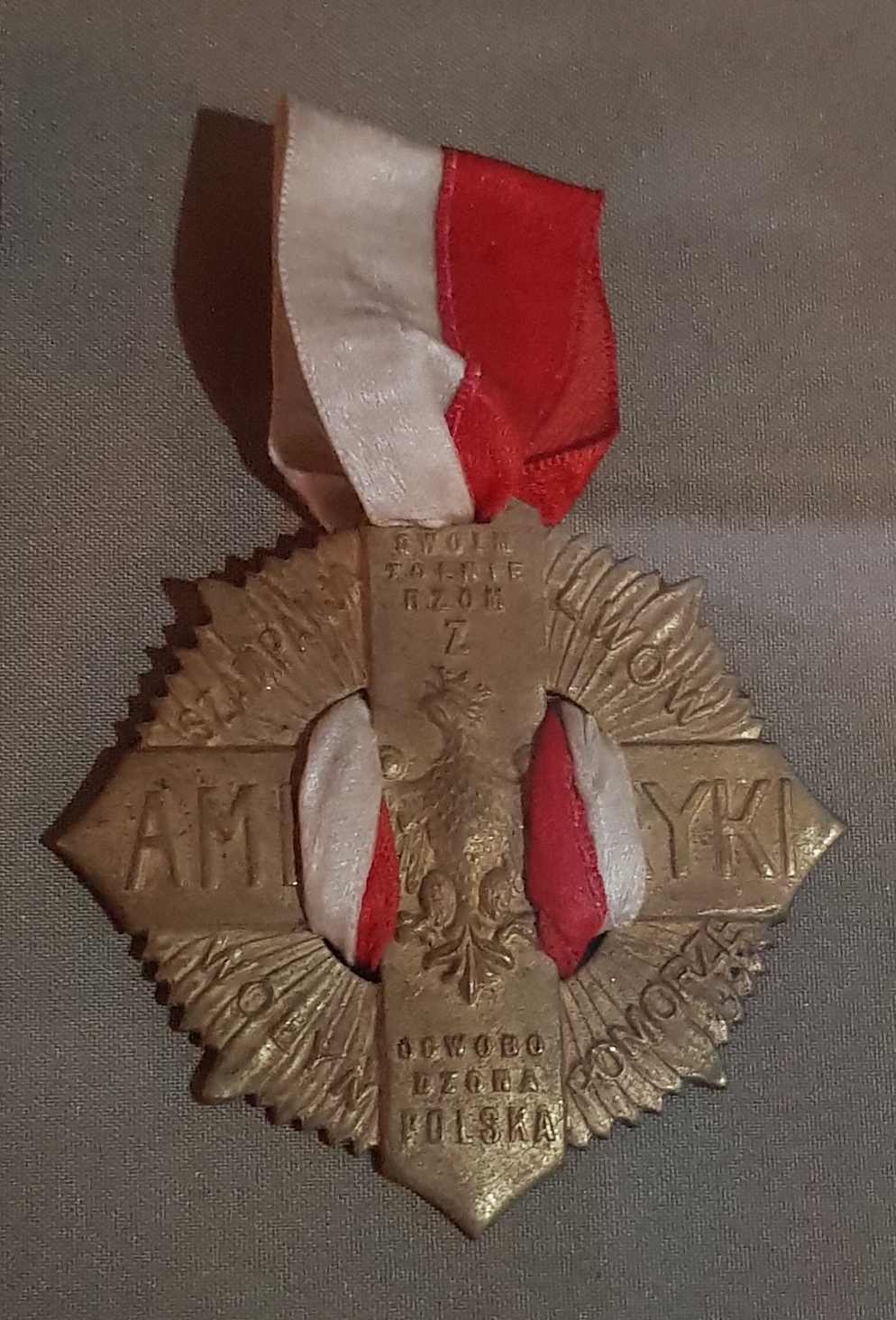
- The Cross of Polish Soldiers from America, in the version issued from 1920 to 1930.
- Established: 1920
- Country: Second Polish Republic
- Motto: Swoim żołnierzom z Ameryki – oswobodzona Polska (To its soldiers from America, the liberated Poland)
- Awarded for: Military efforts in the creation of Poland and the ensuring of its independence from 1918 to 1920
- Status: discontinued in 1927

Statistics
- Total inductees: around 25 000

Precedence
- Next (higher): Cross on Silesian Ribbon of Valor and Merit
- Next (lower): Lifesaving Medal
- The ribbon bar of the Order

The Cross of Polish Soldiers from America (Note: Polish: Krzyż Żołnierzy Polskich z Ameryki) was a military order awarded by the Second Polish Republic, to the volunteers from the United States, and Canada, that served in the Blue Army and the Polish Armed Forces, during the World War I, the Polish–Soviet War, and other conflicts, to commemorate their efforts in the creation of Poland and the ensuring of its independence from 1918 to 1920. It was established in 1920 by Józef Piłsudski, the Chief of State of Poland, and was issued until 1927.

== History ==
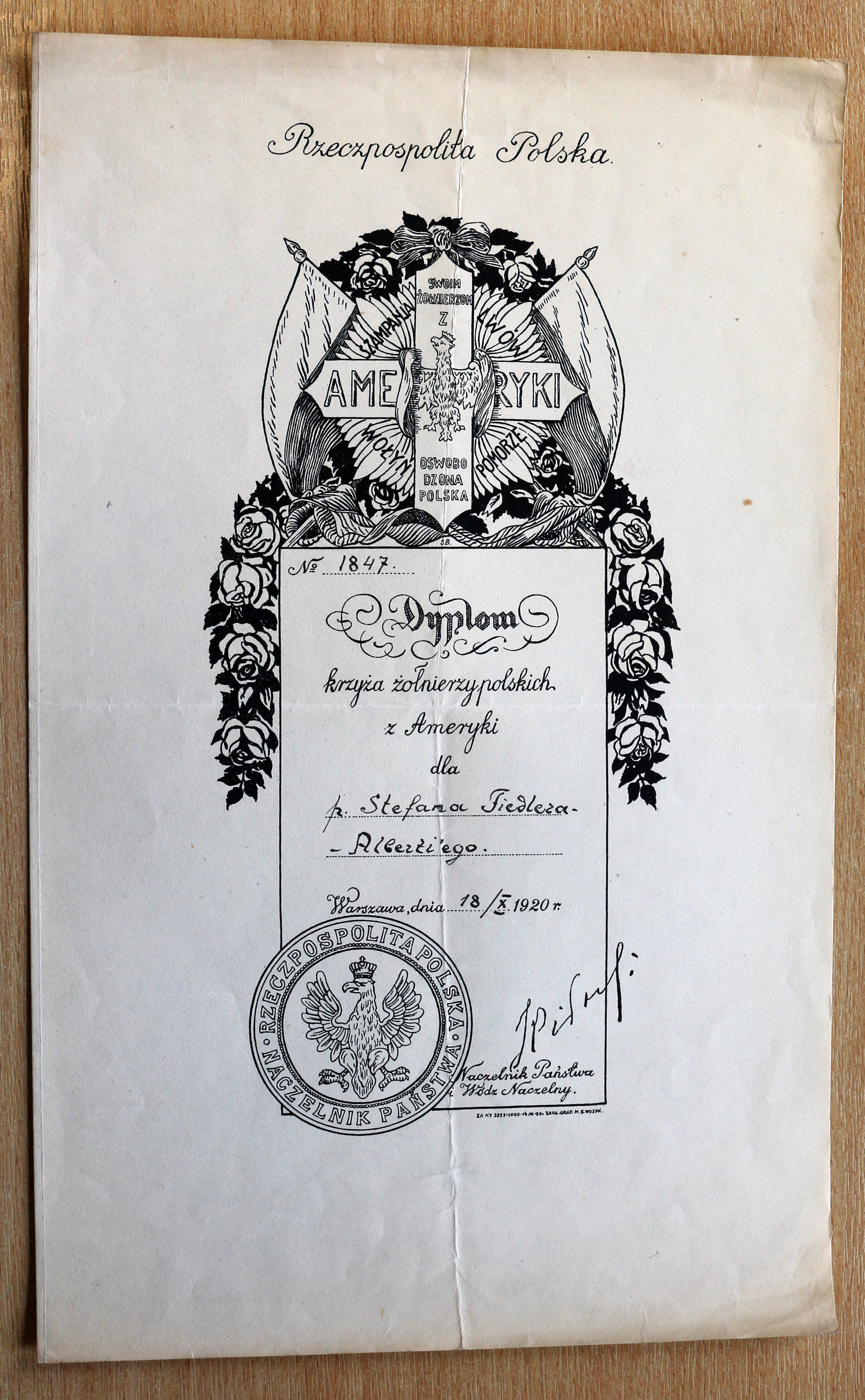
The diploma awarded together with the order in 1920.

The order was established in 1920 by Józef Piłsudski, the Chief of State of Poland. It was awarded to the volunteers from the United States, and Canada, that served in the Blue Army and the Polish Armed Forces, during the World War I, the Polish–Soviet War, and other conflicts, to commemorate their efforts in the creation of Poland and the ensuring of its independence from 1918 to 1920. The order was awarded until 1927. In total, around 25 000 people were awarded the order. In 1930, the smaller version of the cross had been issued.

Currently, the image of the order is used by various veteran organizations of Polish Americans, such as the Polish Army Veterans' Association in America.

== Description ==
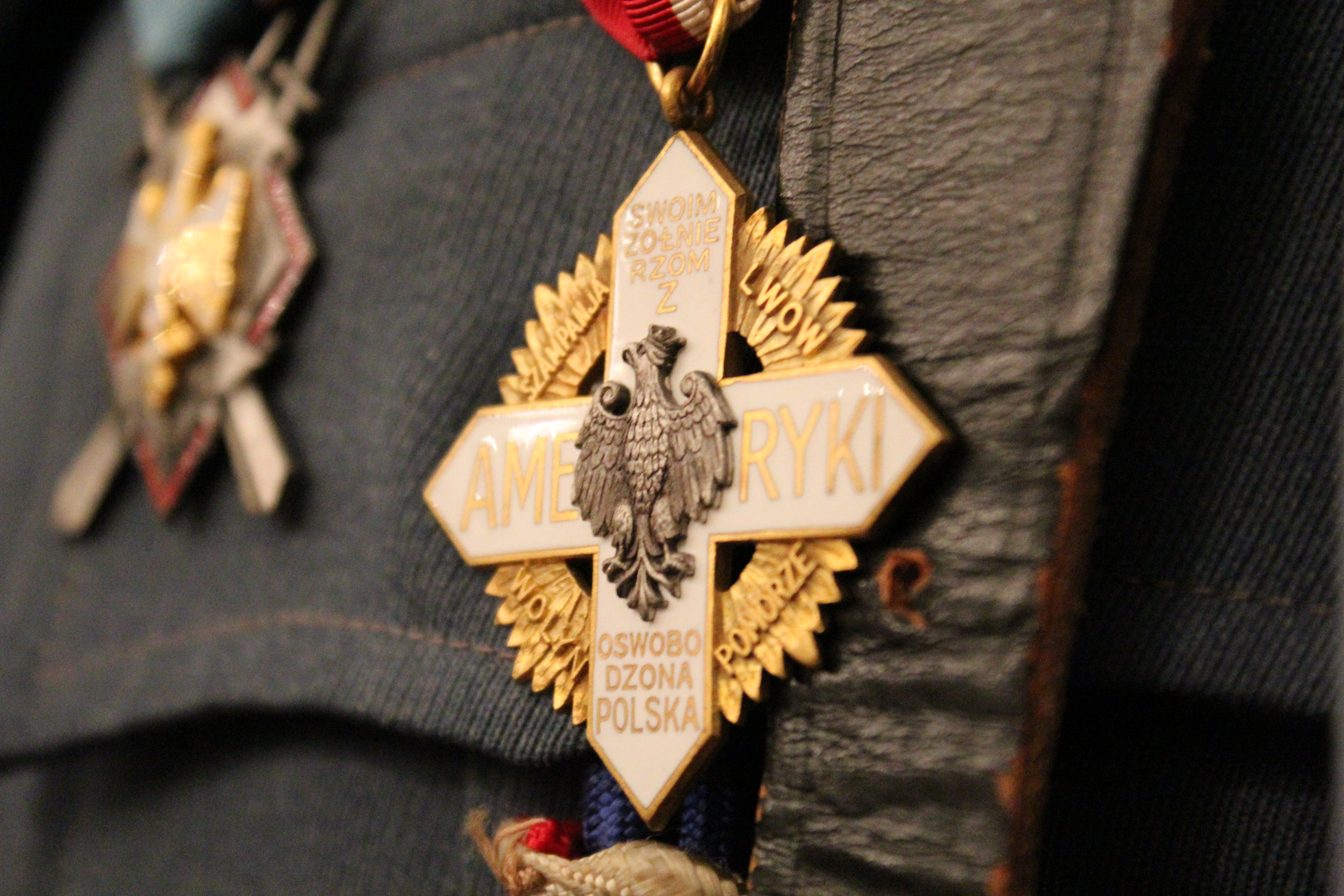
The version of the Cross of Polish Soldiers from America issued since 1930.

The order is made from bronze. It consists of the Arrow Cross with the dimensions of 55 x 55 mm, placed on the ring stylized to look like rays of the sun. In the centre of the cross was placed an eagle with raised wings, and with a crown on its head, which referred to the coat of arms of Poland. To the right and left to the eagle, next to its wings, were holes through which, was put a white and red ribbon, which referred to the flag of Poland. On the top of the cross is placed a text of capital letters, that read "SWOIM ŻOŁNIERZOM Z", while on the bottom, "OSWOBODZONA POLSKA". On the right arm of the cross was "AME", and on the left, "RYKI". When read from top to bottom, and from left to right, the text reads "Swoim żołnierzom z Ameryki – oswobodzona Polska", which in translation from Polish, means "To its soldiers from America, the liberated Poland". On the ring behind the cross, between each arms is written, clockwise, "SZAMPANIA", "LWÓW", "WOŁYŃ", and "POMORZE", which translates to "Champagne", "Lviv", "Volhynia", and "Pomerania", the regions where soldiers awarded with that order fought. The reverse of the order was blank.

The 1930, was introduced a version of the order with smaller cross that had dimensions of 55 x 55 mm, that was covered in the white vitreous enamel.

The order was worn after the Cross on Silesian Ribbon of Valor and Merit, and before the Lifesaving Medal.
