= Katyń Memorial (Jersey City) =

Memorial to Poles massacred by Soviets

- Katyń Memorial in Jersey City
- Artist: Andrzej Pitynski
- Year: 1991
- Medium: Bronze sculpture
- Subject: Katyn massacre
- Dimensions: 10 m (34 ft)
- Location: Jersey City, New Jersey; 40°42′58″N 74°01′59″W

The Katyń Memorial is a bronze statue created by Polish-American sculptor Andrzej Pitynski in dedication to the victims of Stalin's March 5, 1940 Katyn massacre in which thousands of Polish Army officers and intellectual leaders who had been interned at Kozielsk or imprisoned at Ostashkov and Starobielsk had been killed by the occupying Soviet People's Commissariat for Internal Affairs, or NKVD. The memorial stands at Exchange Place in Jersey City, New Jersey, United States, near the mouth of the Hudson River. Unveiled in June 1991, the statue depicts a bound and gagged Polish soldier with a bayoneted rifle impaled through his back. The statue stands 34-foot-tall (10-meter) and is atop a granite base containing Katyn soil. Its base also depicts a Polish woman carrying her starving child in memorial to the Polish citizens deported to Siberia that began shortly before the massacre.

== Plaque commemorating victims of September 11 attacks ==
After the September 11 attacks a plaque was unveiled on the front side of the pediment, saying:

NEVER FORGET! PRAY FOR ALL THE INNOCENT VICTIMS AND HEROES WHO DIED IN THE TERRORIST ATTACK ON AMERICA SEPTEMBER 11, 2001

The unveiling ceremony took place on September 12, 2004.

== Relocation controversy ==
In April 2018, it was announced that there were plans to remove the memorial as Exchange Place was to be made into a park. Mike DeMarco, chair of the Exchange Place Special Improvement District, was quoted by The Jersey Journal as being in favor of the removal calling the statue "politically incorrect" and stating "I don't think the statue's appropriate for a major metropolitan area ... [The monument is] a little gruesome ... I can't imagine how many mothers go by and have to explain it to their children." In a tactical move in November the mayor withdrew his support of the plan.

In early May 2018, Holocaust survivor Edward Mosberg co-signed a letter asking Jersey City Mayor Steven Fulop not to remove the Katyń Memorial from Exchange Place in the city, writing: "The memory of the Katyn massacre is an important part of the memory and memories of the Holocaust and we encourage you to reconsider your decision to remove this monument."

Following opposition by Polish-Americans and Polish officials, this plan was rescinded and it has been agreed that the monument will be relocated 200 feet away but will remain on the waterfront in a location that is both dignified and practical. Andrzej Duda, the President of Poland, visited the monument and had a brief exchange with Jersey City Mayor Steven Fulop about the relocation of the monument on May 16, 2018.

The proposed site is a matter of controversy. The inability of the city council to resolve the matter would likely have led to a citywide referendum.

On December 20, 2018, the nine-member Jersey City Council voted unanimously to adopt an ordinance that the monument remain where it stands in Exchange Place “in perpetuity”.

== Polish president's visit ==
In May 2018, Polish President Andrzej Duda visited the Jersey City Katyn Memorial, amidst the debate over the monument staying in Exchange Place or moving to the end of York Street. Duda's visit lasted only a few minutes, in which he placed a wreath on the monument, but did not speak to the press. The Polish President had previously visited the monument in 2016 during a visit to the U.S. to meet with the United Nations. In addition, during Duda's visit, two groups of protesters gathered at the site to protest the possible moving of the monument.

Furthermore, this visit by the Polish President came two days after Jersey City Mayor Steven Fulop announced that the monument would be moved to the end of York Street. Fulop told the press prior to the President's visit that he would welcome him and he would give him a gift on behalf of the people of Jersey City. Fulop presented Duda with a wreath that the Polish President laid down at the base of the monument. They spoke briefly. Fulop relayed to the press that President Duda was "very direct" and expressed his preference for the monument remaining in place and Duda asked that the monument be placed in a respected location if it was not possible for it to remain in its original location.

== See also ==
- List of public art in Jersey City, New Jersey
- Jersey City 9/11 Memorial
