= National Katyń Memorial =

Polish war memorial in Baltimore

Coordinates: 39°16′59.44″N 76°36′6″W

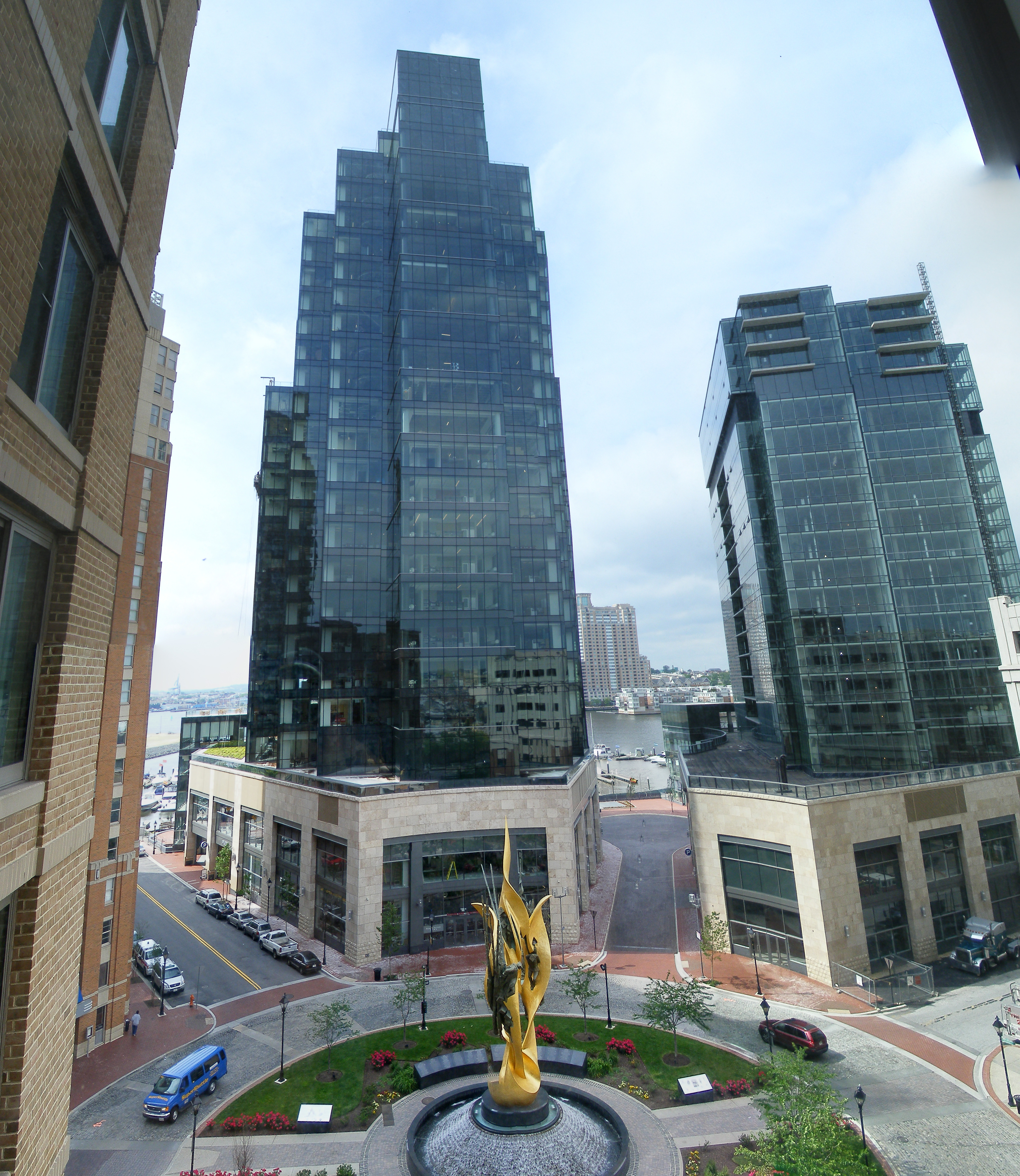
- Interactive map of National Katyń Memorial
- Location: Aliceanna Street; Baltimore, Maryland
- Material: Bronze, granite
- Height: 56 feet (17 m)
- Completion date: 2000
- Dedicated to: Victims of the Katyn massacre

The National Katyń Memorial is a monument in Baltimore, Maryland, which memorializes the victims of the 1940 Katyn massacre of Polish nationals carried out by Soviet forces. Baltimore's Polish-American community was instrumental in having the monument built. The monument was unveiled in 2000 and is the tallest statue in Baltimore. The statue itself is 44 feet (13.4 m) high, the whole monument, with base, is 56 feet (17 m).

The statue by sculptor Andrzej Pitynski was delivered from Poland and established in the Inner Harbor East at Aliceanna and President streets.
