= Polish Army Veterans' Association in America =

Polish-American veteran association

Polish Army Veterans' Association in America (Stowarzyszenie Weteranów Armii Polskiej w Ameryce, SWAP)
- Established: May 1921
- Address: 119 East 15th Street; New York, NY 10003
- Location: New York City, United States of America

The Polish Army Veterans' Association in America (Stowarzyszenie Weteranów Armii Polskiej w Ameryce, SWAP), founded in May 1921 is a Polish-American association for veterans of the Blue Army during World War I.

== History ==
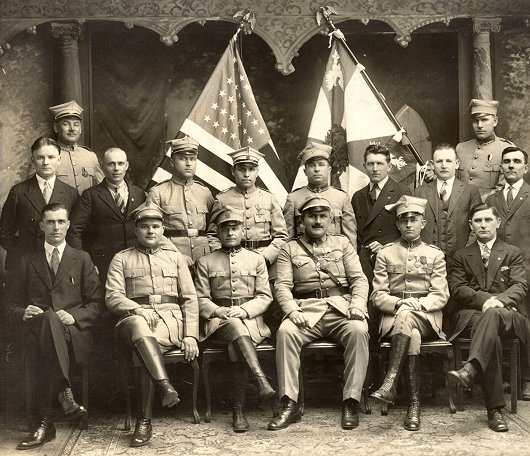
SWAP Branch #57 in Elizabeth, New Jersey in 1928.

During World War I the Polonia in the United States and Canada provided more than 28,000 volunteers to the Polish Army in France. About 14,500 returned after the War to America. In May 1921, at a convention in Cleveland the veterans founded the SWAP. Its first president was Teofil Starzyński, an outstanding activist with the Polish Falcons.

== See also ==
- Polish Combatants' Association
- Polish Legion of American Veterans
