= Kazimierz Bocheński =

Polish swimmer

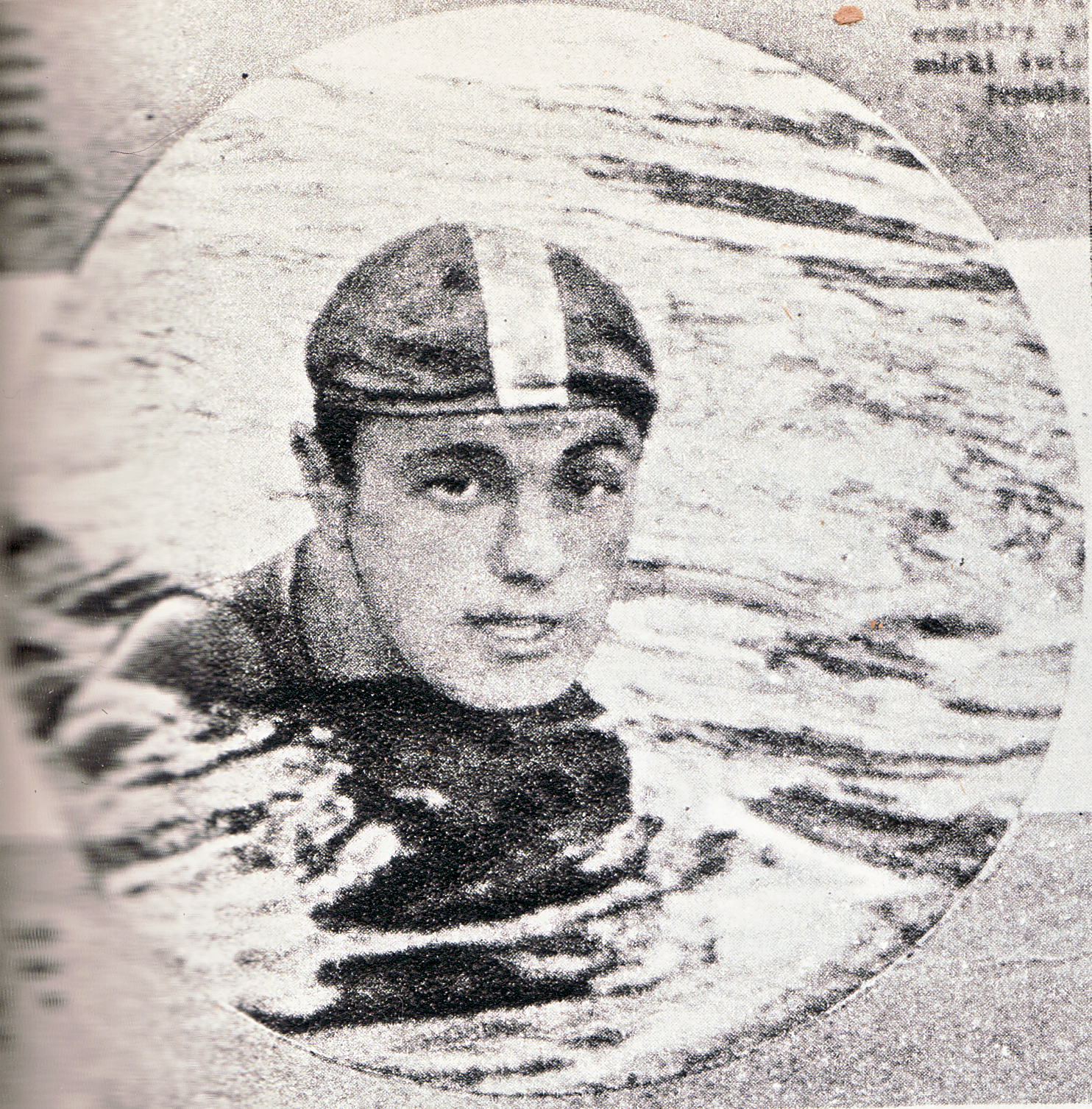

Personal information
- Born: 12 May 1910 Glinianka, Poland
- Died: May 1940 Kharkiv, Ukrainian SSR, Soviet Union

Sport
- Sport: Swimming

Roman Kazimierz Wiesław Bocheński (12 May 1910 – May 1940) was a Polish freestyle swimmer. He competed in the men's 4 × 200 metre freestyle relay at the 1936 Summer Olympics. He was murdered in a prisoner of war camp in World War II.
