= Gmina Ulanów =

Gmina Ulanów Ulanów Commune
- Gmina
- Coat of arms
- Interactive map of Gmina Ulanów
- Coordinates (Ulanów): 50°30′N 22°16′E
- Country: Poland
- Voivodeship: Subcarpathian
- County: Nisko
- Seat: Ulanów

Area
  - Total: 119.56 km^{2} (46.16 sq mi)

Population (2013)
  - Total: 8,591
  - Density: 71.86/km^{2} (186.1/sq mi)
  - Urban: 1,472
  - Rural: 7,119
- Website: http://www.ulanow.iap.pl

Gmina Ulanów is an urban-rural gmina (administrative district) in Nisko County, Subcarpathian Voivodeship, in south-eastern Poland. Its seat is the town of Ulanów, which lies approximately 11 kilometres (7 mi) east of Nisko and 55 km (34 mi) north of the regional capital Rzeszów.

The gmina covers an area of 119.56 square kilometres (46.2 sq mi), and as of 2006 its total population is 8,612 (out of which the population of Ulanów amounts to 1,494, and the population of the rural part of the gmina is 7,118).

== Villages ==
Apart from the town of Ulanów, Gmina Ulanów contains the villages and settlements of Bieliniec, Bieliny, Borki, Bukowina, Dąbrowica, Dąbrówka, Dyjaki, Glinianka, Huta Deręgowska, Koszary, Kurzyna Mała, Kurzyna Średnia, Kurzyna Wielka, Podbuk, Podosiczyna, Ryczki, Wólka Bielińska and Wólka Tanewska.

== Neighbouring gminas ==
Gmina Ulanów is bordered by the gminas of Harasiuki, Jarocin, Krzeszów, Nisko, Pysznica and Rudnik nad Sanem.
