= Kurzyna Wielka =

- Village
- Location within Poland
- Coordinates: 50°29′53″N 22°23′20″E
- Country: Poland
- Voivodeship: Subcarpathian
- County: Nisko
- Gmina: Ulanów

Kurzyna Wielka [kuˈʐɨna ˈvʲɛlka] is a village in the administrative district of Gmina Ulanów, within Nisko County, Subcarpathian Voivodeship, in south-eastern Poland. The village is located in the historical region Galicia.
