= Kurzyna Mała =

- Village
- Location within Poland
- Coordinates: 50°30′55″N 22°21′11″E
- Country: Poland
- Voivodeship: Subcarpathian
- County: Nisko
- Gmina: Ulanów

Kurzyna Mała [kuˈʐɨna ˈmawa] is a village in the administrative district of Gmina Ulanów, within Nisko County, Subcarpathian Voivodeship, in south-eastern Poland.
