= Wólka Bielińska =

- Village
- Location within Poland
- Coordinates: 50°28′N 22°17′E
- Country: Poland
- Voivodeship: Subcarpathian
- County: Nisko
- Gmina: Ulanów
- Time zone: UTC+1 (CET)
  - Summer (DST): UTC+2 (CEST)
- Vehicle registration: RNI

Wólka Bielińska [ˈvulka bʲɛˈlʲiɲska] is a village in the administrative district of Gmina Ulanów, within Nisko County, Subcarpathian Voivodeship, in south-eastern Poland.
