= Huta Deręgowska =

- Village
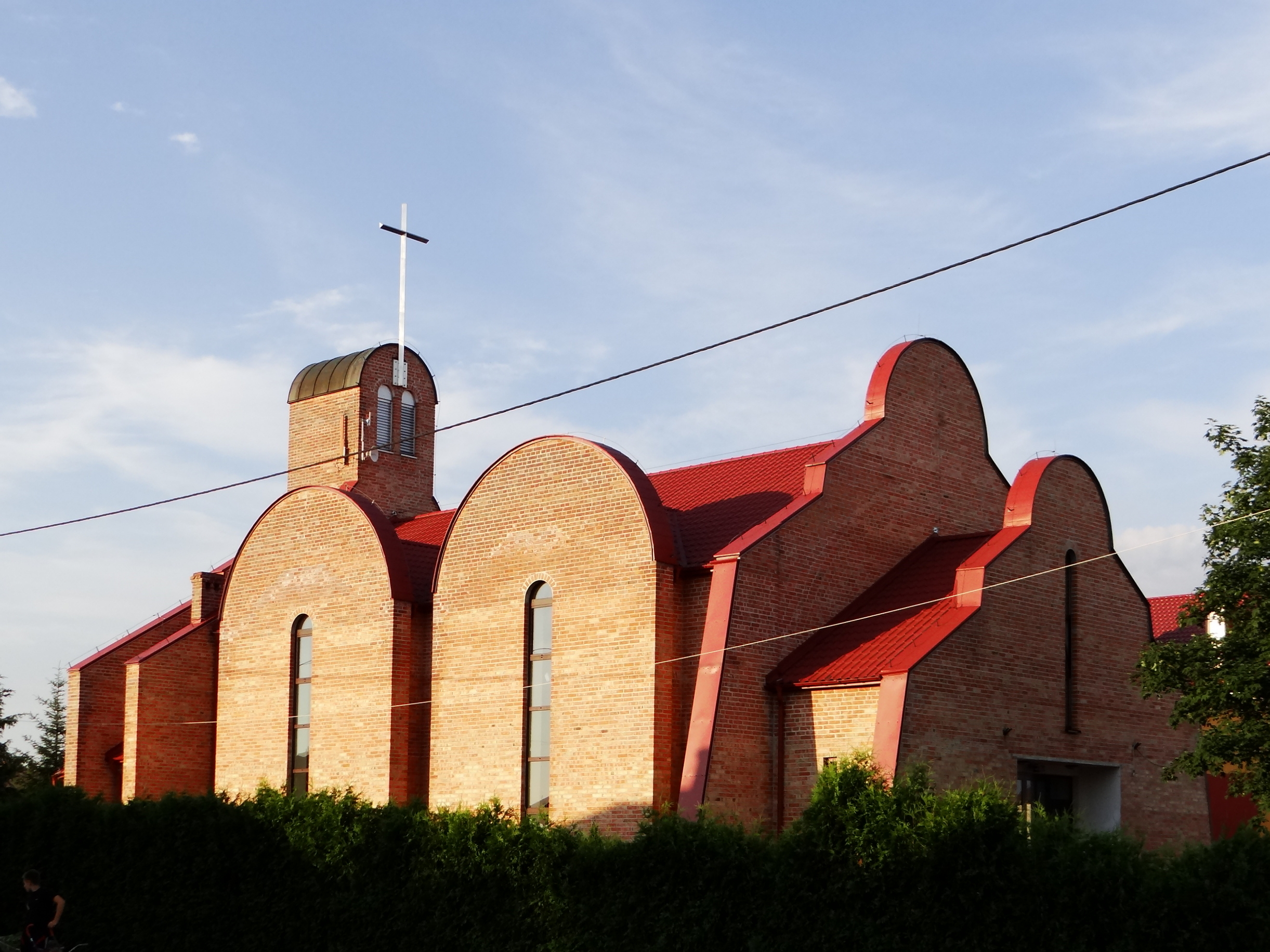
- Our Lady of Consolation church in Huta Deręgowska

- Location within Poland
- Coordinates: 50°33′N 22°15′E
- Country: Poland
- Voivodeship: Subcarpathian
- County: Nisko
- Gmina: Ulanów
- Time zone: UTC+1 (CET)
  - Summer (DST): UTC+2 (CEST)
- Vehicle registration: RNI

Huta Deręgowska [ˈxuta dɛrɛŋˈɡɔfska] is a village in the administrative district of Gmina Ulanów, within Nisko County, Subcarpathian Voivodeship, in south-eastern Poland.

Five Polish citizens were murdered by Nazi Germany in the village during World War II.
