= Ulanów =

Town in Podkarpackie Voivodeship, Poland

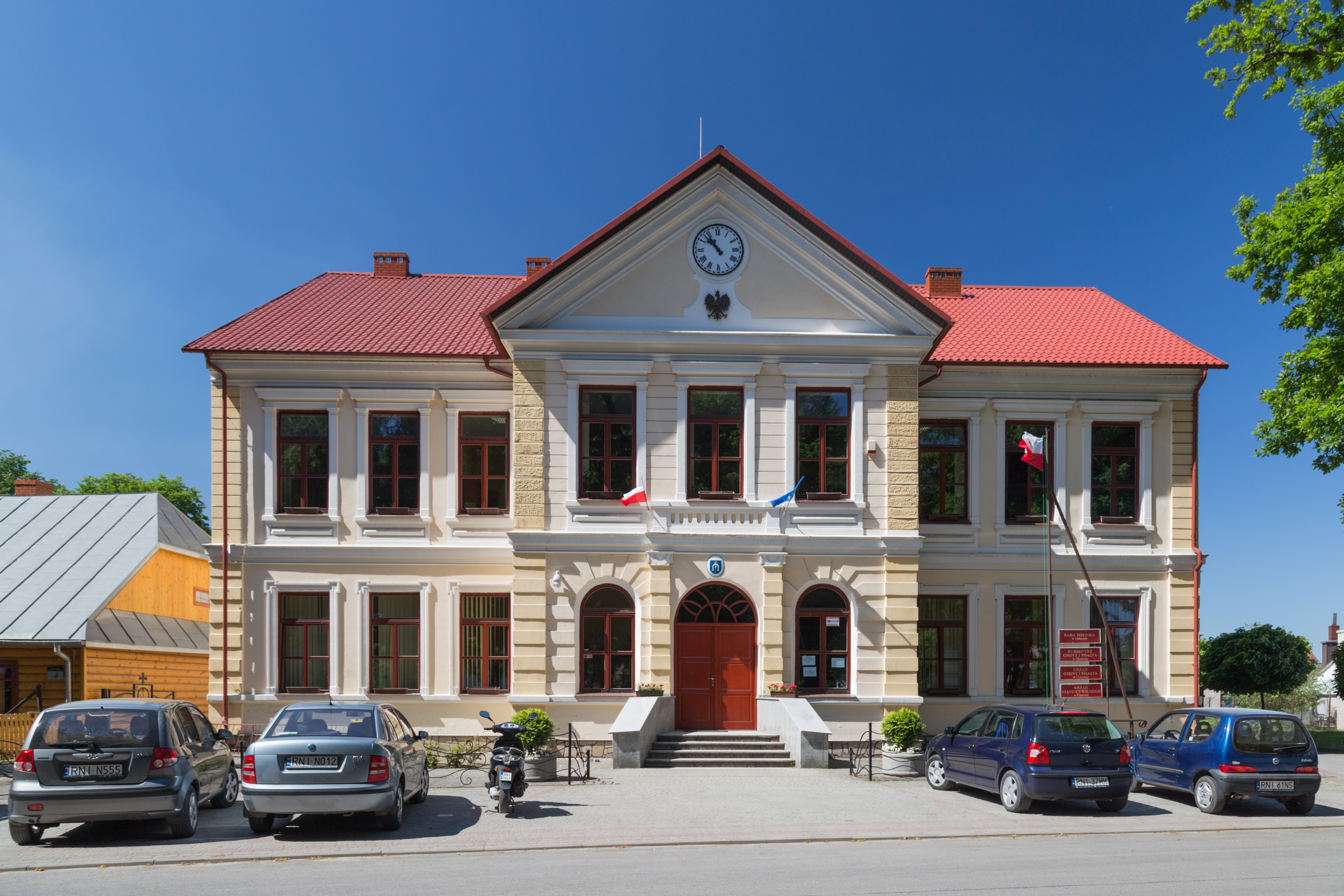
- Town hall

- Coat of arms

- Location within Poland
- Coordinates: 50°30′N 22°16′E
- Country: Poland
- Voivodeship: Subcarpathian
- County: Nisko
- Gmina: Ulanów
- Founded: 1616

Government
  - Mayor: Stanisław Garbacz

Area
  - Total: 8.08 km^{2} (3.12 sq mi)

Population (2006)
  - Total: 1,494
  - Density: 185/km^{2} (479/sq mi)
- Time zone: UTC+1 (CET)
  - Summer (DST): UTC+2 (CEST)
- Postal code: 37–410
- Vehicle registration: RNI
- Website: http://www.ulanow.iap.pl

Ulanów [uˈlanuf] is a town in Nisko County, Subcarpathian Voivodeship, Poland, with 1,491 inhabitants (02.06.2009).

== History ==
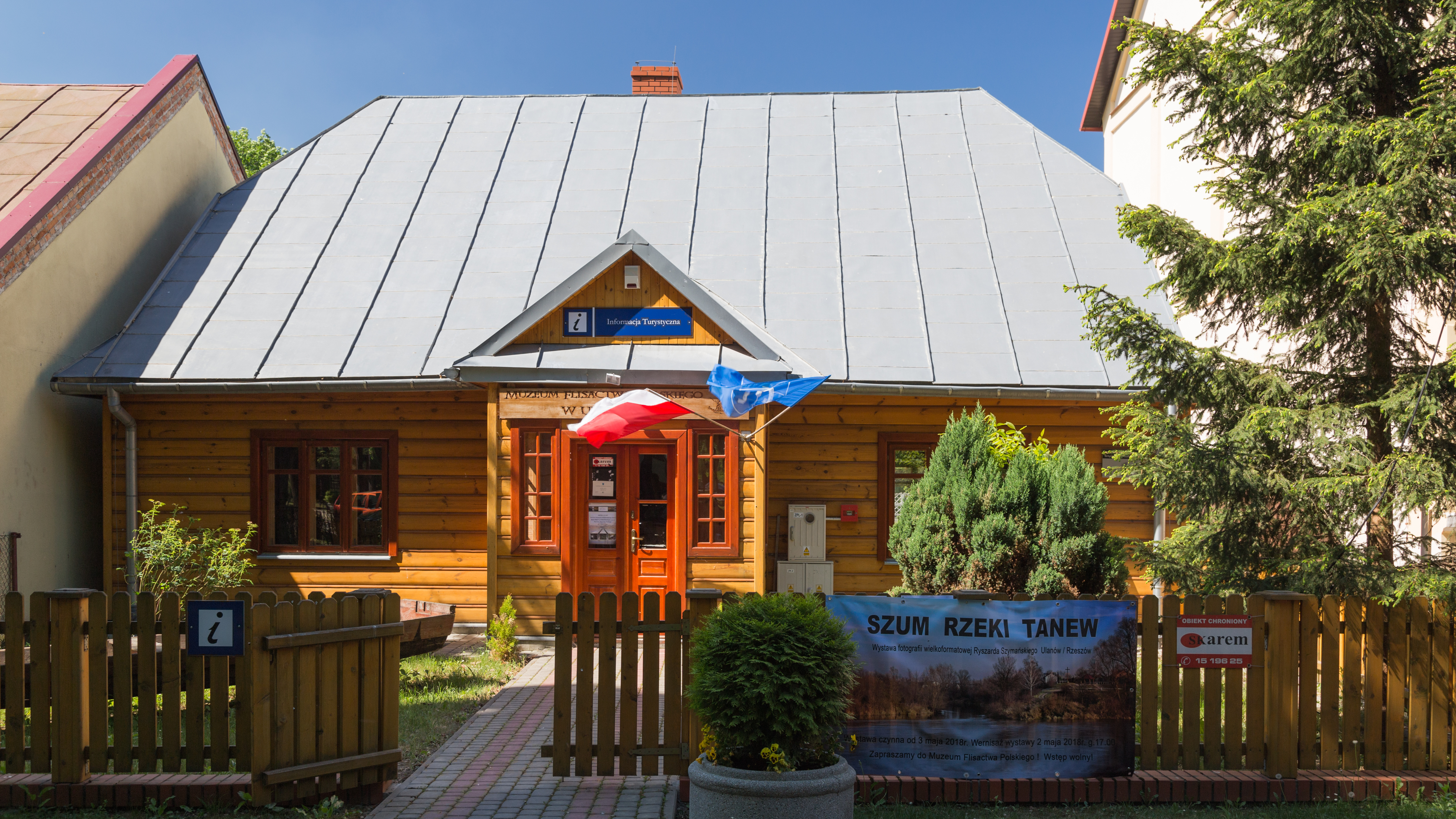
Museum of Rafting in Ulanów

The town of Ulanów was founded in 1616 by nobleman Stanisław Ulina. Due to its location at the confluence of the San River and the Tanew, Ulanów was a river port, with a harbour and boat building shops. The town prospered until the Swedish invasion (Deluge; 1655–1660), when it was ransacked and destroyed.

Following the First Partition of Poland, Ulanów was in 1772 annexed by the Habsburg Empire, and remained within Austrian Galicia until late 1918. In the 19th century, it was a private town, and belonged to several noble families.

World War I brought widespread destruction, followed my mass exodus and reduction of the population of Ulanów. As a result, it lost its town charter in 1934, remaining a village until 1958. During World War II, Ulanów was occupied by Germany.

=== Jews of Ulanów ===
Ulanów was once a multicultural town with Jewish population of about 40%. Around World War I, the Jewish population was halved. Many died during World War I because of hard work and lack of sufficient food. Their homes and businesses were looted during the war. Anti-Semitism was increasing and in 1905 the Jews were falsely charged with denigrating the cross that stood in the road. The Jewish population was decimated in World War II and none remain today.
