= Bieliniec =

- Village
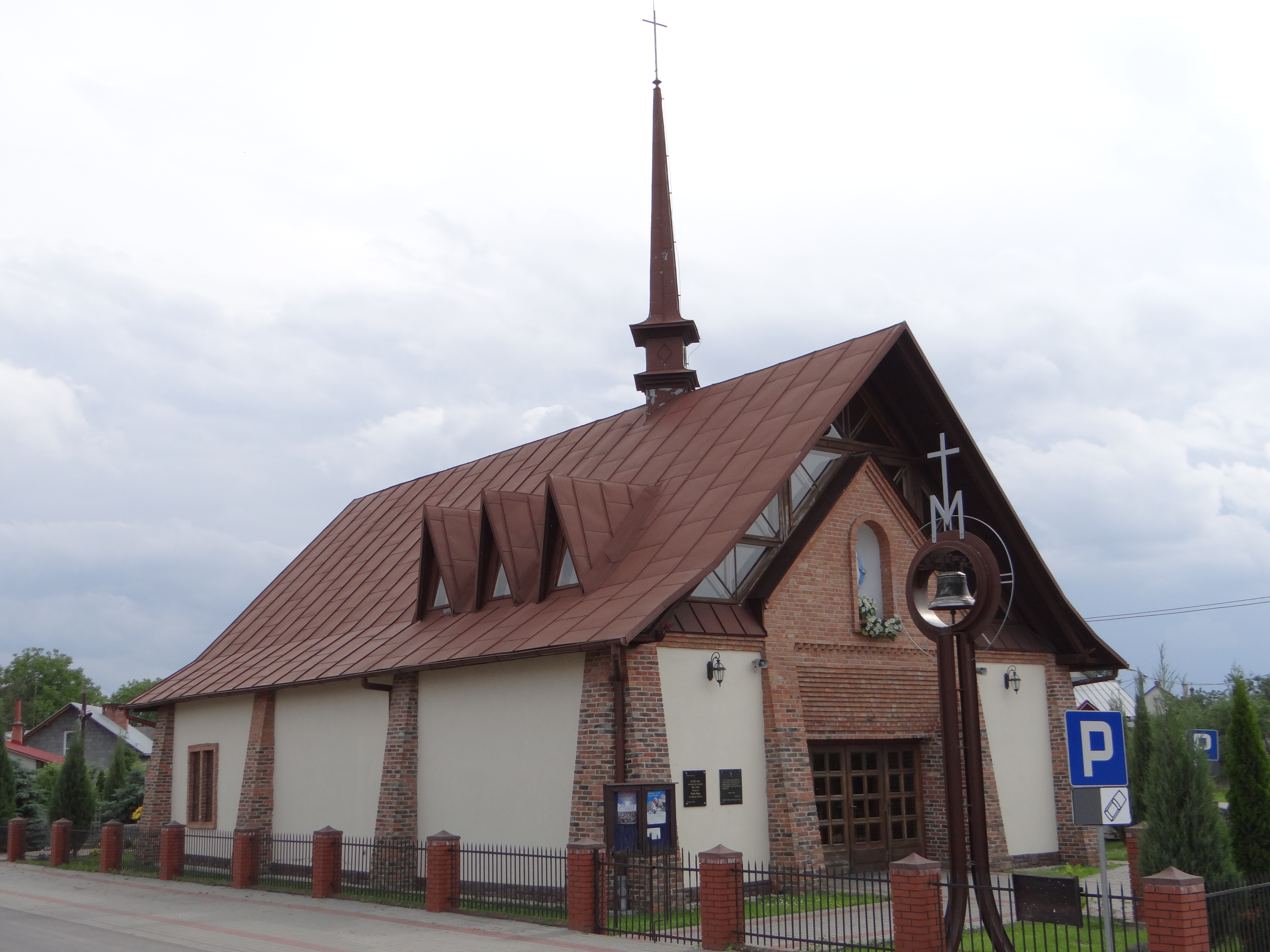
- Chapel of Our Lady of the Church

- Location within Poland
- Coordinates: 50°28′N 22°16′E
- Country: Poland
- Voivodeship: Subcarpathian
- County: Nisko
- Gmina: Ulanów

Bieliniec [bʲɛˈlʲiɲɛt͡s] is a village in the administrative district of Gmina Ulanów, within Nisko County, Subcarpathian Voivodeship, in south-eastern Poland.
