= Borki, Podkarpackie Voivodeship =

Borki
- Village
- Location within Poland
- Coordinates: 50°32′N 22°19′E
- Country: Poland
- Voivodeship: Subcarpathian
- County: Nisko
- Gmina: Ulanów

Borki [ˈbɔrkʲi] is a village in the administrative district of Gmina Ulanów, within Nisko County, Subcarpathian Voivodeship, in south-eastern Poland.
