= Koszary, Nisko County =

Koszary
- Settlement
- Location within Poland
- Coordinates: 50°32′28″N 22°20′22″E
- Country: Poland
- Voivodeship: Subcarpathian
- County: Nisko
- Gmina: Ulanów

Koszary [kɔˈʂarɨ] is a settlement in the administrative district of Gmina Ulanów, within Nisko County, Subcarpathian Voivodeship, in south-eastern Poland.
