= Ryczki, Gmina Ulanów =

Ryczki
- Settlement
- Location within Poland
- Coordinates: 50°32′29″N 22°19′40″E
- Country: Poland
- Voivodeship: Subcarpathian
- County: Nisko
- Gmina: Ulanów

Ryczki [ˈrɨt͡ʂki] is a settlement in the administrative district of Gmina Ulanów, within Nisko County, Subcarpathian Voivodeship, in south-eastern Poland.
