= Kurzyna Średnia =

- Village
- Location within Poland
- Coordinates: 50°30′37″N 22°21′45″E
- Country: Poland
- Voivodeship: Subcarpathian
- County: Nisko
- Gmina: Ulanów

Kurzyna Średnia [kuˈʐɨna ˈɕrɛdɲa] is a village in the administrative district of Gmina Ulanów, within Nisko County, Subcarpathian Voivodeship, in south-eastern Poland.
