= Bukowina, Nisko County =

Bukowina
- Village
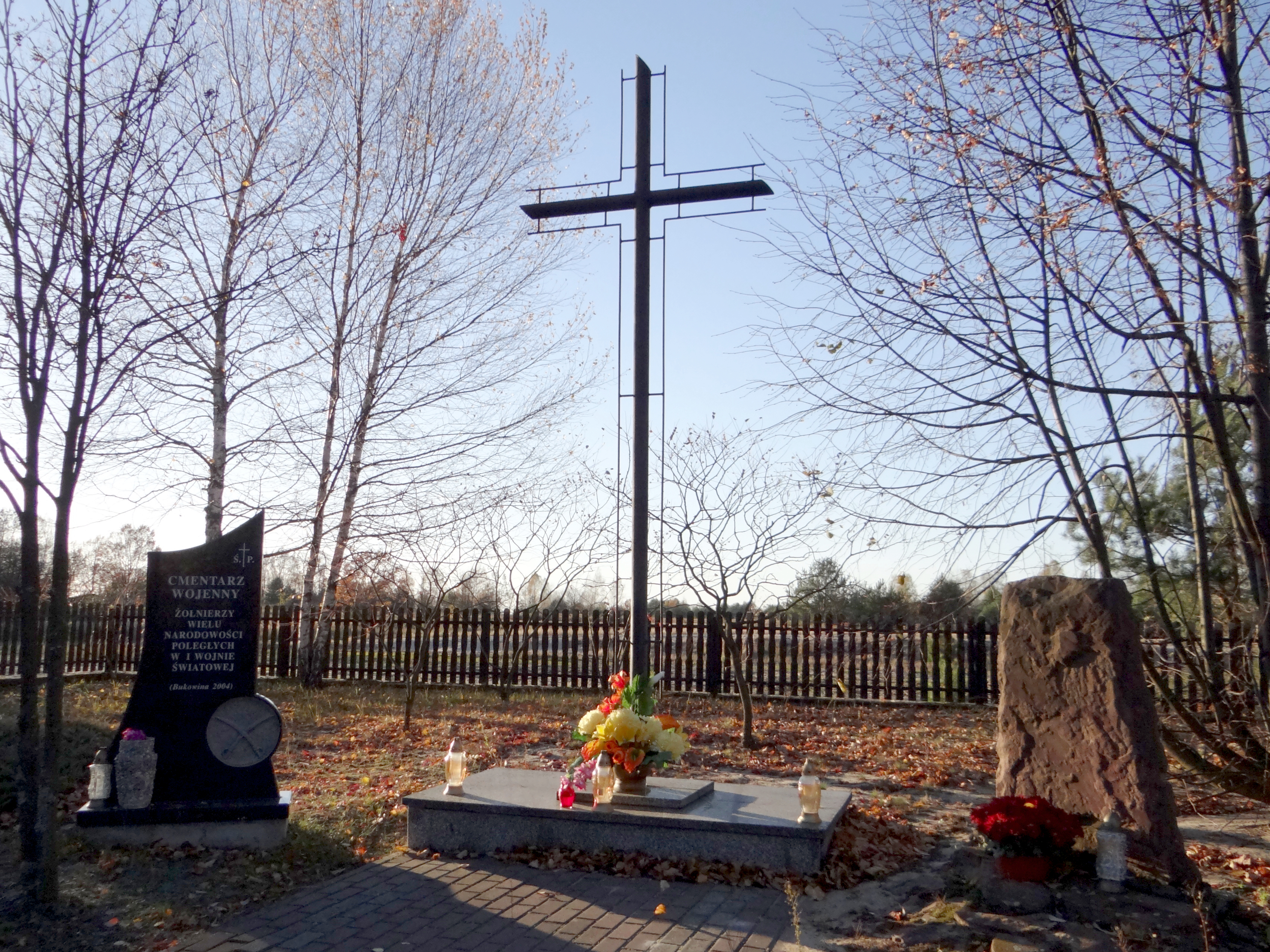
- World War I cemetery

- Location within Poland
- Coordinates: 50°26′N 22°19′E
- Country: Poland
- Voivodeship: Subcarpathian
- County: Nisko
- Gmina: Ulanów

Bukowina [bukɔˈvʲina] is a village in the administrative district of Gmina Ulanów, within Nisko County, Subcarpathian Voivodeship, in south-eastern Poland. The village is located in the historical region Galicia. After partition of Poland the village was under Austrian Habsburg rule. The border checkpoint from tzarist Russia and Austria-Hungary days has been reconstructed in the nearby forest.

World War I historic cemetery is located in Bukowina. 96 soldiers of various nationalities who died in 1914 and 1915 have been buried there.

Bukowina

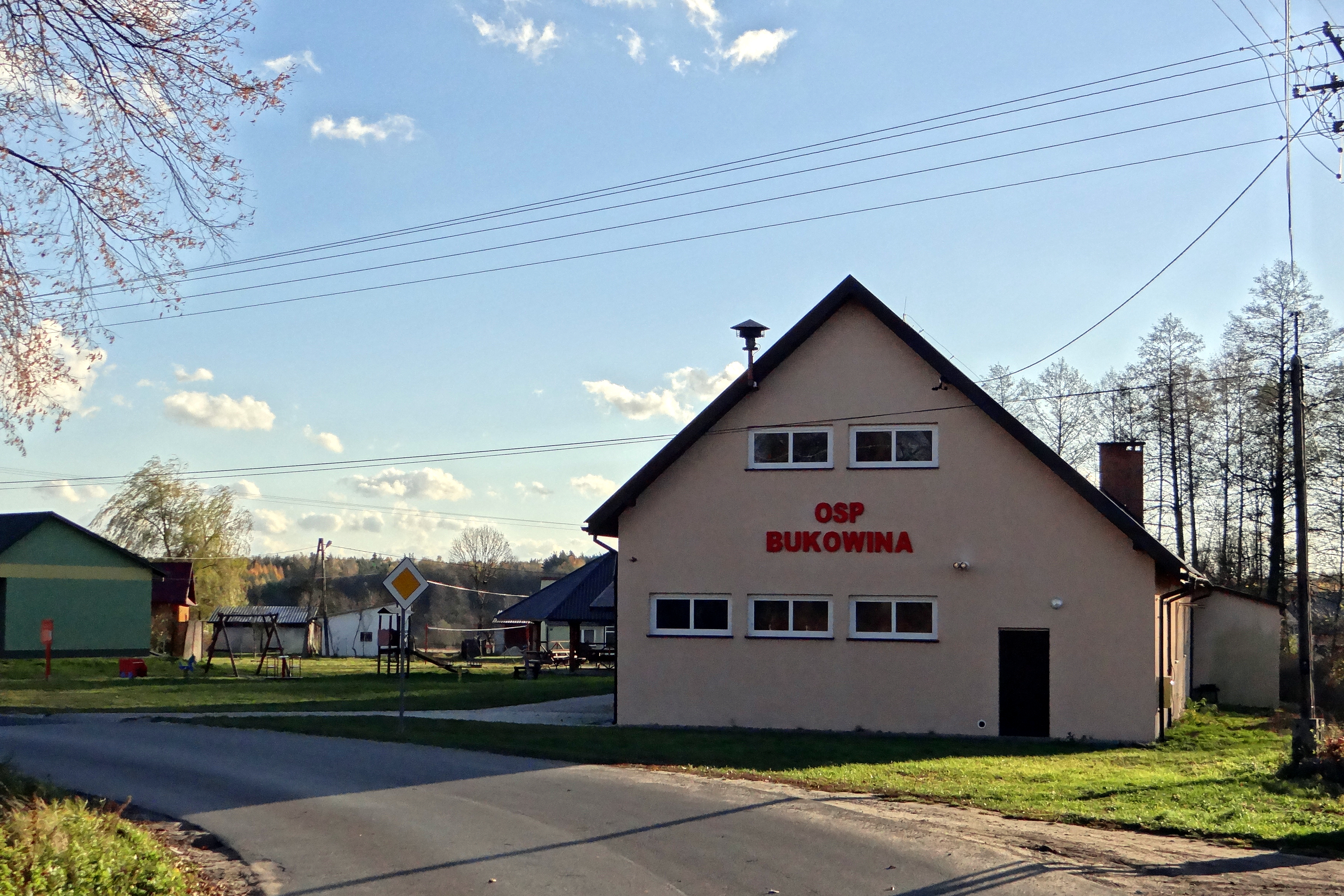
Building of Volunteer Fire Department

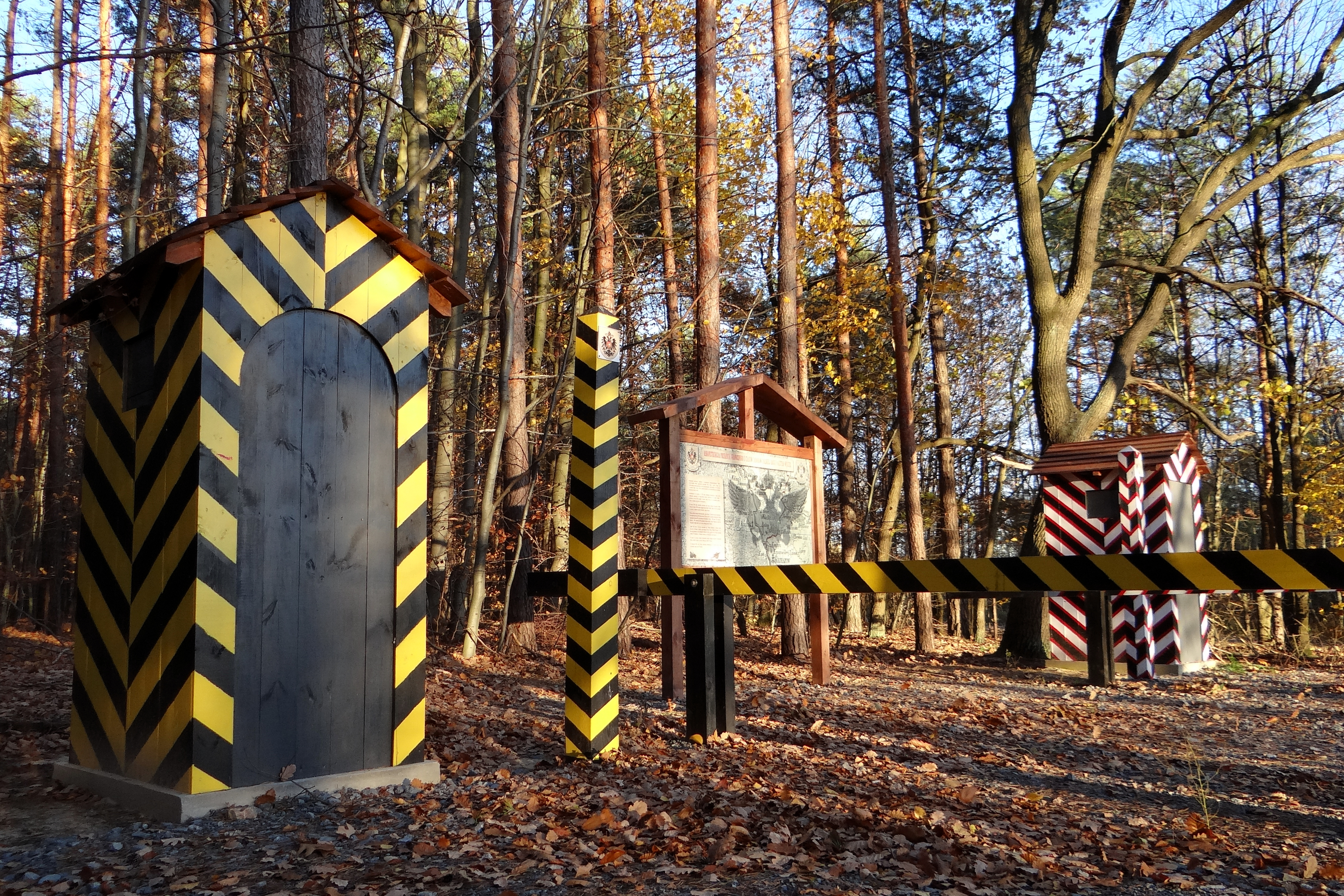
Reconnstrion of border checkpoint from tzarist Russia and Austria-Hungary days

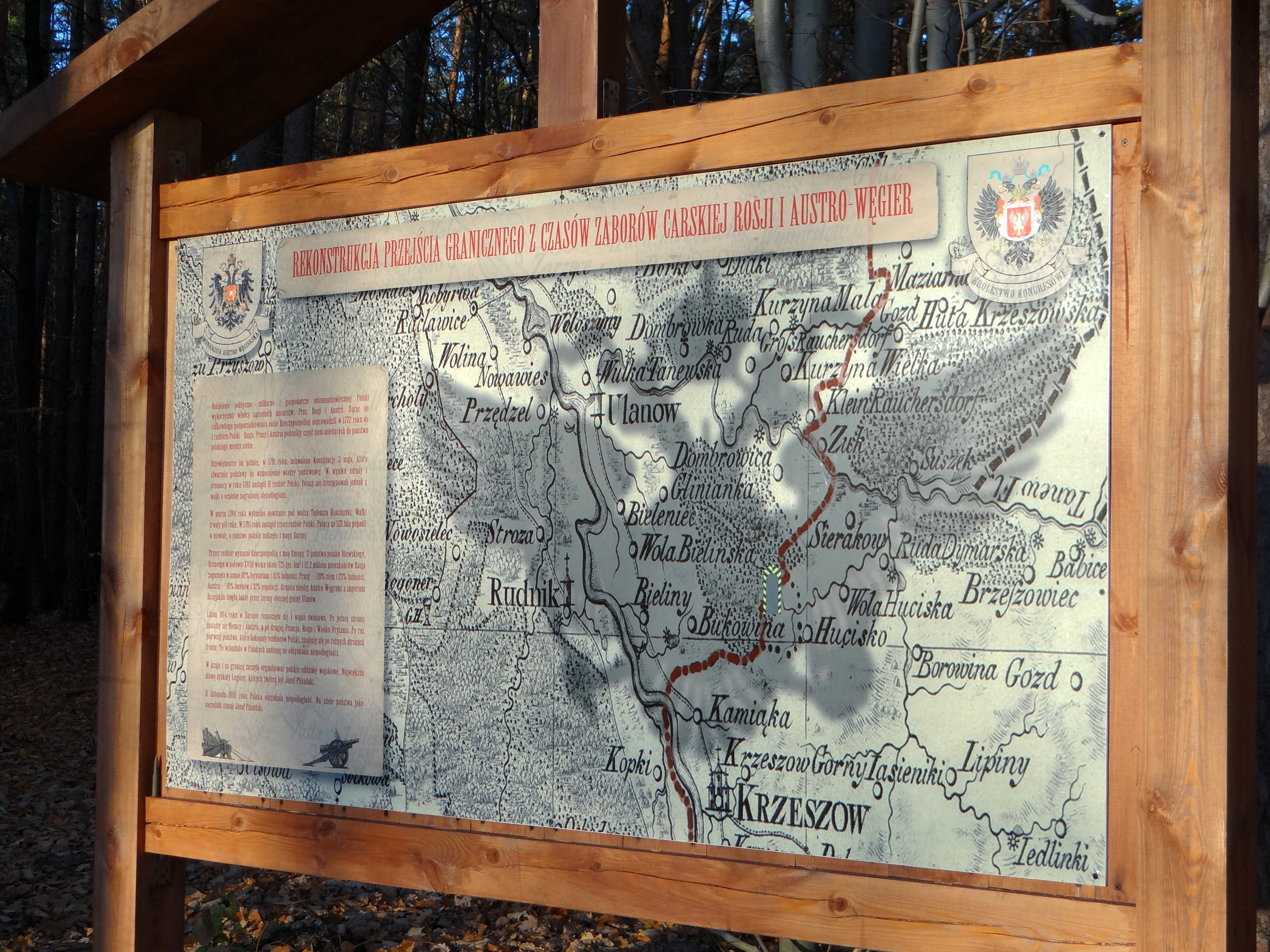
The map showing border line between Austria-Hungary and Congress Poland
