= Dąbrówka, Nisko County =

Dąbrówka
- Village
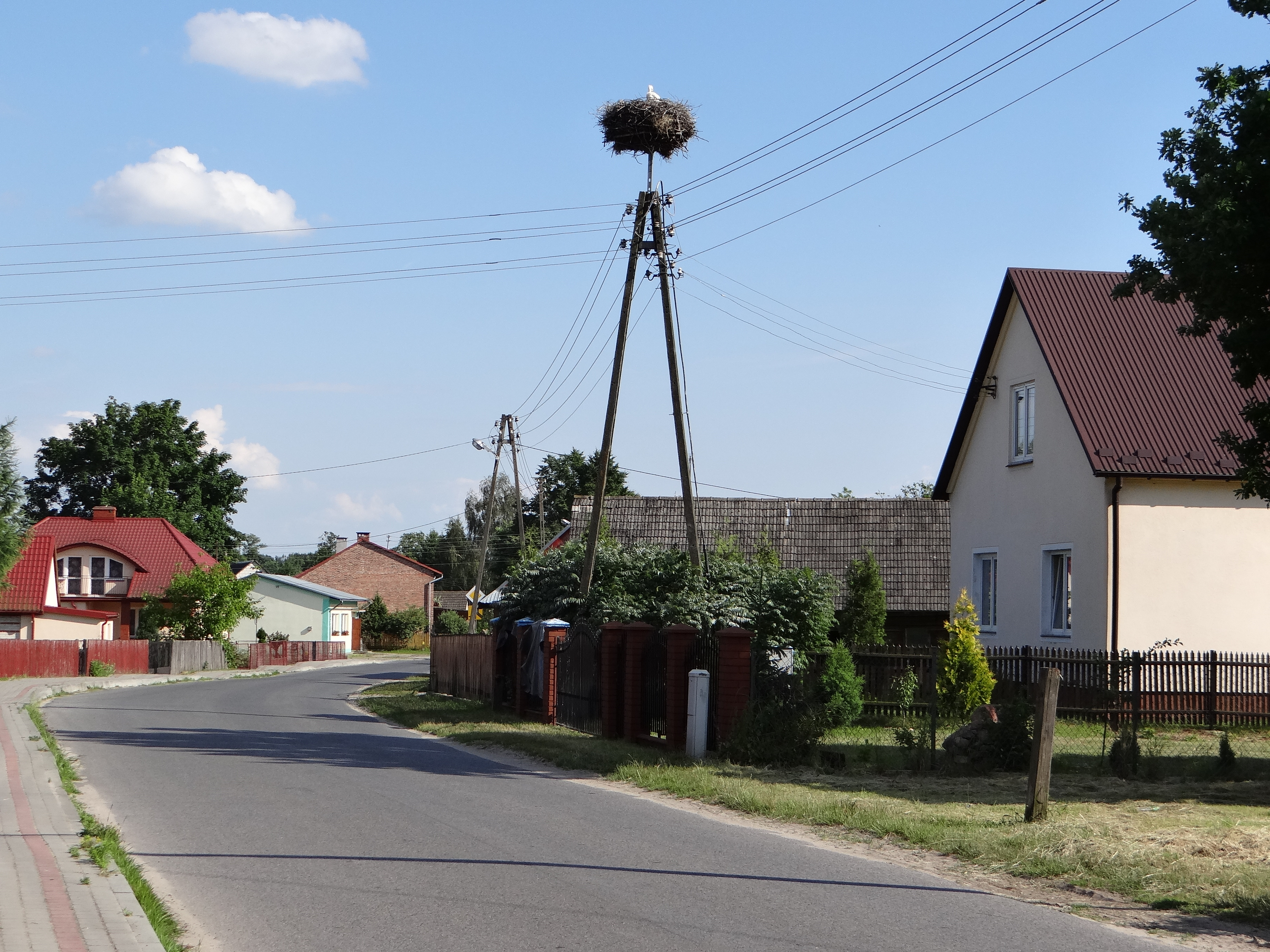

- Location within Poland
- Coordinates: 50°30′N 22°19′E
- Country: Poland
- Voivodeship: Subcarpathian
- County: Nisko
- Gmina: Ulanów
- Time zone: UTC+1 (CET)
  - Summer (DST): UTC+2 (CEST)
- Vehicle registration: RNI

Dąbrówka [dɔmˈbrufka] is a village in the administrative district of Gmina Ulanów, within Nisko County, Subcarpathian Voivodeship, in south-eastern Poland.

Two Polish citizens were murdered by Nazi Germany in the village during World War II.
