= Bieliny, Podkarpackie Voivodeship =

Bieliny
- Village
- Location within Poland
- Coordinates: 50°26′43″N 22°17′30″E
- Country: Poland
- Voivodeship: Subcarpathian
- County: Nisko
- Gmina: Ulanów

Bieliny [bʲɛˈlʲinɨ] is a village in the administrative district of Gmina Ulanów, within Nisko County, Subcarpathian Voivodeship, in south-eastern Poland.
