= Glinianka, Podkarpackie Voivodeship =

Glinianka
- Village
- Location within Poland
- Coordinates: 50°28′28″N 22°18′25″E
- Country: Poland
- Voivode: Mazovia
- County: Nisko
- Gmina: Wiązowna
- Population: 600

Glinianka [ɡlʲiˈɲaŋka] is a village in the administrative district of Gmina Wiązowna, within Nisko County, Mazovian Voivodeship, in south-eastern Poland. The village last recorded a population of about 600 people.
