= Dereźnia =

Dereźnia may refer to the following places in Poland:

- Dereźnia Majdańska
- Dereźnia Solska
- Dereźnia-Zagrody
