= Smólsko =

Smólsko may refer to the following places in Poland:

- Smólsko, Łobez County
- Smólsko, Myślibórz County
- Smólsko Duże
- Smólsko Małe
