= Teodorówka =

Teodorówka may refer to the following places:

- Teodorówka, Gmina Biłgoraj in Lublin Voivodeship (east Poland)
- Teodorówka, Gmina Frampol in Lublin Voivodeship (east Poland)
- Teodorówka, Subcarpathian Voivodeship (south-east Poland)
- Teodorówka, Masovian Voivodeship (east-central Poland)
- Teodorówka, Opole Voivodeship (south-west Poland)
