= Andrzejówka =

Andrzejówka may refer to the following places:

- Andrzejówka, Łódź Voivodeship (central Poland)
- Andrzejówka, Biłgoraj County in Lublin Voivodeship (east Poland)
- Andrzejówka, Hrubieszów County in Lublin Voivodeship (east Poland)
- Andrzejówka, Lesser Poland Voivodeship (south Poland)
- Andrzejówka, Masovian Voivodeship (east-central Poland)
