= Bidaczów =

Bidaczów may refer to the following places in Poland:

- Nowy Bidaczów
- Stary Bidaczów
