= Lipiny Dolne =

- Village
- Location within Poland
- Coordinates: 50°25′N 22°28′E
- Country: Poland
- Voivodeship: Lublin
- County: Biłgoraj
- Gmina: Potok Górny

Population
  - Total: 1,120

Lipiny Dolne [liˈpinɨ ˈdɔlnɛ] is a village in the administrative district of Gmina Potok Górny, within Biłgoraj County, Lublin Voivodeship, in eastern Poland.
