= Lipowiec, Biłgoraj County =

Lipowiec
- Village
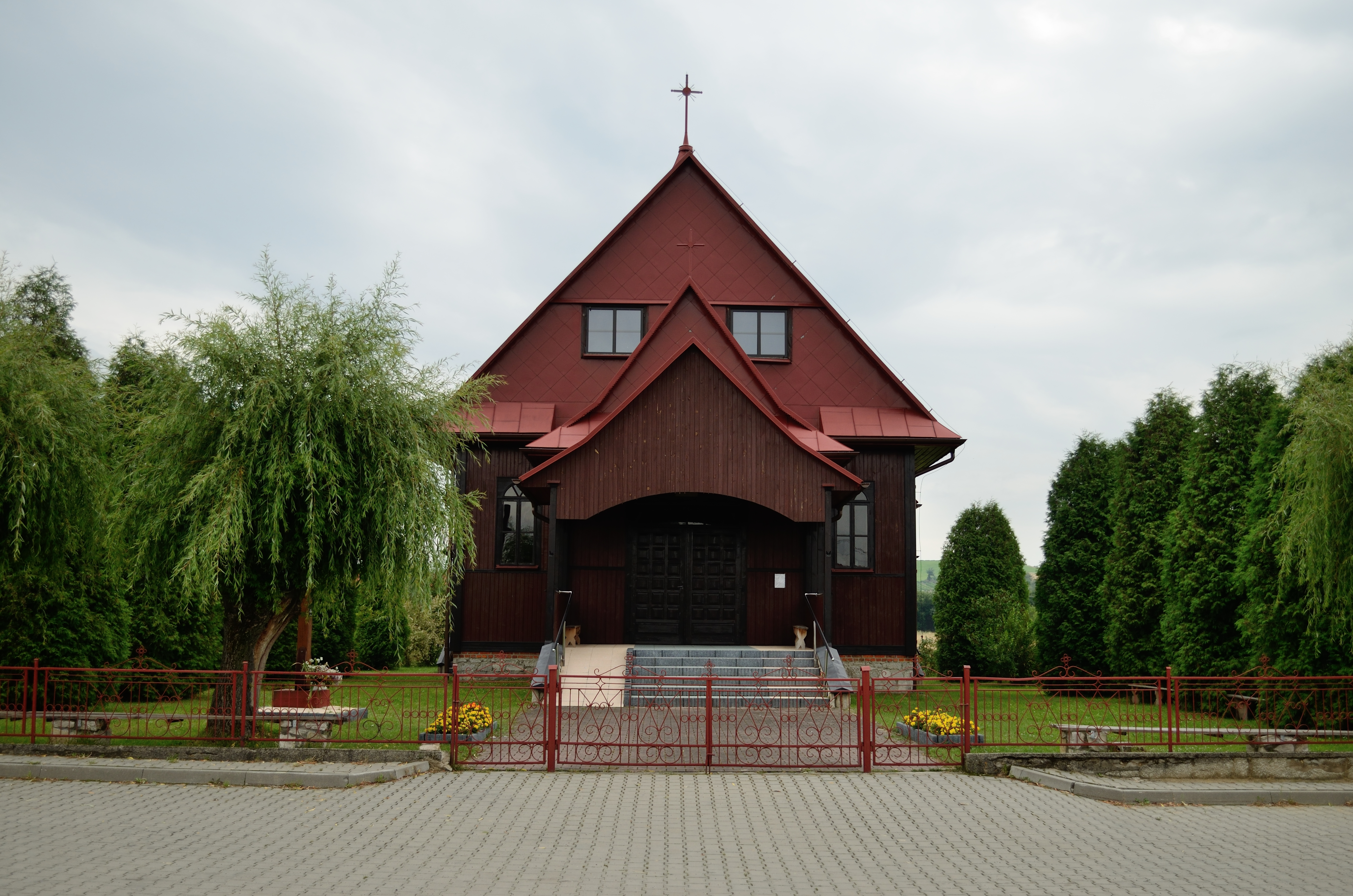
- Divine Mercy church in Lipowiec

- Location within Poland
- Coordinates: 50°37′N 22°51′E
- Country: Poland
- Voivodeship: Lublin
- County: Biłgoraj
- Gmina: Tereszpol

Population
  - Total: 570
- Time zone: UTC+1 (CET)
  - Summer (DST): UTC+2 (CEST)

Lipowiec [liˈpɔvjɛt͡s] is a village in the administrative district of Gmina Tereszpol, within Biłgoraj County, Lublin Voivodeship, in eastern Poland.

== History ==
Nine Polish citizens were murdered by Nazi Germany in the village during World War II.
