= Genowefa Tokarska =

Polish politician (born 1949)

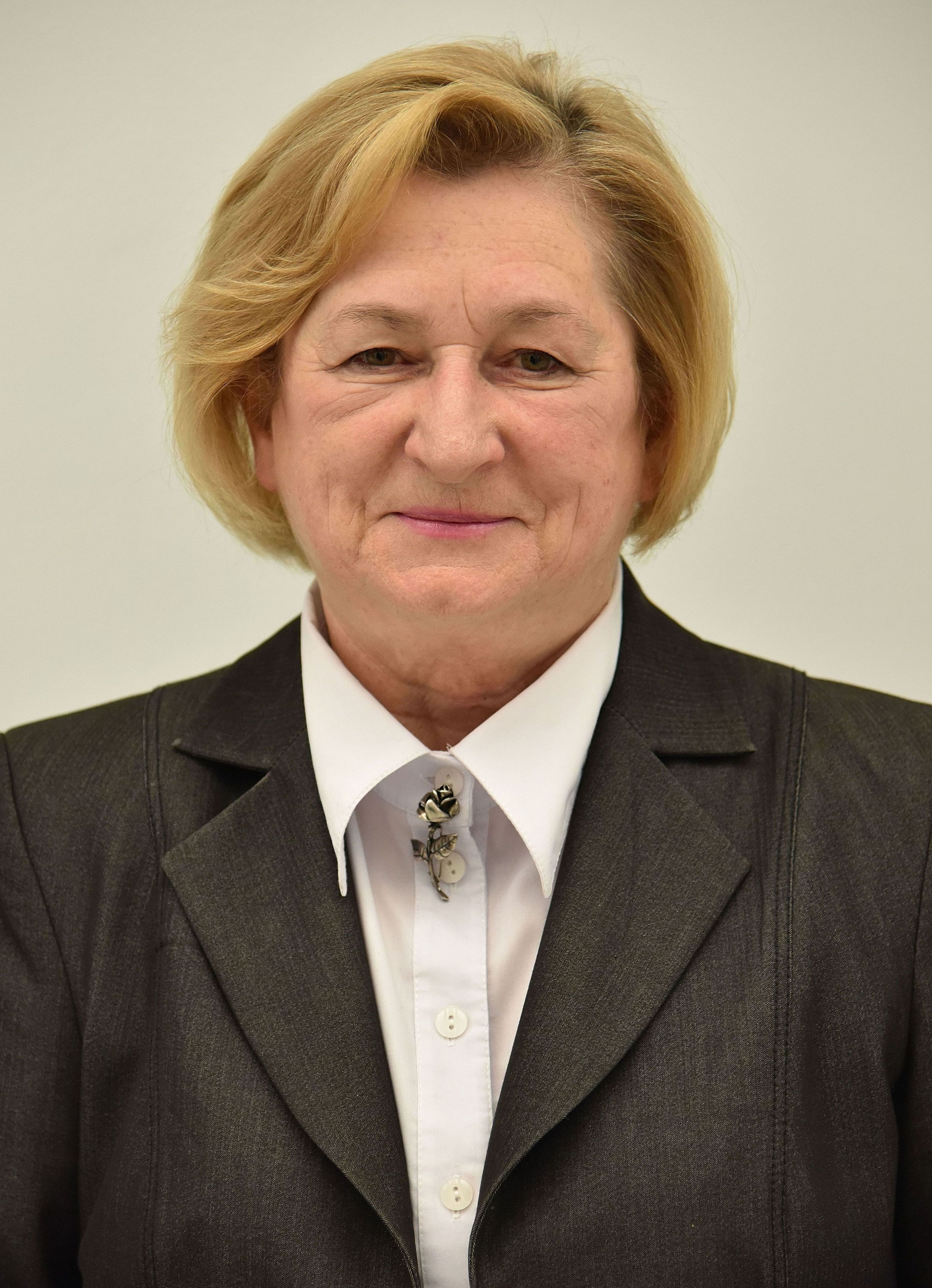

Member of Sejm
- In office 8 November 2011 – 2019

Voivode of Lublin Voivodeship
- In office 29 November 2007 – 26 October 2011
- Preceded by: Wojciech Żukowski
- Succeeded by: Jolanta Szołno-Koguc

Personal details
- Born: 5 August 1949 (age 77) Biszcza, Poland
- Party: Polish People's Party
- Spouse: Starosta Biłgorajski
- Website: http://www.genowefatokarska.pl/

Genowefa Tokarska, née Bzdyra (born 5 August 1949) is a Polish politician who served as a member of the Sejm from 2011 to 2019. Born in Biszcza, she graduated from the University of Life Sciences in Lublin, then the Lublin Agricultural Academy, and in 1989 graduated from the Warsaw School of Economics. After graduating from Lublin, she became a teacher at an agricultural school in Różaniec from 1972 to 1978, then worked at a bank in Księżpol, serving as its director from 1981 to 1990.

In 1990, Tokarska became mayor of Gmina Biszcza, and served five terms in that role. In 2007, she was appointed Voivode of Lublin Voivodeship. After serving a term as voivode, she was selected by the Polish People's Party as a candidate for the Sejm out of Chełm, and as elected with 8,906 votes; she was re-elected to the same position in 2015 with 4,606 votes. On the Sejm, Tokarska serves on the Public Finance Committee. She also ran in the 2014 European Parliament elections, finishing fifth to Krzysztof Hetman out of ten candidates with 6,123 votes. During her second term, she spearheaded a 16 million zł ($4145077.72) expansion of the Museum of John Paul II and Primate Wyszyński.
