= Ciosmy =

- Village
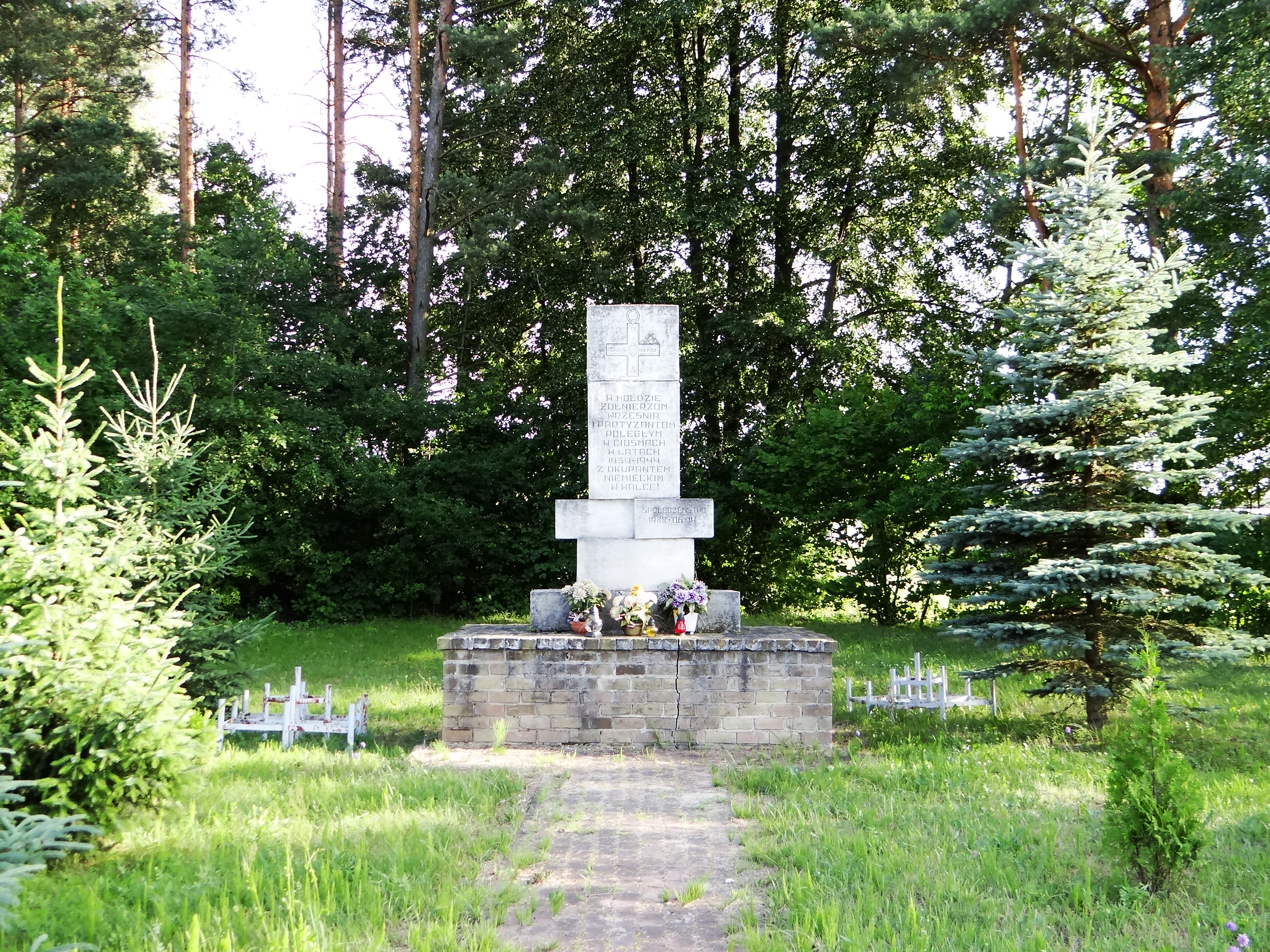
- A picture of Ciosmy village

- Location within Poland
- Coordinates: 50°32′41″N 22°33′6″E
- Country: Poland
- Voivodeship: Lublin
- County: Biłgoraj
- Gmina: Biłgoraj

Population
  - Total: 376

Ciosmy [ˈt͡ɕɔsmɨ] is a village in the administrative district of Gmina Biłgoraj, within Biłgoraj County, Lublin Voivodeship, in eastern Poland.
