= Żary, Lublin Voivodeship =

Żary
- Village
- Location within Poland
- Coordinates: 50°26′45″N 22°39′0″E
- Country: Poland
- Voivodeship: Lublin
- County: Biłgoraj
- Gmina: Biszcza

Population
  - Total: 38

Żary [ˈʐarɨ] is a village in the administrative district of Gmina Biszcza, within Biłgoraj County, Lublin Voivodeship, in eastern Poland.
