= Zagródki, Lublin Voivodeship =

Zagródki
- Village
- Location within Poland
- Coordinates: 50°21′42″N 22°34′15″E
- Country: Poland
- Voivodeship: Lublin
- County: Biłgoraj
- Gmina: Potok Górny

Population
  - Total: 330

Zagródki [zaˈɡrutki] is a village in the administrative district of Gmina Potok Górny, within Biłgoraj County, Lublin Voivodeship, in eastern Poland.
