= Kąty, Biłgoraj County =

Kąty
- Village
- Location within Poland
- Coordinates: 50°39′5″N 22°43′26″E
- Country: Poland
- Voivodeship: Lublin
- County: Biłgoraj
- Gmina: Frampol

Population
  - Total: 269

Kąty [ˈkɔntɨ] is a village in the administrative district of Gmina Frampol, within Biłgoraj County, Lublin Voivodeship, in eastern Poland.
