= Sigła =

- Village
- Location within Poland
- Coordinates: 50°27′48″N 22°57′0″E
- Country: Poland
- Voivodeship: Lublin
- County: Biłgoraj
- Gmina: Aleksandrów

Population
  - Total: 15

Sigła [ˈɕiɡwa] is a village in the administrative district of Gmina Aleksandrów, within Biłgoraj County, Lublin Voivodeship, in eastern Poland.
