= Jedlinki =

- Village
- Location within Poland
- Coordinates: 50°24′N 22°33′E
- Country: Poland
- Voivodeship: Lublin
- County: Biłgoraj
- Gmina: Potok Górny

Population
  - Total: 161

Jedlinki [jɛˈdlinki] is a village in the administrative district of Gmina Potok Górny, within Biłgoraj County, Lublin Voivodeship, in eastern Poland.
