= Pisklaki =

- Village
- Location within Poland
- Coordinates: 50°24′48″N 22°52′39″E
- Country: Poland
- Voivodeship: Lublin
- County: Biłgoraj
- Gmina: Łukowa

Population
  - Total: 254

Pisklaki [pisˈklaki] is a village in the administrative district of Gmina Łukowa, within Biłgoraj County, Lublin Voivodeship, in eastern Poland.
