= Wola Kątecka =

- Village
- Location within Poland
- Coordinates: 50°39′36″N 22°44′18″E
- Country: Poland
- Voivodeship: Lublin
- County: Biłgoraj
- Gmina: Frampol

Population
  - Total: 155

Wola Kątecka [ˈvɔla kɔnˈtɛt͡ska] is a village in the administrative district of Gmina Frampol, within Biłgoraj County, Lublin Voivodeship, in eastern Poland.
