= Karolówka =

Karolówka may refer to the following places:

- Karolówka, Lublin Voivodeship (east Poland)
- Karolówka, Opole Voivodeship (south-west Poland)
- Karolówka, Subcarpathian Voivodeship (south-east Poland)
