= Nowy Bidaczów =

- Village
- Location within Poland
- Coordinates: 50°29′N 22°37′E
- Country: Poland
- Voivodeship: Lublin
- County: Biłgoraj
- Gmina: Biłgoraj

Population
  - Total: 148
- Time zone: UTC+1 (CET)
  - Summer (DST): UTC+2 (CEST)
- Vehicle registration: LBL

Nowy Bidaczów [ˈnɔvɨ biˈdat͡ʂuf] is a village in the administrative district of Gmina Biłgoraj, within Biłgoraj County, Lublin Voivodeship, in eastern Poland.

== History ==
Nowy Bidaczów was part of the Zamoyski family entail. In 1827, the villages of Nowy Bidaczów and Stary Bidaczów had a combined population of 289.

Following the joint German-Soviet invasion of Poland, which started World War II in September 1939, the village was occupied by Germany until 1945. On October 6, 1942, the Gestapo and SS carried out a massacre of 22 Polish farmers, as punishment for rescuing Jews from the Holocaust.
