= Poręby, Lublin Voivodeship =

Poręby
- Village
- Location within Poland
- Coordinates: 50°35′49″N 22°52′53″E
- Country: Poland
- Voivodeship: Lublin
- County: Biłgoraj
- Gmina: Tereszpol

Poręby [pɔˈrɛmbɨ] is a village in the administrative district of Gmina Tereszpol, within Biłgoraj County, Lublin Voivodeship, in eastern Poland.
