= Podlas, Lublin Voivodeship =

Podlas
- Village
- Location within Poland
- Coordinates: 50°26′26″N 22°55′36″E
- Country: Poland
- Voivodeship: Lublin
- County: Biłgoraj
- Gmina: Aleksandrów

Population
  - Total: 34

Podlas [ˈpɔdlas] is a village in the administrative district of Gmina Aleksandrów, within Biłgoraj County, Lublin Voivodeship, in eastern Poland.
