= Kozaki Osuchowskie =

- Village
- Location within Poland
- Coordinates: 50°25′56″N 22°57′13″E
- Country: Poland
- Voivodeship: Lublin
- County: Biłgoraj
- Gmina: Łukowa

Population
  - Total: 64

Kozaki Osuchowskie [kɔˈzaki ɔsuˈxɔfskʲɛ] is a village in the administrative district of Gmina Łukowa, within Biłgoraj County, Lublin Voivodeship, in eastern Poland.
