= Nadrzecze, Lublin Voivodeship =

Nadrzecze
- Village
- Location within Poland
- Coordinates: 50°36′N 22°41′E
- Country: Poland
- Voivodeship: Lublin
- County: Biłgoraj
- Gmina: Biłgoraj

Population
  - Total: 198

Nadrzecze [naˈdʐɛt͡ʂɛ] is a village in the administrative district of Gmina Biłgoraj, within Biłgoraj County, Lublin Voivodeship, in eastern Poland.
