= Lipiny Dolne-Kolonia =

- Village
- Location within Poland
- Coordinates: 50°24′01″N 22°30′02″E
- Country: Poland
- Voivodeship: Lublin
- County: Biłgoraj
- Gmina: Potok Górny

Lipiny Dolne-Kolonia [liˈpinɨ ˈdɔlnɛ kɔˈlɔɲa] is a village in the administrative district of Gmina Potok Górny, within Biłgoraj County, Lublin Voivodeship, in eastern Poland.
