= Korytków Duży =

- Village
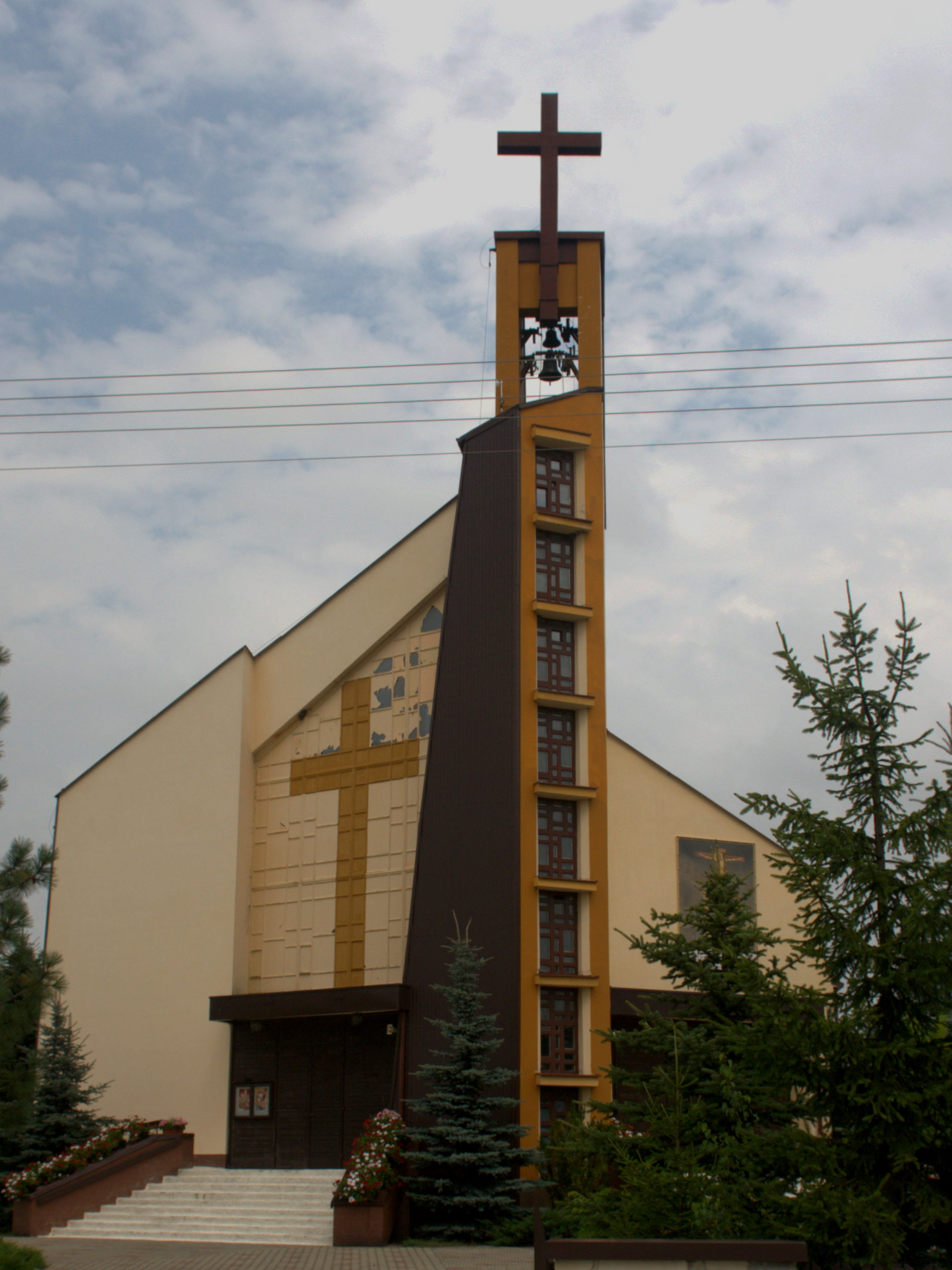
- Church of Our Lady of Sorrows, Korytków Duży

- Location within Poland
- Coordinates: 50°36′N 22°40′E
- Country: Poland
- Voivodeship: Lublin
- County: Biłgoraj
- Gmina: Biłgoraj

Population
  - Total: 683

Korytków Duży [kɔˈrɨtkuf ˈduʐɨ] is a village in the administrative district of Gmina Biłgoraj, within Biłgoraj County, Lublin Voivodeship, in eastern Poland.
