= Szyszków =

Szyszków may refer to the following places:

- Szyszków, Lublin Voivodeship (east Poland)
- Szyszków, Opole Voivodeship (south-west Poland)
- Szyszków, Silesian Voivodeship (south Poland)
