= Brodziaki =

- Village
- Location within Poland
- Coordinates: 50°30′N 22°47′E
- Country: Poland
- Voivodeship: Lublin
- County: Biłgoraj
- Gmina: Biłgoraj

Population
  - Total: 101

Brodziaki [brɔˈd͡ʑaki] is a village in the administrative district of Gmina Biłgoraj, within Biłgoraj County, Lublin Voivodeship, in eastern Poland.
