= Suszka, Lublin Voivodeship =

Suszka
- Village
- Location within Poland
- Coordinates: 50°27′35″N 22°34′54″E
- Country: Poland
- Voivodeship: Lublin
- County: Biłgoraj
- Gmina: Biszcza

Population
  - Total: 11

Suszka [ˈsuʂka] is a village in the administrative district of Gmina Biszcza, within Biłgoraj County, Lublin Voivodeship, in eastern Poland.
