= Ignatówka, Lublin Voivodeship =

Ignatówka
- Village
- Location within Poland
- Coordinates: 50°37′2″N 22°46′45″E
- Country: Poland
- Voivodeship: Lublin
- County: Biłgoraj
- Gmina: Biłgoraj

Population
  - Total: 84

Ignatówka [iɡnaˈtufka] is a village in the administrative district of Gmina Biłgoraj, within Biłgoraj County, Lublin Voivodeship, in eastern Poland.
