= Wola Kulońska =

- Village
- Location within Poland
- Coordinates: 50°22′5″N 22°37′22″E
- Country: Poland
- Voivodeship: Lublin
- County: Biłgoraj
- Gmina: Biszcza

Population
  - Total: 83

Wola Kulońska [ˈvɔla kuˈlɔɲska] is a village in the administrative district of Gmina Biszcza, within Biłgoraj County, Lublin Voivodeship, in eastern Poland.
