= Wola Dereźniańska =

- Village
- Location within Poland
- Coordinates: 50°28′52″N 22°40′1″E
- Country: Poland
- Voivodeship: Lublin
- County: Biłgoraj
- Gmina: Biłgoraj

Population
  - Total: 386

Wola Dereźniańska [ˈvɔla dɛrɛʑˈɲaɲska] is a village in the administrative district of Gmina Biłgoraj, within Biłgoraj County, Lublin Voivodeship, in eastern Poland.
