= Stara Wieś, Biłgoraj County =

Stara Wieś
- Village
- Location within Poland
- Coordinates: 50°40′32″N 22°42′38″E
- Country: Poland
- Voivodeship: Lublin
- County: Biłgoraj
- Gmina: Frampol

Population
  - Total: 220

Stara Wieś [ˈstara ˈvjɛɕ] is a village in the administrative district of Gmina Frampol, within Biłgoraj County, Lublin Voivodeship, in eastern Poland.
