= Teodorówka-Kolonia =

- Village
- Location within Poland
- Coordinates: 50°40′46″N 22°45′41″E
- Country: Poland
- Voivodeship: Lublin
- County: Biłgoraj
- Gmina: Frampol

Population
  - Total: 171

Teodorówka-Kolonia [tɛɔdɔˈrufka kɔˈlɔɲa] is a village in the administrative district of Gmina Frampol, within Biłgoraj County, Lublin Voivodeship, in eastern Poland.
