= Kajetanówka, Biłgoraj County =

Kajetanówka
- Village
- Location within Poland
- Coordinates: 50°36′57″N 22°49′21″E
- Country: Poland
- Voivodeship: Lublin
- County: Biłgoraj
- Gmina: Biłgoraj

Population
  - Total: 132

Kajetanówka [kajɛtaˈnufka] is a village in the administrative district of Gmina Biłgoraj, within Biłgoraj County, Lublin Voivodeship, in eastern Poland.
