= Komodzianka =

- Village
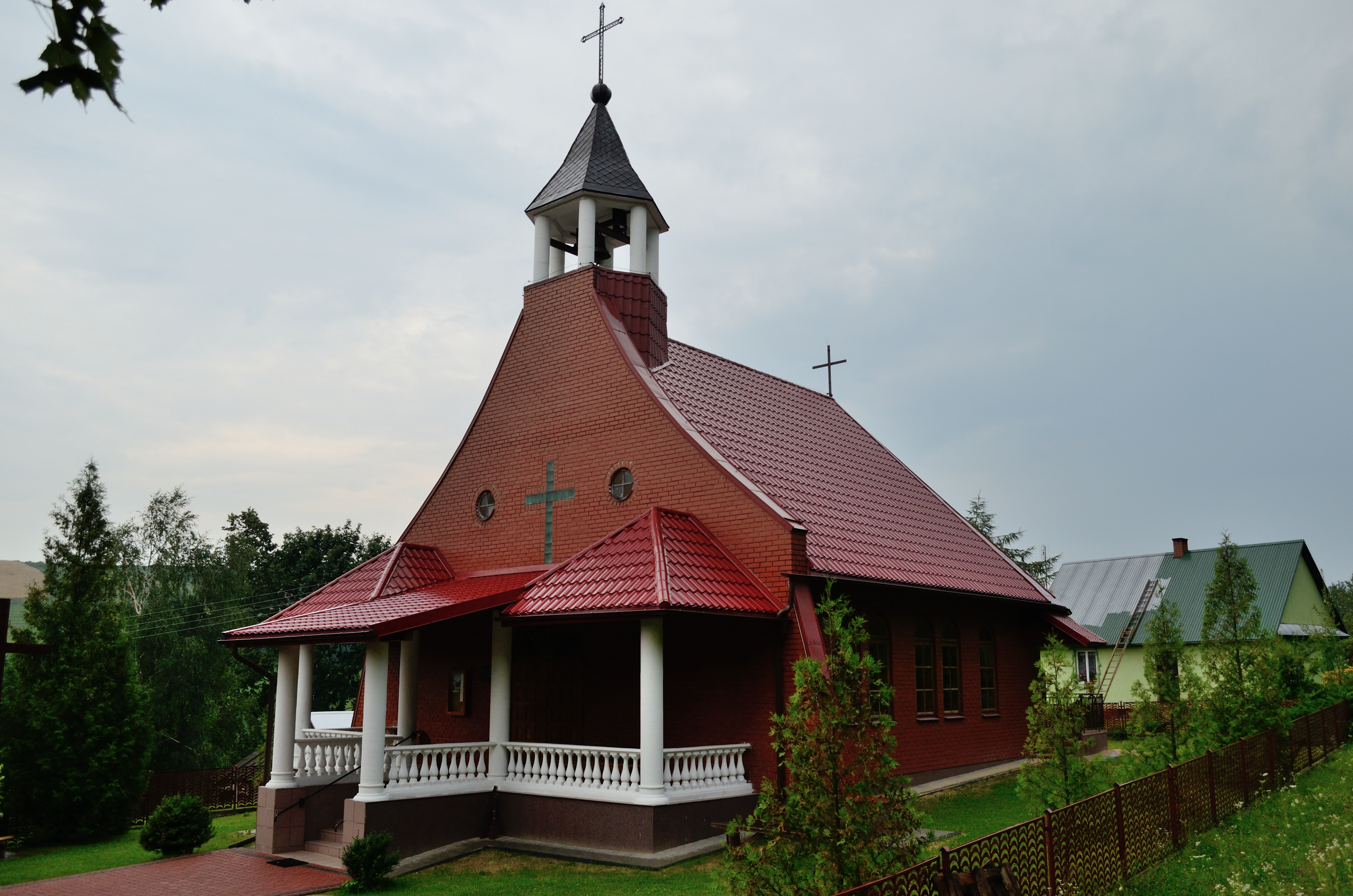
- Church in Komodzianka

- Location within Poland
- Coordinates: 50°42′N 22°48′E
- Country: Poland
- Voivodeship: Lublin
- County: Biłgoraj
- Gmina: Frampol
- Highest elevation: 320 m (1,050 ft)
- Lowest elevation: 260 m (850 ft)

Population
  - Total: 322
- Time zone: UTC+1 (CET)
  - Summer (DST): UTC+2 (CEST)

Komodzianka [kɔmɔˈd͡ʑanka] is a village in the administrative district of Gmina Frampol, within Biłgoraj County, Lublin Voivodeship, in eastern Poland.

== History ==
Four Polish citizens were murdered by Nazi Germany in the village during World War II.
