= Dąbrowica =

Dąbrowica may refer to:

- Dąbrowica, Jelenia Góra County in Lower Silesian Voivodeship (south-west Poland)
- Dąbrowica, Wrocław County in Lower Silesian Voivodeship (south-west Poland)
- Dąbrowica, Biłgoraj County in Lublin Voivodeship (east Poland)
- Dąbrowica, Janów County in Lublin Voivodeship (east Poland)
- Dąbrowica, Lublin County in Lublin Voivodeship (east Poland)
- Dąbrowica, Bochnia County in Lesser Poland Voivodeship (south Poland)
- Dąbrowica, Dąbrowa County in Lesser Poland Voivodeship (south Poland)
- Dąbrowica, Świętokrzyskie Voivodeship (south-central Poland)
- Dąbrowica, Leżajsk County in Subcarpathian Voivodeship (south-east Poland)
- Dąbrowica, Nisko County in Subcarpathian Voivodeship (south-east Poland)
- Dąbrowica, Tarnobrzeg County in Subcarpathian Voivodeship (south-east Poland)
- Dąbrowica, Masovian Voivodeship (east-central Poland)
- Dąbrowica, Konin County in Greater Poland Voivodeship (west-central Poland)
- Dąbrowica, Turek County in Greater Poland Voivodeship (west-central Poland)
- Dąbrowica, Goleniów County in West Pomeranian Voivodeship (north-west Poland)
- Dąbrowica, Szczecinek County in West Pomeranian Voivodeship (north-west Poland)

== See also ==
- Dubrovytsia, a town in Rivne Oblast, Ukraine, and site of the Jewish shtetl Dombrovza
