= Battle of Kobylanka =

- Part of the January Uprising
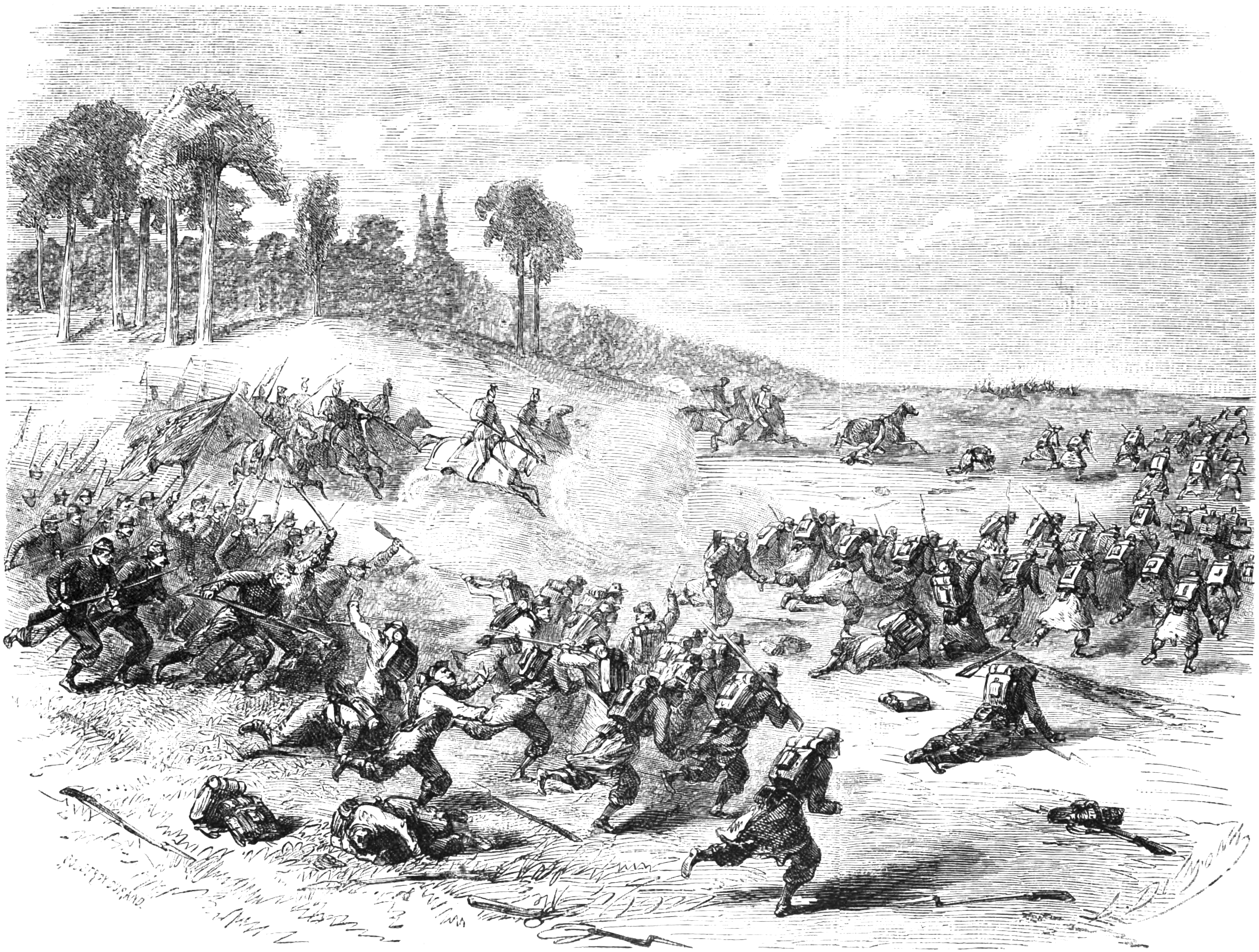
- Battle of Kobylanka on the sketch of French artist Louis Dumont (1863)
Date	1 and 6 May 1863
Location	Kobylanka Forest near Borowiec, Lublin Voivodeship, Poland
Result	Polish victory

Belligerents
(Poland) Polish Insurgents	Russian Empire

Commanders and leaders
General Antoni Jeziorański	Major Iwan Sternberg; Lieutenant Colonel Gieorgij Miednikow

Strength
740 (1 May); 820 (6 May)	1,000 (1 May); 2,000 (6 May)

The Battle of Kobylanka, one of many skirmishes of the January Uprising, took place on 1 and 6 May 1863 in the Kobylanka Forest, located near the village of Borowiec, which at that time belonged to Russian-controlled Congress Poland. A Polish insurgent party of some 800, under Antoni Jezioranski, clashed here with a 1000-strong unit of the Imperial Russian Army.

On 28 April an insurgent party from Galicia, commanded by General Jasinski crossed Austrian/Russian border near the village of Ruda Rozaniecka. Russian Army Colonel Georgi Mednikov, who was military commandant of Janow Lubelski County, decided to send a detachment towards Ruda. Altogether, the Russian unit consisted of 1000 soldiers, including infantry, uhlans, Cossacks, border guards and two cannons.

On 1 May the Russians, led by Major Ivan Sternberg, attacked Jasinski and his men. The insurgents were well-armed, but did not have enough ammunition. Russian attack was halted by the Poles, and Sternberg ordered a retreat to Borowe Mlyny. There, his forces were strengthened with four infantry companies and other units, and as a result, Russian detachment had 2000 soldiers. Jezioranski also reinforced his party, with two cavalry battalions and rebels from the unit of Marcin Borelowski. Nevertheless, the Russians still had a 3 to 1 advantage.

On 6 May the Russians attacked insurgent camp, pushing the insurgents towards its center. After a fierce battle, in which Poles used bayonets, the Russians were pushed back by the afternoon. Altogether, Poles lost 150 men (killed and wounded). Among those killed were Jezioranski himself. Russians losses are unknown, but include at least two combat unicorns. Colonel Mednikov later reported 150 killed, but this number was probably much higher.

== Sources ==
- Stefan Kieniewicz: Powstanie styczniowe. Warszawa: Państwowe Wydawnictwo Naukowe, 1983. ISBN 83-01-03652-4.
