= Korytków Mały =

- Village
- Location within Poland
- Coordinates: 50°37′N 22°40′E
- Country: Poland
- Voivodeship: Lublin
- County: Biłgoraj
- Gmina: Frampol

Population
  - Total: 427

Korytków Mały [kɔˈrɨtkuf ˈmawɨ] is a village in the administrative district of Gmina Frampol, within Biłgoraj County, Lublin Voivodeship, in eastern Poland.
