= Hedwiżyn =

- Village
- Location within Poland
- Coordinates: 50°35′2″N 22°48′30″E
- Country: Poland
- Voivodeship: Lublin
- County: Biłgoraj
- Gmina: Biłgoraj

Population
  - Total: 616

Hedwiżyn [xɛdˈviʐɨn] is a village in the administrative district of Gmina Biłgoraj, within Biłgoraj County, Lublin Voivodeship, in eastern Poland.
