= Tereszpol-Kukiełki =

- Village
- Location within Poland
- Coordinates: 50°33′10″N 22°55′52″E
- Country: Poland
- Voivodeship: Lublin
- County: Biłgoraj
- Gmina: Tereszpol

Population
  - Total: 919

Tereszpol-Kukiełki [tɛˈrɛʂpɔl kuˈkʲɛu̯ki] is a village in the administrative district of Gmina Tereszpol, within Biłgoraj County, Lublin Voivodeship, in eastern Poland.
