= Kolonia Malennik =

- Village
- Location within Poland
- Coordinates: 50°24′36″N 22°24′58″E
- Country: Poland
- Voivodeship: Lublin
- County: Biłgoraj
- Gmina: Potok Górny

Population
  - Total: 100

Kolonia Malennik [kɔˈlɔɲa maˈlɛnnik] is a village in the administrative district of Gmina Potok Górny, within Biłgoraj County, Lublin Voivodeship, in eastern Poland.
