= Wólka Biska =

- Village
- Location within Poland
- Coordinates: 50°26′59″N 22°36′30″E
- Country: Poland
- Voivodeship: Lublin
- County: Biłgoraj
- Gmina: Biszcza

Population
  - Total: 144

Wólka Biska [ˈvulka ˈbiska] is a village in the administrative district of Gmina Biszcza, within Biłgoraj County, Lublin Voivodeship, in eastern Poland.
