= Edwardów =

Edwardów may refer to the following places in Poland:

- Edwardów, Lower Silesian Voivodeship (south-west Poland)
- Edwardów, Biłgoraj County in Lublin Voivodeship (east Poland)
- Edwardów, Ryki County in Lublin Voivodeship (east Poland)
- Edwardów, Grójec County in Masovian Voivodeship (east-central Poland)
- Edwardów, Kozienice County in Masovian Voivodeship (east-central Poland)
- Edwardów, Radom County in Masovian Voivodeship (east-central Poland)
