= Tereszpol-Zygmunty =

- Village
- Location within Poland
- Coordinates: 50°33′48″N 22°54′40″E
- Country: Poland
- Voivodeship: Lublin
- County: Biłgoraj
- Gmina: Tereszpol

Population
  - Total: 766

Tereszpol-Zygmunty [tɛˈrɛʂpɔl zɨɡˈmuntɨ] is a village in Biłgoraj County, Lublin Voivodeship, in eastern Poland.

On 2 May 2021, An F2 tornado caused major damage in the village. Several buildings were damaged or destroyed.
