= Szostaki, Biłgoraj County =

Szostaki
- Village
- Location within Poland
- Coordinates: 50°24′43″N 22°54′40″E
- Country: Poland
- Voivodeship: Lublin
- County: Biłgoraj
- Gmina: Łukowa

Population
  - Total: 80

Szostaki [ʂɔsˈtakʲi] is a village in the administrative district of Gmina Łukowa, within Biłgoraj County, Lublin Voivodeship, in eastern Poland.
