= Sokołówka, Lublin Voivodeship =

Sokołówka
- Village
- Location within Poland
- Coordinates: 50°39′14″N 22°41′11″E
- Country: Poland
- Voivodeship: Lublin
- County: Biłgoraj
- Gmina: Frampol

Population
  - Total: 309

Sokołówka [sɔkɔˈwufka] is a village in the administrative district of Gmina Frampol, within Biłgoraj County, Lublin Voivodeship, in eastern Poland.
