= Podsośnina Łukowska =

Village in Lublin Voivodeship, Poland

- Village
- Location within Poland
- Coordinates: 50°23′56″N 22°55′47″E
- Country: Poland
- Voivodeship: Lublin
- County: Biłgoraj
- Gmina: Łukowa

Population
  - Total: 169
- Time zone: UTC+1 (CET)
  - Summer (DST): UTC+2 (CEST)

Podsośnina Łukowska [pɔtsɔɕˈɲina wuˈkɔfska] is a village in the administrative district of Gmina Łukowa, within Biłgoraj County, Lublin Voivodeship, in eastern Poland.

== History ==
Eight Polish citizens were murdered by Nazi Germany in the village during World War II.
