= Gmina Biłgoraj =

Gmina Biłgoraj Biłgoraj Commune
- Gmina
- Interactive map of Gmina Biłgoraj
- Coordinates (Biłgoraj): 50°33′N 22°44′E
- Country: Poland
- Voivodeship: Lublin
- County: Biłgoraj
- Seat: Biłgoraj

Area
  - Total: 262.64 km^{2} (101.41 sq mi)

Population (2006)
  - Total: 12,541
  - Density: 47.750/km^{2} (123.67/sq mi)
- Website: https://www.gminabilgoraj.pl/

Gmina Biłgoraj is a rural gmina (administrative district) in Biłgoraj County, Lublin Voivodeship, in eastern Poland. Its seat is the town of Biłgoraj, although the town is not part of the territory of the gmina.

The gmina covers an area of 262.64 square kilometres (101.4 sq mi), and as of 2006 its total population is 12,541.

== Villages ==
Gmina Biłgoraj contains the villages and settlements of Andrzejówka, Brodziaki, Bukowa, Ciosmy, Cyncynopol, Dąbrowica, Dereźnia Majdańska, Dereźnia Solska, Dereźnia-Zagrody, Dyle, Edwardów, Gromada, Hedwiżyn, Ignatówka, Jachosze, Kajetanówka, Kolonia Sól, Korczów, Korytków Duży, Majdan Gromadzki, Nadrzecze, Nowy Bidaczów, Okrągłe, Podlesie, Rapy Dylańskie, Ratwica, Ruda Solska, Ruda-Zagrody, Smólsko Duże, Smólsko Małe, Sól, Stary Bidaczów, Teodorówka, Wola Dereźniańska, Wola Duża, Wola Mała, Wolaniny, Zagrody Dąbrowickie, Zagumnie and Żelebsko.

== Neighbouring gminas ==
Gmina Biłgoraj is bordered by the town of Biłgoraj and by the gminas of Aleksandrów, Biszcza, Dzwola, Frampol, Harasiuki, Janów Lubelski, Księżpol, Radecznica and Tereszpol.
