= Wola Radzięcka =

- Village
- Location within Poland
- Coordinates: 50°40′9″N 22°43′34″E
- Country: Poland
- Voivodeship: Lublin
- County: Biłgoraj
- Gmina: Frampol

Population
  - Total: 379

Wola Radzięcka [ˈvɔla raˈd͡ʑɛnt͡ska] is a village in the administrative district of Gmina Frampol, within Biłgoraj County, Lublin Voivodeship, in eastern Poland.
