= Cyncynopol =

- Village
- Location within Poland
- Coordinates: 50°36′33″N 22°47′34″E
- Country: Poland
- Voivodeship: Lublin
- County: Biłgoraj
- Gmina: Biłgoraj

Population
  - Total: 36

Cyncynopol [t͡sɨnt͡sɨˈnɔpɔl] is a village in the administrative district of Gmina Biłgoraj, within Biłgoraj County, Lublin Voivodeship, in eastern Pole land.
