= Cacanin =

- Village
- Location within Poland
- Coordinates: 50°39′45″N 22°39′26″E
- Country: Poland
- Voivodeship: Lublin
- County: Biłgoraj
- Gmina: Frampol

Cacanin [t͡saˈt͡sanin] is a village in the administrative district of Gmina Frampol, within Biłgoraj County, Lublin Voivodeship, in eastern Poland.
