= Kolonia Kąty =

- Village
- Location within Poland
- Coordinates: 50°40′N 22°44′E
- Country: Poland
- Voivodeship: Lublin
- County: Biłgoraj
- Gmina: Frampol

Kolonia Kąty [kɔˈlɔɲa ˈkɔntɨ] is a village in the administrative district of Gmina Frampol, within Biłgoraj County, Lublin Voivodeship, in eastern Poland.
