= Majdan Gromadzki =

- Village
- Location within Poland
- Coordinates: 50°35′N 22°42′E
- Country: Poland
- Voivodeship: Lublin
- County: Biłgoraj
- Gmina: Biłgoraj

Population
  - Total: 365

Majdan Gromadzki (Polish pronunciation: [ˈmajdaŋ ɡrɔˈmatskʲi]) is a village in the administrative district of Gmina Biłgoraj, within Biłgoraj County, Lublin Voivodeship, in eastern Poland.
