= Dyle, Poland =

Dyle
- Village
- Location within Poland
- Coordinates: 50°36′21″N 22°47′59″E
- Country: Poland
- Voivodeship: Lublin
- County: Biłgoraj
- Gmina: Biłgoraj

Population
  - Total: 162

Dyle [ˈdɨlɛ] is a village in the administrative district of Gmina Biłgoraj, within Biłgoraj County, Lublin Voivodeship, in eastern Poland.
