= Wola Duża, Biłgoraj County =

Wola Duża
- Village
- Location within Poland
- Coordinates: 50°34′N 22°47′E
- Country: Poland
- Voivodeship: Lublin
- County: Biłgoraj
- Gmina: Biłgoraj
- Elevation: 200 m (660 ft)

Population
  - Total: 106

Wola Duża [ˈvɔla ˈduʐa] is a village in the administrative district of Gmina Biłgoraj, within Biłgoraj County, Lublin Voivodeship, in eastern Poland.
