= Bukowa, Lublin Voivodeship =

Bukowa
- Village
- Location within Poland
- Coordinates: 50°34′54″N 22°33′55″E
- Country: Poland
- Voivodeship: Lublin
- County: Biłgoraj
- Gmina: Biłgoraj

Population
  - Total: 652

Bukowa [buˈkɔva] is a village in the administrative district of Gmina Biłgoraj, within Biłgoraj County, Lublin Voivodeship, in eastern Poland.
