= Bukowina, Biłgoraj County =

Bukowina
- Village
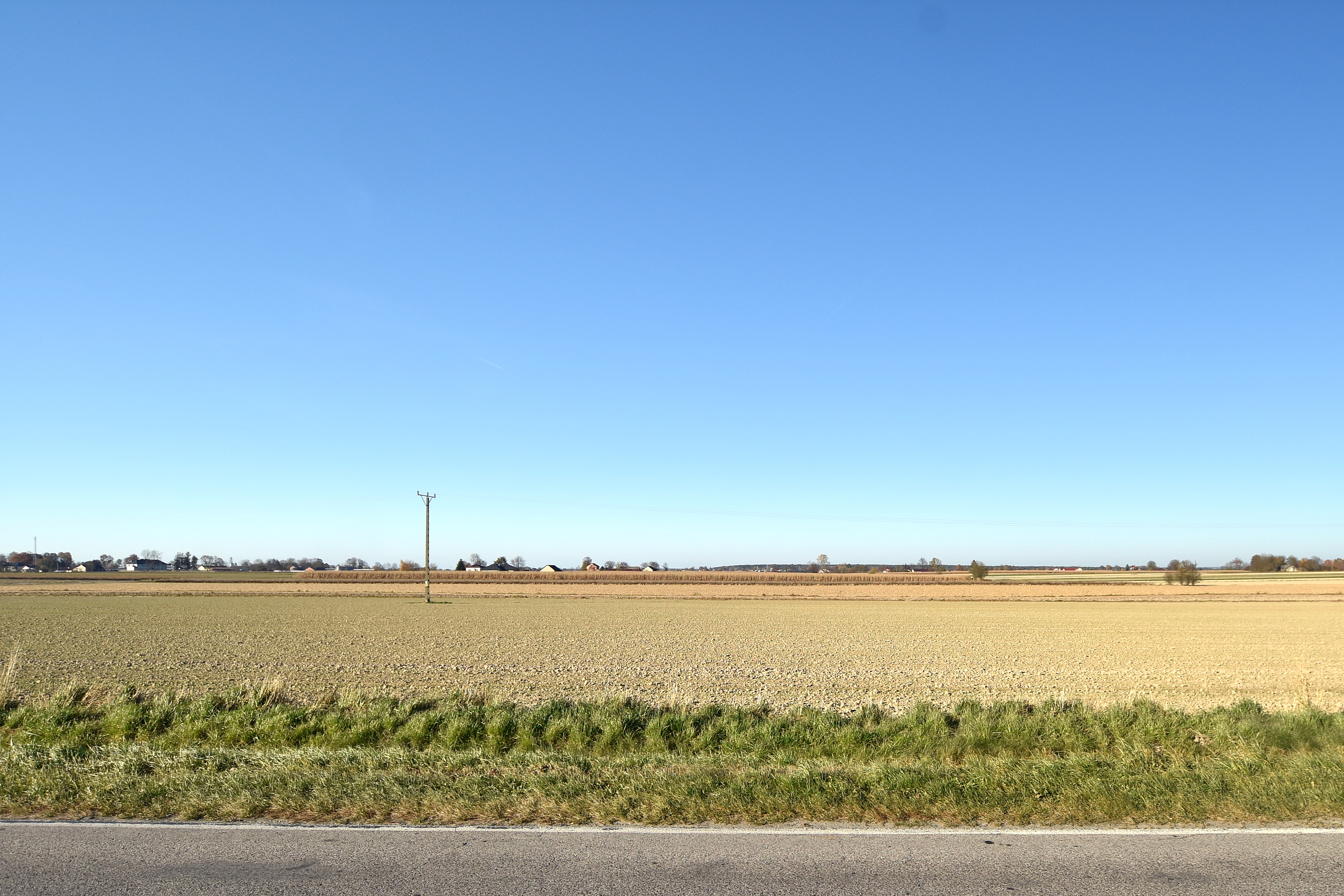

- Location within Poland
- Coordinates: 50°22′37″N 22°40′25″E
- Country: Poland
- Voivodeship: Lublin
- County: Biłgoraj
- Gmina: Biszcza

Population
  - Total: 1,063
- Time zone: UTC+1 (CET)
  - Summer (DST): UTC+2 (CEST)
- Vehicle registration: LBL

Bukowina [bukɔˈvina] is a village in the administrative district of Gmina Biszcza, within Biłgoraj County, Lublin Voivodeship, in south-eastern Poland.

== History ==
Following the German-Soviet invasion of Poland, which started World War II in September 1939, the village was occupied by Germany until 1944. It was the location of four massacres of local Poles. The first massacre, which claimed 11 to 15 victims, was committed by the German SS and Ukrainian Auxiliary Police on 1 July 1943. Further massacres were committed by the Ukrainian auxiliaries on 24 October 1943, 6 January 1944 and 4 July 1944, with six, three and four victims, respectively, including women.
