= Szozdy =

- Village
- Location within Poland
- Coordinates: 50°35′N 22°57′E
- Country: Poland
- Voivodeship: Lublin
- County: Biłgoraj
- Gmina: Tereszpol

Population
  - Total: 265

Szozdy [ˈʂɔzdɨ] is a village in the administrative district of Gmina Tereszpol, within Biłgoraj County, Lublin Voivodeship, in eastern Poland.
