= Dąbrówka, Biłgoraj County =

Dąbrówka
- Village
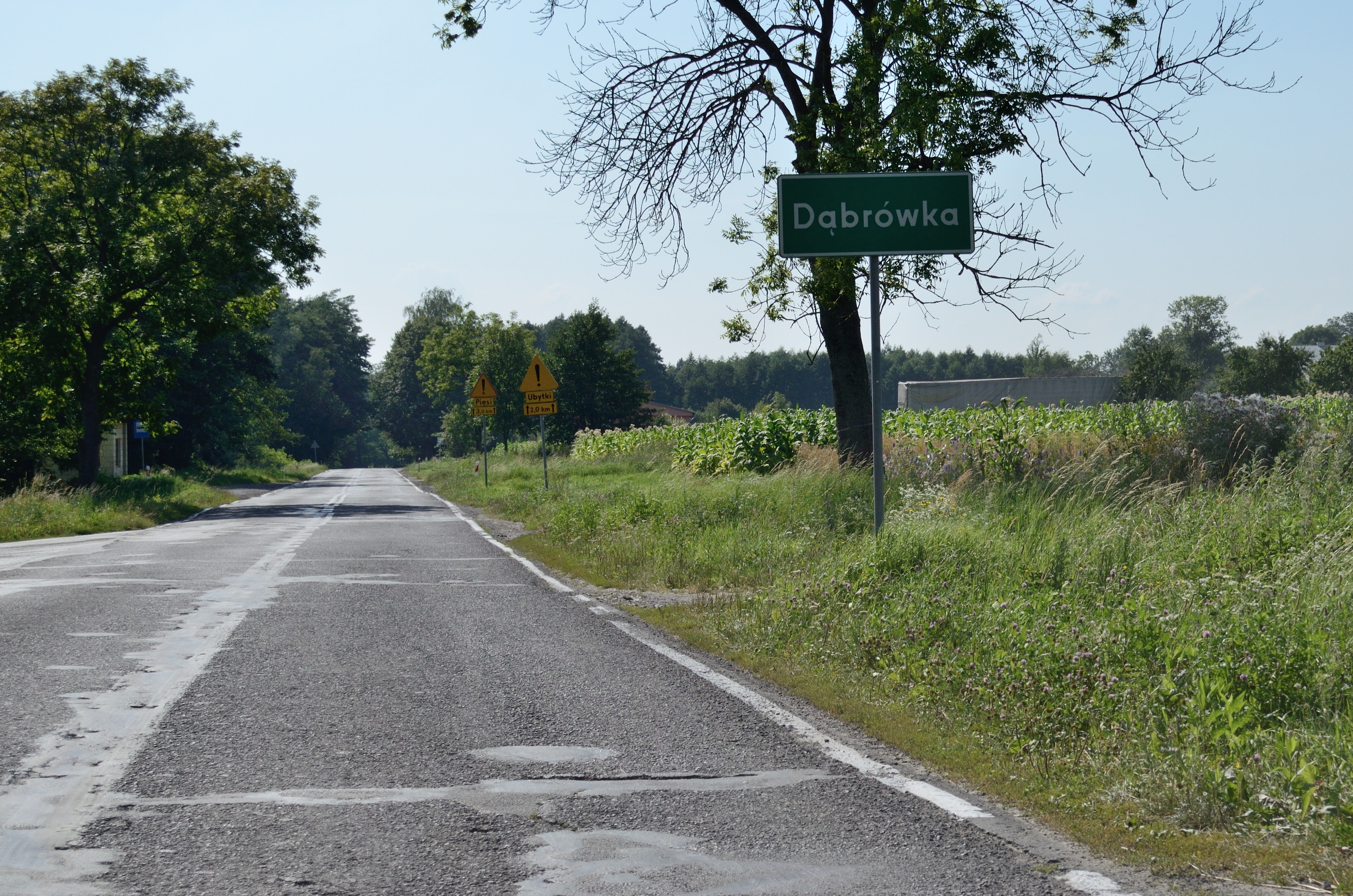
- Entrance to the village

- Location within Poland
- Coordinates: 50°21′38″N 22°35′19″E
- Country: Poland
- Voivodeship: Lublin
- County: Biłgoraj
- Gmina: Potok Górny

Population
  - Total: 510
- Time zone: UTC+1 (CET)
  - Summer (DST): UTC+2 (CEST)
- Vehicle registration: LBL

Dąbrówka [dɔmˈbrufka] is a village in the administrative district of Gmina Potok Górny, within Biłgoraj County, Lublin Voivodeship, in south-eastern Poland.

Following the German-Soviet invasion of Poland, which started World War II in September 1939, the village was occupied by Germany until 1944. Either on 17 or 19 December 1943, German troops and Ukrainian auxiliaries committed a massacre of nine local Poles, burned 34 houses and arrested further eight Poles, who were then sent to prison.
