= Niemirów, Biłgoraj County =

Niemirów
- Village
- Location within Poland
- Coordinates: 50°37′14″N 22°40′56″E
- Country: Poland
- Voivodeship: Lublin
- County: Biłgoraj
- Gmina: Frampol

Niemirów [ɲɛˈmiruf] is a village in the administrative district of Gmina Frampol, within Biłgoraj County, Lublin Voivodeship, in eastern Poland.

The locale's designation derives from the Slavic given name Niemir.
