= Rzeczyce, Lublin Voivodeship =

Rzeczyce
- Village
- Location within Poland
- Coordinates: 50°39′34″N 22°42′4″E
- Country: Poland
- Voivodeship: Lublin
- County: Biłgoraj
- Gmina: Frampol

Population
  - Total: 325

Rzeczyce [ʐɛˈt͡ʂɨt͡sɛ] is a village in the administrative district of Gmina Frampol, within Biłgoraj County, Lublin Voivodeship, in eastern Poland.
