= Furmanek =

Furmanek is a Polish surname. Furmánek (feminine: Furmánková) is a Czech and Slovak surname. Notable people with the surname include:

- Mieczysław Furmanek (1937–2026), Polish politician
- Ron Furmanek, American music producer and filmographer
