= Okrągłe, Lublin Voivodeship =

Okrągłe
- Village
- Location within Poland
- Coordinates: 50°30′36″N 22°43′10″E
- Country: Poland
- Voivodeship: Lublin
- County: Biłgoraj
- Gmina: Biłgoraj

Population
  - Total: 393

Okrągłe [ɔˈkrɔŋɡwɛ] is a village in the administrative district of Gmina Biłgoraj, within Biłgoraj County, Lublin Voivodeship, in eastern Poland.
