= Sól, Lublin Voivodeship =

Sól
- Village
- Location within Poland
- Coordinates: 50°30′30″N 22°38′49″E
- Country: Poland
- Voivodeship: Lublin
- County: Biłgoraj
- Gmina: Biłgoraj

Population
  - Total: 1,708

Sól [sul] is a village in the administrative district of Gmina Biłgoraj, within Biłgoraj County, Lublin Voivodeship, in eastern Poland.
