= Tokarski =

Tokarski (feminine Tokarska) is a Polish surname, it may refer to:

- Dustin Tokarski (born 1989), Canadian ice hockey player
- Genowefa Tokarska (born 1949), Polish politician
- Joanna Tokarska-Bakir (born 1958), Polish cultural anthropologist
- Maja Tokarska (born 1991), Polish volleyball player
- Piotr Tokarski, Polish actor
