= Bukownica, Lublin Voivodeship =

Bukownica
- Village
- Location within Poland
- Coordinates: 50°33′32″N 22°50′37″E
- Country: Poland
- Voivodeship: Lublin
- County: Biłgoraj
- Gmina: Tereszpol

Population
  - Total: 198

Bukownica [bukɔvˈnit͡sa] is a village in the administrative district of Gmina Tereszpol, within Biłgoraj County, Lublin Voivodeship, in eastern Poland.
