= Podlesie, Biłgoraj County =

Podlesie
- Village
- Location within Poland
- Coordinates: 50°30′34″N 22°41′51″E
- Country: Poland
- Voivodeship: Lublin
- County: Biłgoraj
- Gmina: Biłgoraj

Podlesie [pɔdˈlɛɕɛ] is a village in the administrative district of Gmina Biłgoraj, within Biłgoraj County, Lublin Voivodeship, in eastern Poland.
