= Chłopków, Lublin Voivodeship =

Chłopków
- Village
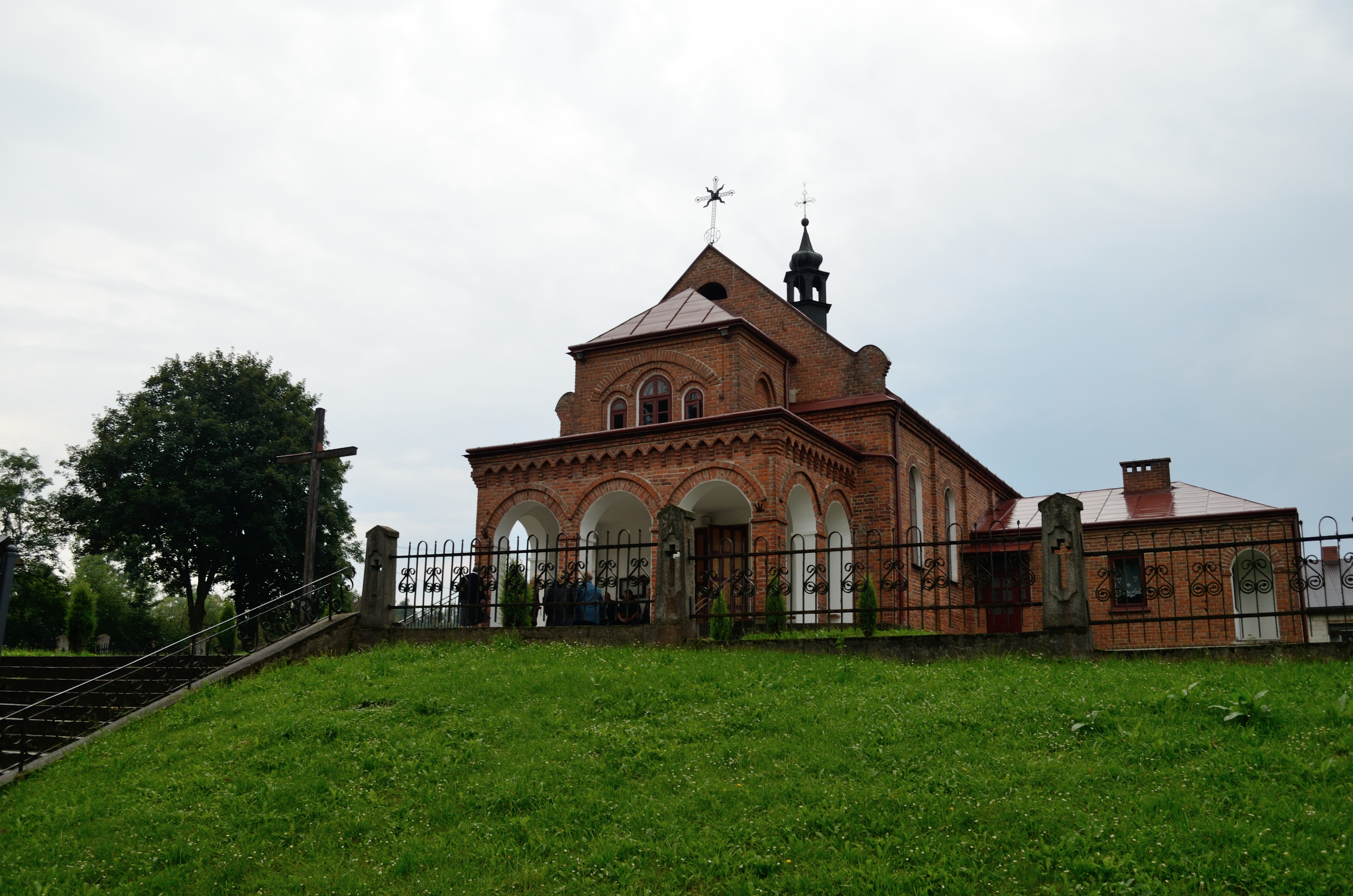
- Saint John of Dukla church in Chłopków

- Location within Poland
- Coordinates: 50°42′50″N 22°49′3″E
- Country: Poland
- Voivodeship: Lublin
- County: Biłgoraj
- Gmina: Frampol

Population
  - Total: 362
- Time zone: UTC+1 (CET)
  - Summer (DST): UTC+2 (CEST)

Chłopków [ˈxwɔpkuf] is a village in the administrative district of Gmina Frampol, within Biłgoraj County, Lublin Voivodeship, in eastern Poland.

== History ==
Six Polish citizens were murdered by Nazi Germany in the village during World War II.
