= Kolonia Sól =

- Village
- Location within Poland
- Coordinates: 50°31′14″N 22°40′26″E
- Country: Poland
- Voivodeship: Lublin
- County: Biłgoraj
- Gmina: Biłgoraj

Kolonia Sól [kɔˈlɔɲa ˈsul] is a village in the administrative district of Gmina Biłgoraj, within Biłgoraj County, Lublin Voivodeship, in eastern Poland.
