= Gmina Frampol =

Administrative district in Poland

Gmina Frampol Frampol Commune
- Gmina
- Coat of arms
- Interactive map of Gmina Frampol
- Coordinates (Frampol): 50°41′N 22°40′E
- Country: Poland
- Voivodeship: Lublin
- County: Biłgoraj
- Seat: Frampol

Area
  - Total: 107.61 km^{2} (41.55 sq mi)

Population (2006)
  - Total: 6,502
  - Density: 60.42/km^{2} (156.5/sq mi)
  - Urban: 1,415
  - Rural: 5,087

Gmina Frampol is an urban-rural gmina (administrative district) in Biłgoraj County, Lublin Voivodeship, in eastern Poland. Its seat is the town of Frampol, which lies approximately 16 kilometres (10 mi) north of Biłgoraj and 64 km (40 mi) south of the regional capital Lublin.

The gmina covers an area of 107.61 square kilometres (41.5 sq mi), and as of 2006 its total population is 6,502 (out of which the population of Frampol amounts to 1,415, and the population of the rural part of the gmina is 5,087).

== Villages ==
Apart from the town of Frampol, Gmina Frampol contains the villages and settlements of Cacanin, Chłopków, Karolówka, Kąty, Kolonia Kąty, Komodzianka, Korytków Mały, Niemirów, Pulczynów, Radzięcin, Rzeczyce, Smoryń, Sokołówka, Sokołówka-Kolonia, Stara Wieś, Teodorówka, Teodorówka-Kolonia, Wola Kątecka and Wola Radzięcka.

== Neighbouring gminas ==
Gmina Frampol is bordered by the gminas of Biłgoraj, Dzwola, Goraj and Radecznica.
