= Mieczysław Furmanek =

Polish politician (1937–2026)

Member of the Sejm
- In office 19 March 1972 – 21 March 1980

Personal details
- Born: 12 January 1937 Radzięcin, Poland
- Died: 16 January 2026 (aged 89) Biłgoraj, Poland
- Party: PZPR
- Occupation: Farmer

Mieczysław Furmanek (12 January 1937 – 16 January 2026) was a Polish politician. A member of the Polish United Workers' Party, he served in the Sejm from 1972 to 1980.

Furmanek died in Biłgoraj on 16 January 2026, at the age of 89.
