= Dereźnia-Zagrody =

- Village
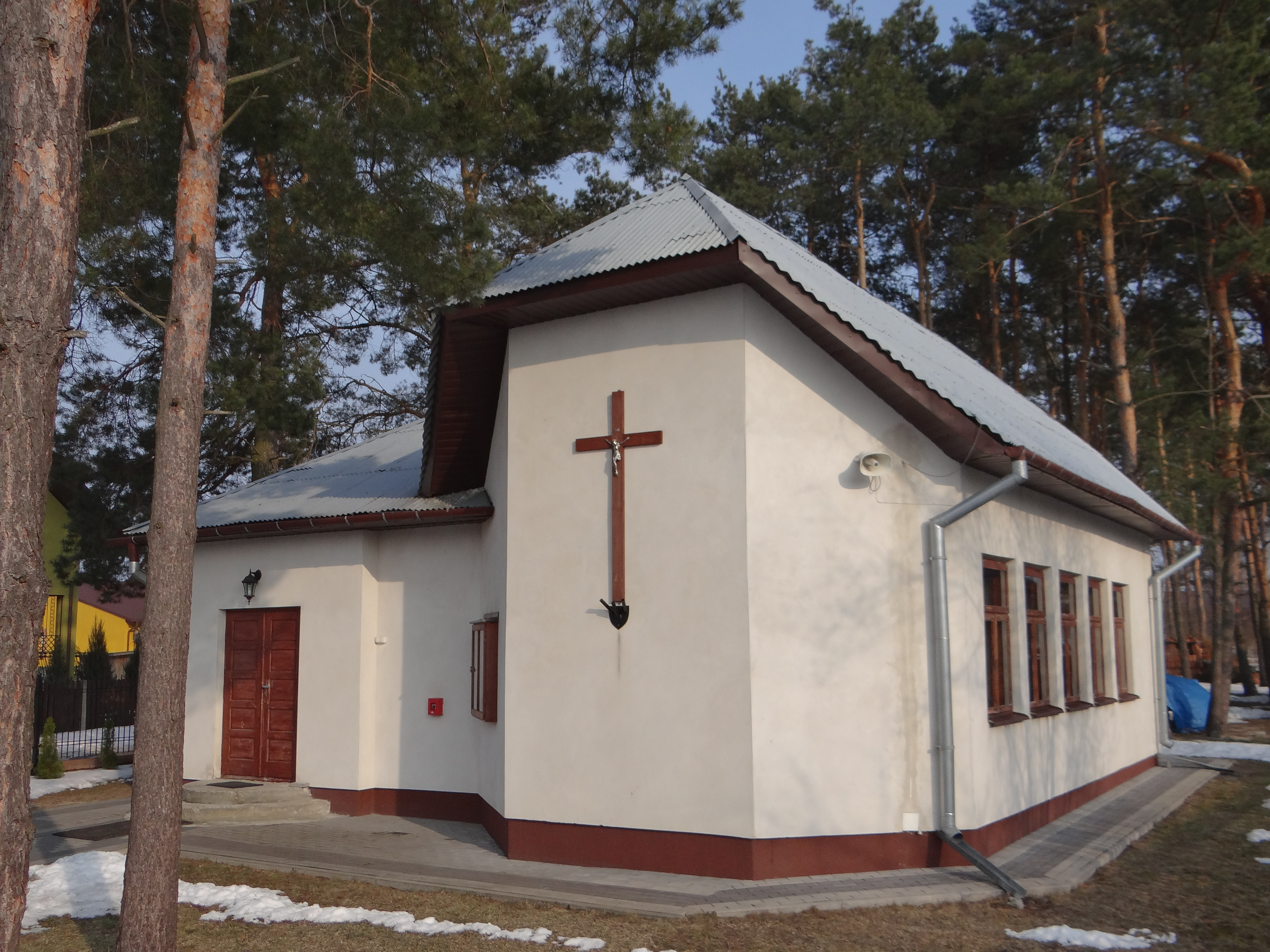
- A chapel in the town of Dereźnia-Zagrody

- Location within Poland
- Coordinates: 50°31′N 22°41′E
- Country: Poland
- Voivodeship: Lublin
- County: Biłgoraj
- Gmina: Biłgoraj

Population
  - Total: 480

Dereźnia-Zagrody [dɛˈrɛʑɲa zaˈɡrɔdɨ] is a village in the administrative district of Gmina Biłgoraj, within Biłgoraj County, Lublin Voivodeship, in eastern Poland.
