= Dąbrowica, Biłgoraj County =

Dąbrowica
- Village
- Location within Poland
- Coordinates: 50°32′33″N 22°39′30″E
- Country: Poland
- Voivodeship: Lublin
- County: Biłgoraj
- Gmina: Biłgoraj

Population
  - Total: 877

Dąbrowica [dɔmbrɔˈvit͡sa] is a village in the administrative district of Gmina Biłgoraj, within Biłgoraj County, Lublin Voivodeship, in eastern Poland.
