= Dereźnia Majdańska =

- Village
- Location within Poland
- Coordinates: 50°29′35″N 22°42′24″E
- Country: Poland
- Voivodeship: Lublin
- County: Biłgoraj
- Gmina: Biłgoraj

Population
  - Total: 273

Dereźnia Majdańska [dɛˈrɛʑɲa mai̯ˈdaɲska] is a village in the administrative district of Gmina Biłgoraj, within Biłgoraj County, Lublin Voivodeship, in eastern Poland.
