= Teodorówka, Gmina Frampol =

Teodorówka
- Village
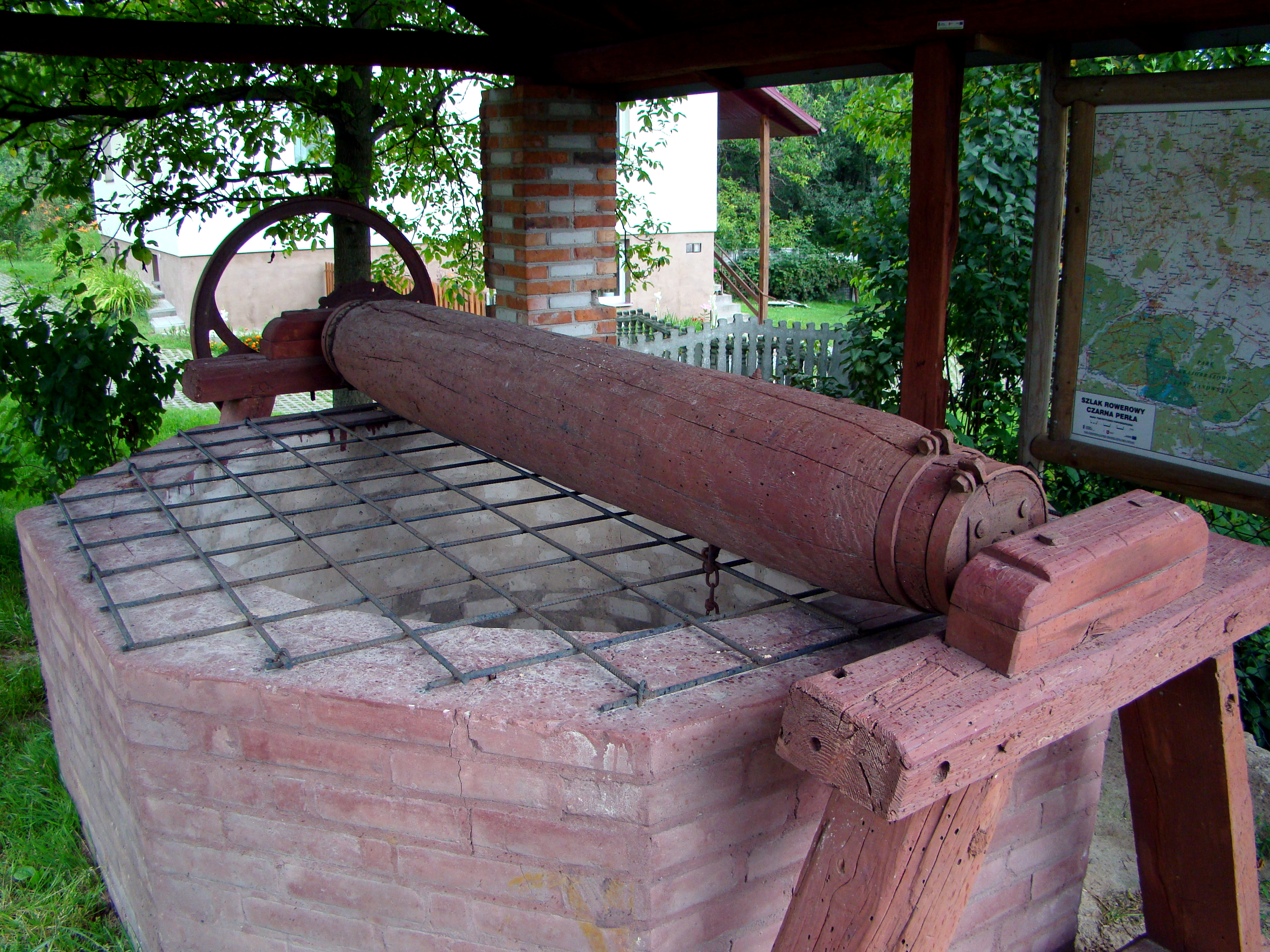
- Historic well in Teodorówka

- Location within Poland
- Coordinates: 50°41′27″N 22°45′0″E
- Country: Poland
- Voivodeship: Lublin
- County: Biłgoraj
- Gmina: Frampol

Population
  - Total: 589

Teodorówka [tɛɔdɔˈrufka] is a village in the administrative district of Gmina Frampol, within Biłgoraj County, Lublin Voivodeship, in eastern Poland.

The deepest well (150 m) in Gmina Frampol is located in Teodorówka.
