= Teodorówka, Gmina Biłgoraj =

Teodorówka
- Village
- Location within Poland
- Coordinates: 50°32′29″N 22°46′58″E
- Country: Poland
- Voivodeship: Lublin
- County: Biłgoraj
- Gmina: Biłgoraj

Population
  - Total: 153

Teodorówka [tɛɔdɔˈrufka] is a village in the administrative district of Gmina Biłgoraj, within Biłgoraj County, Lublin Voivodeship, in eastern Poland.
