= Gmina Potok Górny =

Gmina Potok Górny Potok Górny Commune
- Gmina
- Interactive map of Gmina Potok Górny
- Coordinates (Potok Górny): 50°23′N 22°34′E
- Country: Poland
- Voivodeship: Lublin
- County: Biłgoraj
- Seat: Potok Górny

Area
  - Total: 111.16 km^{2} (42.92 sq mi)

Population (2006)
  - Total: 5,591
  - Density: 50.30/km^{2} (130.3/sq mi)

Gmina Potok Górny is a rural gmina (administrative district) in Biłgoraj County, Lublin Voivodeship, in eastern Poland. Its seat is the village of Potok Górny, which lies approximately 22 kilometres (14 mi) south-west of Biłgoraj and 96 km (60 mi) south of the regional capital Lublin.

The gmina covers an area of 111.16 square kilometres (42.9 sq mi), and in 2006 its total population was 5,591.

Potok Górny is the poorest gmina in Poland.

== Villages ==
Gmina Potok Górny contains the villages and settlements of Dąbrówka, Jasiennik Stary, Jedlinki, Kolonia Malennik, Lipiny Dolne, Lipiny Dolne-Kolonia, Lipiny Górne-Borowina, Lipiny Górne-Lewki, Naklik, Potok Górny, Szyszków and Zagródki.

== Neighbouring gminas ==
Gmina Potok Górny is bordered by the gminas of Biszcza, Harasiuki, Krzeszów and Kuryłówka.
