= Gmina Aleksandrów, Lublin Voivodeship =

Gmina Aleksandrów Aleksandrów Commune
- Gmina
- Flag Coat of arms

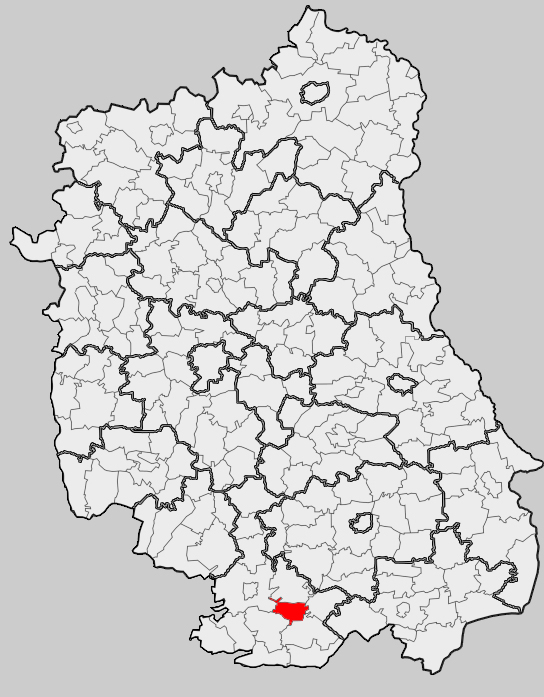
- Location within the county and voivodeship
- Coordinates (Aleksandrów): 50°27′52″N 22°54′22″E
- Country: Poland
- Voivodeship: Lublin
- County: Biłgoraj
- Seat: Aleksandrów

Area
  - Total: 54.26 km^{2} (20.95 sq mi)

Population (2006)
  - Total: 3,184
  - Density: 58.68/km^{2} (152.0/sq mi)
- Website: http://www.ealeksandrow.pl/

Gmina Aleksandrów is a rural gmina (administrative district) in Biłgoraj County, Lublin Voivodeship, in eastern Poland. Its seat is the village of Aleksandrów, which lies approximately 16 kilometres (10 mi) south-east of Biłgoraj and 91 km (57 mi) south of the regional capital Lublin.

The gmina covers an area of 54.26 square kilometres (20.9 sq mi), and as of 2006 its total population is 3,184.

The gmina contains part of the protected area called Puszcza Solska Landscape Park.

== Villages ==
Gmina Aleksandrów contains the villages and settlements of Aleksandrów, Margole, Podlas and Sigła.

== Neighbouring gminas ==
Gmina Aleksandrów is bordered by the gminas of Biłgoraj, Józefów, Księżpol, Łukowa and Tereszpol.

== Massacres during Second World War ==
The area was the site of five massacres of Poles by German soldiers during the Second World War, in the village of Aleksandrów: August 1942, February, June and August 1943 and July 1944. On 6 July 1944 the largest massacre occurred. Between 444 and 446 people were murdered and 100 buildings burned down by the Germans, while 2500 people were sent to concentration camps.
