= Gmina Tereszpol =

Gmina Tereszpol Tereszpol Commune
- Gmina
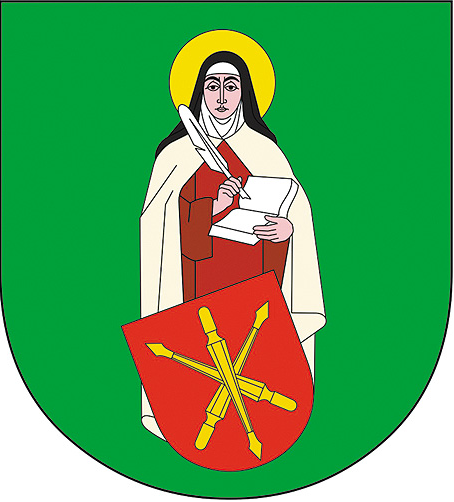
- Coat of arms
- Interactive map of Gmina Tereszpol
- Coordinates (Tereszpol): 50°34′43″N 22°52′48″E
- Country: Poland
- Voivodeship: Lublin
- County: Biłgoraj
- Seat: Tereszpol

Area
  - Total: 144.01 km^{2} (55.60 sq mi)

Population (2006)
  - Total: 4,030
  - Density: 28.0/km^{2} (72.5/sq mi)
- Website: http://www.tereszpol.pl/

Gmina Tereszpol is a rural gmina (administrative district) in Biłgoraj County, Lublin Voivodeship, in eastern Poland. Its seat is the village of Tereszpol, which lies approximately 11 kilometres (7 mi) east of Biłgoraj and 78 km (48 mi) south of the regional capital Lublin.

The gmina covers an area of 144.01 square kilometres (55.6 sq mi), and as of 2006 its total population is 4,030.

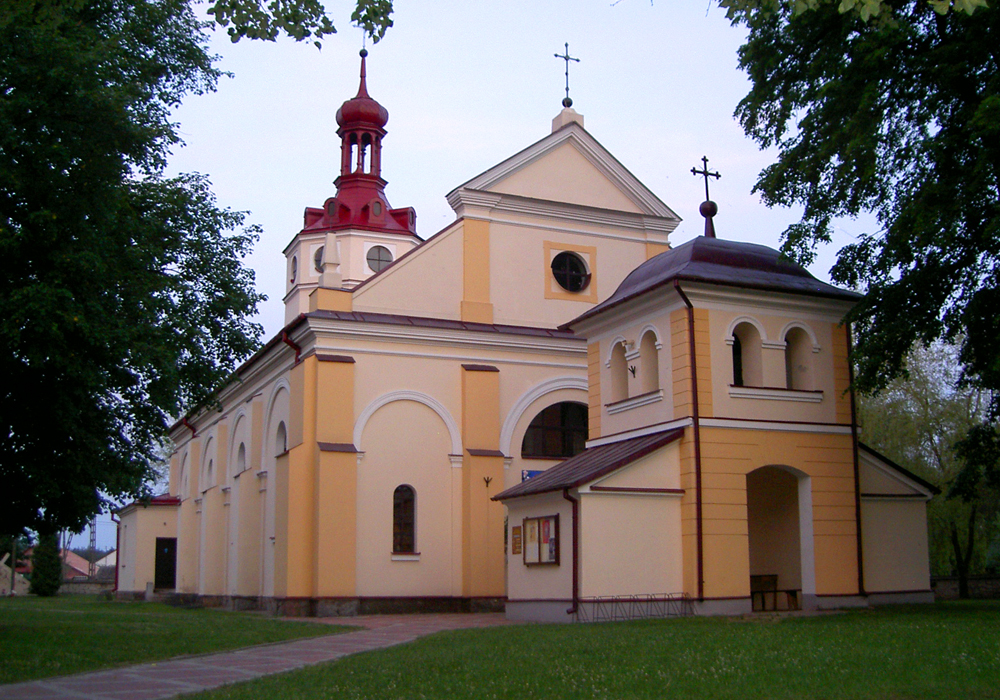
Our Lady of Częstochowa church

== Villages ==
Gmina Tereszpol contains the villages and settlements of Bukownica, Lipowiec, Panasówka, Poręby, Szozdy, Tereszpol, Tereszpol-Kukiełki and Tereszpol-Zygmunty.

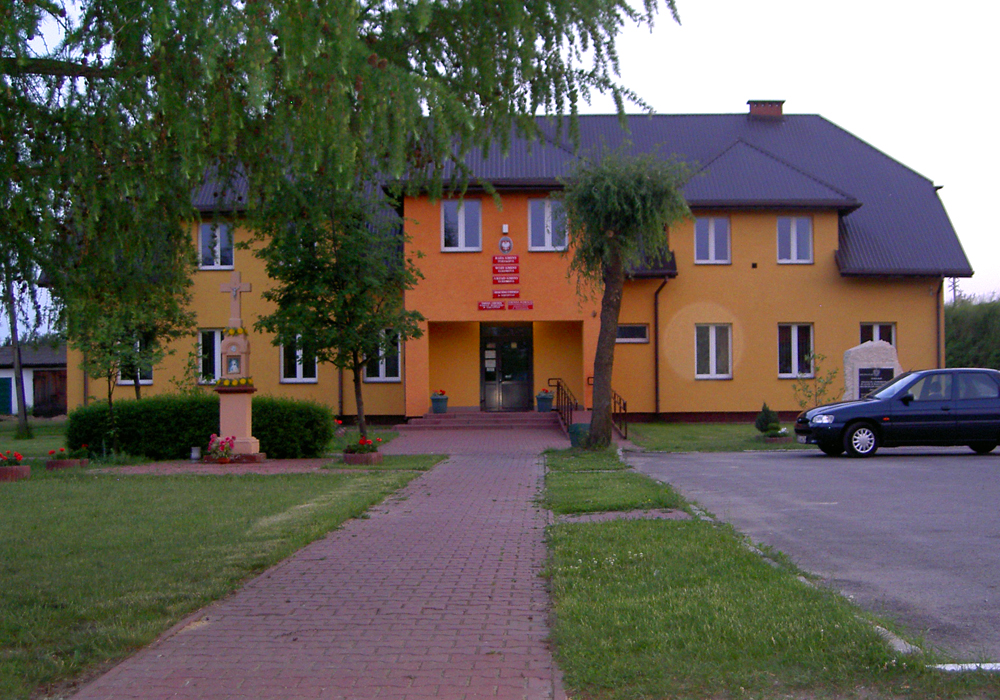
Commune Council

== Neighbouring gminas ==
Gmina Tereszpol is bordered by the gminas of Aleksandrów, Biłgoraj, Józefów, Radecznica and Zwierzyniec.
