= Potok Górny =

- Village
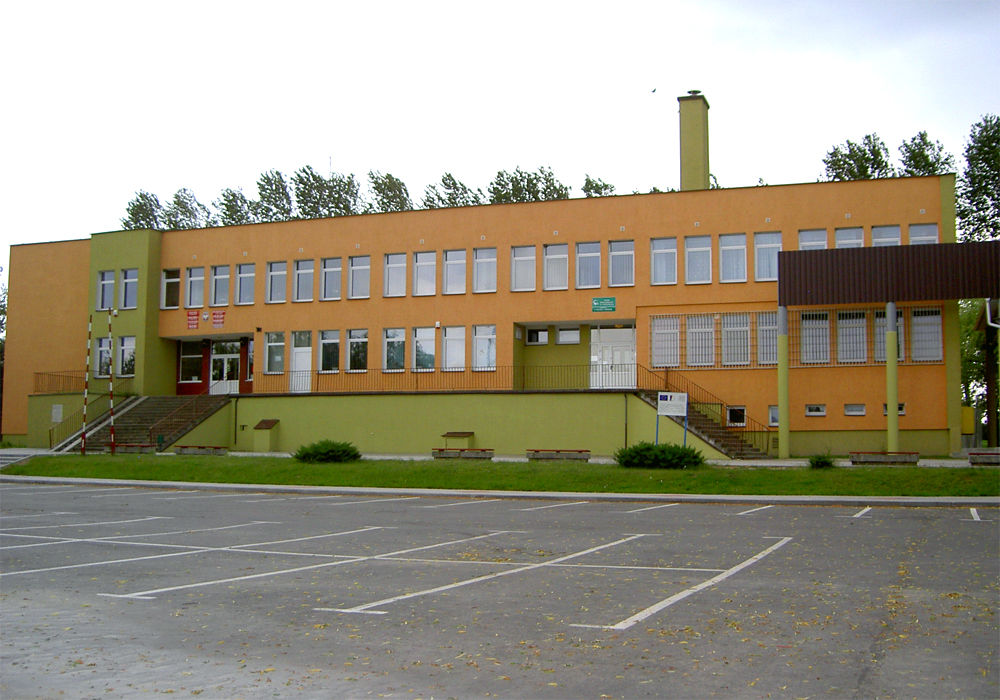
- Gmina administration building

- Location within Poland
- Coordinates: 50°23′N 22°34′E
- Country: Poland
- Voivodeship: Lublin
- County: Biłgoraj
- Gmina: Potok Górny

Population
  - Total: 1,341

Potok Górny [ˈpɔtɔk ˈɡurnɨ] is a village in Biłgoraj County, Lublin Voivodeship, in eastern Poland. It is the seat of the gmina (administrative district) called Gmina Potok Górny.
