= Borowiec, Lublin Voivodeship =

Borowiec
- Village
- Location within Poland
- Coordinates: 50°21′25″N 23°2′35″E
- Country: Poland
- Voivodeship: Lublin
- County: Biłgoraj
- Gmina: Łukowa

Population
  - Total: 56

Borowiec [bɔˈrɔvjɛt͡s] is a village in the administrative district of Gmina Łukowa, within Biłgoraj County, Lublin Voivodeship, in eastern Poland.
