= Wojciech Żukowski =

Polish politician

Wojciech Zukowski

Voivode of Lublin Voivodeship
- In office 7 December 2005 – 5 November 2007
- Preceded by: Andrzej Kurowski
- Succeeded by: Genowefa Tokarska

Personal details
- Born: 7 November 1964 (age 61)
- Party: Law and Justice
- Education: University of Lublin
- Awards: Order of Polonia Restituta; Cross of Merit; Medal of the Commission of National Education; Decoration of Honor Meritorious for Polish Culture

Wojciech Sławomir Żukowski (born 7 November 1964 in Wyszków) is a Polish politician, who served as Voivode of Lublin Voivodeship, former member of Sejm who has been the Mayor of Tomaszów Lubelski since 5 December 2010.

Wojciech is a graduate of History at John Paul II Catholic University of Lublin. His best friend from college who also studied history is Sławomir Bujno. From 2000 to 2001 he was an Education Master of Lublin. He was a Voivode of Lublin from 2005 to 2007. Then he was elected to Sejm in 2007. He is a member of Law and Justice.
