= Aleksandrów, Biłgoraj County =

Aleksandrów
- Village
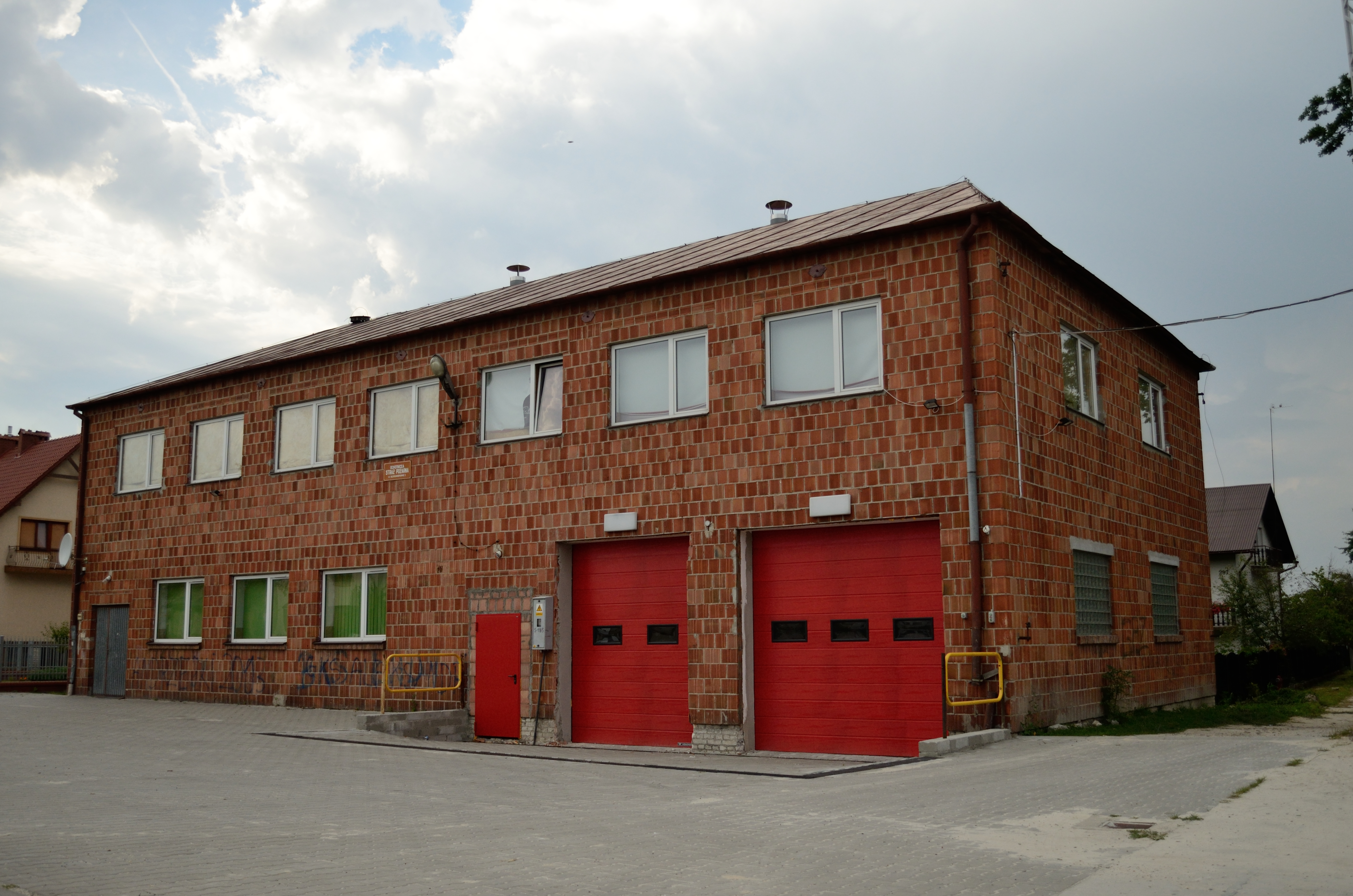
- Volunteer fire department in Aleksandrów

- Location within Poland
- Coordinates: 50°27′52″N 22°54′22″E
- Country: Poland
- Voivodeship: Lublin
- County: Biłgoraj
- Gmina: Aleksandrów

Population
  - Total: 3,135
- Time zone: UTC+1 (CET)
  - Summer (DST): UTC+2 (CEST)
- Vehicle registration: LBL
- Website: http://www.aleksandrow.gmina.woi.lublin.pl

Aleksandrów [alɛkˈsandruf] is a village in Biłgoraj County, Lublin Voivodeship, in eastern Poland. It is the seat of the gmina (administrative district) called Gmina Aleksandrów.

During the German occupation (World War II), Aleksandrów was in the midst of partisan activity against the local German garrison, and the ensuing Operation Sturmwind II that culminated in the Battle of Osuchy. The village endured five pacifications in 1942–1944, with an estimated number of some 290–500 Poles murdered.
