= Tereszpol =

- Village
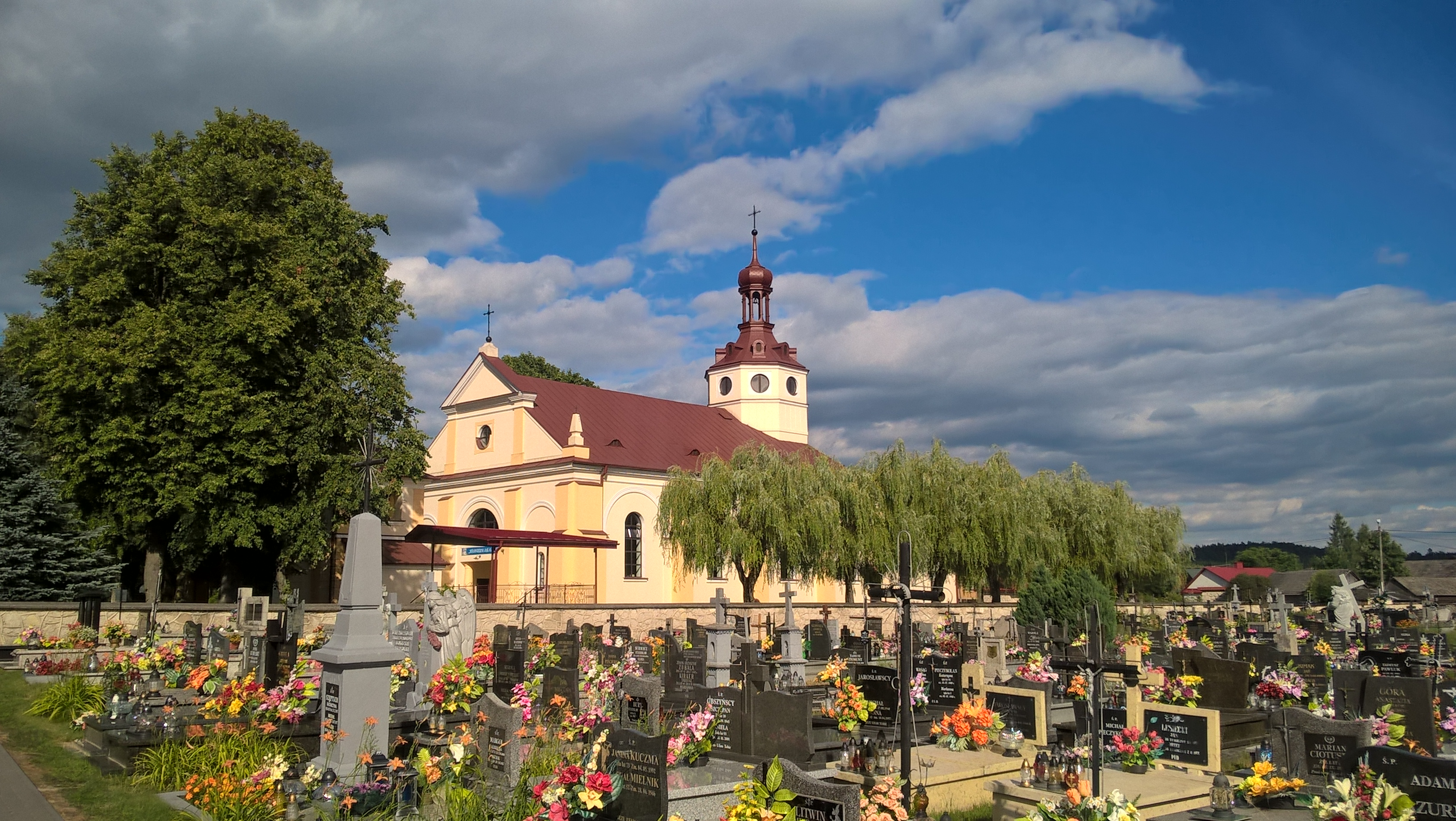
- Church in Tereszpol

- Location within Poland
- Coordinates: 50°34′43″N 22°52′48″E
- Country: Poland
- Voivodeship: Lublin
- County: Biłgoraj
- Gmina: Tereszpol

Population
  - Total: 1,157

Tereszpol [tɛˈrɛʂpɔl] is a village in Biłgoraj County, Lublin Voivodeship, in eastern Poland. It is the seat of the gmina (administrative district) called Gmina Tereszpol.
