= Andrzejówka, Biłgoraj County =

Andrzejówka
- Village
- Location within Poland
- Coordinates: 50°35′36″N 22°36′19″E
- Country: Poland
- Voivodeship: Lublin
- County: Biłgoraj
- Gmina: Biłgoraj

Population
  - Total: 213

Andrzejówka [andʐɛˈjufka] is a village in the administrative district of Gmina Biłgoraj, within Biłgoraj County, Lublin Voivodeship, in eastern Poland.
