= Łukowa, Lublin Voivodeship =

Łukowa
- Village
- Location within Poland
- Coordinates: 50°22′46″N 22°54′51″E
- Country: Poland
- Voivodeship: Lublin
- County: Biłgoraj
- Gmina: Łukowa

Population
  - Total: 2,603
- Website: http://www.lukowa.pl

Łukowa [wuˈkɔva] is a village in Biłgoraj County, Lublin Voivodeship, in eastern Poland. It is the seat of the gmina (administrative district) called Gmina Łukowa.
