= Karolówka, Lublin Voivodeship =

Karolówka
- Village
- Location within Poland
- Coordinates: 50°37′54″N 22°42′20″E
- Country: Poland
- Voivodeship: Lublin
- County: Biłgoraj
- Gmina: Frampol

Population
  - Total: 254

Karolówka [karɔˈlufka] is a village in the administrative district of Gmina Frampol, within Biłgoraj County, Lublin Voivodeship, in eastern Poland.
