= Smólsko Duże =

- Village
- Location within Poland
- Coordinates: 50°28′49″N 22°46′6″E
- Country: Poland
- Voivodeship: Lublin
- County: Biłgoraj
- Gmina: Biłgoraj

Population
  - Total: 478

Smólsko Duże (Polish pronunciation: [ˈsmulskɔ ˈduʐɛ]) is a village in the administrative district of Gmina Biłgoraj, within Biłgoraj County, Lublin Voivodeship, in eastern Poland.
