= Edwardów, Biłgoraj County =

Edwardów
- Village
- Location within Poland
- Coordinates: 50°30′55″N 22°47′0″E
- Country: Poland
- Voivodeship: Lublin
- County: Biłgoraj
- Gmina: Biłgoraj

Population
  - Total: 42

Edwardów [ɛdˈvarduf] is a village in the administrative district of Gmina Biłgoraj, within Biłgoraj County, Lublin Voivodeship, in eastern Poland.
