= Gmina Łukowa =

Gmina Łukowa Łukowa Commune
- Gmina
- Interactive map of Gmina Łukowa
- Coordinates (Łukowa): 50°22′46″N 22°54′51″E
- Country: Poland
- Voivodeship: Lublin
- County: Biłgoraj
- Seat: Łukowa

Area
  - Total: 148.72 km^{2} (57.42 sq mi)

Population (2006)
  - Total: 4,531
  - Density: 30.47/km^{2} (78.91/sq mi)
- Website: http://www.lukowa.pl

Gmina Łukowa is a rural gmina (administrative district) in Biłgoraj County, Lublin Voivodeship, in eastern Poland. Its seat is the village of Łukowa, which lies approximately 23 kilometres (14 mi) south-east of Biłgoraj and 100 km (62 mi) south of the regional capital Lublin.

The gmina covers an area of 148.72 square kilometres (57.4 sq mi), and as of 2006 its total population is 4,531.

The gmina contains part of the protected area called Puszcza Solska Landscape Park.

== Villages ==
Gmina Łukowa contains the villages and settlements of Borowiec, Chmielek, Kozaki Osuchowskie, Łukowa, Osuchy, Pisklaki, Podsośnina Łukowska, Szarajówka and Szostaki.

== Neighbouring gminas ==
Gmina Łukowa is bordered by the gminas of Aleksandrów, Józefów, Księżpol, Obsza, Susiec and Tarnogród.
