= Biszcza =

- Village
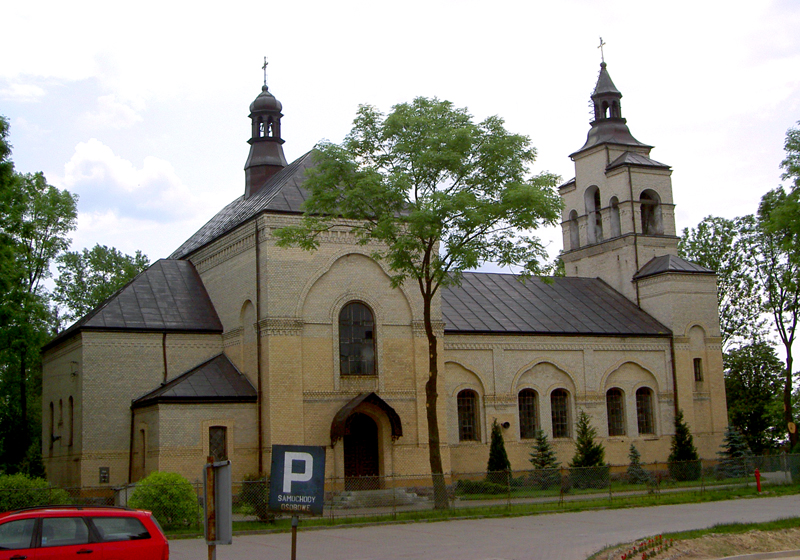
- Church of the Sacred Heart

- Location within Poland
- Coordinates: 50°24′38″N 22°38′32″E
- Country: Poland
- Voivodeship: Lublin
- County: Biłgoraj
- Gmina: Biszcza

Population
  - Total: 1,901

Biszcza [ˈbiʂt͡ʂa], until 1999 Biszcza Pierwsza, is a village in Biłgoraj County, Lublin Voivodeship, in eastern Poland. It is the seat of the gmina (administrative district) called Gmina Biszcza.
