= Stary Bidaczów =

- Village
- Location within Poland
- Coordinates: 50°29′1″N 22°35′14″E
- Country: Poland
- Voivodeship: Lublin
- County: Biłgoraj
- Gmina: Biłgoraj

Population
  - Total: 324

Stary Bidaczów [ˈstarɨ biˈdat͡ʂuf] is a village in the administrative district of Gmina Biłgoraj, within Biłgoraj County, Lublin Voivodeship, in Eastern Poland.
