= Wola Mała, Lublin Voivodeship =

Wola Mała
- Village
- Location within Poland
- Coordinates: 50°32′51″N 22°45′54″E
- Country: Poland
- Voivodeship: Podkarpackie
- County: Łańcut
- Gmina: Gmina Czarna

Population
  - Total: 162

Wola Mała [ˈvɔla ˈmawa] is a village in the administrative district of Gmina Łańcut, within Łańcut County, Podkarpacie Voivodeship, in eastern Poland.

The village has a population of 162.
