= Gmina Biszcza =

Gmina Biszcza Biszcza Commune
- Gmina
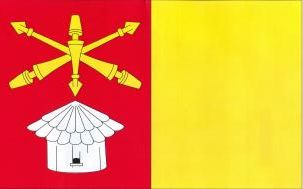
- Flag
- Interactive map of Gmina Biszcza
- Coordinates (Biszcza): 50°24′38″N 22°38′32″E
- Country: Poland
- Voivodeship: Lublin
- County: Biłgoraj
- Seat: Biszcza

Area
  - Total: 106.31 km^{2} (41.05 sq mi)

Population (2006)
  - Total: 3,934
  - Density: 37.00/km^{2} (95.84/sq mi)

Gmina Biszcza is a rural gmina (administrative district) in Biłgoraj County, Lublin Voivodeship, in eastern Poland. Its seat is the village of Biszcza, which lies approximately 17 kilometres (11 mi) south-west of Biłgoraj and 94 km (58 mi) south of the regional capital Lublin.

The gmina covers an area of 106.31 square kilometres (41.0 sq mi), and as of 2006 its total population is 3,934.

== Villages ==
Gmina Biszcza contains the villages and settlements of Biszcza, Budziarze, Bukowina, Gózd Lipiński, Suszka, Wola Kulońska, Wólka Biska and Żary.

== Neighbouring gminas ==
Gmina Biszcza is bordered by the gminas of Biłgoraj, Harasiuki, Księżpol, Kuryłówka, Potok Górny and Tarnogród.
