= Biłgoraj County =

Biłgoraj County Powiat biłgorajski
- County
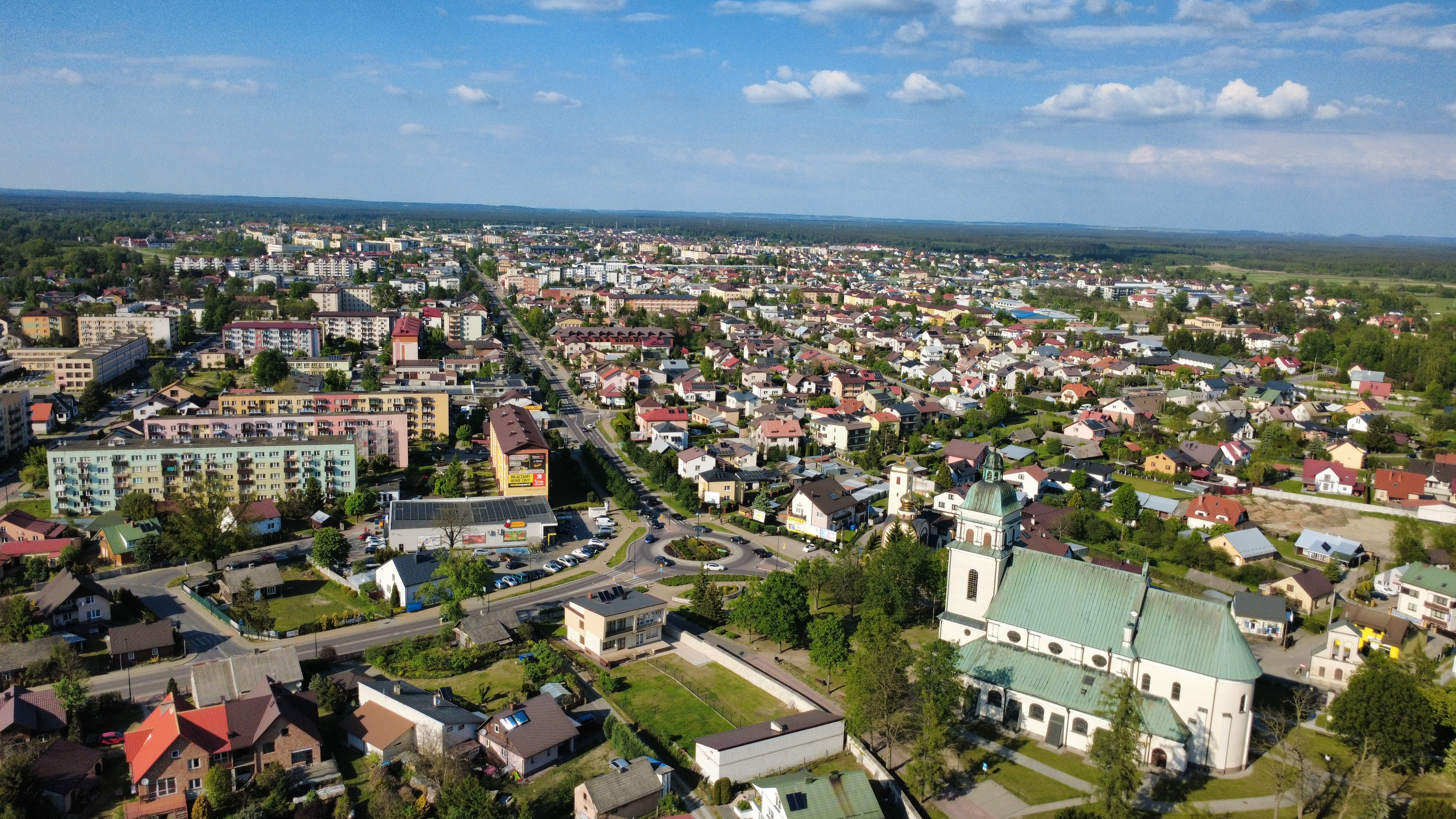
- A panoramic view of Biłgoraj

- Flag Coat of arms

- Location within the voivodeship
- Coordinates (Biłgoraj): 50°33′N 22°44′E
- Country: Poland
- Voivodeship: Lublin
- Establishment as part of Tarnogród County: 1810
- Establishment of Biłgoraj County: 1866
- Most Recent Reestablishment of Biłgoraj County: January 1, 1999
- Seat: Biłgoraj
- Gminas: Total 14 (incl. 1 urban): Biłgoraj; Gmina Aleksandrów; Gmina Biłgoraj; Gmina Biszcza; Gmina Frampol; Gmina Goraj; Gmina Józefów; Gmina Księżpol; Gmina Łukowa; Gmina Obsza; Gmina Potok Górny; Gmina Tarnogród; Gmina Tereszpol; Gmina Turobin

Government
  - Body: executive board
  - Starosta: Andrzej Szarlip (PiS)

Area
  - Total: 1,677.79 km^{2} (647.80 sq mi)
  - Rank: 5th

Population (2025)
  - Total: 94,173
  - Rank: 7th
  - Density: 56.129/km^{2} (145.37/sq mi)
  - Urban: 32,563
  - Rural: 61,610
- Time zone: UTC+1 (CET)
  - Summer (DST): UTC+2 (CEST)
- Postal code: 23-400 to 23-465
- Car plates: LBL
- Website: http://www.bilgorajski.pl/

Biłgoraj County (Polish: powiat biłgorajski) is a unit of territorial administration and local government (powiat) in Lublin Voivodeship, eastern Poland. It was established on January 1, 1999, as a result of the Polish local government reforms passed in 1998. Its administrative seat and largest town is Biłgoraj, which lies 79 kilometres (49 mi) south of the regional capital Lublin.

== History ==
Contemporary Biłgoraj County's territories before the Partitions of Poland were located at the border of two Voivodeships. Most of the county was part of the Ruthenian Voivodeship (historical region of Red Ruthenia), within the lands of Chełm and Przemyśl. A smaller portion of the county, including the areas of today's towns: Biłgoraj, Goraj, and Frampol, was part of the Lublin Voivodeship.

In 1807, the Duchy of Warsaw was established. The new administrative division was based on departments, subdivided into counties. The territory of today's Biłgoraj County became part of Tarnogród County in 1810, which was incorporated within the Lublin Department.

=== Congress Poland ===
In 1866, following the failure of the January Uprising, the administrative division of Congress Poland was reformed. Tarnogród County was abolished, and in its place, Biłgoraj County was established.

=== Second Polish Republic ===
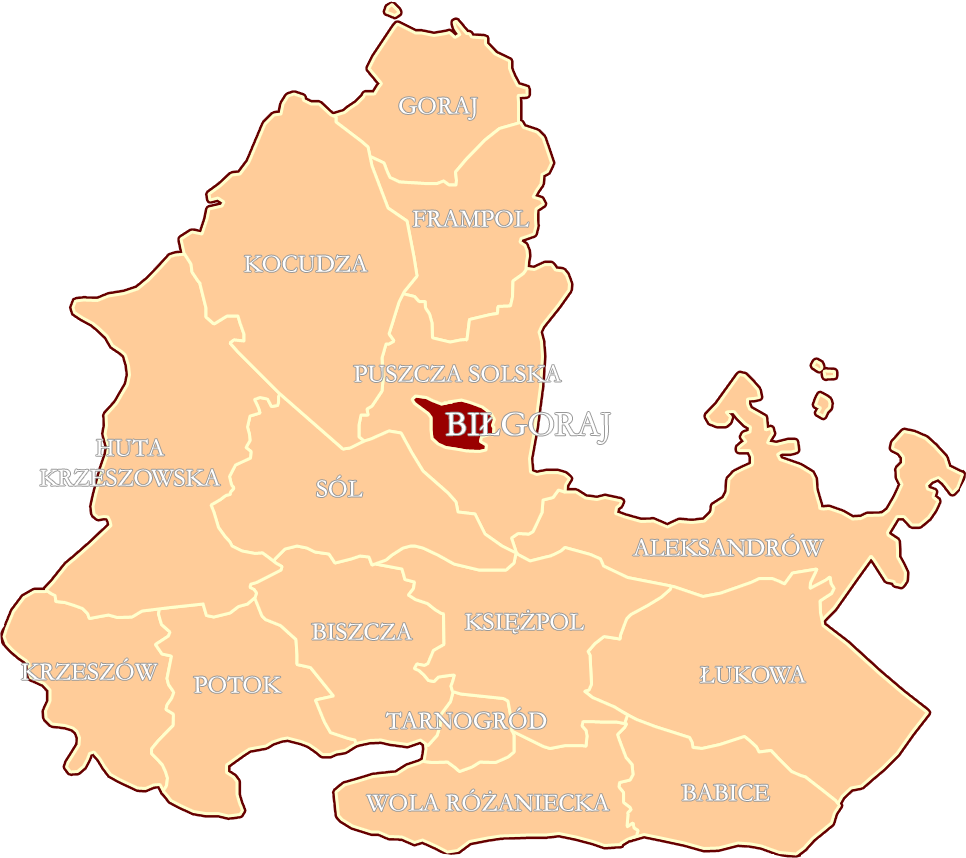
Biłgoraj County map, 1933–1954

When Poland regained independence in 1918, Biłgoraj County became one of the 19 counties of the Lublin Voivodeship, which was established on August 14, 1919.

=== General Governorate for the Occupied Polish Region ===
According to the Molotov-Ribbentrop Pact, the Biłgoraj region, along with the rest of the Polish territories east of the Vistula and San rivers, was to be ceded to the Soviet Union. However, changes were made to the occupiers' arrangements. On October 26, 1939, Biłgoraj County was placed under German civilian administration as Landkreis Biłgoraj.

=== Polish People's Republic ===
In 1944, the administrative division of Poland was restored to its pre-war shape.

According to the 1952 administrative division, Biłgoraj County was part of the Lublin Voivodeship.

As a result of the administrative reform of 1975, on June 1 of that year, Biłgoraj County was abolished. Its gminas were incorporated into the newly established Zamość Voivodeship.

=== Third Polish Republic ===
The administrative reform of 1999 restored Biłgoraj County within the borders of the new Lublin Voivodeship.

== Geography ==
Biłgoraj County alongside Tomaszów County is the southernmost county in the Lublin Voivodeship. It borders Lublin County and Krasnystaw County to the north, Zamość County and Tomaszów County to the east, Lubaczów County and Przeworsk County to the south, Leżajsk County to the south-west, Nisko County to the west, and Janów County to the north-west.

=== Protected areas ===
Protected areas of the county include the following categories:

Special Protection Area: Solska Forest (Puszcza Solska).

Landscape parks: Krasnobród Landscape Park, Solska Forest Landscape Park (Park Krajobrazowy Puszczy Solskiej), Szczebrzeszyn Landscape Park.

National Parks: Roztocze National Park.

Nature reserve: Czartowe Pole Nature Reserve, Obary Nature Reserve, Szum Nature Reserve.

Special Area of Conservation: Dolina Dolnej Tanwi (Valley of the Lower Tanew), Uroczyska Puszczy Solskiej.

=== Rivers ===
Following is a list of rivers, which are at least partially, if not predominantly located within county.

Rank	Name	Total length (km)	Outflow
1	Tanew	114.3	San
2	Łada (Biała Łada)	62.8	Tanew
3	Bukowa	54.5	San
4	Pór	46.7	Wieprz
5	Wirowa	36.0	Tanew
6	Złota	33.1	San
7	Czarna Łada	26.3	Łada (Biała Łada)
8	Sopot	24.3	Tanew
9	Gorajka	23.0	Pór
10	Szum	22.3	Tanew
11	Kurzynka	20.2	Tanew
12	Złota Nitka	19.2	Tanew
13	Lubienia	19.2	Tanew
14	Borowina	18.9	Tanew
15	Rakowa	18.5	Bukowa
16	Nitka	16.4	Wirowa
17	Luchówka	15.2	Złota
18	Studzienica	14.9	Tanew
19	Niepryszka	11.5	Szum
20	Łazowna	11.3	Tanew
21	Gruszec	10.4	Bukowa
22	Szpisznica	10.2	Tanew
23	Ratwica	10.0	Czarna Łada
24	Osa	9.4	Łada (Biała Łada)
25	Mucha	8.7	Tanew
26	Bicz	7.7	Kurzynka
27	Smolnik	7.4	Czarna Łada
28	Stok	7.3	Braszczka
29	Braszczka	6.8	Czarna Łada
30	Pasternik	6.4	Lubienia
31	Studczek	6.2	Czarna Łada
32	Kiełbasówka	5.6	Ratwica
33	Czarna	5.6	Sopot
34	Nitka	5.4	Złota Nitka
35	Potok	4.7	Luchówka
36	Szarka	3.2	Czarna Łada
37	Świrek	2.8	Szum

=== Highest points ===
Wielka Jeżówka – 337,5 meters above sea level, Tłomska Góra – 325 meters above sea level, Sawina – 325 meters above sea level, Łysiec – 325 meters above sea level, Góra Kopczyna – 311,5 meters above sea level.

=== Towns and villages ===
Largest towns in Biłgoraj County as of 2025
Rank	Name	Population
1	Biłgoraj	24,312
2	Tarnogród	3,041
3	Józefów	2,254
4	Frampol	1,296
5	Goraj	868
6	Turobin	792

== Administrative divisions ==
The county is subdivided into 14 gminas (1 urban, 5 urban-rural and 8 rural). These are listed in the following table, in alphabetical order.

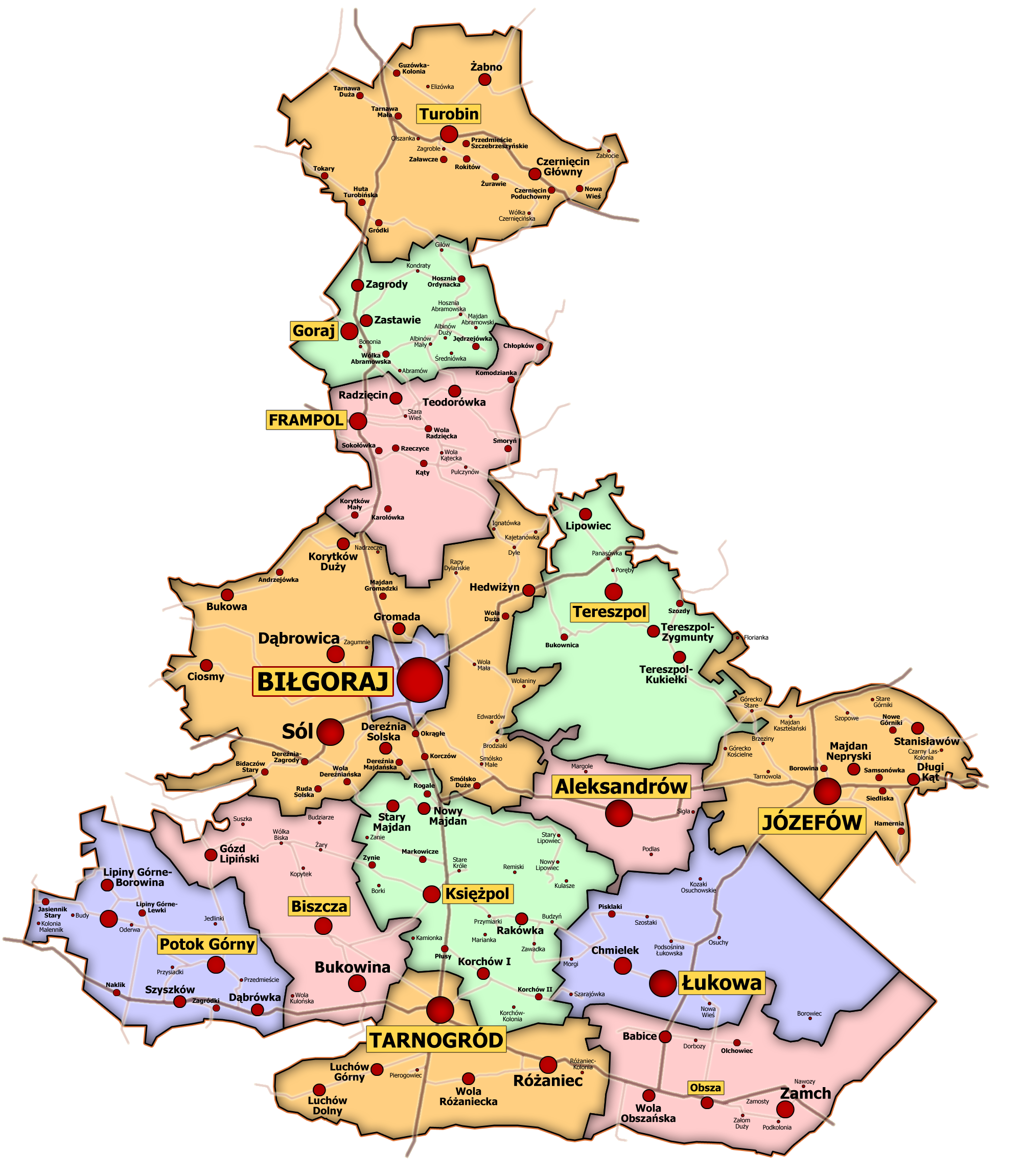
Map of the county subdivided into gminas

The division of a county into gminas
Gmina	Type	Area (km^{2})	Population (2025)	Seat
Aleksandrów	rural	54.26	3,119	Aleksandrów
Biłgoraj	urban	21.10	24,312	Biłgoraj
Biłgoraj	rural	262.64	13,335	Biłgoraj (Note: Seat is not part of the gmina.)
Biszcza	rural	106.31	3,658	Biszcza
Frampol	urban-rural	107.61	5,511	Frampol
Goraj	urban-rural	67.87	3,776	Goraj
Józefów	urban-rural	126.46	6,179	Józefów
Księżpol	rural	141.28	6,577	Księżpol
Łukowa	rural	148.72	3,810	Łukowa
Obsza	rural	113.23	3,957	Obsza
Potok Górny	rural	111.16	4,840	Potok Górny
Tarnogród	urban-rural	114.25	6,054	Tarnogród
Tereszpol	rural	144.01	3,734	Tereszpol
Turobin	urban-rural	162.19	5,311	Turobin

== Demographics ==
As of 2025, the county had a total population of 94,173 residents, accounting for almost 4,8% of the Lublin Voivodeship's total population, making it the 7th most populous county in the voivodeship (including city counties). Around 65% of the county's population lives in rural areas, while 35% resides in urban zones.

The total fertility rate in 2025 was estimated at 0,895 children per woman. Biłgoraj County's population reached its peak in 1998. The total population is expected to decline by 30% by 2060.

In 2025, about 46,293 of the county's residents were men, and 47,880 were women. Approximately 16.7% (15,700) of the population was age of 17 or less; 58.1% (54,711) were between the ages of 18 and 64 for men, and 18 and 59 for women; and 25.2% (23,762) were above the age of 64 for men and 60 for women. In the same year, the county had a population density of 56.129 people per square kilometer.

Vital statistics
Year	Population	Men	Women	Urban	Rural	Live births	Deaths total	Natural change	Total fertility rate
2025	94,173	46,293	47,880	32,563	61,610	471	1063	-592	0,895
2024	95,219	46,840	48,379	32,910	62,309	544	1074	-530	0,985
2023	96,158	47,323	48,835	32,423	63,735	563	1062	-499	0,988
2022	97,055	47,733	49,322	32,764	64,291	691	1106	-415	1,185
2021	97,771	48,096	49,675	33,063	64,708	710	1432	-722	1,170
2020	100,333	49,454	50,879	33,323	67,010	826	1261	-435	1,204
2019	100,919	49,765	51,154	33,551	67,368	865	1030	-165	1,240
2018	101,435	50,005	51,430	33,671	67,764	884	1094	-210	1,234
2017	101,949	50,254	51,695	33,876	68,073	955	1063	-108	1,316
2016	102,272	50,391	51,881	33,874	68,398	951	1067	-116	1,294
2015	102,647	50,576	52,071	34,232	68,415	954	1050	-96	1,284
2014	102,941	50,685	52,256	34,355	68,586	906	1008	-102	1,202
2013	103,366	50,922	52,444	34,635	68,731	885	1032	-147	1,164
2012	103,569	51,044	52,525	34,732	68,837	1040	1037	3	1,354
2011	103,727	51,117	52,610	34,766	68,961	974	1101	-127	1,249
2010	103,005	50,785	52,220	34,386	68,619	1050	1016	34	1,316
2009	103,226	50,865	52,361	34,363	68,863	1102	1164	-62	1,399
2008	103,623	50,989	52,634	34,571	69,052	1104	1057	47	1,415
2007	103,759	51,125	52,634	34,477	69,282	1043	1062	-19	1,334
2006	104,001	51,309	52,692	34,500	69,501	1039	1069	-30	1,343
2005	104,423	51,552	52,871	34,460	69,963	N/A	N/A	N/A	N/A
2004	104,648	51,717	52,931	34,312	70,336	N/A	N/A	N/A	N/A
2003	104,877	51,795	53,082	34,242	70,635	N/A	N/A	N/A	N/A
2002	104,874	51,812	53,062	33,957	70,917	N/A	N/A	N/A	N/A
2001	105,031	51,901	53,130	33,820	71,211	N/A	N/A	N/A	N/A
2000	105,448	52,139	53,309	33,950	71,498	N/A	N/A	N/A	N/A
1999	105,375	52,064	53,311	33,865	71,510	N/A	N/A	N/A	N/A
1998	106,301	52,718	53,583	34,697	71,604	N/A	N/A	N/A	N/A
1997	106,223	52,668	53,555	34,421	71,802	N/A	N/A	N/A	N/A
1996	106,127	52,610	53,517	34,229	71,898	N/A	N/A	N/A	N/A
1995	105,960	52,504	53,456	34,045	71,915	N/A	N/A	N/A	N/A

Population projections
Year	Population	Men	Women
2025	94,674	46,556	48,118
2030	91,253	44,786	46,467
2035	87,220	42,750	44,470
2040	82,980	40,629	42,351
2045	78,684	38,492	40,192
2050	74,392	36,368	38,024
2055	70,124	34,258	35,866
2060	65,860	32,117	33,743

== Politics ==
=== The executive board ===
The executive body of Biłgoraj County is the executive board. It consists of the starosta (head of the board), the deputy starosta, and other members. The board is elected by the district council. The current board was elected on May 6, 2024.

- Andrzej Szarlip — Starosta of Biłgoraj County,
- Beata Strzałka — Deputy Starosta of Biłgoraj County,
- Tomasz Rogala — Full-time Member of the County Board,
- Bartłomiej Świtała — Full-time Member of the County Board,
- Jan Małysza — Member of the Board,
- Małgorzata Liwosz-Rudy — Secretary of Biłgoraj County.

=== The district council ===
The Biłgoraj District Council is a subregional-level elected legislature. The current council was elected on April 7, 2024.

Composition
Political party	Members	Affiliation
▌Law and Justice (PiS)	12	Government
▌Third Way (PSL-PL2050)	3	Opposition
▌KWW — Biłgorajszczyzna	3	Opposition
▌KWW — Prawicowa Polska Marcina Romanowskiego	3	Opposition
Total	21	—

=== National elections ===
Biłgoraj County is part of Sejm constituency no. 7 (Chełm) for the lower house of the Polish Parliament.

For the upper house of the Parliament of Poland, Biłgoraj County is part of the Senate constituency of Zamość.

For elections to the European Parliament, Biłgoraj County is part of the Lublin constituency.

== Symbols ==
Since June 27, 2000, the county symbol is three silver bars, above which is a half-bear, half-eagle with a golden crown around its neck. This is a combination of the Korczak (three silver bars) coat of arms, used by the founder of Biłgoraj, Adam Gorajski, and the symbolism of the Przemyśl Land (eagle) and the Chełm Land (bear).
