= National Museum in Kielce =

Coordinates: 50°52′09″N 20°37′39″E

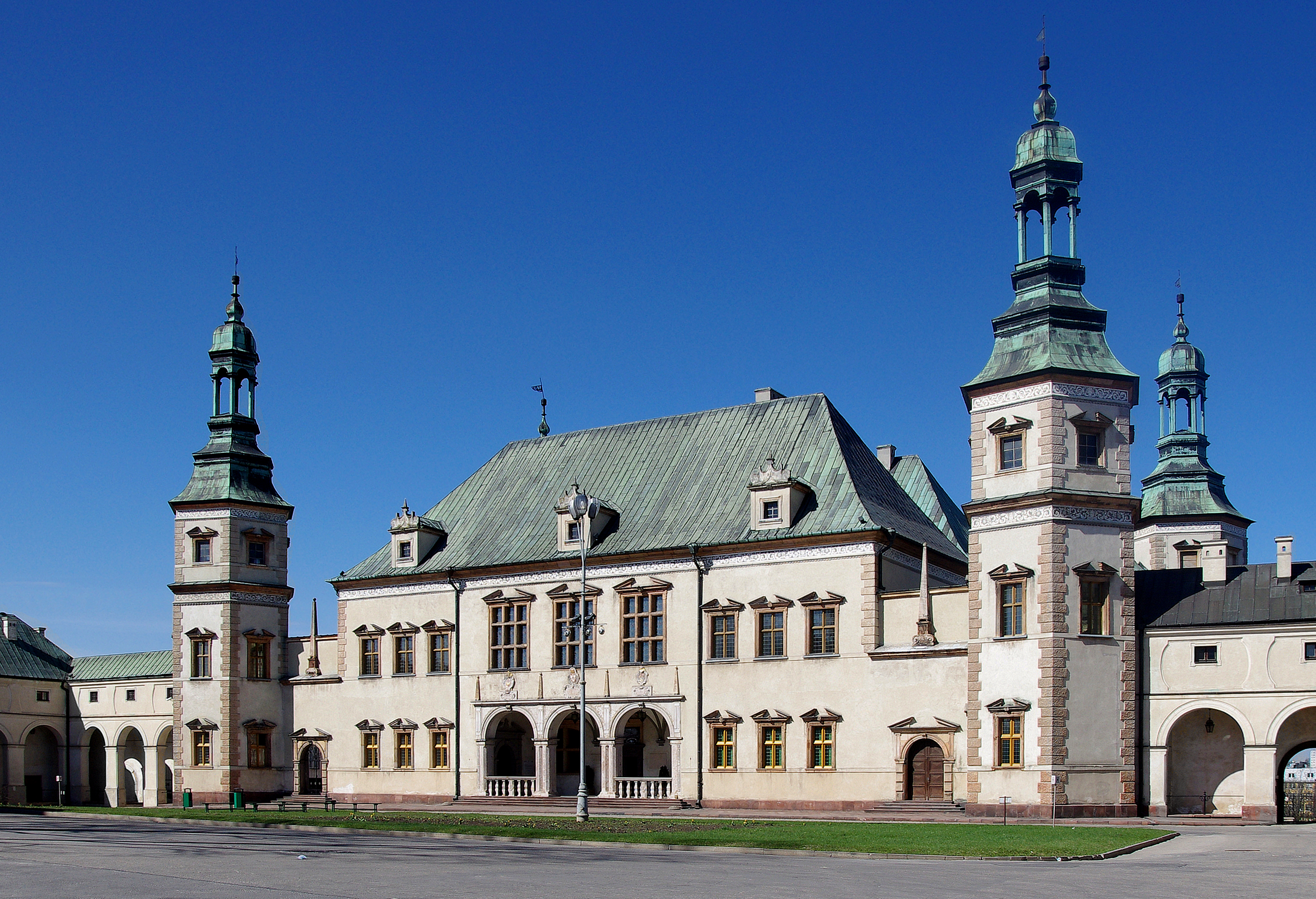
The National Museum in Kielce, the former Palace of the Krakow Bishops

National Museum in Kielce (Polish: Muzeum Narodowe w Kielcach) is a museum located in the Palace of the Kraków Bishops, Kielce, Poland. Its collections include valuable exhibits in the field of painting, handicraft, folk art, archeology, and natural sciences.

== History ==
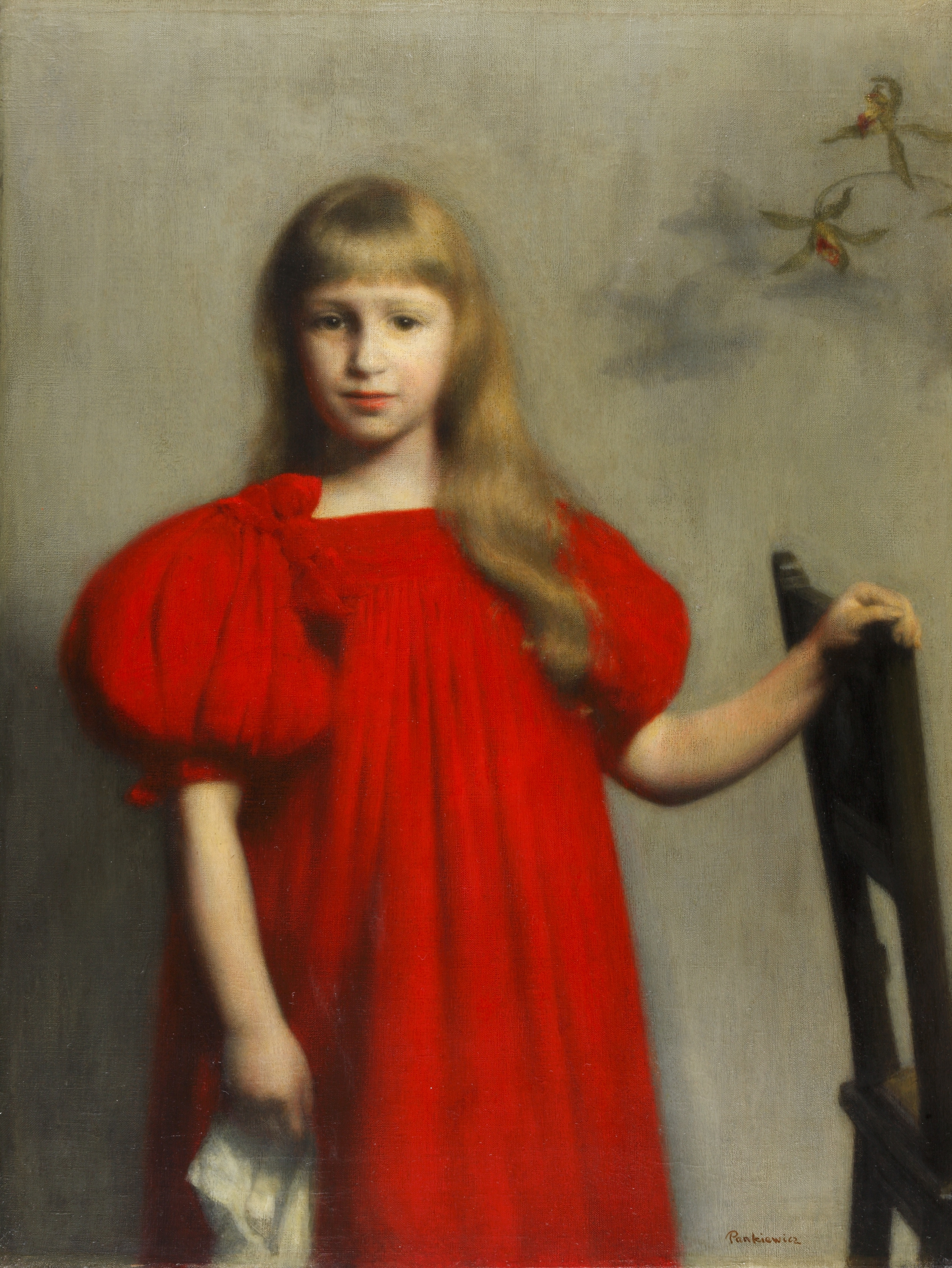
Girl in a Red Dress by Józef Pankiewicz

The precise date the museum opened is unknown as the founding documents are lost, however the first item (a petrified tree) was written into the inventory book on 10 October 1908 by Szymon Tadeusz Włoszek (1843-1933), a veteran of the January Uprising. This date is taken as the founding date of the institution.

In 1922 the museum made an attempt to acquire the Palace of the Kraków Bishops in Kielce, however, this was unsuccessful. During the Second World War, the museum did not operate and many items were plundered by the invaders, however Edmund Massalski managed to hide some of the collection and the museum resumed operations immediately after the way.

In 1971, by the resolution of the Provincial Branch of National Council, the palace complex with adjacent buildings was transferred to the Świętokrzyskie Museum, followed by the September 18, 1971 grand opening of the first two expositions: one on the ground floor, called the Nine Centuries of Kielce; and, on the second floor: the Gallery of Historic Interiors. In 1975, in recognition of its contribution to the development of culture, the facility was given the rank of the National Museum by the Minister of Culture and Art.

== Collections ==
The permanent exhibits at the museum include Western European painting from 17th to 18th century, Polish painting from 17th to 20th century, applied arts, archeology, Numismatics, armoury, and others. Especially interesting are the works of Italian-born Johann Baptist von Lampi the Elder (Giambattista Lampi, known as Jan Chrzciciel Lampi in Polish), Leopold Gottlieb, Olga Boznańska, Józef Chełmoński, Aleksander Gierymski, Jacek Malczewski and Stanisław Wyspiański among others.

=== Polish art ===
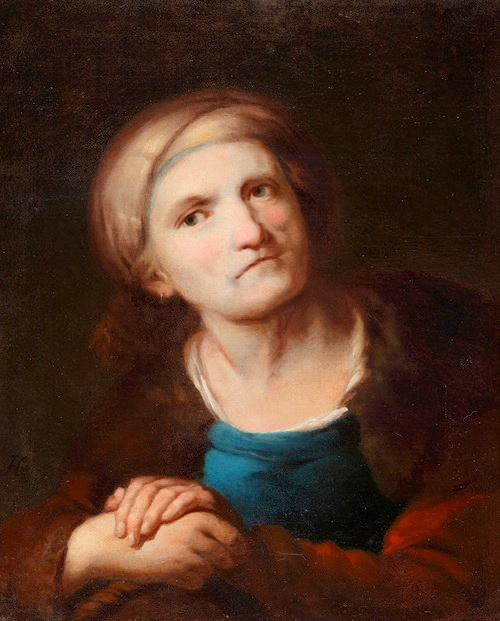
Rafał Hadziewicz Sibilla

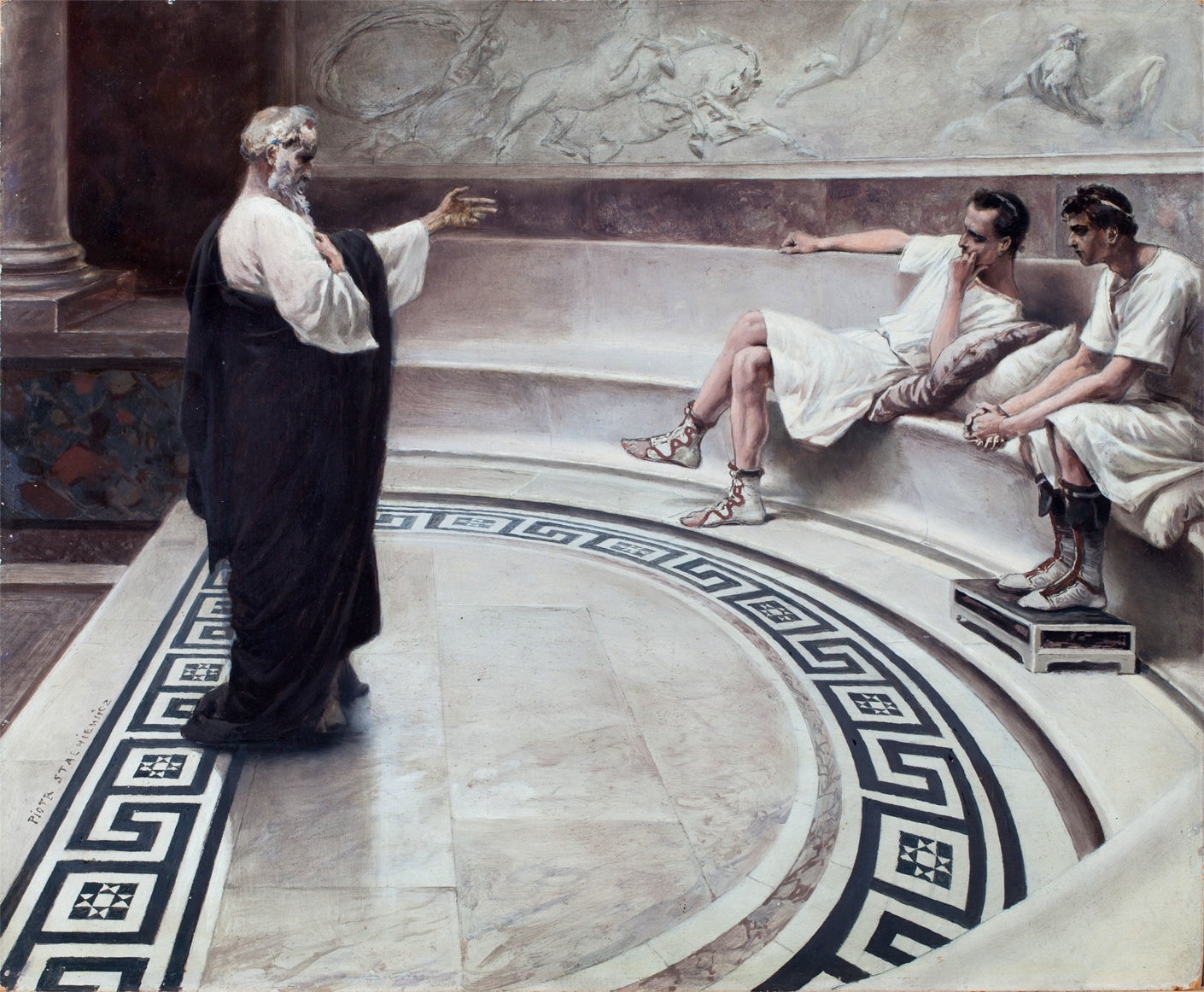
Piotr Stachiewicz St. Paul's Disputation with Petronius

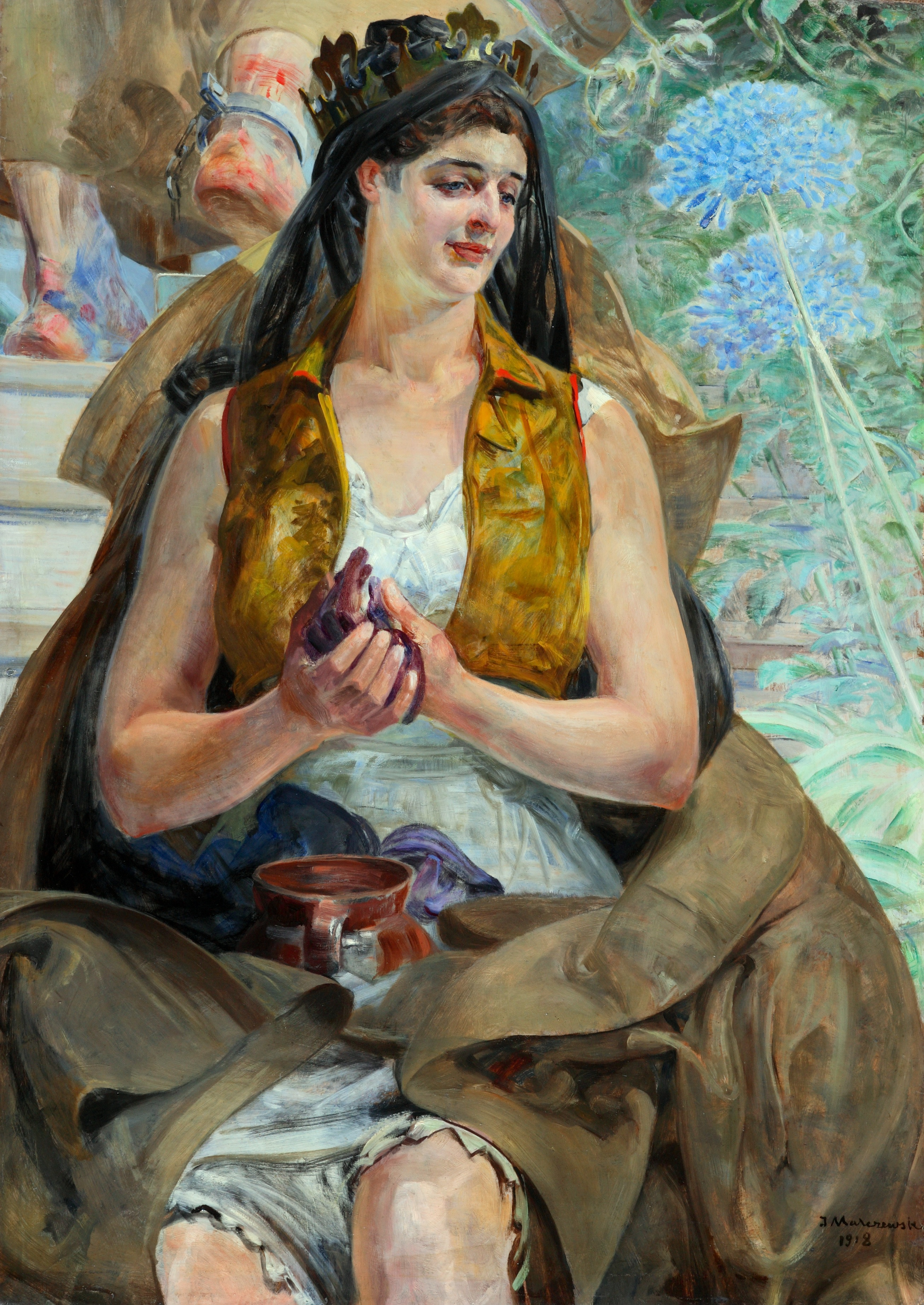
Jacek Malczewski Polonia

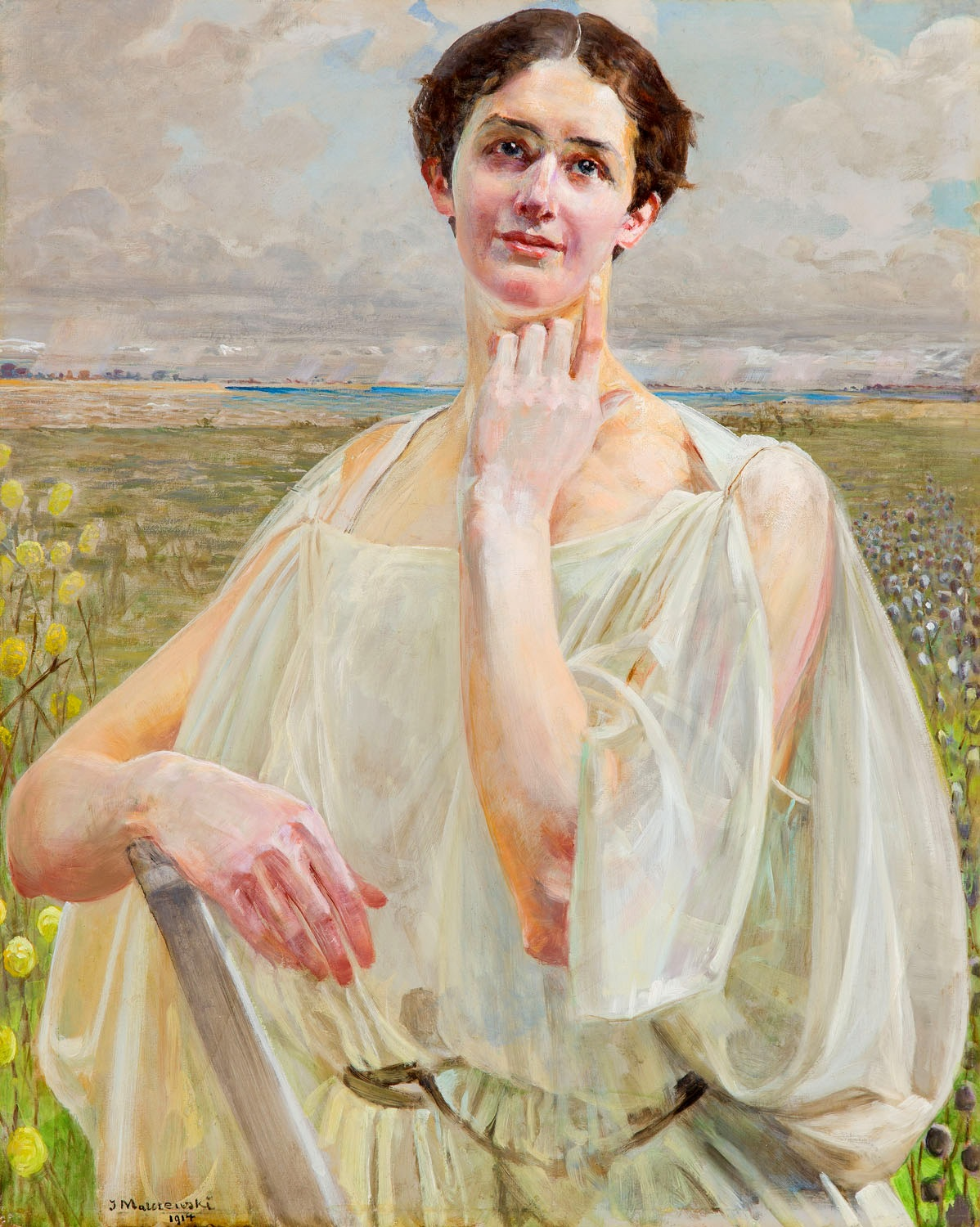
Jacek Malczewski Spring

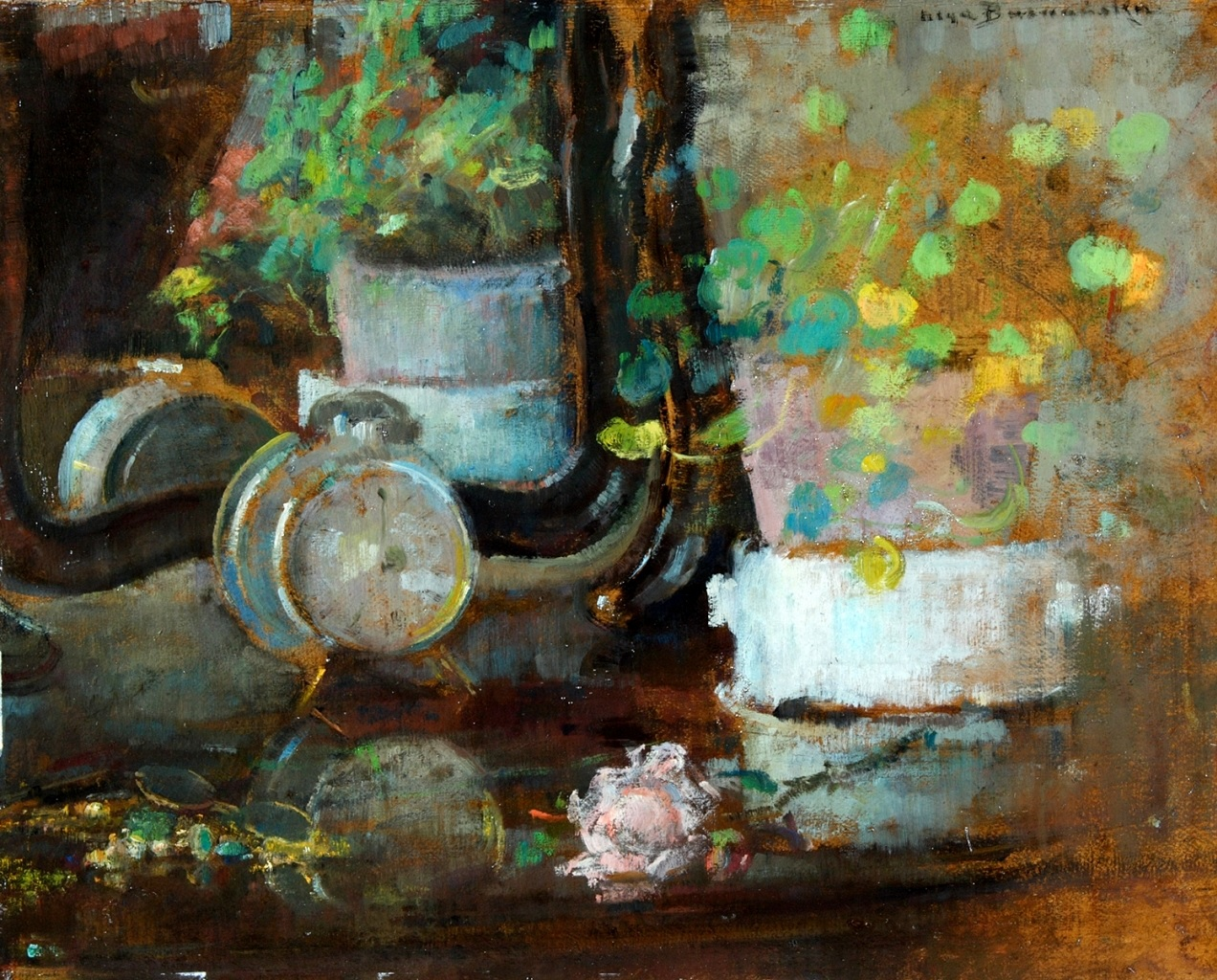
Olga Boznańska Still life with alarm clock

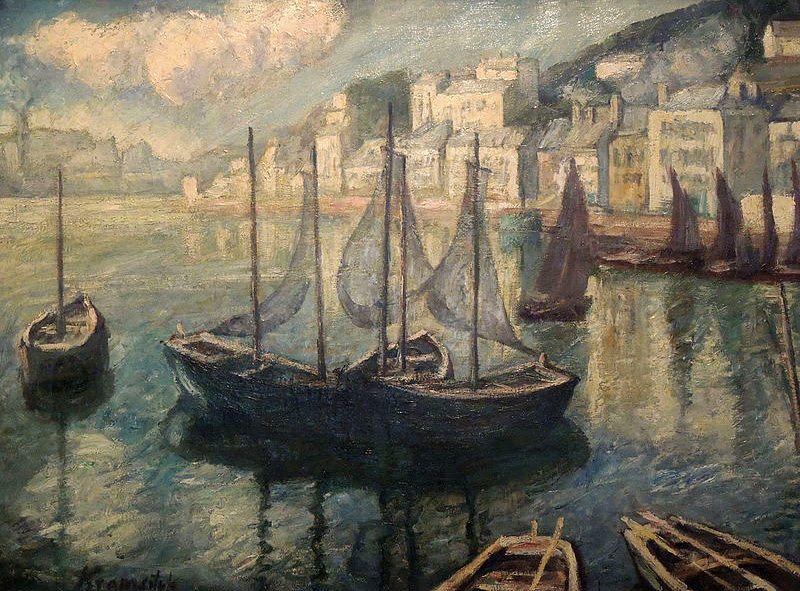
Roman Kramsztyk Breton harbour

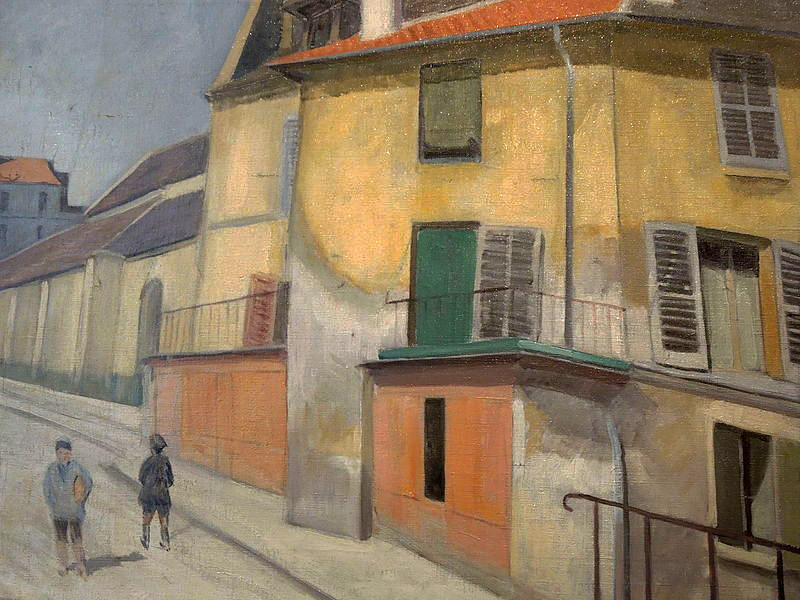
Marcin Samlicki A street in a town

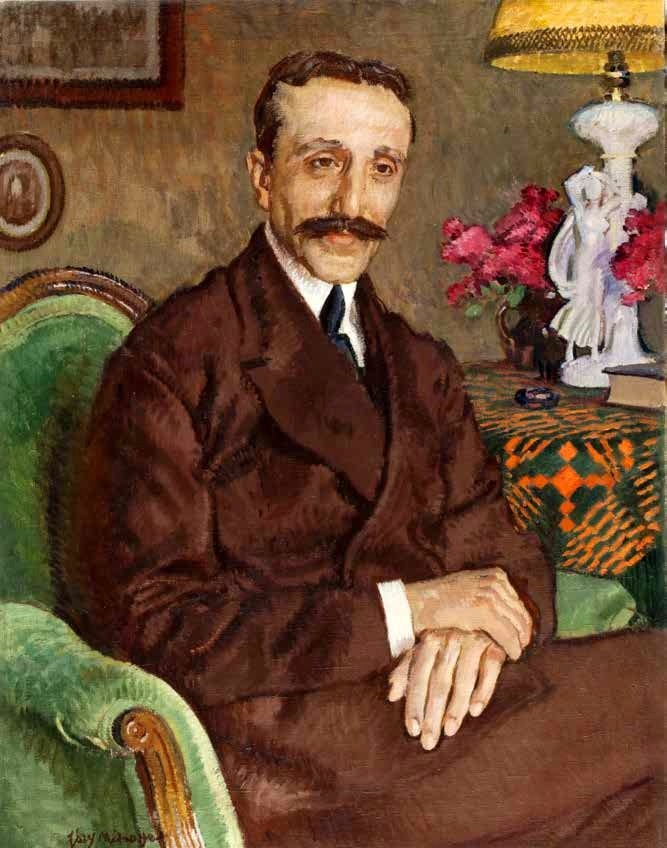
Józef Mehoffer Portrait of Maciej Radziwill

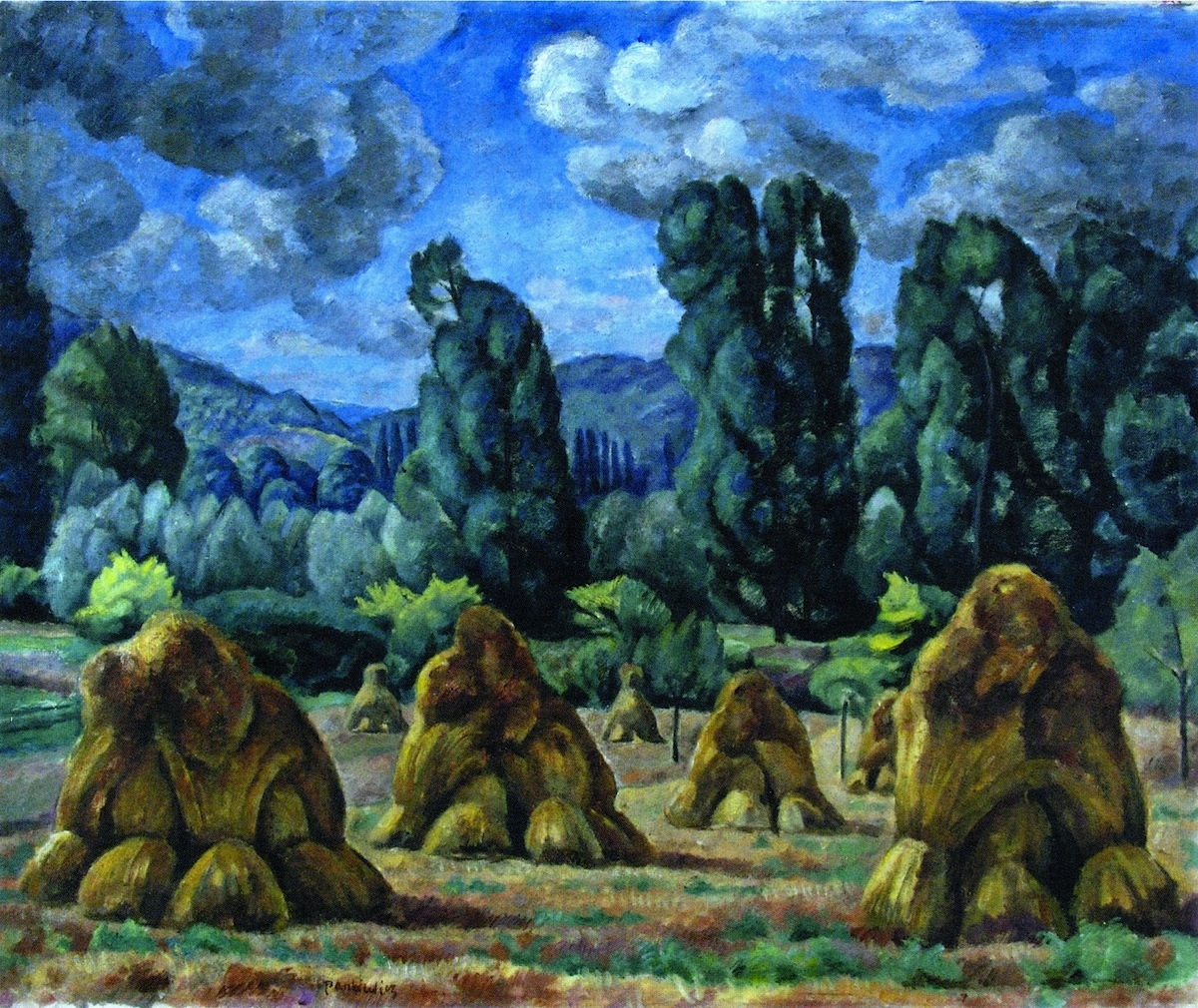
Józef Pankiewicz Hayrides

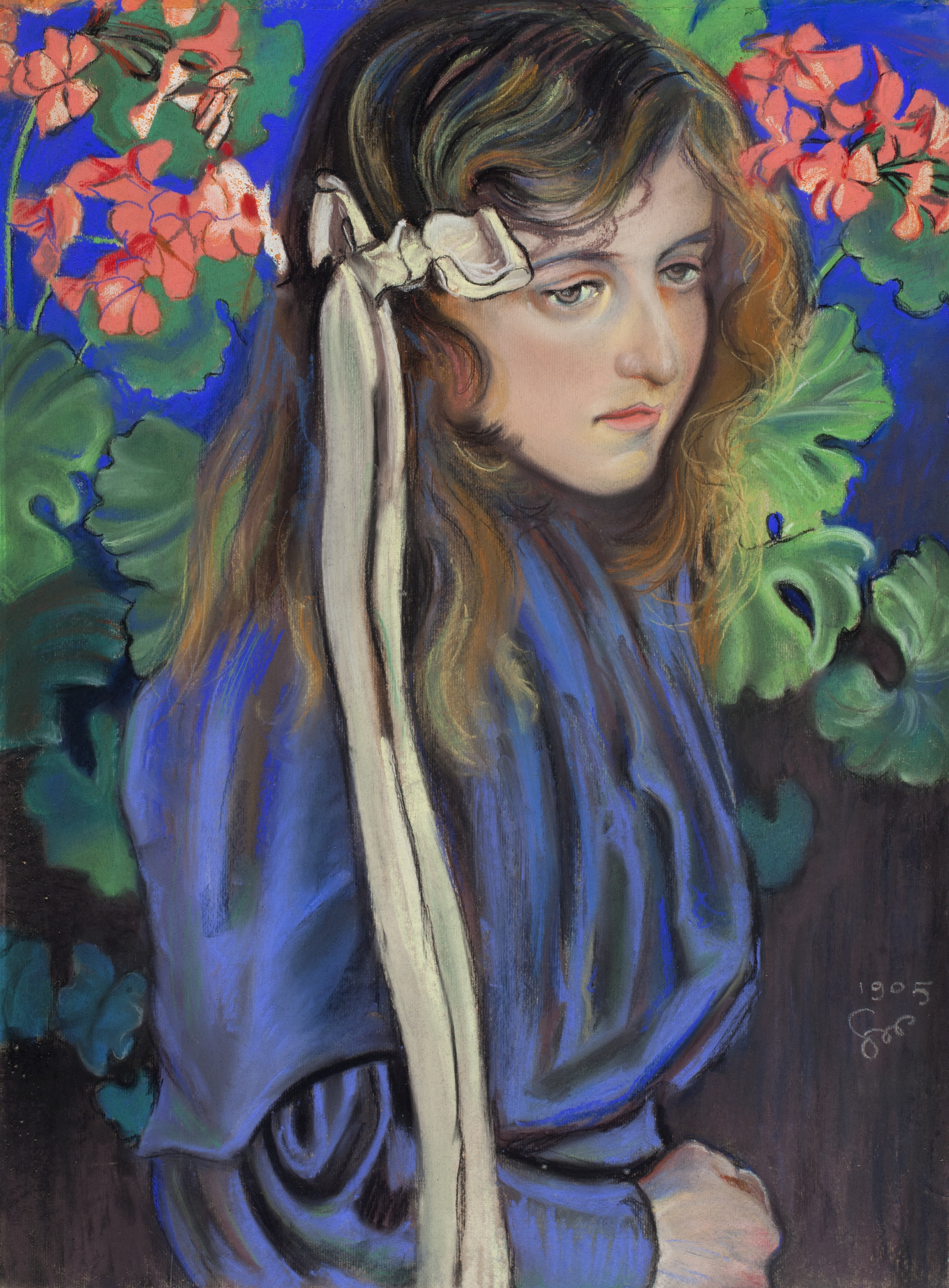
Stanisław Wyspiański Eliza Parenska

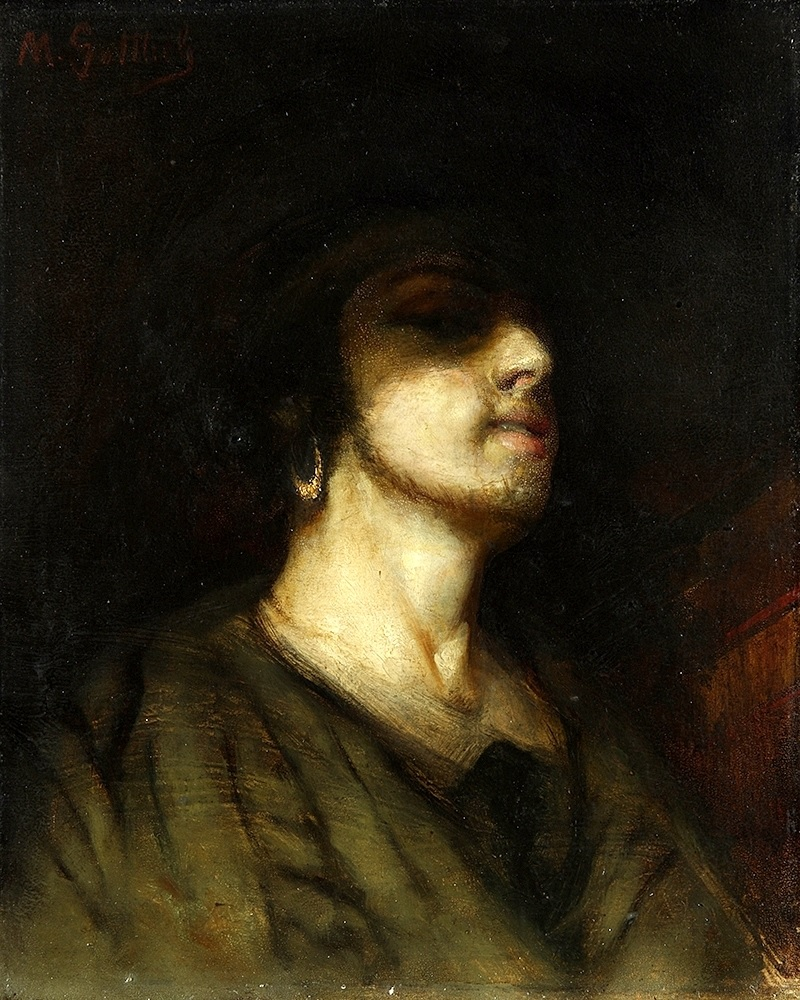
Maurycy Gottlieb Self-portrait

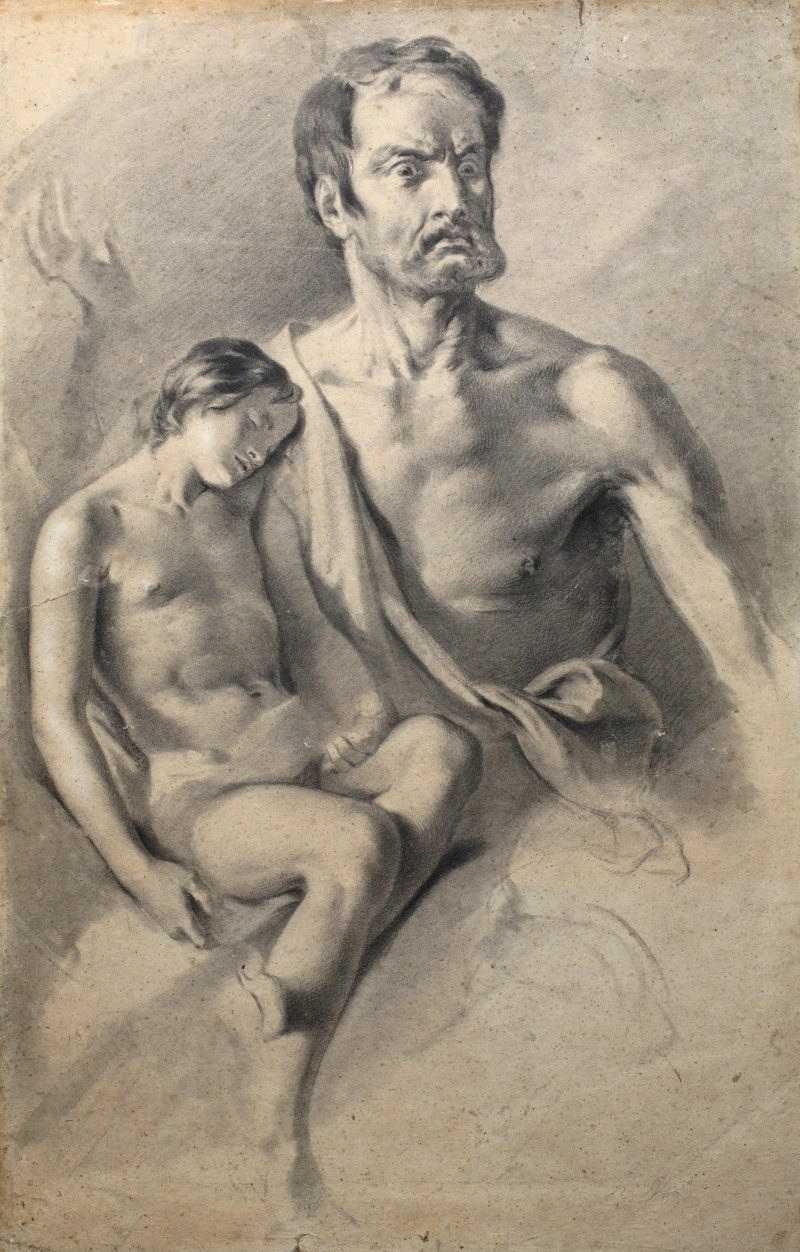
Rafał Hadziewicz Ugolino

=== Henryk Sienkiewicz Museum in Oblęgorek ===
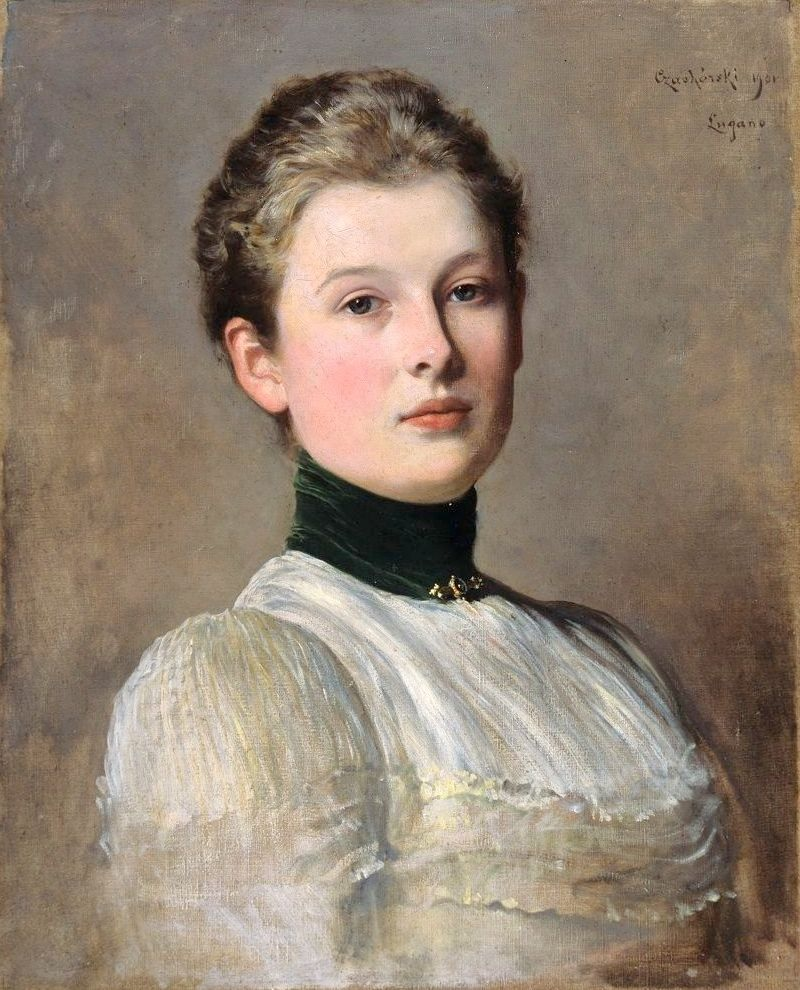
Władysław Czachórski Portrait of Jadwiga Sienkiewicz

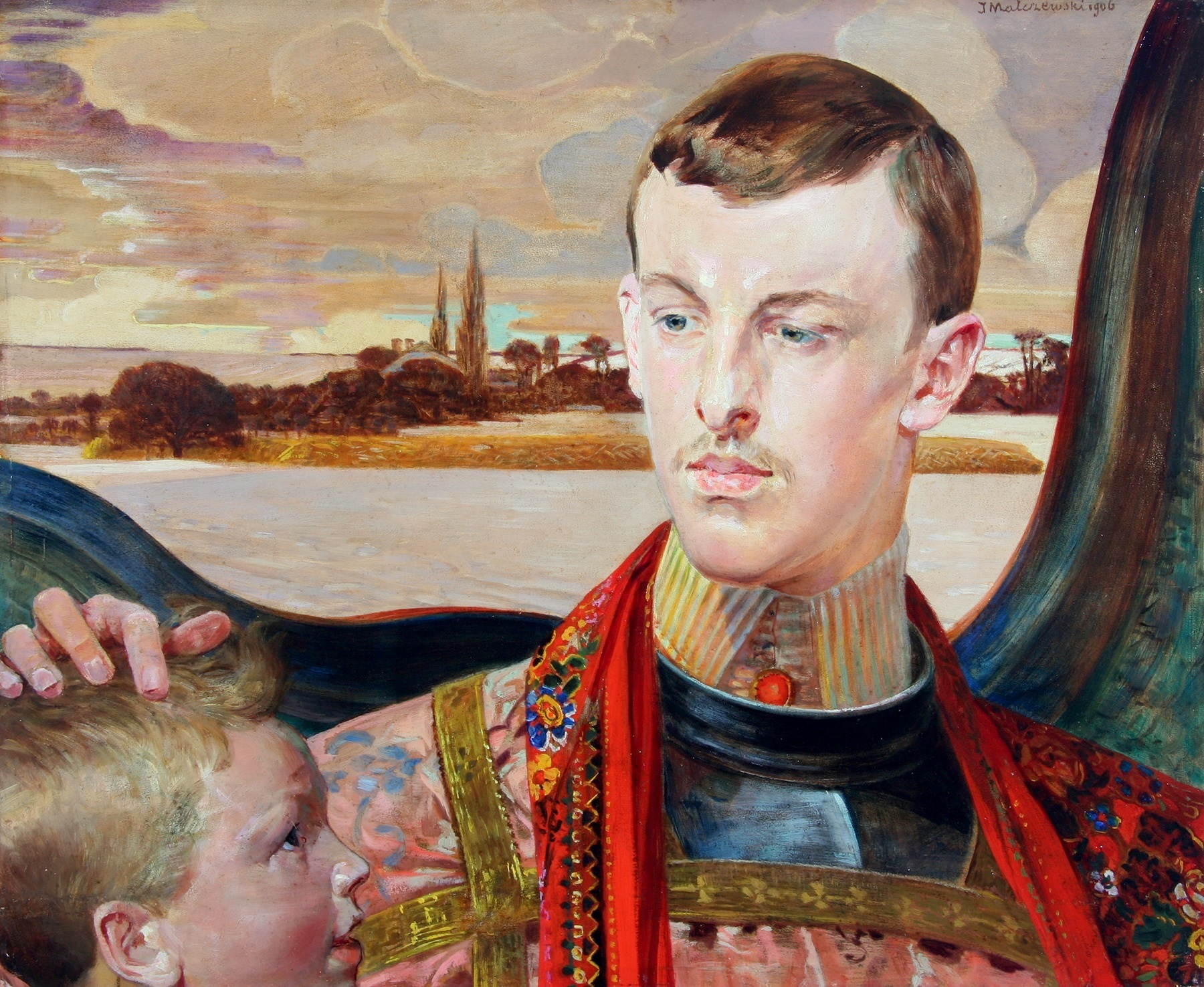
Jacek Malczewski Henryk Józef Sienkiewicz

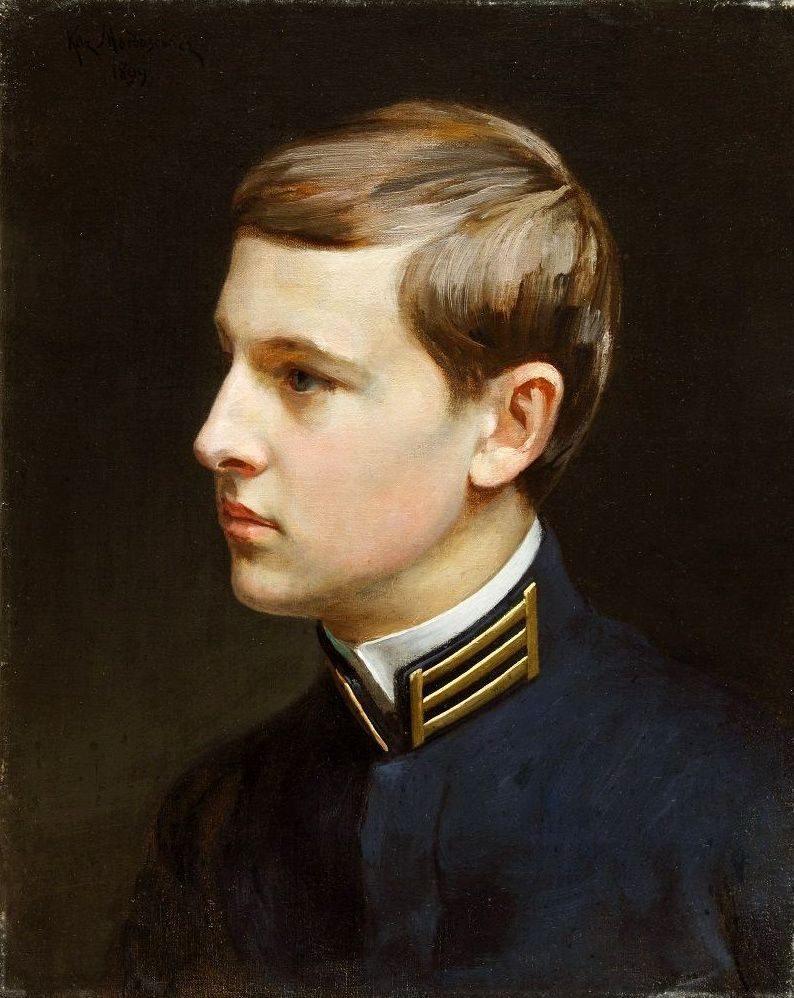
Kazimierz Mordasewicz Henryk Józef Sienkiewicz

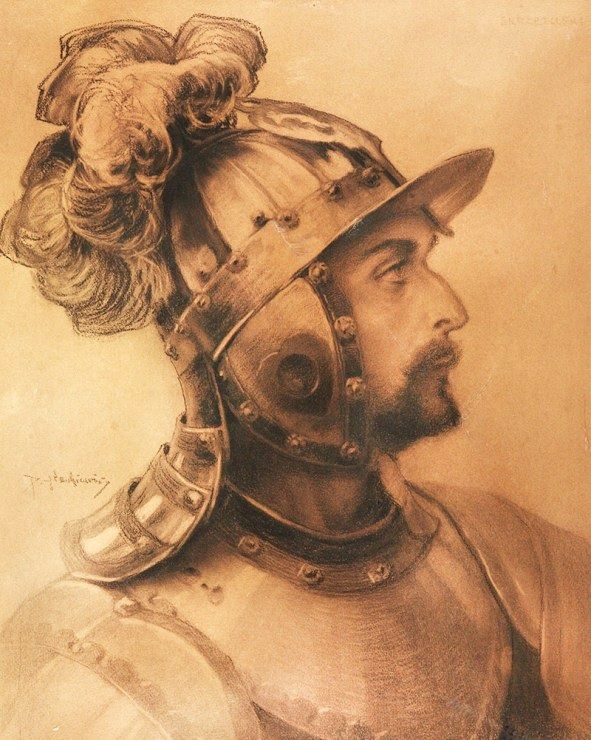
Piotr Stachiewicz Skrzetuski

== Divisions ==
- Former Krakow Bishops Palace
- Henryk Sienkiewicz Palace in Oblęgorek
- Museum of Stefan Żeromski's School Years
- Museum of the Dialogue of Cultures
- Museum of Archeology in Wiślica
