= Zofia Czernow =

Polish politician and deputy

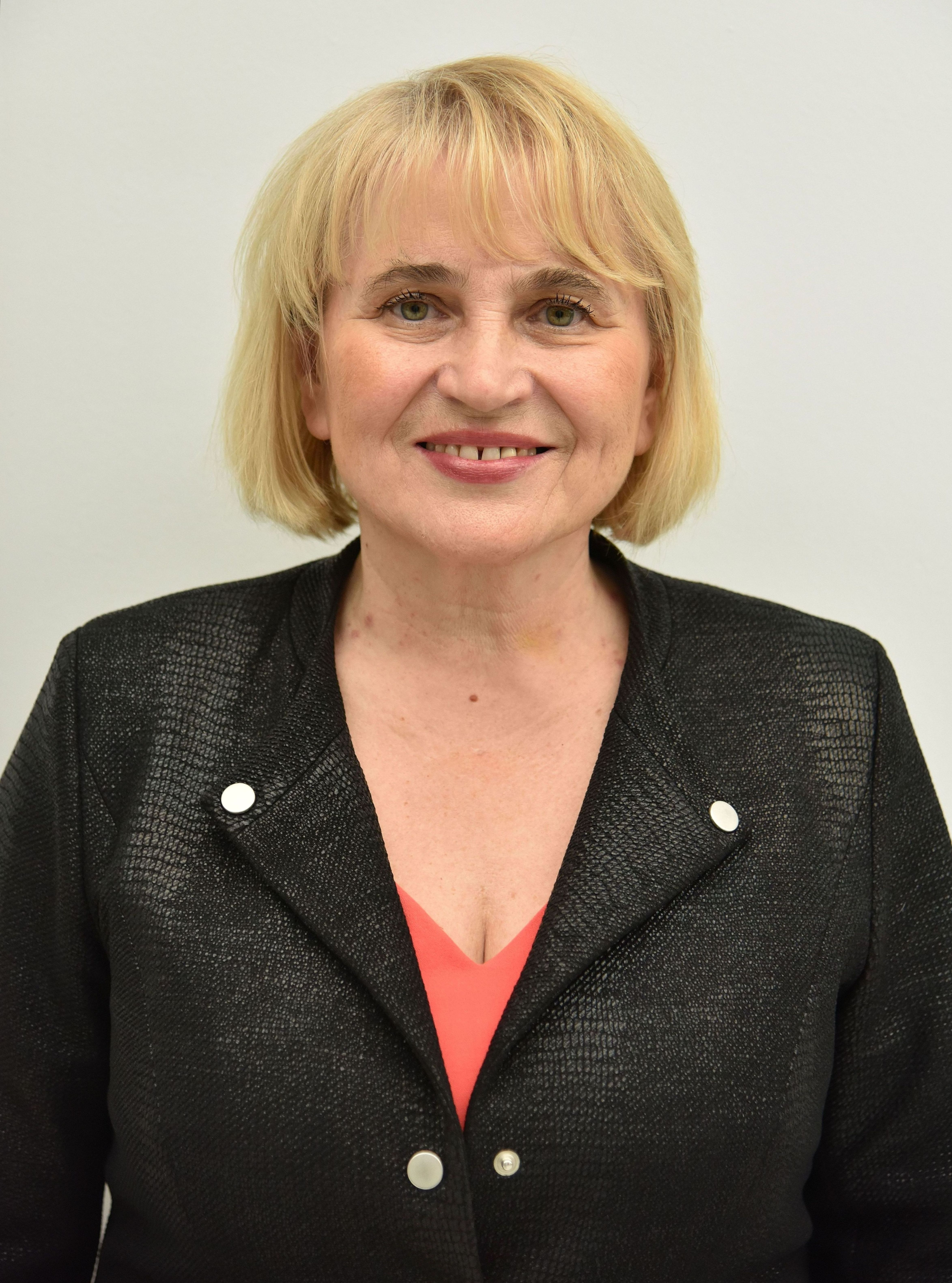

Member of the Sejm
- Incumbent
- Assumed office 8 November 2011

Personal details
- Born: 1950 (age 75–76) Wola Obszańska
- Party: Civic Platform

Zofia Czernow (born 1950) is an economist and Polish politician. Previously involved in local politics in Jelenia Góra, she was elected to the Sejm, lower house of the Polish parliament, in 2011, 2015, 2019 and 2023.
