= Olchowiec =

Olchowiec may refer to the following places:

- Olchowiec, Biłgoraj County in Lublin Voivodeship (east Poland)
- Olchowiec, Chełm County in Lublin Voivodeship (east Poland)
- Olchowiec, Krasnystaw County in Lublin Voivodeship (east Poland)
- Olchowiec, Subcarpathian Voivodeship (south-east Poland)
- Olchowiec, Bieszczady County in Subcarpathian Voivodeship (south-east Poland)
- Olchowiec, West Pomeranian Voivodeship (north-west Poland)
