= Józef Brodowski the Younger =

Polish painter (1828–1900)

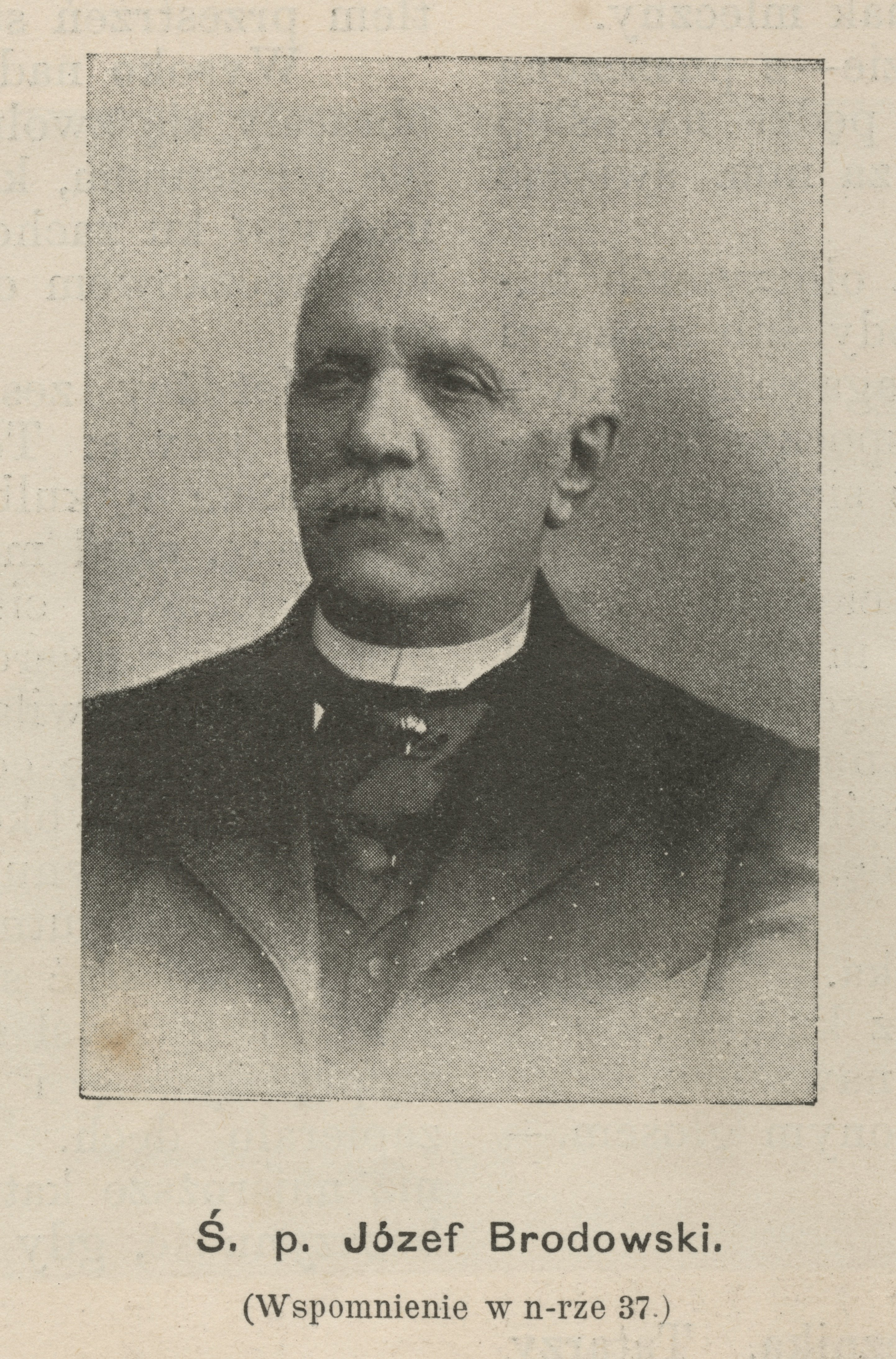

Józef Brodowski (17 January 1828 – 5 September 1900) was a Polish painter. He is referred to as The Younger to distinguish him from Józef Brodowski (c. 1775/81–1853), who apparently was not related.

== Biography ==
He was born in Warsaw. His father was the painter Antoni Brodowski, who died when Józef was only four. From 1844 to 1851, he studied with Rafał Hadziewicz, one of his father's former students, at the School of Fine Arts in Warsaw. His most important influences, however, came from Jan Feliks Piwarski, a landscape painter who was one of the first in Poland to promote the concept of painting en plein aire. He joined a group led by January Suchodolski that travelled on painting and drawing excursions throughout the country.

In 1853, he received a scholarship and went to Saint Petersburg to enroll at the Imperial Academy of Arts, where he studied with the battle painter, Bogdan Willewalde. He graduated in 1856 and, the following year, went to Paris to study in the studios of Horace Vernet. After a year there, he travelled in Italy, then returned to Warsaw and remained there the rest of his life.

He is primarily known for his landscapes and battle scenes. One of the most notable is a large canvas depicting King John II Casimir Vasa at the Battle of Berestechko, done together with Juliusz Kossak. Horses are a prominent feature in most of his works. From 1868 to 1890, he was a regular contributor to the magazine Tygodnik Illustrowany. He died in 1900 and was buried at the Powązki Cemetery in Warsaw.

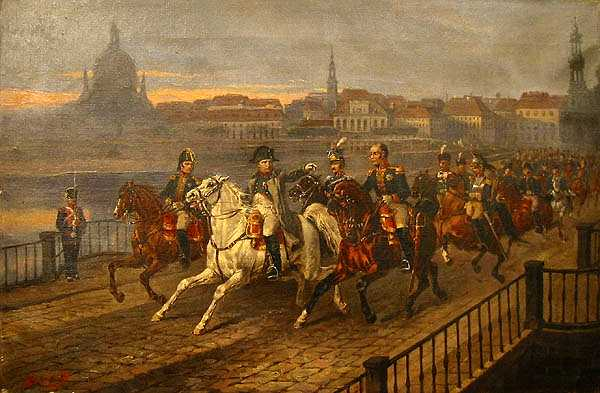
Napoleon Crossing the Elbe, 1895

His older brother, Tadeusz, was also a painter, but died too young to leave a significant body of work.

== See also ==
- List of Polish painters
