= Gmina Obsza =

Gmina Obsza Obsza Commune
- Gmina
- Interactive map of Gmina Obsza
- Coordinates (Obsza): 50°19′N 22°58′E
- Country: Poland
- Voivodeship: Lublin
- County: Biłgoraj
- Seat: Obsza

Area
  - Total: 115.8 km^{2} (44.7 sq mi)

Population (2006)
  - Total: 4,411
  - Density: 38.09/km^{2} (98.66/sq mi)
- Website: http://www.obsza.gmina.woi.lublin.pl

Gmina Obsza is a rural gmina (administrative district) in Biłgoraj County, Lublin Voivodeship, in eastern Poland. Its seat is the village of Obsza, which lies approximately 31 kilometres (19 mi) south-east of Biłgoraj and 108 km (67 mi) south of the regional capital Lublin.

The gmina covers an area of 113.23 square kilometres (43.7 sq mi), and as of 2006 its total population is 4,411.

The gmina contains part of the protected area called Puszcza Solska Landscape Park.

== Villages ==
Gmina Obsza contains the villages and settlements of Babice, Dorbozy, Obsza, Olchowiec, Wola Obszańska and Zamch.

== Neighbouring gminas ==
Gmina Obsza is bordered by the gminas of Cieszanów, Łukowa, Narol, Stary Dzików, Susiec and Tarnogród.
