= Dorbozy =

- Village
- Location within Poland
- Coordinates: 50°21′N 22°57′E
- Country: Poland
- Voivodeship: Lublin
- County: Biłgoraj
- Gmina: Obsza

Population
  - Total: 198

Dorbozy [dɔrˈbɔzɨ] is a village in the administrative district of Gmina Obsza, within Biłgoraj County, Lublin Voivodeship, in eastern Poland.
