= Antoni Brodowski =

Polish painter (1784–1832)

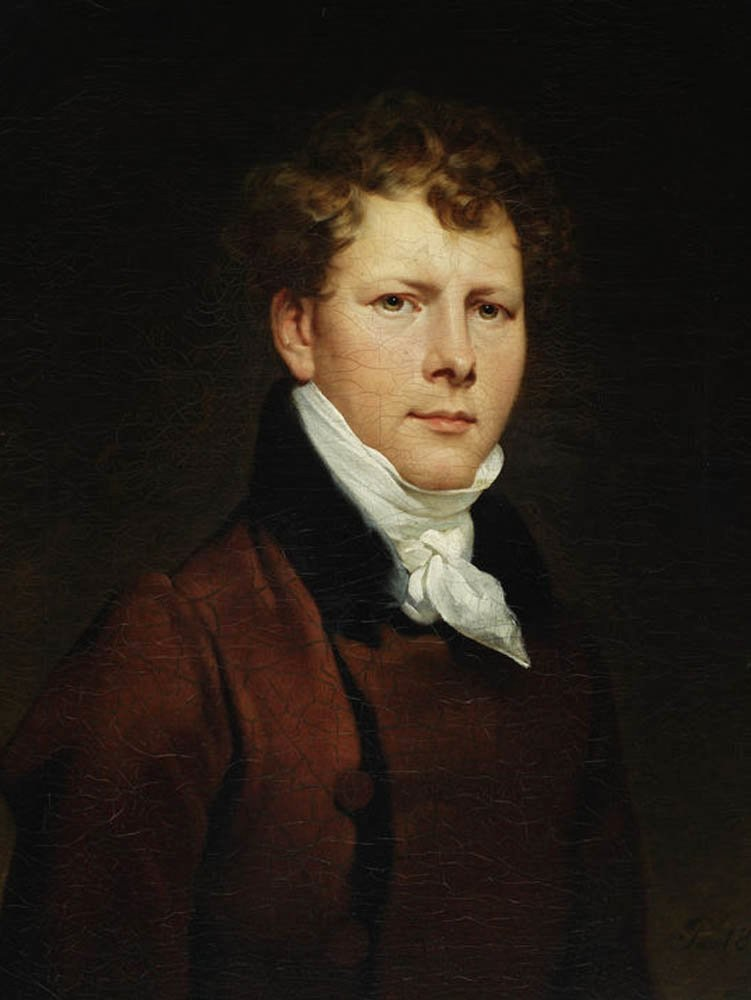
- Self-portrait (1813)
- Born: 26 December 1784; Warsaw, Polish-Lithuanian Commonwealth
- Died: 31 March 1832 (aged 47); Warsaw, Congress Poland
- Known for: Painter

Antoni Stanisław Brodowski (26 December 1784, Warsaw – 31 March 1832, Warsaw) was a Polish painter in the Classical style.

== Biography ==
According to the wishes expressed in his father's will, he began by studying mathematics. He also studied art, however, and his first lessons were with Marcello Bacciarelli. From 1805 to 1808, he lived in Paris, tutoring the children of Tadeusz Mostowski, a prominent politician and writer, while studying with the miniaturist, Jean-Baptiste Jacques Augustin. When he went back to Warsaw, he worked as a clerk in the Ministry of Justice.

He returned to Paris in 1809 on a government stipend; taking some lessons with Jacques-Louis David. Soon, he balked at the rules that required him to send paintings home for approval and his funds were cut off in 1812. He decided to stay in Paris and support himself by painting portraits while taking more lessons, this time from François Gérard, who became his patron.

Once again in Warsaw, and unable to make a living with his art, he was able to obtain work at the Ministry of the Interior, where his old employer Mostowski was Minister. In 1820, after winning a gold medal for his painting of Saul and David, he was appointed an Interim Professor of Drawing and Painting at the University of Warsaw. He became a full Professor in 1824 and remained there until the University was closed by Russian authorities in 1830.

In 1822, he became a member of the Warsaw Society of Friends of Learning and, in 1825, he was named a Knight, 3rd Class, in the Order of Saint Stanislaus.

Largely known as a portrait painter, he created likenesses of Julian Ursyn Niemcewicz, Archbishop Szczepan Hołowczyc, Stanisław Kostka Potocki, Józef Poniatowski, Wojciech Bogusławski, the historian Ludwik Osiński and Bishop Jan Paweł Woronicz, among many others. He also did numerous works on mythological and biblical topics and wrote a book entitled Co stanowi szkołę malarską (What is a School of Painting?).

Among his notable students were Rafał Hadziewicz and the sculptor Jakub Tatarkiewicz. He had two sons: Józef and Tadeusz, who both became painters.

== Selected paintings ==
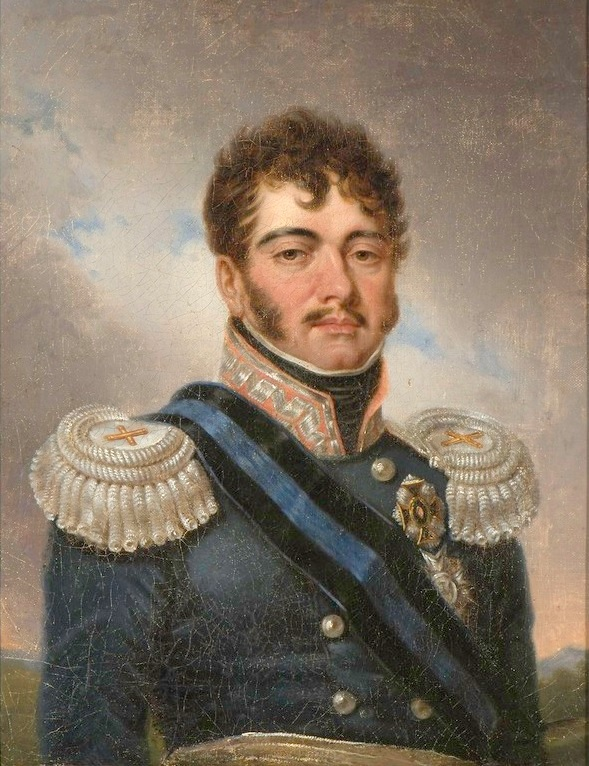
Portrait of Józef Poniatowski, ca. 1820

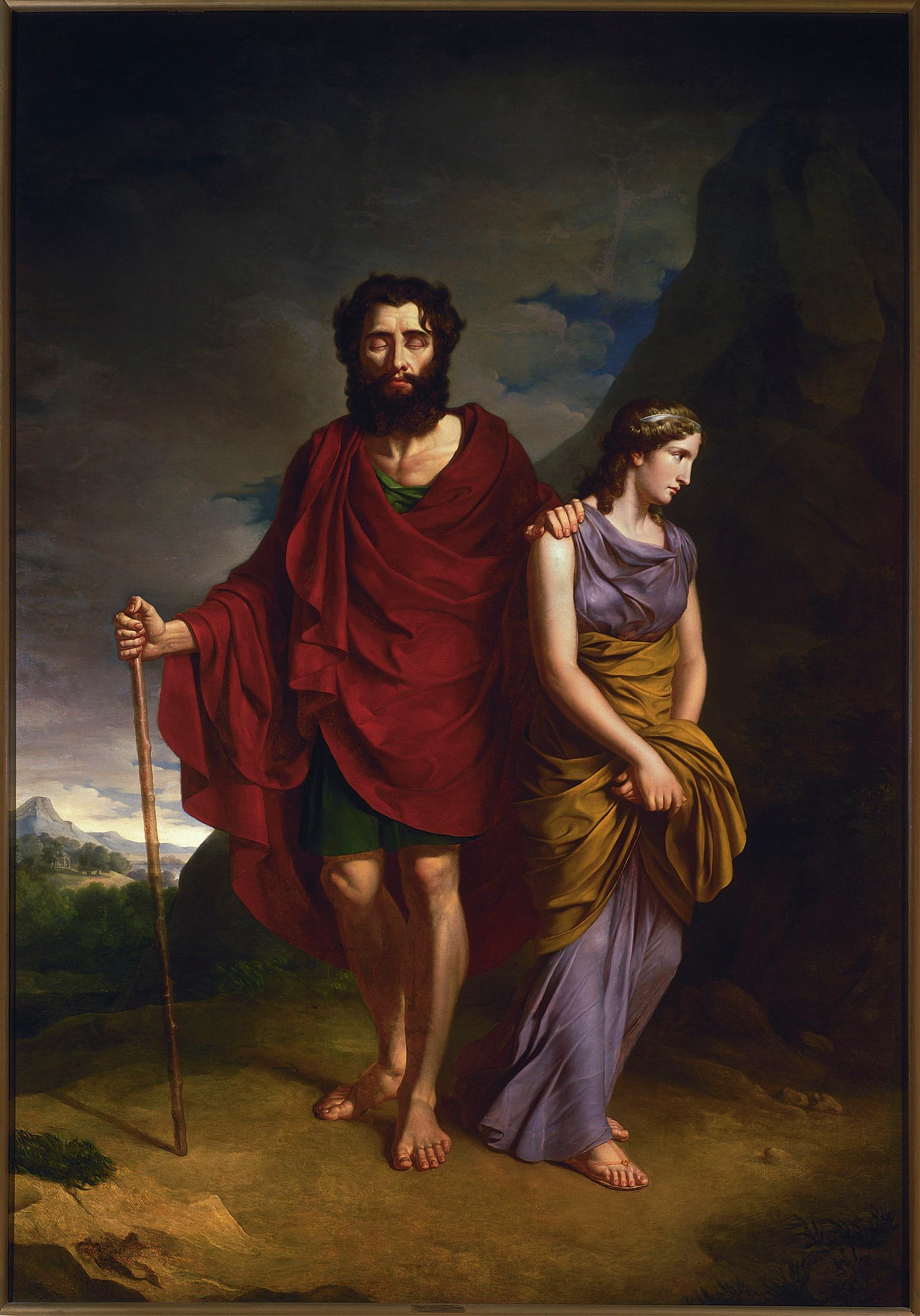
Oedipus and Antigone, 1828

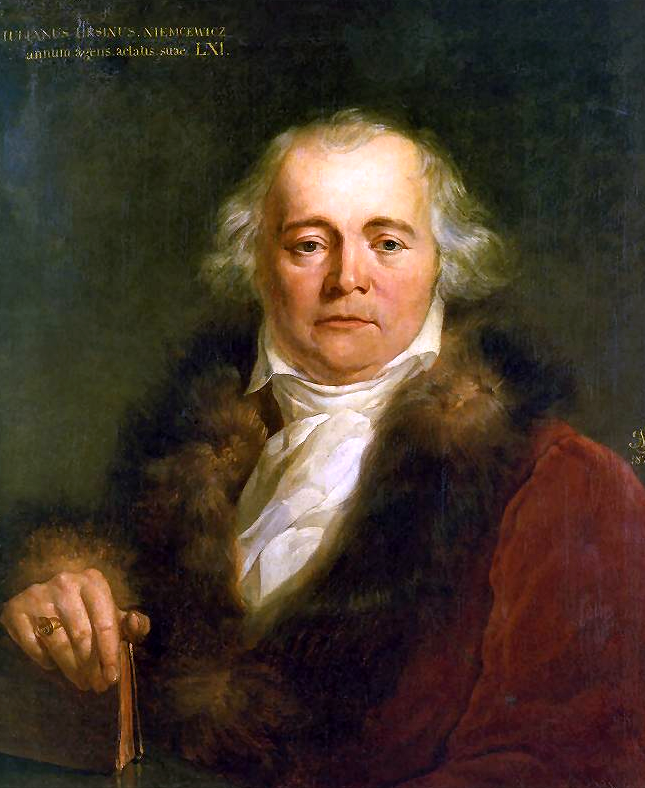
Portrait of Julian Ursyn Niemcewicz, 1820

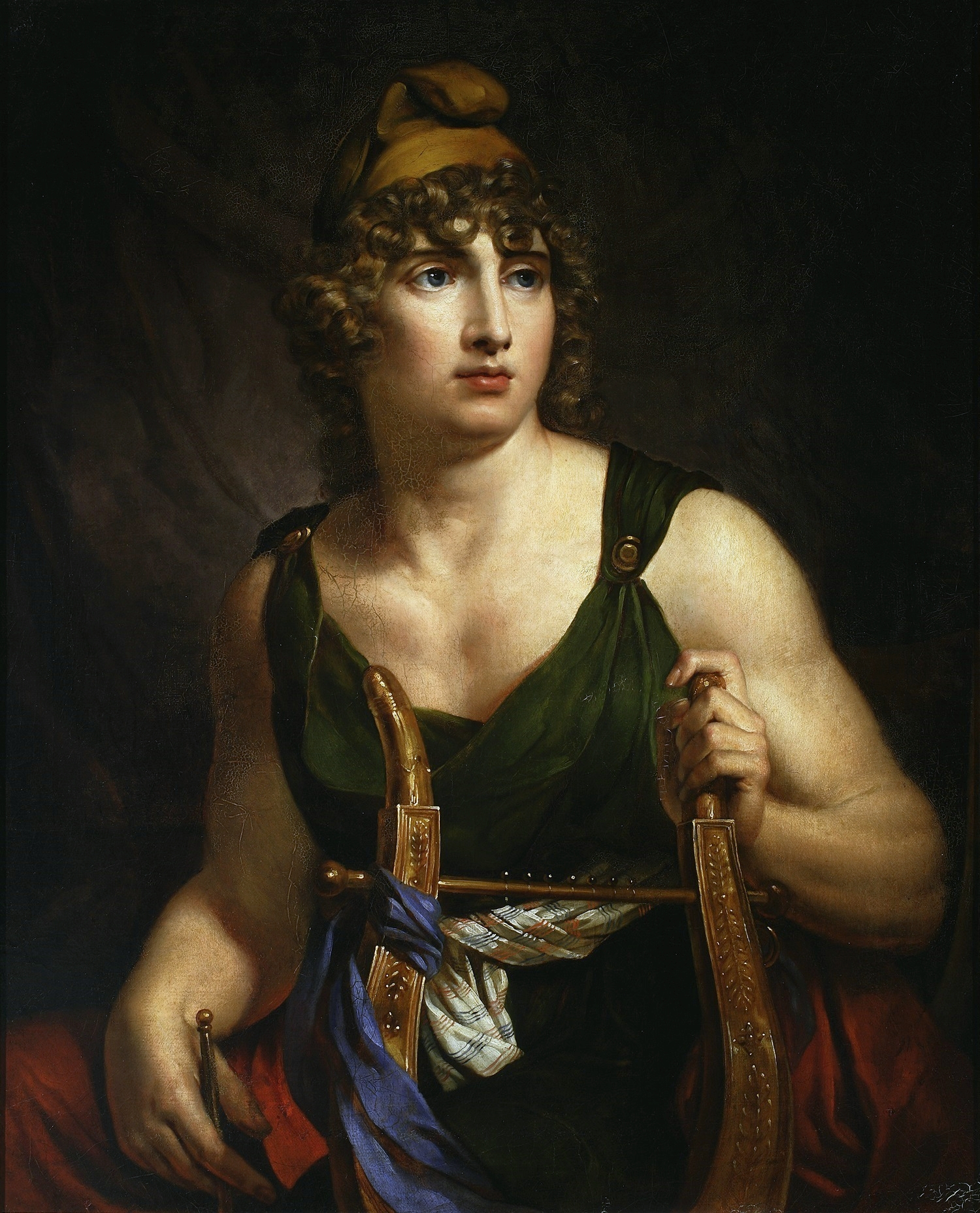
Paris in the Phrygian Cap, 1812

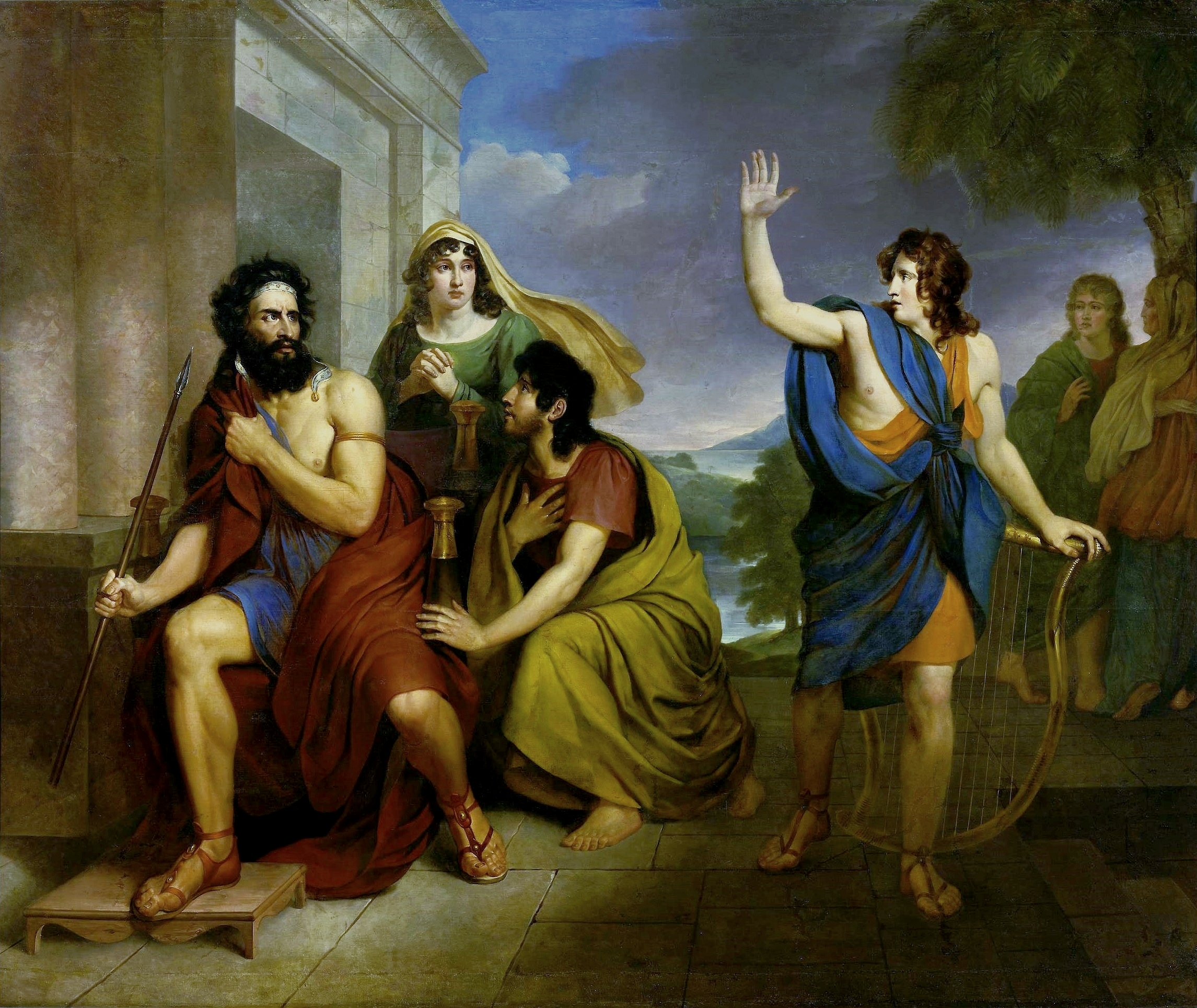
Saul's Anger at David, 1810s

== See also ==
- List of Polish painters
