= Zamch =

- Village
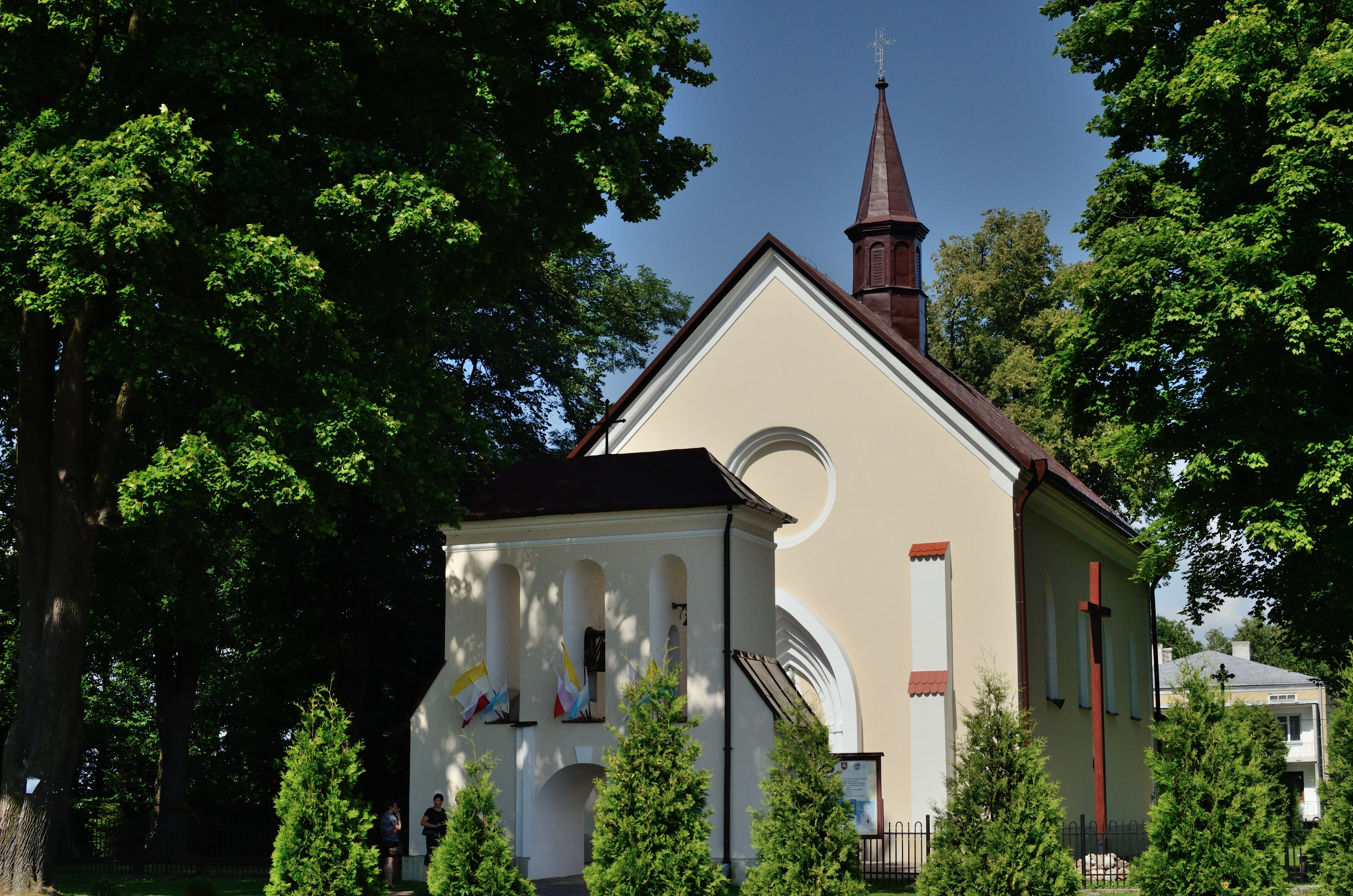
- Saints Josaphat and Praxedes church

- Location within Poland
- Coordinates: 50°18′44″N 23°1′20″E
- Country: Poland
- Voivodeship: Lublin
- County: Biłgoraj
- Gmina: Obsza

Population
  - Total: 1,500
- Time zone: UTC+1 (CET)
  - Summer (DST): UTC+2 (CEST)
- Vehicle registration: LBL

Zamch [zamx] is a village in the administrative district of Gmina Obsza, within Biłgoraj County, Lublin Voivodeship, in south-eastern Poland.

== History ==
Zamch was a starostwo, administered by the Pilecki and Zamoyski noble families. In 1578, in Zamch, Jan Zamoyski received the Polish King Stephen Bathory, and leading Polish Renaissance poet Jan Kochanowski also visited the village.

Following the German-Soviet invasion of Poland, which started World War II in September 1939, the village was occupied by Germany until 1944. On 16 August 1943, the German occupiers and Ukrainian auxiliaries committed a massacre of eight Poles. On 2 March 1945, the Ukrainian Insurgent Army committed a massacre of 15 Poles.

== Notable people ==
- Rafał Hadziewicz (1803–1883), Polish painter
