= Tadeusz Brodowski =

Polish painter

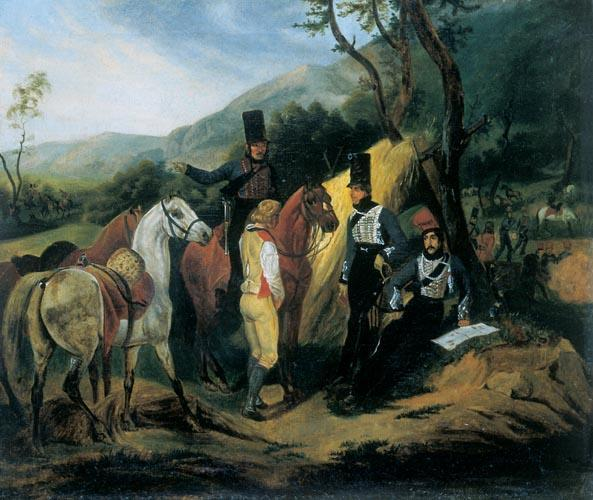
Interrogating a Spy

Tadeusz Brodowski (2 September 1821, Warsaw - 31 March 1848, Paris) was a Polish painter; primarily known for scenes with horses.

== Life and work ==
He was born into a gentrified family with an artistic tradition. His father was the Classical painter, Antoni Brodowski, and he was the older brother of Józef Brodowski, a prominent painter of battle scenes.

His first painting lessons came from his father. After that, he studied in the workshops of Aleksander Kokular and Antoni Blank. In 1841, he went to Rome. Two years later, after mounting an exhibition in Warsaw, he moved to Paris, where he perfected his techniques with the battle painter, Horace Vernet. His works also show the influence of Aleksander Orłowski.

He died, aged only twenty-six, of unspecified causes; although his death came shortly after the beginning of the French Revolution of 1848.

Most of his known paintings involve horses; primarily in battle scenes and historical events. He also did caricatures and a few Orientalist works.

== Source ==
- Feliks Kopera: "Brodowski Tadeusz". In: Polski Słownik Biograficzny. Vol. 2: Beyzym Jan – Brownsford Marja. Kraków: Polska Akademia Umiejętności – Skład Główny w Księgarniach Gebethnera i Wolffa, 1936, pg. 449. Reprint: Zakład Narodowy im. Ossolińskich, Kraków 1989, ISBN 83-04-03291-0
