= Obsza =

- Village
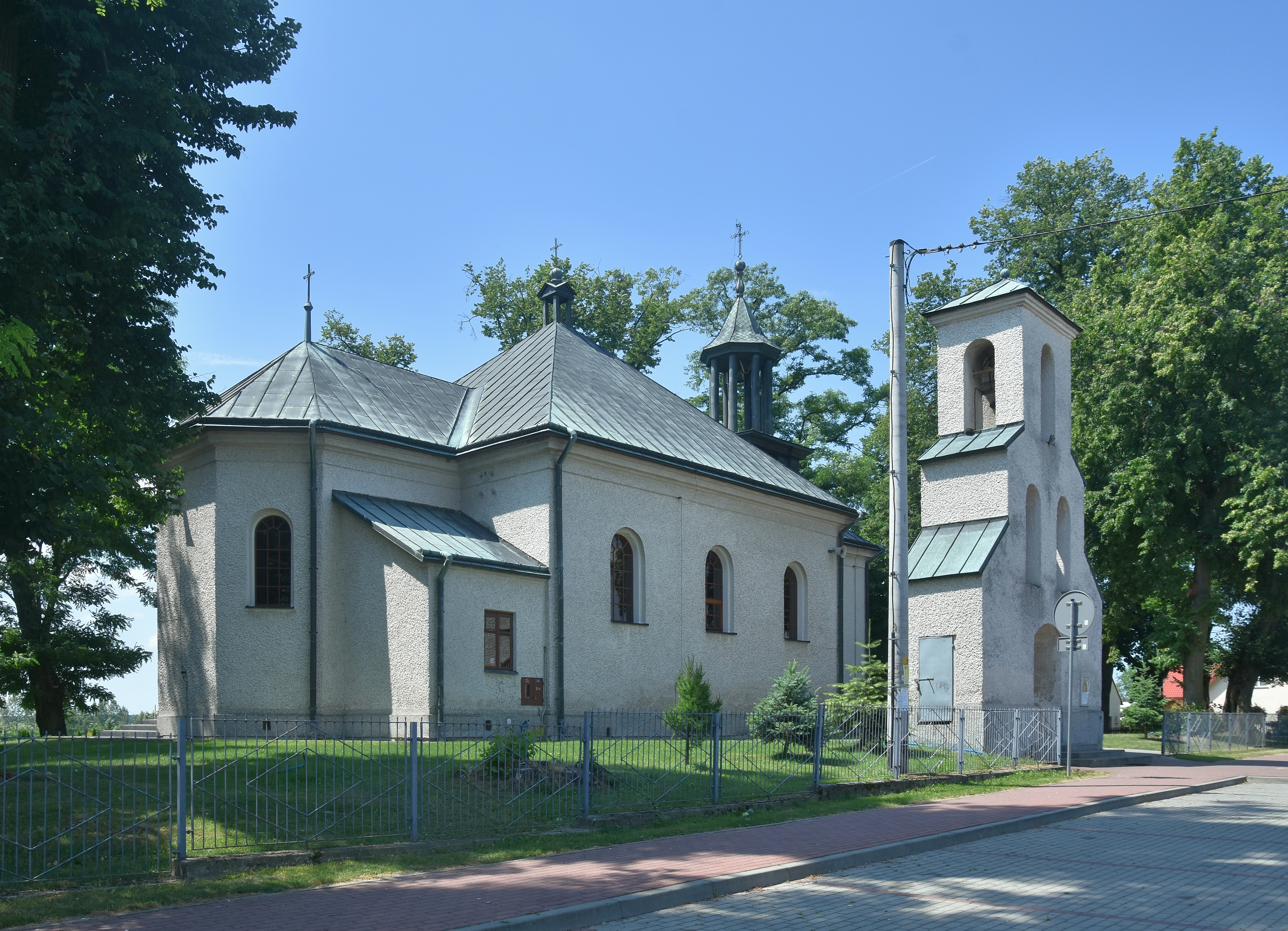
- Church of the Assumption in Obsza

- Location within Poland
- Coordinates: 50°19′N 22°58′E
- Country: Poland
- Voivodeship: Lublin
- County: Biłgoraj
- Gmina: Obsza

Population
  - Total: 861
- Time zone: UTC+1 (CET)
  - Summer (DST): UTC+2 (CEST)

Obsza [ˈɔpʂa] is a village in Biłgoraj County, Lublin Voivodeship, in eastern Poland. It is the seat of the gmina (administrative district) called Gmina Obsza.

== History ==
Five Polish citizens were murdered by Nazi Germany in the village during World War II.
