= Babice, Lublin Voivodeship =

Babice
- Village
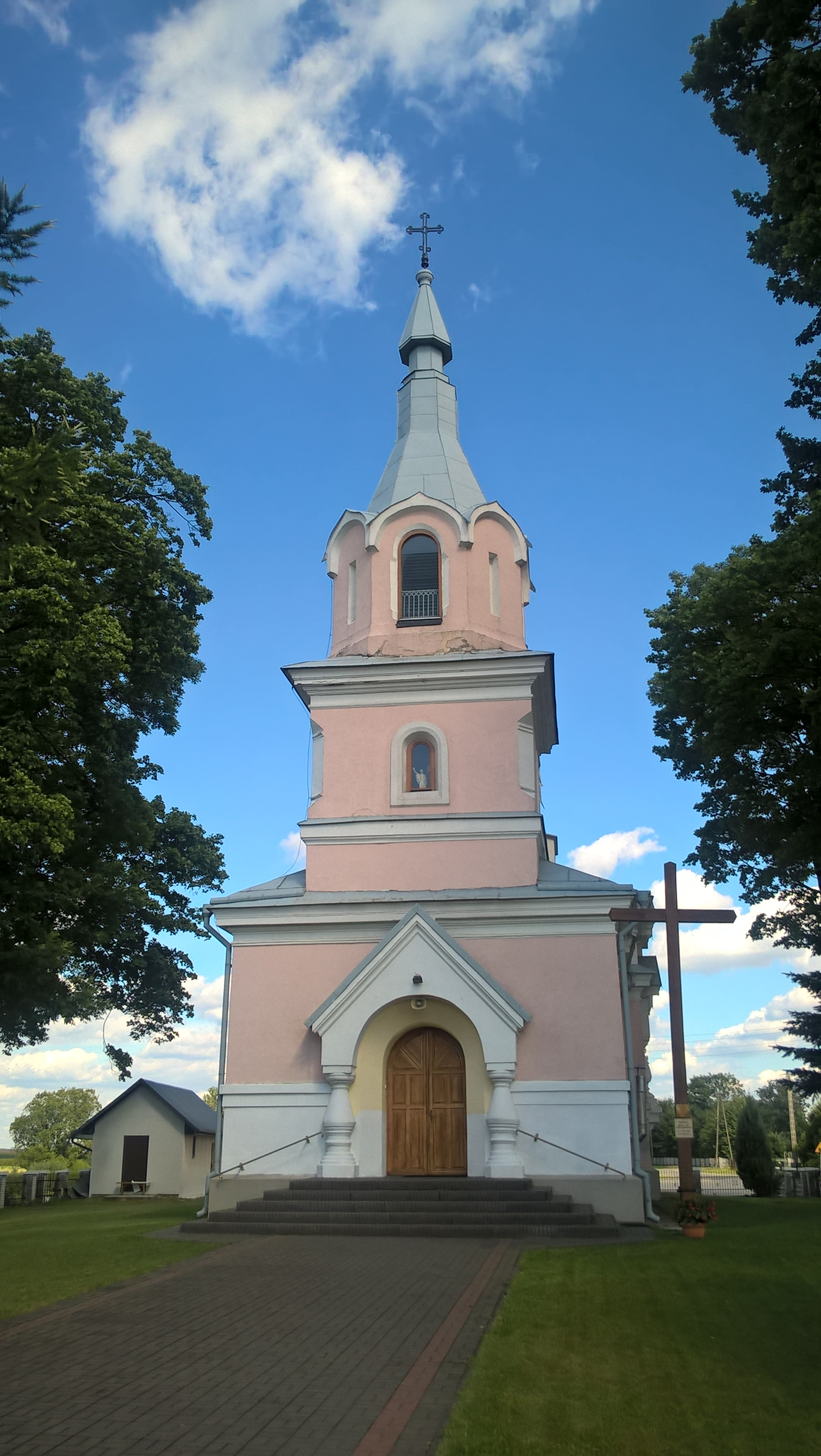
- St. Andrew Bobola church in Babice

- Location within Poland
- Coordinates: 50°20′56″N 22°55′29″E
- Country: Poland
- Voivodeship: Lublin
- County: Biłgoraj
- Gmina: Obsza

Population
  - Total: 966
- Time zone: UTC+1 (CET)
  - Summer (DST): UTC+2 (CEST)

Babice [baˈbʲit͡sɛ] is a village in the administrative district of Gmina Obsza, within Biłgoraj County, Lublin Voivodeship, in eastern Poland.

== History ==
16 people, including nine Polish citizens, were murdered by Nazi Germany in the village during World War II.
