= Władysław Czachórski =

Polish painter (1850–1911)

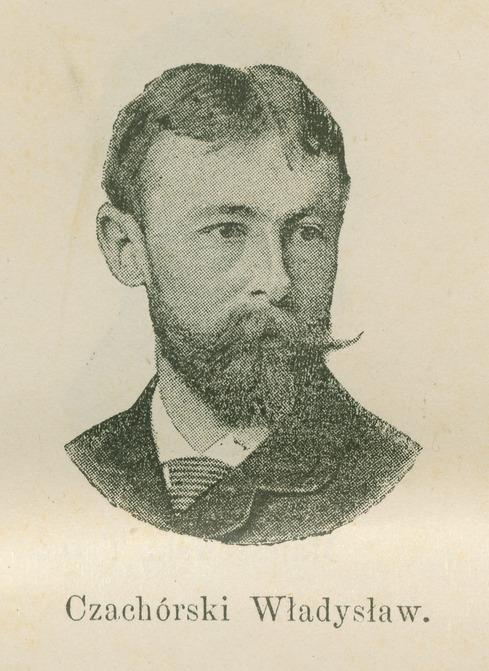
Drawing of Czachórski Władysław, 1890

Władysław Czachórski (22 September 1850 – 13 January 1911) was a Polish painter in the Academic style.

== Biography ==
Czachorski was born in Lublin. In 1866 he attended the School of Fine Arts in Warsaw and had Rafał Hadziewicz as a teacher. He then spent one year at the Dresden Academy, and from there he went to the Munich Academy (1869–1873) others who studied there at the same time included: Hermann Anschütz, Karl von Piloty, and Alexander Wagner. He received Magna Cum Laude (the Grand Silver Medal) from Munich, and proceeded to travel to France, Italy and Poland after his graduation. He held membership of the Berlin Academy and was also organizer and judge of international exhibitions, even though he had his home in Munich. He was awarded the Order of St. Michael in 1893. In addition, he had many art exhibitions in Poland, taking place in Kraków, Warsaw and Łódź. He also exhibited in Lemberg, the capital of Austrian Galicia. After his death in Munich in 1911, a posthumous exhibition was held at the Warsaw "Zachęta" Society of Fine Arts.

Among Czachorski's noted works were still lifes, painted portraits, and Shakespearean scenes. Of these, Juliet's Funeral (1873), Hamlet (1873), and, most notably, Hamlet Receiving the Players (1875), were widely recognized as his greatest works.

"The hallmark of Czachorski's style, however, and the basis of his fame, are his images of beautiful young women in rich interiors, painted with great realism. He has long been regarded a master of rendering fabrics, jewelry and other details to create the atmosphere of luxury and elegance."

His paintings can be found in all the more famous and larger museums in Poland. His works also make appearances in private collections in many countries including: Germany (Bremen), England and the United States. They can also be found in foreign museums such as the Borys Voznytsky National Art Gallery in Lviv (Ukraine) and the Museo Nacional de San Carlos in Mexico City.

== Selected paintings ==
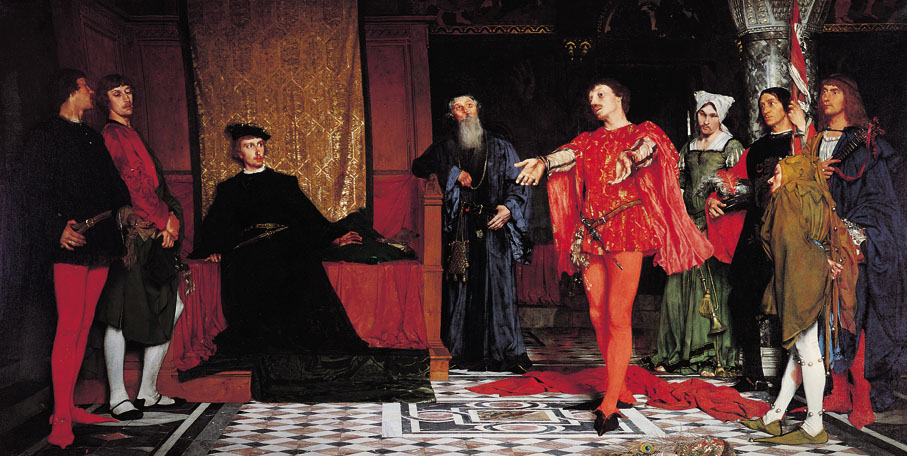
Hamlet Receiving the Players (1875)
National Museum, Warsaw

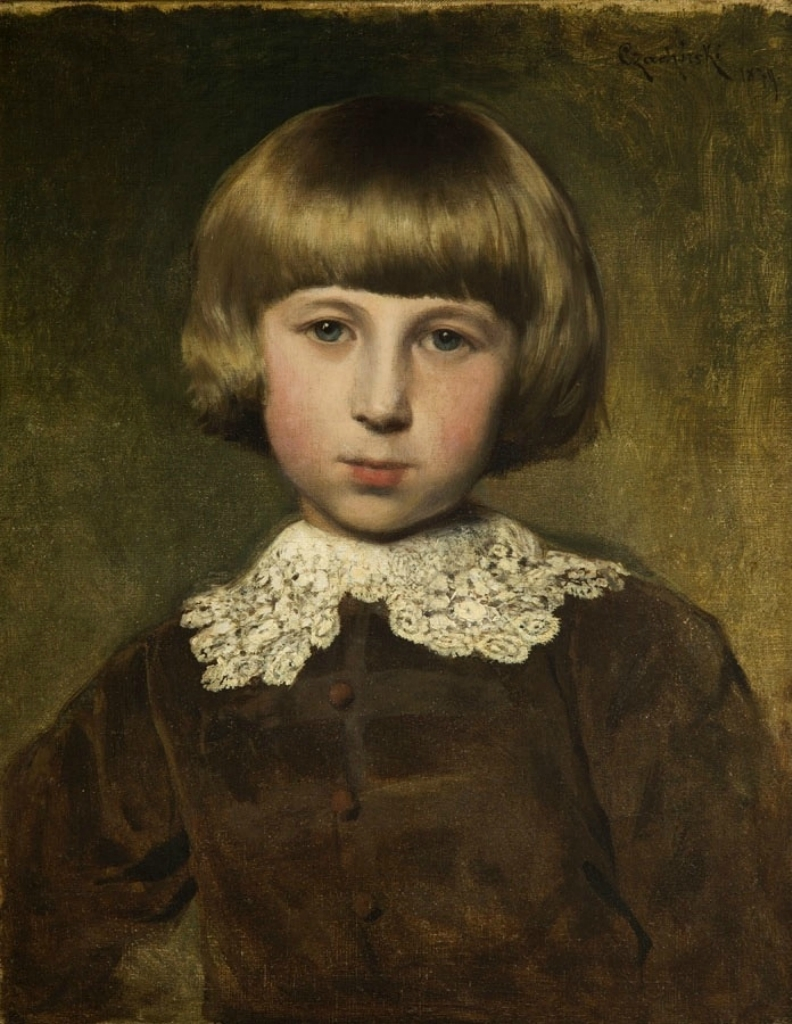
Portrait of Władek - son of painter Władysław Szerner, 1879

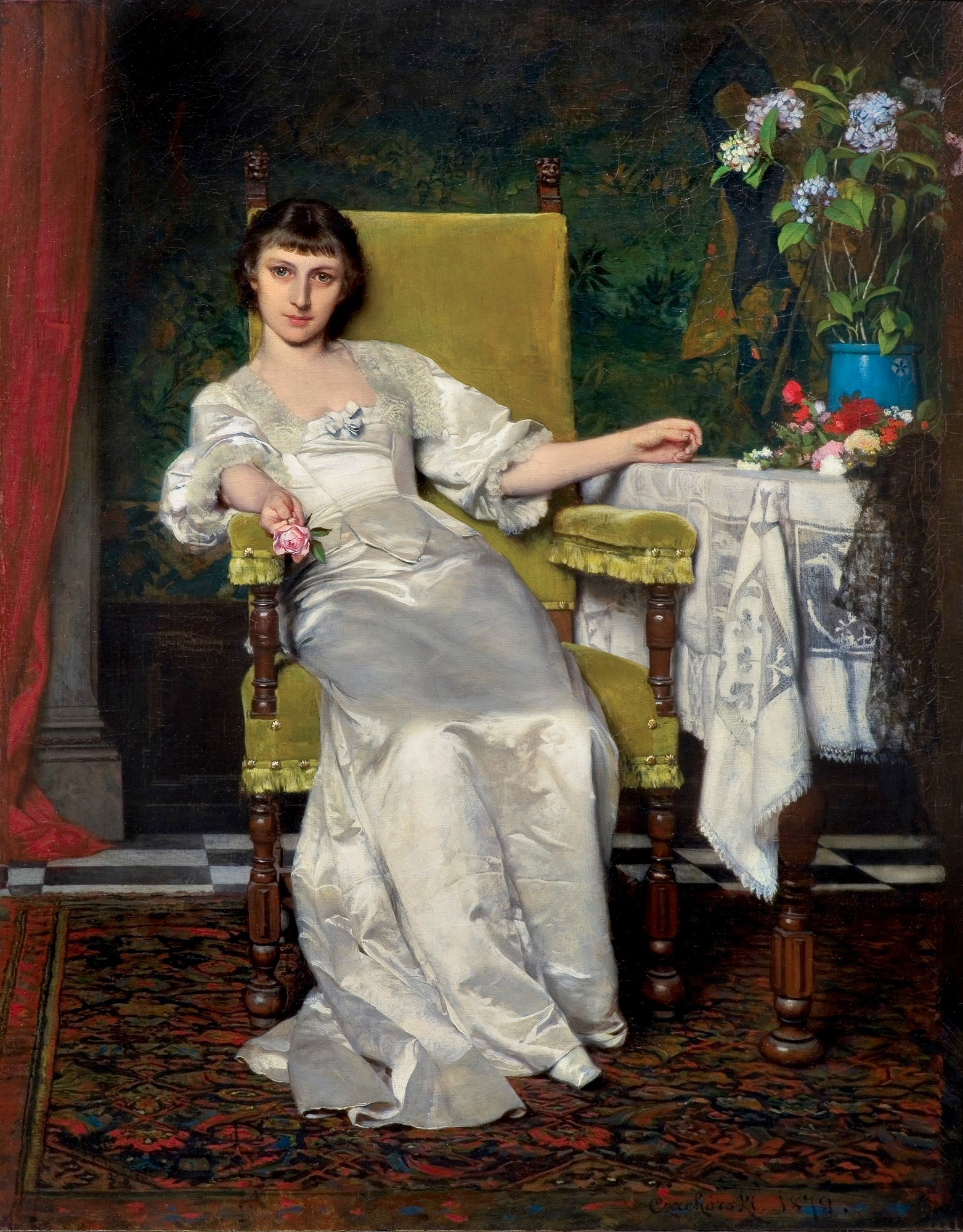
A lady with rose, 1879

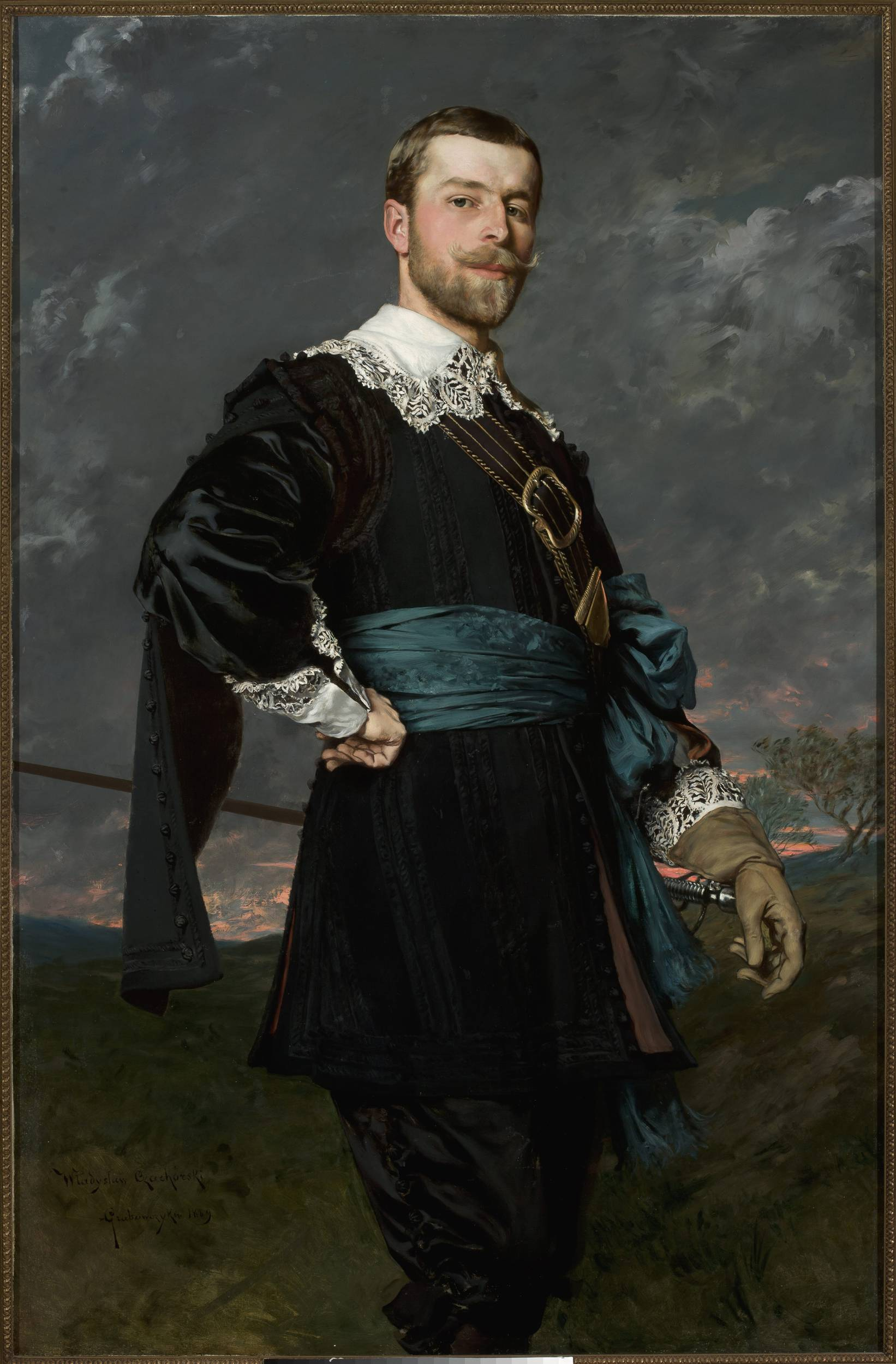
Stanisław Czachórski, 1886

Confidants, 1887

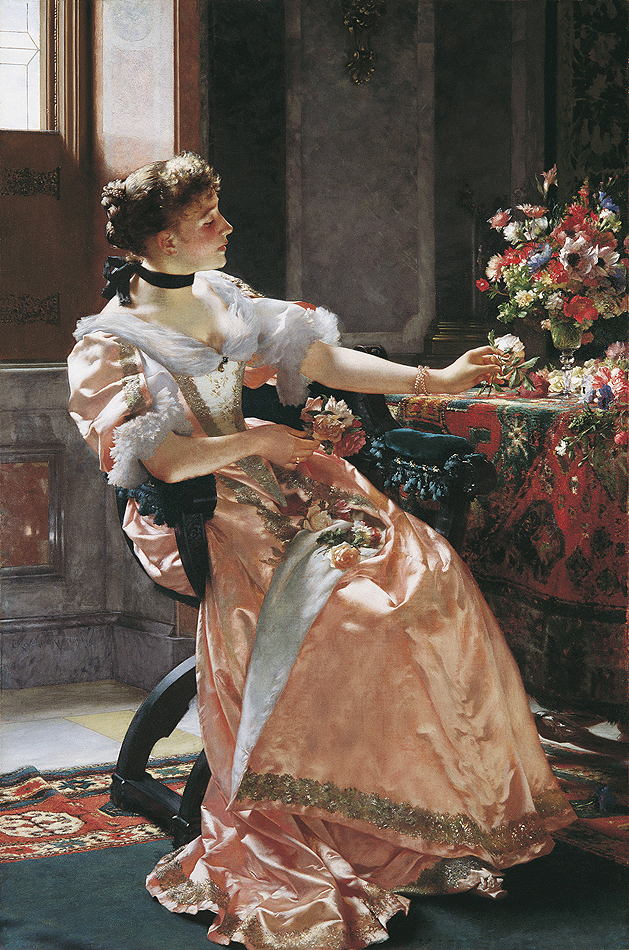
First roses, 1891

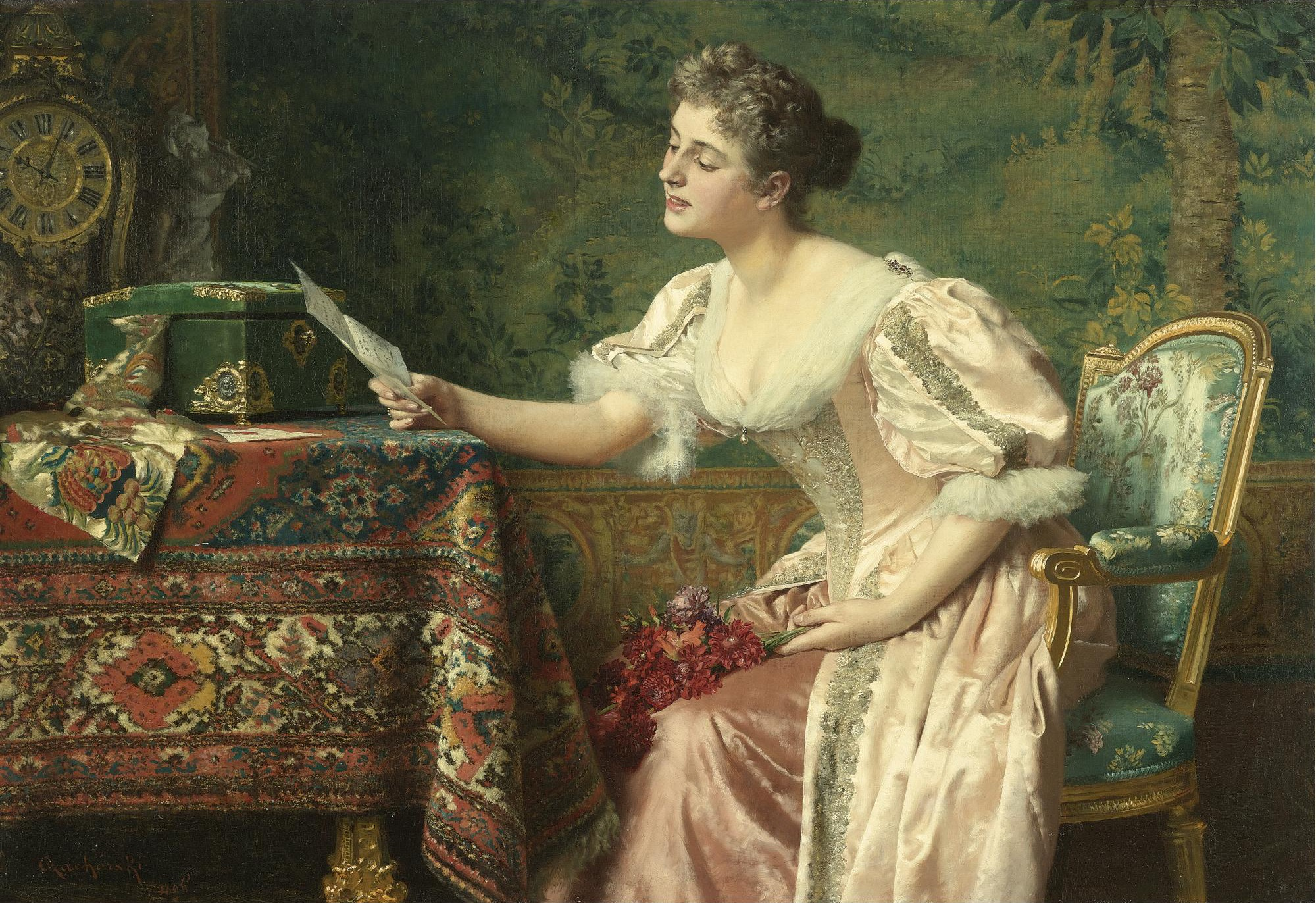
The Letter, 1896

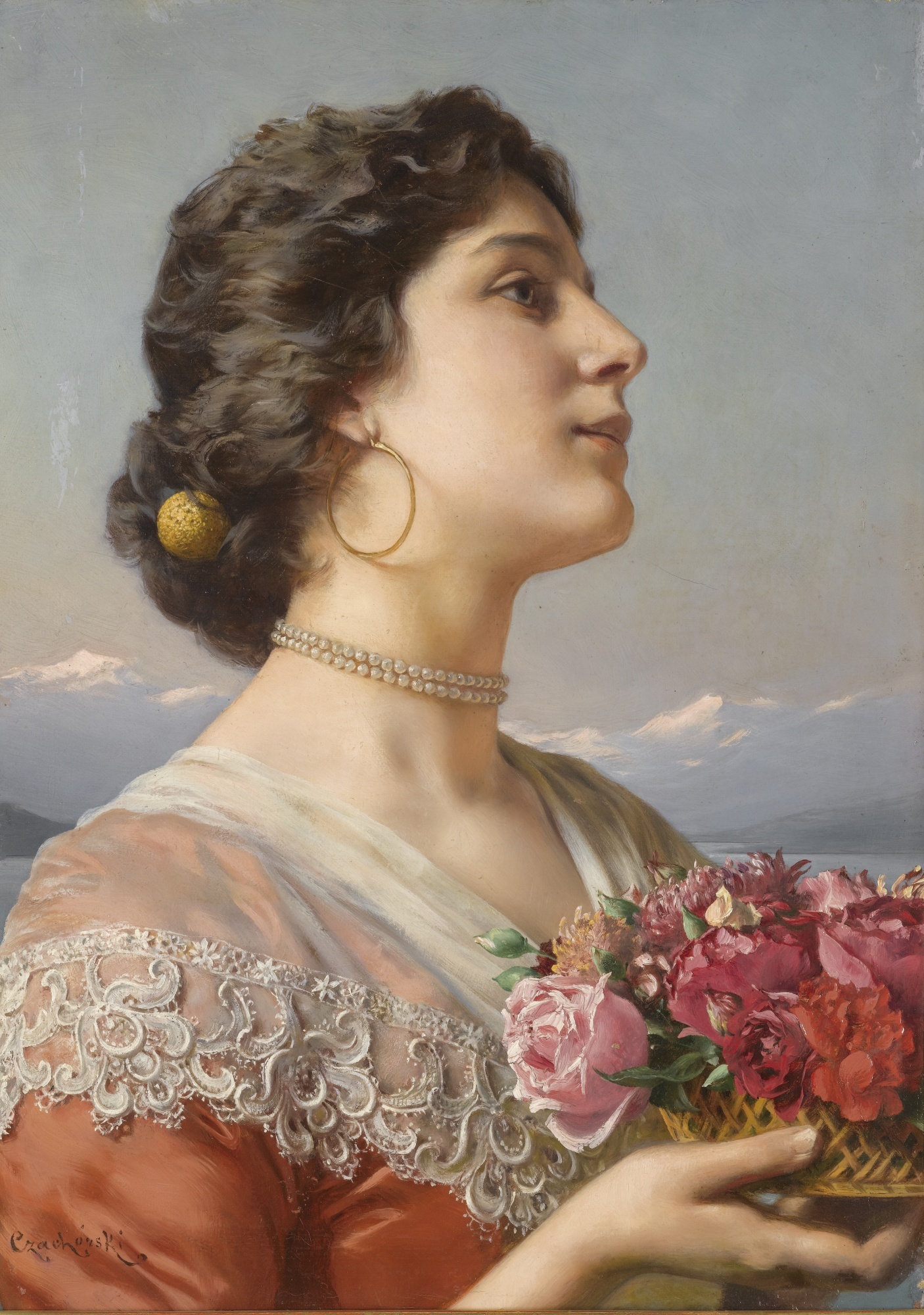
A bouquet, 1900s

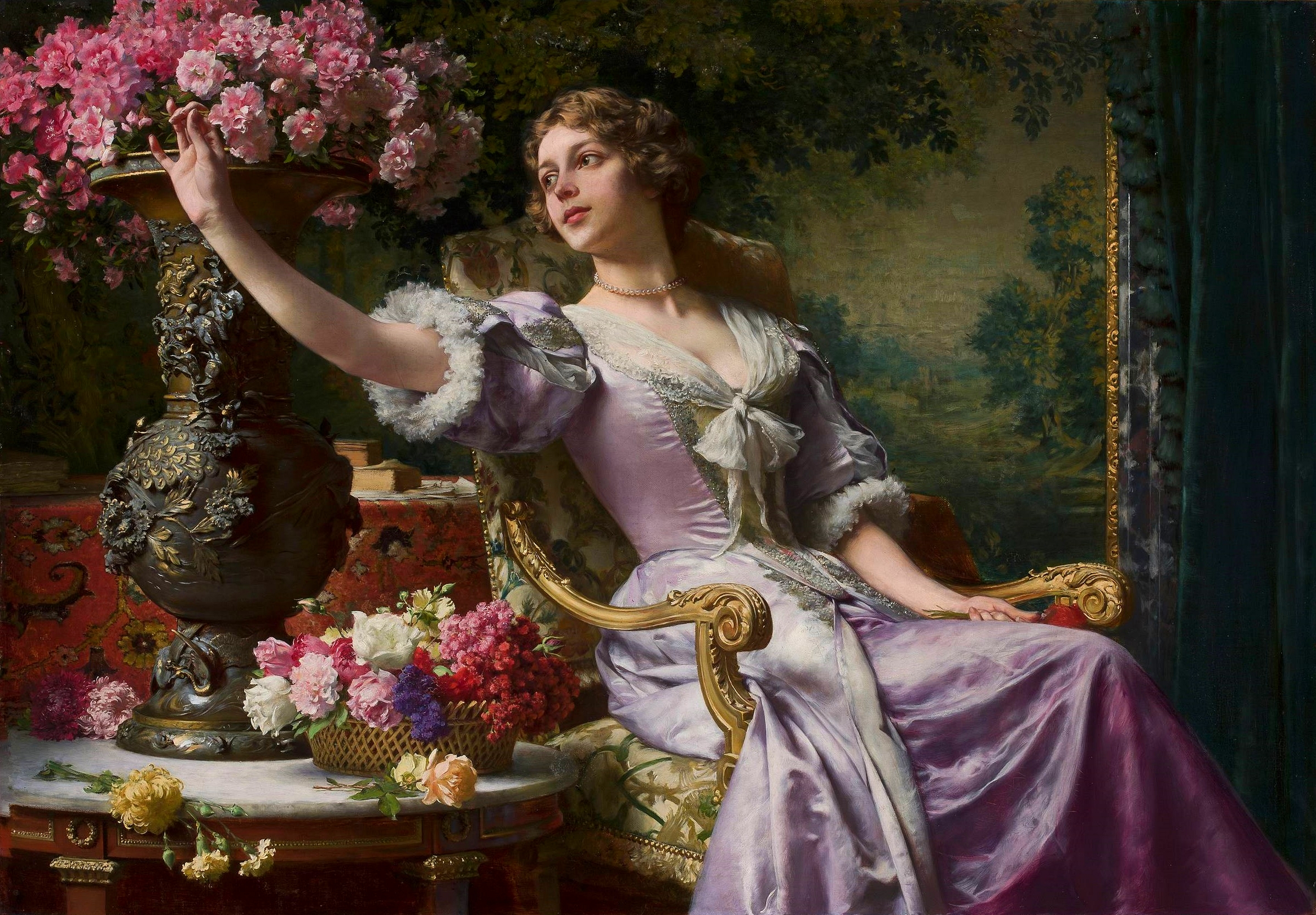
A lady in a lilac dress with flowers, 1903,
National Museum, Warsaw

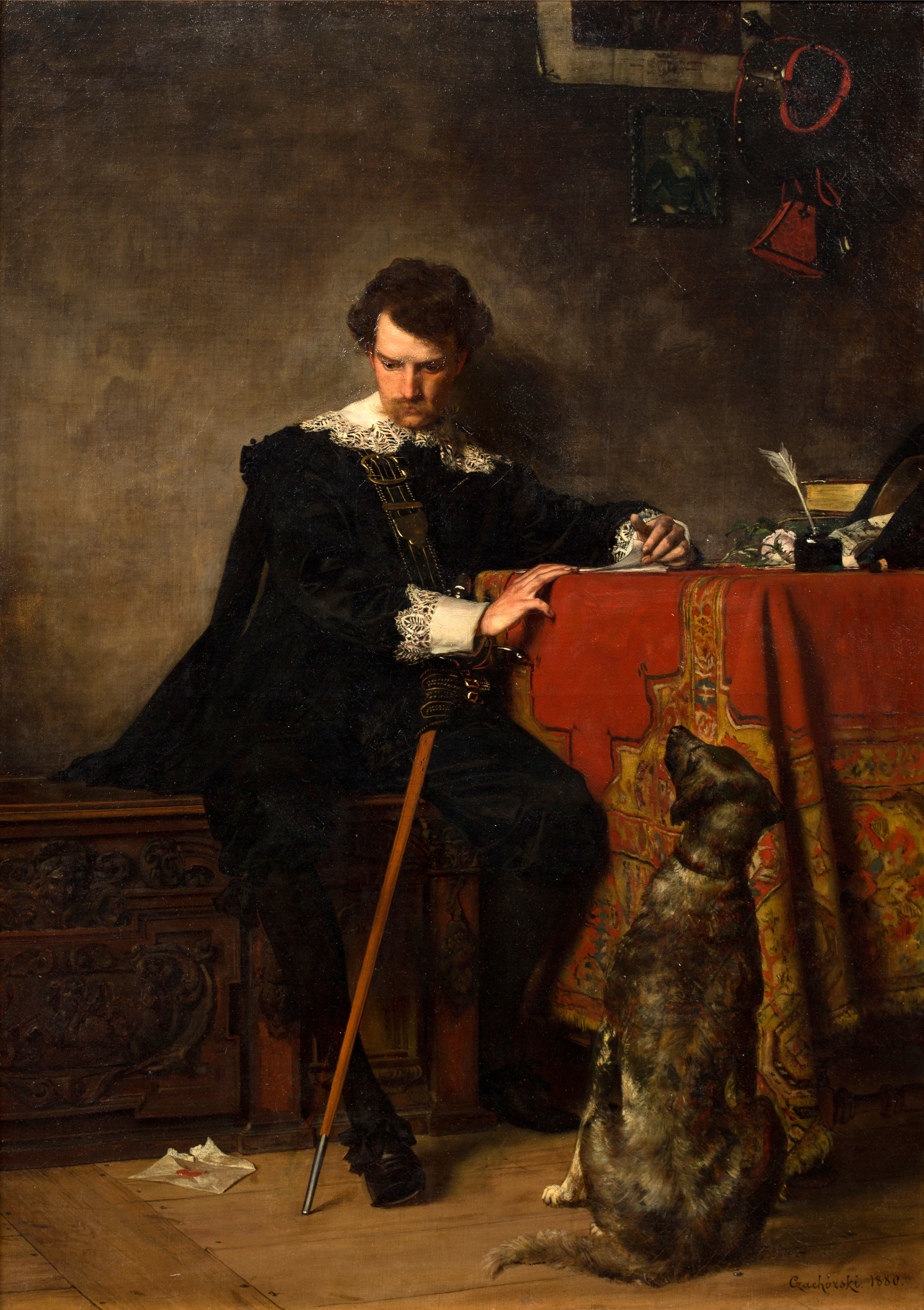
List miłosny, 1880
