= Wola Obszańska =

- Village
- Location within Poland
- Coordinates: 50°19′N 22°55′E
- Country: Poland
- Voivodeship: Lublin
- County: Biłgoraj
- Gmina: Obsza

Population
  - Total: 617

Wola Obszańska [ˈvɔla ɔpˈʂaɲska] is a village in the administrative district of Gmina Obsza, within Biłgoraj County, Lublin Voivodeship, in eastern Poland.
