= Olchowiec, Biłgoraj County =

Olchowiec
- Village
- Location within Poland
- Coordinates: 50°20′41″N 22°59′1″E
- Country: Poland
- Voivodeship: Lublin
- County: Biłgoraj
- Gmina: Obsza

Population
  - Total: 461

Olchowiec [ɔlˈxɔvʲɛt͡s] is a village in the administrative district of Gmina Obsza, within Biłgoraj County, Lublin Voivodeship, in eastern Poland.
