= Rafał Hadziewicz =

Polish artist (1803–1883)

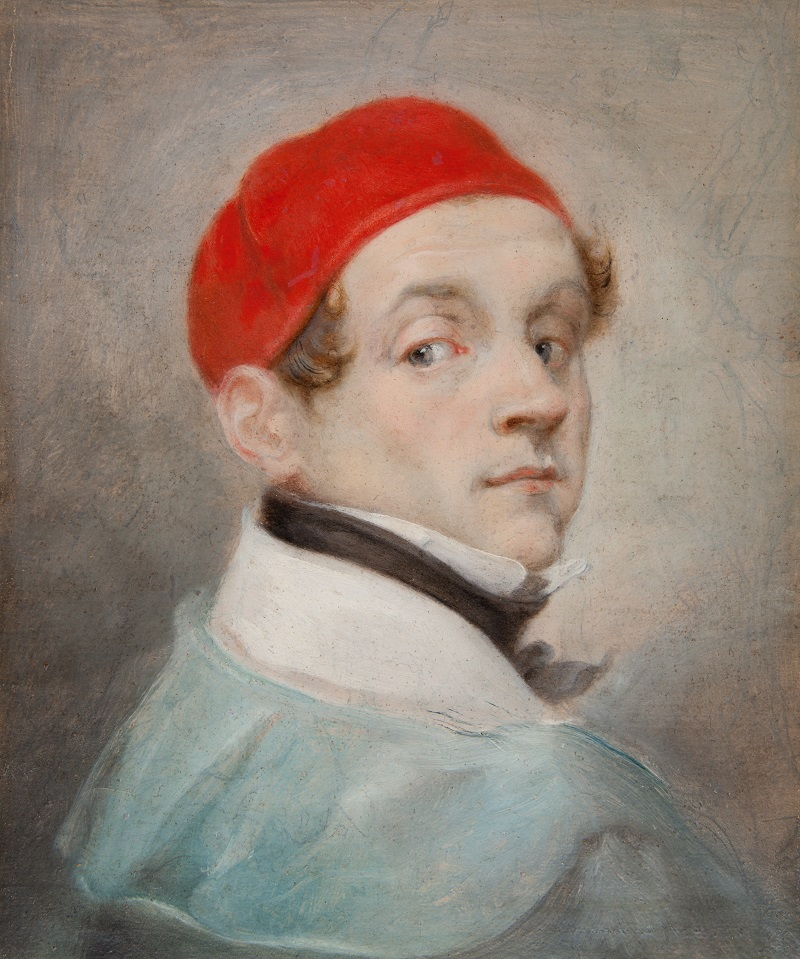
Self-portrait in Red Cap

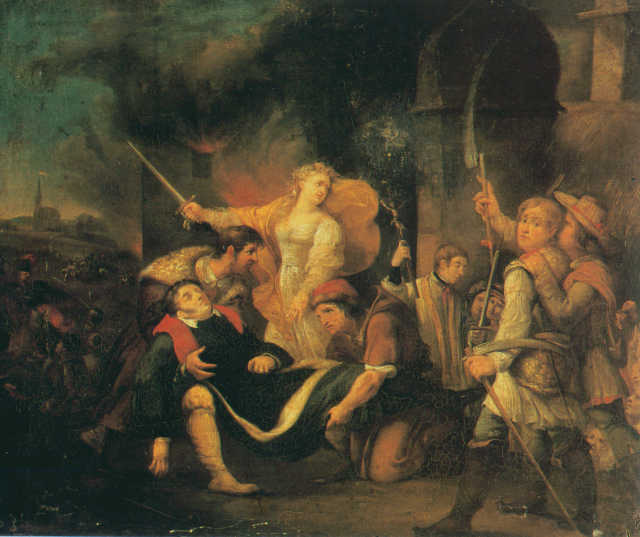
The Death of Henryk Ignacy Kamieński

Rafał Hadziewicz (13 October 1803 – 7 September 1883) was a Polish painter; primarily of portraits and religious works, and an expert on ancient culture.

== Biography ==
He was born in Zamch. From 1816 to 1822, he attended the Royal Lyceum (formerly the Zamojski Academy) in Szczebrzeszyn. He then enrolled at the Faculty of Fine Arts at the University of Warsaw, where he studied with Antoni Brodowski and Antoni Blank. After receiving a scholarship from the "Ministry of Public Education and Religious Affairs" in 1829, he spent a short time in Dresden, then went to Paris, where he studied at the École des Beaux-Arts under Antoine-Jean Gros. In 1833, he found a position in the studios of Bertel Thorvaldsen in Rome. While there, he visited all the museums, making copies of the Old Masters, especially Raphael.

In 1834, he moved to Kraków, where he painted religious murals. He was married there the following year. Later, he created murals at churches in Medyka and Starzawa. He stayed in Kraków until 1839.

In 1839, he moved to Moscow and served as a Professor of Drawing for the Faculty of Mathematics at the University of Moscow; a position he held until 1844. He then went to Warsaw where he became a Professor at the School of Fine Arts in 1846. He held that position until 1864 and taught a generation of young Polish artists; including Władysław Czachórski, Józef Brodowski, Franciszek Kostrzewski, Pantaleon Szyndler and Alfred Kowalski. He remained in Warsaw until 1871, then retired to Kielce, where he died in 1883.

He was one of the co-founders of the Towarzystwo Zachęty do Sztuk Pięknych, an art appreciation society that later established the museum known as the Zachęta. His religious paintings may be found at churches in Szczebrzeszyn, Lisów and Łęczyca.

== Sources ==
- Biographical notes @ the Szczebrzeszyn website
- Biographical notes @ Pinakoteka
