= Marcin Samlicki =

Polish painter (1878–1945)

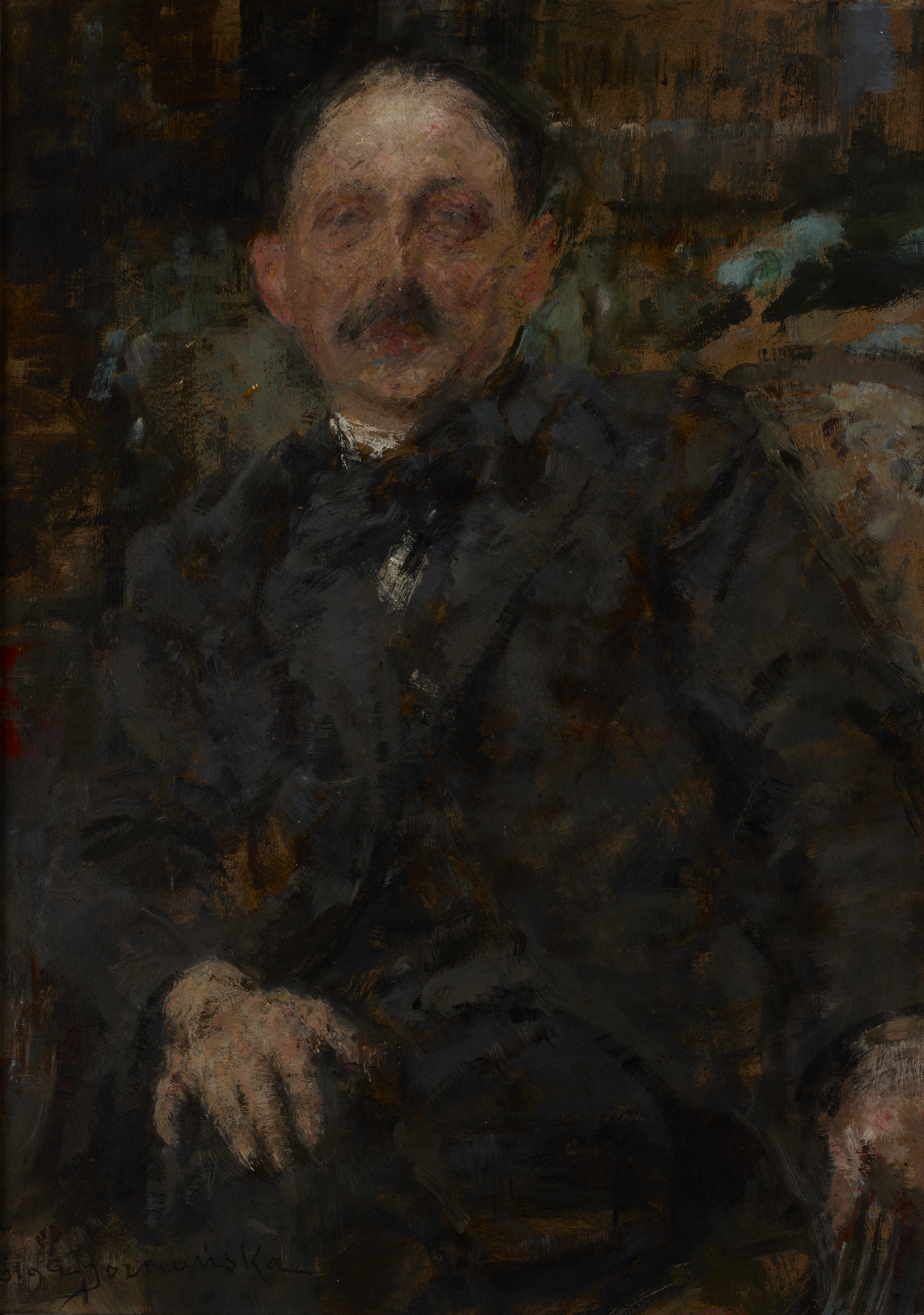
- Portrait by Olga Boznańska
- Born: October 23, 1878; Bochnia, Poland
- Died: June 25, 1945 (aged 66); Bochnia, Poland
- Occupation: Painter

Marcin Samlicki (October 23, 1878 – June 25, 1945) was a Polish painter and art critic. An obelisk was installed in his memory in his hometown of Bochnia in 2005.

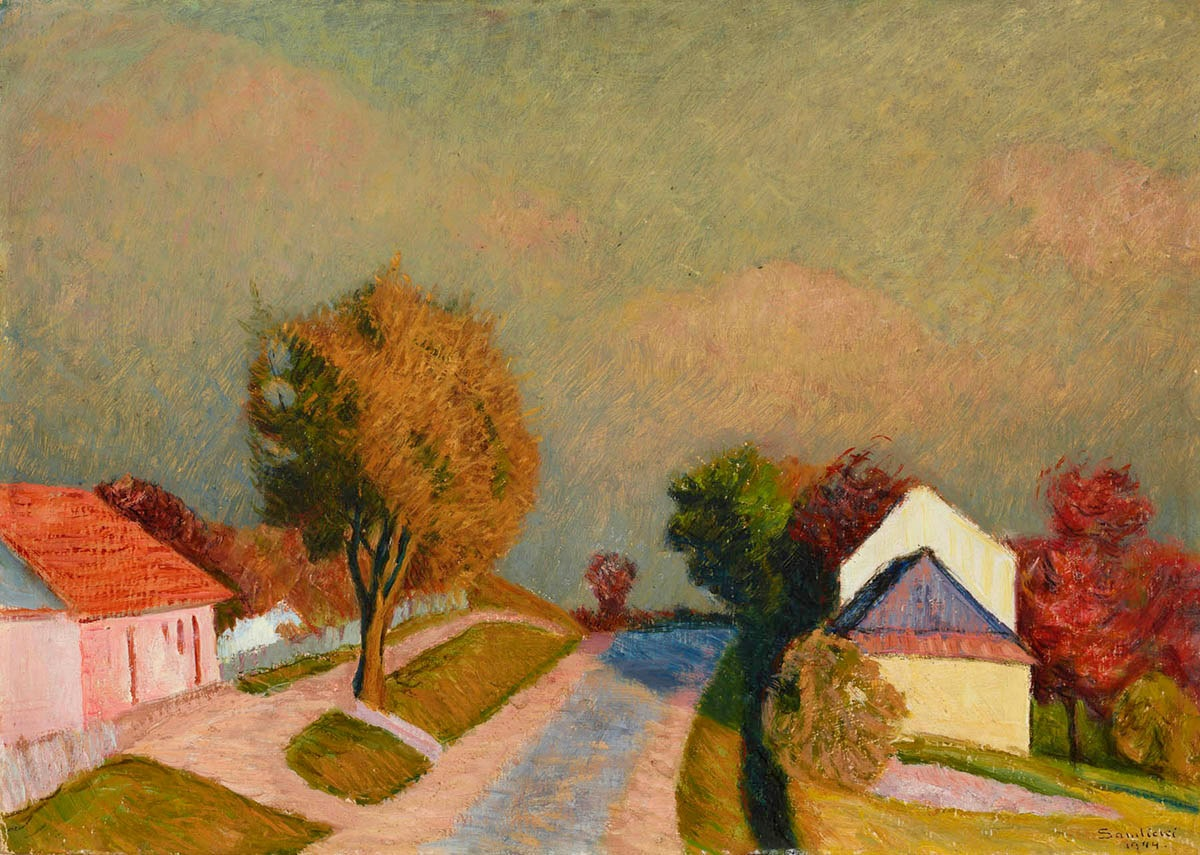
Autumn trees, 1944
