= Jadwiga Długoborska =

Polish educator, social worker, and resistance member (1899–1944)

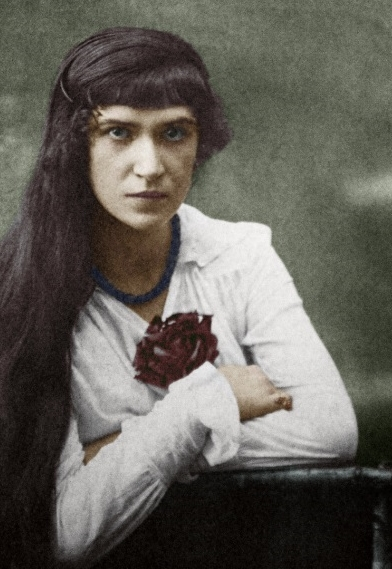
- Born: Jadwiga Wagner; 27 July 1899; Ostrów Mazowiecka, Poland
- Died: 29 June 1944 (aged 44); Guty-Bujno, Poland
- Cause of death: murdered by Gestapo
- Known for: helping Jews during World War II
- Spouse: Bolesław Długoborski
- Parent(s): Aleksander Wagner; Karolina Leszczyńska

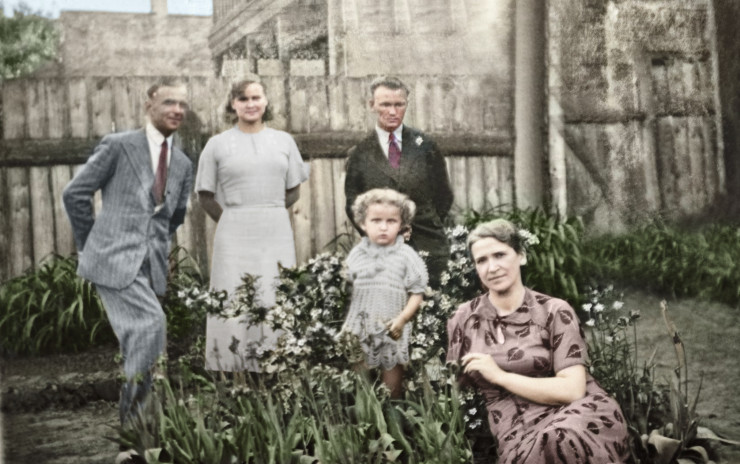
J. Długoborska (sitting) with her sister Wanda Wujcik, 1935

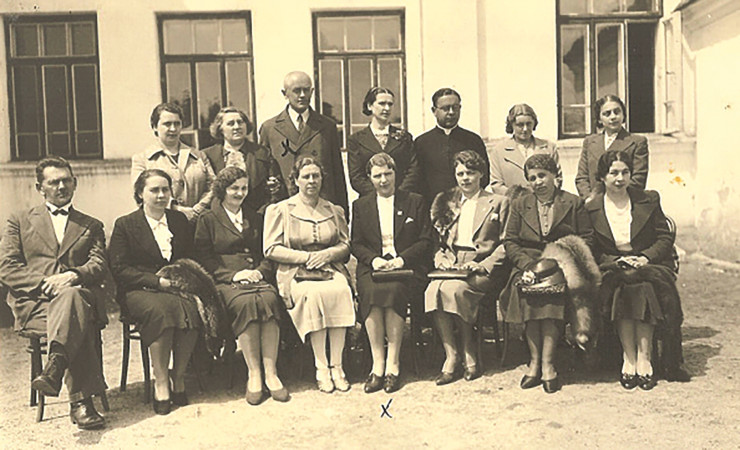
Committee for Child Nutrition (top row, center: Jadwiga Długoborska)

Jadwiga Długoborska (née Wagner; 27 July 1899 – 29 June 1944) was a Polish teacher, social and charity worker, and member of the underground Polish independence movement during the World War II, persecuted and murdered for lending aid to Jews.

== Life ==
Jadwiga Długoborska was born to Aleksander Wagner and Karolina née Leszczyńska. She has graduated from private girls’ school in Siedlce prior to the outbreak of the World War I. In 1919, she married Bolesław Długoborski, an administrator of the estate in Oblęgorek, and started work as a teacher at elementary school in Ostrów Mazowiecka. She became actively involved in charity campaigns including the local Committee for Child Nutrition.

=== The occupation – aiding Jews ===
The Wagner family had been letting apartments to Polish and Jewish tenants. Both the family home and the boarding house which Długoborska managed, were located just several hundred meters from the prison being run by the German gendarmerie and Gestapo on Jatkowa Street (currently Pocztowa Street).

After the outbreak of the World War II, Długoborska helped to take care of wounded soldiers at the hospital. The town was bombarded prior to the arrival of the German forces. Soon, the occupiers began oppressing and murdering the civilian population. The violence escalated on 11 November 1939, when the 91st SS Police Regiment subordinate to the Einsatzgruppe z.b.V. arrived from Warsaw and murdered the town's entire Jewish community under the command of Hans Hoffmann, Theodor Pilich, and Kurt Kirschner. It was the first mass extermination of Jews in the General Government, deliberately carried out on a national Polish holiday: 11 November. According to official German numbers, 364 men, women, and children were killed that day. The Poles maintained that the number of victims was significantly higher. The Germans had carried out provocations ahead of the execution by setting fire to the town center and then spreading rumors that the guilty party was the Jews who had no intention of leaving their possessions in the hands of Poles. The Nazis had used the 1939 register of permanent residents in which the Jews’ precise addresses were recorded in order to gather them outside the town hall and in the courtyard of the middle school.

On 9 or 10 November 1939, Jadwiga Długoborska, her mother and most likely her sister Wanda Wujcik, concealed 10 Jewish tenants in hidden rooms upstairs, for they knew that their home was present on the Germans’ list. Those tenants were the Ryczke, Rekant, Lewartowicz, and Szumowicz families, who survived the day of the extermination and left town the following day, crossing the border into the USSR. They sent a postcard from Białystok that they were still alive. After that first successful attempt to help Jews, Jadwiga Długoborska tried again, hiding a Jewish family with two children in the fall of 1940.

Jadwiga Długoborska was aided by one of her tenants, Ludwik Tomaszewski pseud. “Cis”, an employee at the German magistracy and member of the Ostrów Mazowiecka District division of the Home Army (code name “Opocznik” [“Flycatcher”]). Following a denunciation from a caretaker working at the magistracy, Tomaszewski and 14 Polish clerks were arrested by the Gestapo on 20 March 1943 and taken to Pawiak prison. He died in the mass execution of a group of 280 men in Warsaw. He did not expose Jadwiga during the investigation. A death sentence was carried out on the informer by “Opocznik” Home Army soldiers.

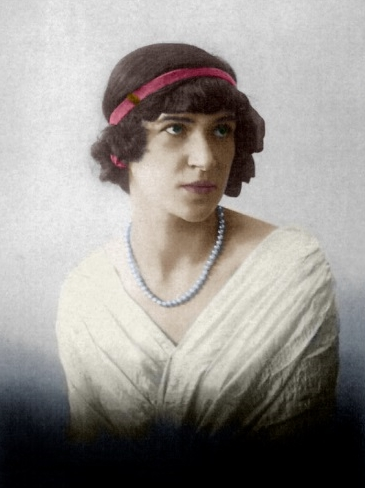

=== Activity in the Home Army “Opocznik” division and cooperation with the local magistracy ===
Długoborska was actively engaged in the underground independence movement and cooperated closely with the Home Army “Opocznik” division. She gave shelter to Home Army officers, among whom were Władysław Reda pseud. “Jeliński”, Maj. Eugeniusz Mieszkowski pseud. “Ostry”, Maj. Henryk Antoni Pracki pseud. “Rola”, the district's radio officer Lt Edward Nowicki pseud. “Tyczka”, and the commander of the Brok station Lt Henryk Dubois pseud. “Ryszard”.

Due to her maiden name, the occupying authorities proposed on several occasions that she sign the Volksliste, but she refused. She was forced to undergo daily inspections. She had to report to the Gestapo headquarters every day at 6 a.m. and present her boarding house's list of tenants. Many of them were not registered and took advantage of the numerous nooks and crannies in the basements of several interconnected multistory houses up for rent. The Gestapo carried out searches in the boarding house and tormented its tenants with their intrusions.

Jadwiga Długoborska visited her family in Warsaw on several occasions. In January 1943, she gave shelter to Emil G., a refugee from Warsaw who carried a Kennkarte with a Polish surname beginning with the letter Ż. She took him in and he lived openly with the other tenants, working as a foreman at the local sawmill. The rest of the tenants were fully aware of the refugee's Jewish origins.

Two months before the Germans withdrew from the town, the chambermaid Marianna M. was fired from her work for stealing. In revenge, she went to the Gestapo and denounced Długoborska and her own husband, from whom she was separated, as well as his whole family. The secret police entered the boarding house on the night of 23 June 1944 and arrested Jadwiga Długoborska and her sister Cecylia Pachecka, the mother of adolescent children and widow of Cpt. Pachecka who had been killed in the 1939 defensive war, on charges of having hidden Jews and Home Army officers. The informer's husband and brother-in-law were murdered on the morning of 24 June and the remaining family members were brought to the Gestapo headquarters and released several weeks later.

=== To the rescue ===
Długoborska and Pachecka were interned in a prison which the residents of Ostrów called Czerwoniak [Red building] due to the color of its façade. The day after the arrest, Wanda Wujcik, Długoborska's sister and the wife of Lt Władysław Wujcik, who was being held in the II-C Woldenburg POW camp, arrived from Warsaw. She had been informed by Emil Ż. Wujcik took immediate steps to free her sisters. She went to Dr. Leon Surowski, a member of the Home Army who advised her to give the imprisoned Cecylia Pachecka a hot herbal tea made from tobacco. Wanda delivered the tea and Pachecka drank it and was quickly stricken by a high fever and acute stomach pains. Dr. Leon Surowski was summoned to the prison and gave a false diagnosis in the presence of the Gestapo, claiming that the prisoner was suffering from typhus. Cecylia was taken to an infections hospital in a prison ambulance, accompanied by a Polish doctor.

The last time Wanda Wujcik saw Długoborska was in prison on 26 June, when she gave her a package of food. She received a message the next day that her sister had been taken to the Gestapo headquarters. The Gestapo officer "Cyk" personally tormented her. "Cyk" shot 10 prisoners in the forest near the village of Guty-Bujno on 29 June 1944, including Jadwiga Długoborska, Cecylia Warchalska (née Kasińska, the wife of middle school professor Kazimierz Warchalski who was murdered in the Majdanek concentration camp for holding classes in secret) and Władysław Nejman, a resident of Ostrów and lessee of the town's pond. The names of the remaining victims have never been discovered.

=== The fate of the informer ===
The chambermaid was arrested and shot by the Gestapo on 16 July 1944 on charges of withholding knowledge and not informing about the concealment of Jews quickly enough. Her body was found by chance by her husband's family after the Germans had withdrawn from the town. She was buried in a nameless grave in the town's cemetery.

=== Długoborska’s funeral ===
Wanda Wujcik began the search for her murdered sister's body on 29 August 1944, one day after the Germans had withdrawn from the town. It took two weeks for her to find the place where the body lay. The exhumation of Długoborska's body revealed the injuries that had been dealt: one eye ruined, fingernails missing from both hands, multiple abrasions on the arms and legs, back blackened with blood.

Długoborska was buried on 13 September 1944 in the first funeral following the Germans' withdrawal, drawing crowds of Ostrów Mazowiecka residents. Her coffin was covered with flowers. She was laid to rest in the parish cemetery, buried in her family grave onto which the inscription "She died a martyr's death" was engraved.

== The fate of the survivor ==
Emil Ż. survived the German occupation. He joined the UB, and from 27 February 1945 served in Ostrów Mazowiecka and then in Sierpc and Wrocław. He was discharged from service as being "unsuitable to work." Using his pre-war surname, he left Poland illegally with a group of Jews from the Ihud party and spent several months outside the country, including in Vienna, where he met his brother-in-law Naftal Grabowski, and in Salzburg, where he contacted his cousins Janina and Pola Szwecer. He reported to the Polish Military Mission stationed in Stuttgart at the beginning of February and expressed his willingness to return to Poland as an émigré. He returned to Wrocław on 28 February 1947 and was arrested by the UB on 8 March 1947 and accused of having crossed the border illegally and cooperating with foreign intelligence. He was detained for several weeks before being released.

He was shot and killed with a handgun on the road between Tyniec Mały and Wrocław on 19 August 1964. The killer was believed to have been Stanisław Śmigielski, a barber by trade, who posed as a traffic officer and stopped Ż.’s car. He demanded that Ż. pay a fine, after which he shot him in the head. The killer was quickly caught by the militia and sentenced to death. The Council of State refused to pardon him and he was hanged in 1964. The case raised many controversies and doubts. In order to calm the public opinion, the Security Service (SB) handed the case files over to Tomasz Chaciński, a writer registered as a Secret Associate, who wrote a two-part essay in a 1969 issue of the “Odra” magazine in which he confirmed the official version of events as a random attack.

== The fate of the "Ostrów executioner" ==
Neither Polish nor German prosecutors were ever able to pinpoint the identity of Gestapo officer "Cyk", called the "Ostrów executioner" and "the greatest murderer of Poles and Jews". His crimes were documented as having been perpetrated by "Cyk" in numerous post-war testimonies from Warsaw and Ludwigsburg. He had deliberately manipulated and erased his own identity during the occupation, using a false surname, profession, and place of birth instead. He had been part of the Polish-speaking German community prior to the war and had a perfect command of both Polish and German. The residents of Ostrów Mazowiecka searched for him after the withdrawal of the German forces from the town. The "Ostrów executioner" had displayed exceptional sadism and personally murdered both adults and children.

== The fate of the commanders and members of the 91st SS Police Regiment ==
Only commanders Hans Hoffmann, Theodor Pilich and Kurt Kirschner were brought before the German court in 1964 in connection with the killing of the Ostrów Mazowiecka Jews. The SS-men who had carried out the executions appeared at the trial as witnesses. The members of the 91st SS Police Regiment were pronounced not guilty as the court found that they had carried out "an order concerning matters of service" and it was deemed that they had "had no freedom to make their own decisions". The commanders received a 3-year prison sentence of which they served 7 months.

The German prosecutors did not consult Poland's Main Commission for the Investigation of German Crimes (GKBZH), and not a single Polish witness of the murder in Ostrów Mazowiecka appeared during the hearing. The judges based their ruling solely on Jewish testimonies, but none of the Jews who survived the Holocaust had actually seen the crime themselves. The lack of eyewitnesses did not go unnoticed by the German judges and the Jewish testimonies were not included in the indictment as a result.

Theodor Pilich went on to become the director of all the IG Farben labor camps in the Auschwitz complex. Hoffmann was promoted to the rank of Major in the Ordnungspolizei and served in Bohemia and Moravia. Kurt Kirschner served in western Westfalia and later in Yugoslavia. The SS police court sentenced him to 16 months in prison in 1943 for acts of sadism, but he was released after half a year. Thereafter, he joined Oskar Dirlewanger's SS unit and aided in the suppression of the Warsaw Uprising in 1944.

== The Polish investigation ==
The official investigation into the crimes on the Jews was led by prosecutor Jan Traczewski in 1971 at the behest of the town's residents. He questioned Leokadia Blicharska, Czesław Świderek, Edward Puścizna, Antoni Zawadzki, Franciszek Białek, Kazimierz Szwajkowski, Aleksander Karpiński, Stanisław Jastrzębski, Czesław Tomczykowski, Szczepan Piłkowski, Stanisław Wędzik, Irena Strzemecka, Helena Cholewińska, Helena Goldberg, Regina Grabowska, Janina Brodzik, Jan Kwiatkowski, Franciszek Modzelan and Stanisław Jastrzębski.

The Polish testimonies were not taken into account by the authors of the German monograph Judenmord in Ostrów Mazowiecka.

== Controversies ==
The family of Jadwiga Długoborska was not able to testify before and reveal the truth to the GKBZH for a very long time due to their pre-war associations with the Border Protection Corps, the General Staff, the Polish Armed Forces, the RAF, and later on the killing of Emil Ż. in 1964 and the unexplained fate of the killer which was a subject of interest for the UB/SB.

Of Jadwiga's three sisters: Janina Mika, a secretary in the Warsaw branch of the Border Protection Corps, fled to Bydgoszcz; Seweryna Barbara Bohdanowicz, a telegraph operator at the General Staff in Warsaw (interned in Romania along with the Polish government), remained in Nottingham after the war with her husband Maj. Edward Bohdanowicz, a prisoner of Soviet labor camps, RAF pilot (“Ziemia Mazowiecka” and “Ziemia Wielkopolska” squadrons) and knight of the Order of Virtuti Militari; Wanda Wujcik, the wife of Lt Władysław Wujcik, a prisoner of the II-C Woldenburg POW camp and knight of the War Order of Virtuti Militari, fled to Gdynia. Długoborska's cousin, Halina Socharska pseud. “Brzostowa”, a doctor of medicine, soldier of the Home Army “Opocznik” division, prisoner in Auschwitz-Birkenau and widow of Lt Maciej Socharski, an RAF pilot who was shot down over the Netherlands by the Germans in 1941, fled UB persecution to Wrocław. Only Cecylia Pachecka, the widow of a Border Guard officer, remained in Ostrów. In 1947, her son Andrzej Pachecka, a medical student and witness to the arrest of Jadwiga Długoborska, was arrested in Wrocław by the UB and sentenced to 7 months in prison because a university colleague had been caught in possession of a weapon.

The identity of the criminal "Cyk" was not revealed during his lifetime. The SB was under the belief that he was someone living in the Polish People's Republic. Prosecutor Jan Traczewski attempted to resolve the "Cyk" case at the beginning of the 1970s but he was required to give up the search on account of certain documents delivered to him by the SB. The murder of Jadwiga Długoborska and the final mass extermination in Ostrów Mazowiecka was only revealed in witness testimony to the Main Commission for the Investigation of German Crimes in the years 1980–1984. In the end, judge Eugenia Wilkowska-Neffe did not record the reasons for Długoborska's arrest during the questioning of Wanda Wujcik, but she gave the address of the writer and regional researcher Mieczysław Bartniczak in order to “commemorate her sister”. This led to the letters between Wanda Wujcik and Mieczysław Bartniczak which aided in the writing of two books on Długoborska's fragmented history: Od Andrzejewa do Pecynki [From Andrzejew to Pecynka] and Ostrów Mazowiecka i okolice [Ostrów Mazowiecka and its environs].

The GKBZH judge committed a judicial falsification in her justification to discontinue the investigation, shifting the blame for the death of Długoborska and several dozen other residents of Ostrów Mazowiecka from the Gestapo to the German gendarmerie.

The events that took place during the arrest in Długoborska's boarding house have not been fully explained. According to Wanda Wujcik, the Gestapo entered the building from two sides: from the courtyard and from the street. Jadwiga was the only owner who was there. Her mother and sister with her two children had been put into the concealed rooms where Długoborska usually hid Jews. Emil Ż. was similarly not present at the boarding house on the night of the arrest. There are many indications that Długoborska had been warned of the impending arrest, which was why there were no Jews in the boarding house and why she had hidden her own family in the hiding place.

In 2021, "Cyk" was identified as Anton Peter Psyk, who died in 1976 in West Germany.

== Commemorations ==
Wanda Wujcik tried unsuccessfully to commemorate during the Polish People's Republic. The first commemorations of Jadwiga Długoborska occurred on the 70th anniversary of her death on 29 June 2014, in a ceremony that was attended by the mayor of Ostrów Mazowiecka Władysław Krzyżanowski, Joanna Szczepkowska, Iwona and Bronisław Wildstein, Jan Ołdakowski, Angelika and Grzegorz Górny, the director of the Treblinka extermination camp museum Edward Kopówka, Righteous Among the Nations medal recipient Jadwiga Jóźwik from the Sadowne commune, as well as the local community and the victim's family.

In 2017, the son of the survivor Emil Ż. officially addressed Yad Vashem with an appeal to posthumously bestow the title of Righteous Among the Nations on Jadwiga Długoborska.

The appeal was not presented to the designation commission as the applicant was the son and not the father who had been murdered in 1964. Neither Długoborska's death certificate, signed in 1944 by Emil Ż., nor post-war documentation, nor the prosecutor's records containing the testimony of Emil Ż.’s wife, nor the additional information the son brought forward was taken into account. The fate of Długoborska was the inspiration for the Pilecki Institute Called by Name project, which aims to commemorate Poles who were killed for aiding and rescuing Jews in the places where they lived.

== Bibliography ==
- Gawin, Magdalena (2013), "Pensjonat Jadwigi Długoborskiej", Teologia Polityczna (in Polish), vol. 7, pp. 159–179
- Roth, Marcus; Schmidt, Annalena (2013), Judenmord in Ostrow Mazowiecka. Tat und Ahndung (in German), Berlin
- Hale, Christopher (2012), Kaci Hitlera. Brudny sekret Europy (in Polish), Kraków: Znak, pp. 54–55
- Bartoszewski, Władysław (1970), Warszawski pierścień śmierci (in Polish), Warszawa, pp. 277, 334
- Kwiatkowska-Tochowicz, Ewa (2004), Dzieniszewski, J.; Radwański, E. (eds.), "Moja mała ojczyzna", Gimnazjum i Liceum Ogólnokształcące im. Mikołaja Koprenika w Ostrowi Mazowieckiej (in Polish), Ostrów Mazowiecka, pp. 166–171
- Bartniczak, Mieczysław (1984), Od Andrzejewa do Pecynki 1939–1944 (in Polish), Warszawa
- Bartniczak, Mieczysław (1987), Ostrów Mazowiecka i okolice (in Polish), Warszawa
- Bartniczak, Mieczysław (1974), "Eksterminacja ludności w powiecie Ostrów Mazowiecka (1939–1944)", Rocznik Mazowiecki (in Polish), vol. 5, pp. 147–213
- Landau, Ludwik (1962), Kronika lat wojny i okupacji (in Polish), vol. 2, Warszawa, p. 464
- Böhler, Joachen; Amallman, Klaus-Michael; Matthäus, Jürgen (2009), Ensatzgruppen w Polsce (in Polish), Warszawa, p. 39
- Chaciński, Tomasz (1969), Człowiek, który kosztował (in Polish), vol. 5, Odra, pp. 81–86
