= Called by Name =

Polish project commemorate

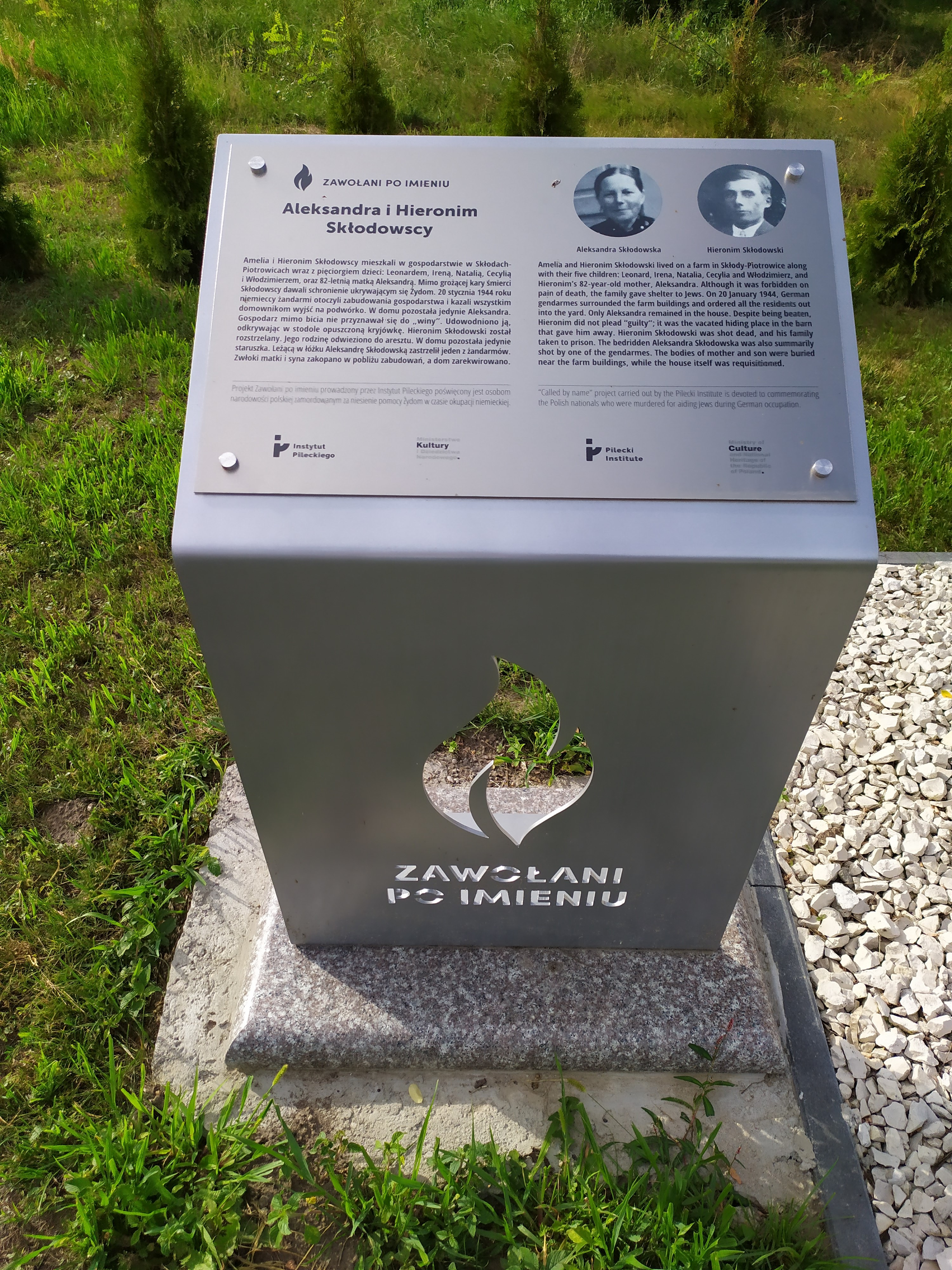
On June 16, 2019, in Skłody-Piotrowice, Aleksandra and Hieronim Skłodowski were commemorated as part of the "Called by Name" project of the Pilecki Institute through the pictured monument.

Called by Name (Polish: Zawołani po imieniu) is a project commemorating Poles who were murdered for aiding Jews during World War II established in 2019 and organized by the Pilecki Institute. By the early 2020s, over 50 individuals have been recognized by the project.

== Origin ==
The project was initiated by Magdalena Gawin, Deputy Minister of Culture and National Heritage and implemented by the Pilecki Institute. The first monument was erected in Sadowne on March 24, 2019, commemorating the Polish Lubkiewicz family, who were murdered in January 1943 for baking bread for Jewish women hiding in the vicinity of the Treblinka extermination camp. By early 2020s, at least 24 such monuments were erected, honoring a total of 55 people who attempted to save over a hundred of Jews. A related exhibition was hosted in Warsaw in October 2020, and various educational activities have also been organized.

The name of the project refers to Zbigniew Herbert's poem Mr. Cogito and its message about the need to precisely count the victims of the Nazi regime.

== Activities ==
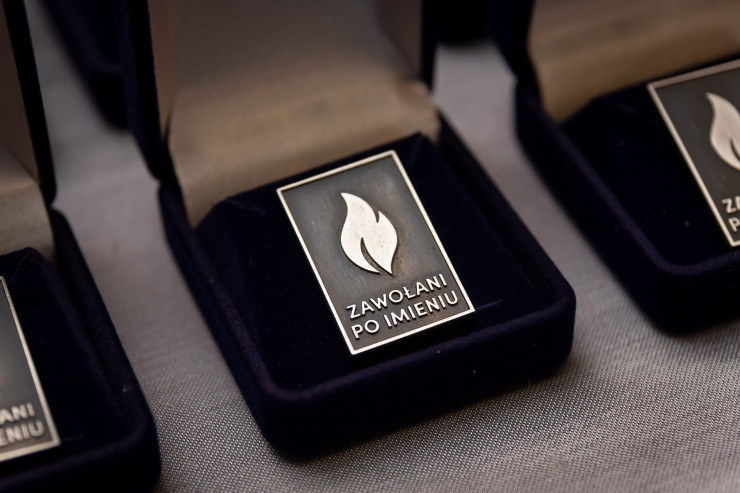
An award awarded posthumously to those recognized by the "Called by Name" project, received by the descendants of the recipients.

The project's goal involve actions to commemorate Poles who were murdered for aiding Jews during World War II by creating monuments and other symbols in the public spaces. The primary method is enacting a plaque with an inscription in Polish and English, placed on a stone monument. Some monuments are accompanied by QR codes through which visitors can access further digital information.

The project involves collecting information of wartime histories of various individuals, and has been called inspirational with regards to preserving family histories and educating people about World War II and The Holocaust history.

The project and the related exhibition have been interpreted as an implied criticism of the Yad Vashem's Righteous Among the Nations program, as some of the individuals honored with Called by Name status have not received a Righteous status.

The project has been described as one of the better known elements of the history policy of the Law and Justice party. The commemoration of Poles who were murdered for trying to rescue Jews has attracted some criticism as being politicized and related to ethnonationalist agenda.

== Recognized individuals ==
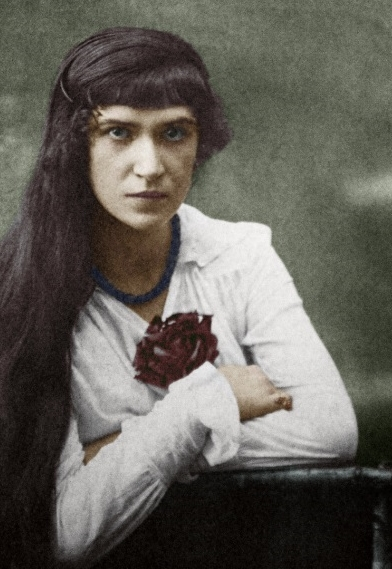
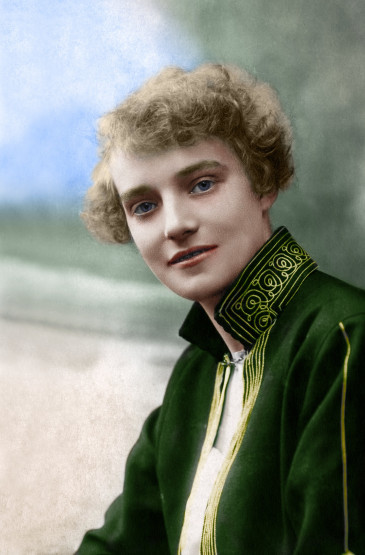
Jadwiga Długoborska and Lucyna Radziejowska were among the first individuals recognized under Called by Name

Some of the individuals recognized by the project include (by date of commemoration):

- the Lubkiewicz family (24 March 2019)
- Piotr Leszczyński (9 June 2019)
- Antoni Prusiński (9 June 2019)
- Aleksandra and Hieronim Skłodowscy (16 June 2019)
- Jadwiga Długoborska (29 June 2019)
- Lucyna Radziejowska (29 June 2019)
- Postek family (30 June 2019)
- Wacław Budziszewski (22 September 2019)
- the Krysiewicz family (Władysława Krysiewicz and Stanisław Krysiewicz) (6 October 2019)
- Franciszek Andrzejczyk (27 October 2019)
- victims of the Paulinów massacre (Franciszek Augustyniak, Zygmunt Drgas, Franciszek Kierylak, Ewa, Józef and Stanisław Kotowscy, Marian Nowicki, Stanisław Piwko, Jan Siwiński, Zygmunt Uziębło and Aleksandra Wiktorzak) (4 June 2020)
- the Sowa family (16 June 2020)
- the Krasuski family (19 June 2020)
- the Banaszek family (19 June 2020)
- Karolina Juszczykowska (22 September 2020)
- victims of the Stary Lipowiec massacre (Katarzyna Grochowicz, Anastazja, Roman and Franciszek Kusiak, Katarzyna Rybak, Jan Zaręba) (8 October 2020)
- Józef Pruchniewicz (23 March 2021)
- the Domański family (28 May 2021)
- Piotr Kościelecki (9 June 2021)
- Bolesław Książek (25 June 2021)
- Antoni Kenigsman (2 July 2021)
- the Likos family Piotr Likos and Apolonia Likos (30 September 2021)
- Leokadia Piątkowska (26 October 2021)
- Jan Maletka (25 November 2021)
- the Kazak family (Sebastian Kazak and Katarzyna Kazak) (24 March 2022)
- Kazimierz Przekora (26 April 2022)
- victims of the Złotopolice massacre (Ignacy Ambroziak, Stanisława Trzcińska, Stefan Trzciński, Władysław Muchowski) (10 May 2022)
- the Dmoch family (Józef Dmoch and Józefa Dmoch) and Jan Kowalski (14 June 2022)
- the Gacoń family (Stanisław Gacoń and Apolonia Gacoń) and Jan Jantoń (22 June 2022)
- Stradowski family (Wacław Stradowski and Marianna Stradowska) (15 September 2022)
- victims of the first Majdan Nowy massacre (see also the second Majdan Nowy massacre; Jan Gniduła and six others - Katarzyna Kowal, Józef Kowal, Marianna Łubiarz, Anastazja Łubiarz, Kazimierz Szabat, Katarzyna Margol) (29 September 2022)
- Michał Stasiuk (29 November 2022)
- Mieczysław Żemojtel, Anna Kowalska (21 June 2023)
- the Ulma family (3 September 2023)
- the Kur family (21 September 2023)
- Aniela Nizioł (3 December 2023)
- the Siniarski family (10 March 2024)

== See also ==
- Markowa Ulma-Family Museum of Poles Who Saved Jews in World War II
