= Gliny =

Gliny may refer to the following places:

- Gliny, Greater Poland Voivodeship (west-central Poland)
- Gliny, Biłgoraj County in Lublin Voivodeship (east Poland)
- Gliny, Chełm County in Lublin Voivodeship (east Poland)
