= Zanie =

Zanie may refer to the following places:

- Zanie, Lublin Voivodeship (east Poland)
- Zanie, Podlaskie Voivodeship (north-east Poland)
- Zanie, Warmian-Masurian Voivodeship (north Poland)
