= Skłodowski =

Skłodowski, feminine: Skłodowska is a Polish surname associated with the noble Skłodowski family. It is a toponymic surname derived from any of the places named Skłody. Notable people with the surname include:

- Aleksandra and Hieronim Skłodowski, Poles murdered by the Nazis for helping Jews
- Bronisława Dłuska née Skłodowska
- Jan Skłodowski (born 1950), historian, photographer, writer, and traveler
- Józef Skłodowski (1804–1882)
- Józef Skłodowski (doctor) (1863–1937)
- Helena Skłodowska-Szalay (1866–1961)
- Maria Skłodowska-Curie, better known as Marie Curie
- Władysław Skłodowski (1832–1902)
- Zbigniew Skłodowski (1920–1942) , leader of the Lithuanian section of the World War II underground paramilitary Polish Scouting Association Grey Ranks

== See also ==
- Skłodowska (disambiguation)
