= Majdan Nowy massacre =

- Part of Occupation of Poland (1939–1945)
- Location: 50°28′09″N 22°43′36″E; Majdan Nowy, Poland
- Date: June 24, 1943
- Target: Village inhabitants
- Attack type: War crime
- Deaths: 28–36
- Perpetrators: Schutzstaffel, Ukrainian Auxiliary Police

The Majdan Nowy massacre was a Nazi war crime perpetrated by the Schutzstaffel and its Ukrainian collaborators in the village of Majdan Nowy within occupied Poland. Taking place on June 24, 1943, this pacification operation resulted in the deaths of an estimated 28 to 36 residents, including women and children. This atrocity was part of the ethnic cleansing of the Zamość region.

== Background ==
Majdan Nowy, situated in Biłgoraj County, Gmina Księżpol (previously part of Gmina Sól until 1954), witnessed its first war crime perpetrated by Nazi occupiers on December 28, 1942. Seven individuals were executed on suspicion of aiding Jews, accompanied by reports of the Germans setting fire to ten buildings within the village.

In the autumn of 1942, at the direction of SS-Brigadeführer Odilo Globocnik, SS and Police Leader in the Lublin district of the General Government, a significant Nazi displacement operation commenced in the Zamość region. Its aim was to remove around 100,000 Poles from this area and replace them with German settlers, primarily comprising ethnic Germans from various European countries. The initial displacements began on the night of November 27–28, 1942, extending to 60 villages housing approximately 34,000 individuals by the end of December. The second phase of the operation lasted from mid-January to the end of March 1943 and covered mainly the areas of the Hrubieszów County. Inhabitants of 63 villages were then displaced.

The Nazi actions faced passive resistance from the displaced populace and armed responses from the Polish resistance movement. Partisan units from the Peasant Battalions (Bataliony Chłopskie), Home Army (Armia Krajowa), and communist People's Guard (Gwardia Ludowa) attempted to impede pacification and displacement efforts, targeting German police, economic sites, and transportation facilities. They also conducted retaliatory actions in villages settled by German colonists. The resistance put up by the Polish partisans, combined with the difficult situation of German troops on the Eastern Front, forced the occupiers to temporarily suspend the deportations.

== The massacre ==
At the end of June 1943, the Nazis resumed their displacement operation, focusing on villages in Biłgoraj County. The expulsion of the Polish population coincided with widespread pacification and anti-partisan activities. As part of the Aktion Werwolf (Operation Werewolf) that summer, the occupiers executed approximately 1,000 Poles across 163 villages in the Zamość region.

On June 24, Majdan Nowy was surrounded by SS troops, aided by Ukrainian collaborators. They effectively cut off all access to the village. This led to panic among the villagers, prompting them to prepare for displacement by relocating their belongings. An armored car conducted reconnaissance, circling the village buildings.

After some time, the German and Ukrainian forces withdrew from their positions, leading villagers to believe the deportation had been abandoned. However, the village was suddenly bombarded by German field artillery, resulting in fires and casualties among the residents. Attempts to flee were met with machine gun fire.

Approximately an hour later, infantry troops entered the village. Witnesses reported that many SS men appeared intoxicated as they indiscriminately killed villagers, regardless of age or gender, and set buildings ablaze. Despite this, some residents managed to escape. The Nazis withdrew after about two hours.

Estimates of the casualties from the pacification vary, with reported figures ranging between 28, 34, or 36 individuals. The identities of 28 victims were established, including ten women and two children under 15 years old. The youngest victim was 2 years old, while the oldest was 68. Additionally, 58 farms were destroyed during the pacification.

== Aftermath ==
On July 2, the Germans revisited Majdan Nowy. Survivors of the pacification were either deported for forced labor or sent to the Majdanek concentration camp. Between June 26 and July 10, 1943, an estimated 2,589 individuals, primarily men, were expelled from all nine communities in the Gmina Sól. Reports documenting the pacification of Majdan Nowy were recorded in the documents of the Polish Underground State.

== Bibliography ==
- Fajkowski, Józef (1972). Wieś w ogniu. Eksterminacja wsi polskiej w okresie okupacji hitlerowskiej [A countryside on fire. The extermination of the Polish villages during the Nazi occupation] (in Polish). Warszawa: Ludowa Spółdzielnia Wydawnicza.
- Fajkowski, Józef; Religa, Jan (1981). Zbrodnie hitlerowskie na wsi polskiej 1939–1945 [Nazi crimes in the Polish countryside 1939–1945] (in Polish). Warszawa: Książka i Wiedza.
- Jaczyńska, Agnieszka (2012). Sonderlaboratorium SS. Zamojszczyzna: "pierwszy obszar osiedleńczy" w Generalnym Gubernatorstwie [SS' special laboratory. Zamość region: a "first settlement territory" in the General Government] (in Polish). Lublin: Instytut Pamięci Narodowej – Komisja Ścigania Zbrodni przeciwko Narodowi Polskiemu. Oddział w Lublinie. ISBN 978-83-7629-383-7.
- Madajczyk, Czesław (1965). Hitlerowski terror na wsi polskiej 1939–1945. Zestawienie większych akcji represyjnych [Nazi terror in the Polish countryside 1939–1945. List of major repressive actions] (in Polish). Warszawa: Państwowe Wydawnictwo Naukowe.
- Madajczyk, Czesław, ed. (1979). Zamojszczyzna – Sonderlaboratorium SS. Zbiór dokumentów polskich i niemieckich z okresu okupacji hitlerowskiej [Zamość region - the SS' special laboratory. Collection of Polish and German documents from the period of Nazi occupation] (in Polish). Vol. I&II. Warszawa: Ludowa Spółdzielnia Wydawnicza.
- Mikoda, Janina, ed. (1994). Rejestr miejsc i faktów zbrodni popełnionych przez okupanta hitlerowskiego na ziemiach polskich w latach 1939–1945. Województwo zamojskie [Register of places and facts of crimes committed by the Nazi Occupier on Polish Lands in the years 1939–1945. Zamość Voivodeship] (in Polish). Warszawa: GKBZHwP-IPN. ISBN 83-903356-0-3.
