= Holocaust distortion =

Distortion of the genocide of Jews in World War II

According to the International Holocaust Remembrance Alliance, Holocaust distortion is "rhetoric, written work, or other media that excuse, minimize, or misrepresent the known historical record". Not all Holocaust distortion is done with malice, some is the result of uneducated assumptions leading to further distortion; regardless, the half truths that Holocaust distortion creates can lead to instigating antisemitism.

== When it began ==
Holocaust distortion began with the Holocaust itself. The Nazis and their collaborators destroyed evidence of their crimes against humanity, manipulated images that appeared to incriminate them, and spread disinformation to hide their actions from the international community. An instance of this manipulation is the use of propaganda that tricked the Danish and International Red Cross during their visit to the Theresienstadt ghetto in 1944. The Nazis carefully masked the distressing living conditions within the ghetto and presented a facade of normalcy that misled the visiting representatives, who did not see anything wrong during their visit.

== Definition ==
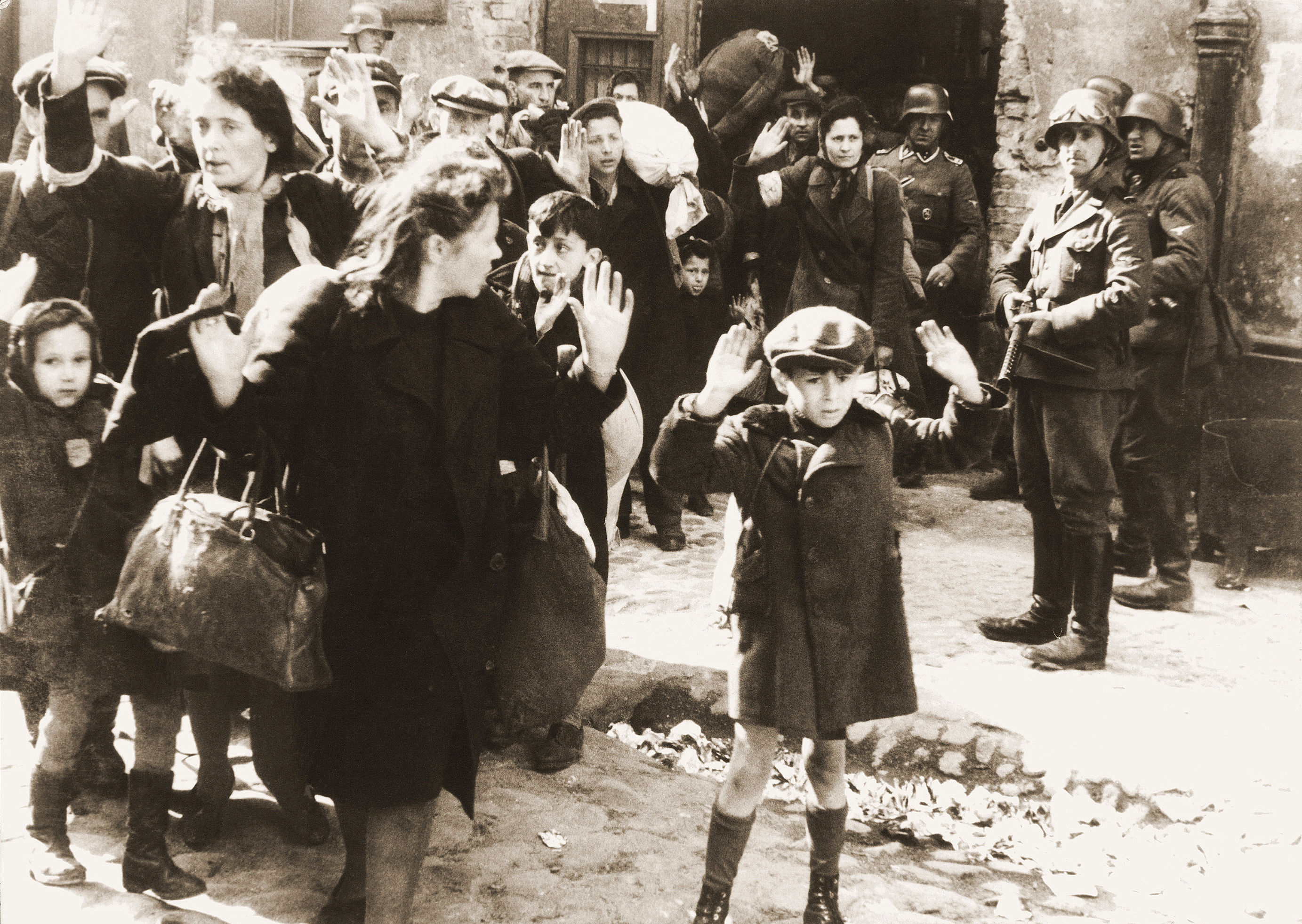
Polish Jews captured by Germans during the suppression of the Warsaw Ghetto Uprising (Poland) - Photo from Jürgen Stroop Report to Heinrich Himmler from May 1943. One of the most famous pictures of World War II.

Holocaust distortion is similar to Holocaust denial. However, instead of denial of historical facts, distortion is more subtle. A professor of history at the University of Ottawa, Jan Grabowski says, “Unlike Holocaust deniers, people and institutions engaging in Holocaust distortion do not deny the factuality of the Jewish catastrophe. They just deny that their nation, or their ethnic group had anything to do with the fact”.

Ben Cohen, a writer for Jewish affairs and Middle Eastern politics, defines Holocaust distortion as "the practice of rewriting Holocaust history to suit contemporary political imperatives." With the rise of social media, and other forms of digital media, Holocaust distortion, and the false information that comes with it, has become much more common. It is able to spread much more rapidly than in years past.

=== Different forms ===
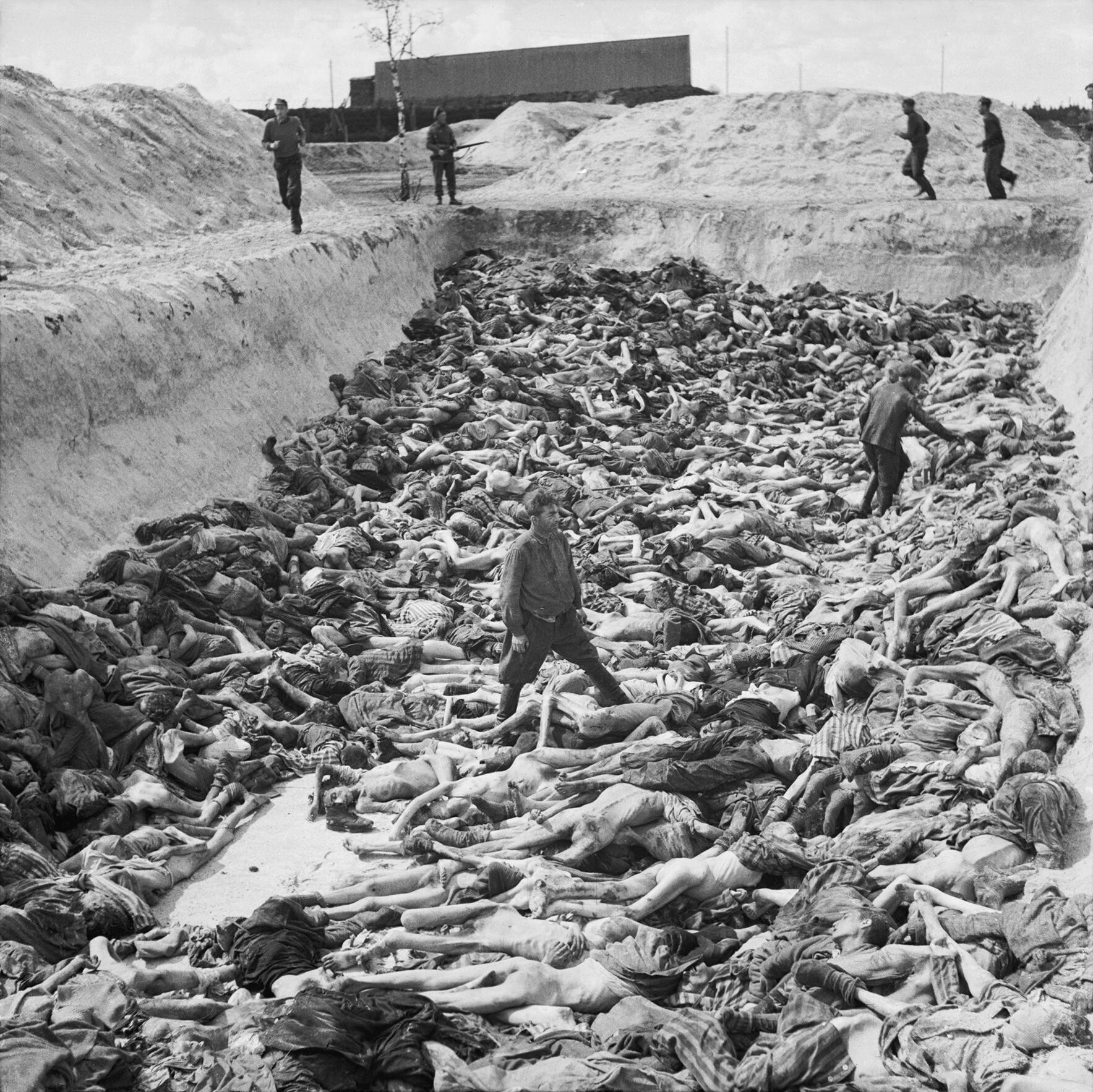
The Liberation of Bergen-belsen Concentration Camp, April 1945 Dr Fritz Klein, the camp doctor, standing in a mass grave at Belsen. Klein, who was born in Austro-Hungary, was an early member of the Nazi Party and joined the SS in 1943. He worked in Auschwitz-Birkenau for a year from December 1943 where he assisted in the selection of prisoners to be sent to the gas chambers. After a brief period at Neungamme, Klein moved to Belsen in January 1945. Klein was subsequently convicted of two counts of war crimes and executed in December 1945.

The Holocaust Alliance shares the different forms of Holocaust distortion.

- Minimizing in any way the Holocaust (number of victims, efforts, and roles of collaborators and allies of Nazi Germany)
- Any attempt to obscure responsibilities for crimes of the Holocaust
- Victim blaming
- Casting the Holocaust as a positive historical event
- Accusing victims of "using" the Holocaust for "self-benefit".
- Use of the term “Holocaust” to refer to events or concepts that are not related to the genocide of European and North African Jewry by Nazi Germany and its collaborators.
- State-sponsored manipulation of Holocaust history to sow political discord within or outside a country's borders.
- Trivializing or honoring the historical legacies of people or organizations responsible for enabling or directly supporting the Holocaust.
- Using imagery and language associated with the Holocaust for political, ideological, or commercial purposes unrelated to this history in online and offline forums.

Juliane Wetzel, Chair of the IHRA's Committee on Antisemitism and Holocaust Denial, says, "Holocaust distortion focuses, for example, on exaggerating the number of rescuers and whitewashing or glorifying collaborators. Sometimes it is even used to raise awareness of different issues without having intended to minimize the Holocaust, but rather to bring attention to the respective issue."

== Events and examples ==
Holocaust distortion is exemplified by countries denying their institutions' and citizens' roles in the genocide of Jews. Jan Grabowski highlighted an event at the Treblinka railway station in November 2021 where a monument honored Jan Maletka, a Polish railroad worker allegedly killed for trying to provide water to Jews on a Holocaust train, was unveiled. Both the memorial, and speech of Magdalena Gawin, the Polish deputy minister of Culture, focused on one Polish man, neglecting the larger tragedy of 925,000 Jews murdered in nearby Treblinka extermination camp. Grabowski also emphasized another distortion of history, pointing out Gawin's omission of the locals' greed in profiting from selling water to dehydrated Jews in Holocaust trains.

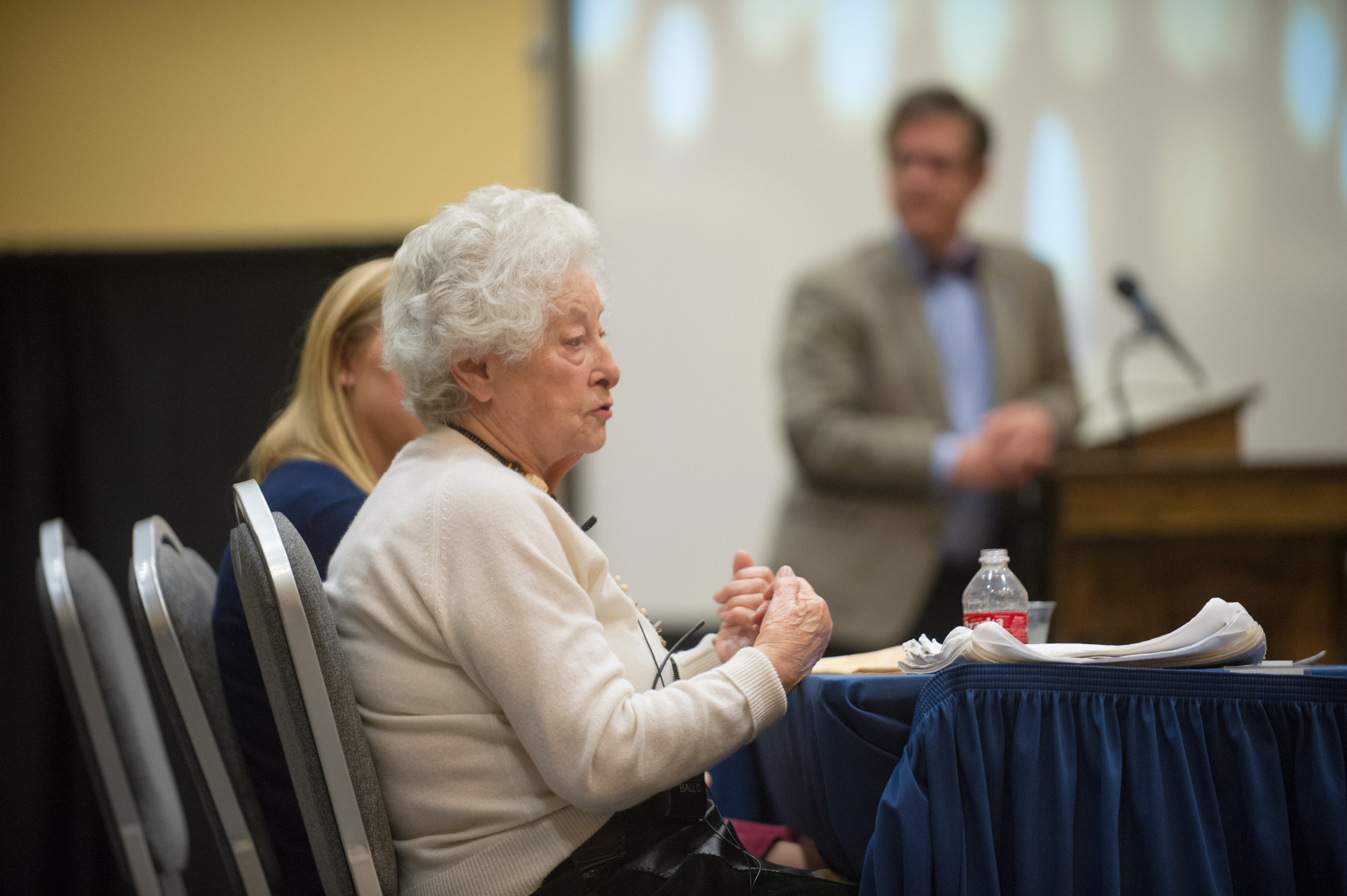
15133-Holocaust Remembrance Day Margaret Furst-8515

Another instance of Holocaust distortion takes place in Hungary. In Hungary, over 400,000 Jews were deported to concentration camps. There is still a very high Jewish population in Hungary because of the Jews that were able to hide and escape. In an article written by Henriet Kovács and Ursula K. Mindler-Steiner, historians on Politics in Central Europe wrote an article on how the Hungarian government has tried to cover up their wrongs of the past. “...the Hungarian government has been trying to improve the country's image. The year 2014 was designated the Holocaust Memorial Year. In this way, the government tried to “exculpate” itself internationally from accusations that it was not fighting anti-Semitism sufficiently.” In order to cover up the horrible part Hungary played, the government created a year dedicated to Jews as well as memorials instead of acknowledging what had happened.

In “Forgetting the Führer: the Recent History of the Holocaust Denial Movement in Germany,” it goes over key people that have been leaders in the spread of misinformation of the Holocaust. One it specifically talks about is the German Ernest Zundel has contributed to the distribution of false information to over 41 countries.

== Efforts to combat it ==
Dr. Manfred Gerstenfeld is emeritus chairman (2000–2012) of the Jerusalem Center for Public Affairs, and has won numerous awards for his work. Gerstenfeld has written many books, one of them being titled, The Abuse of Holocaust Memory: Distortions and Responses. Gerstenfeld talks about how holocaust distortion is to be prevented. "Preserving Holocaust memory correctly requires documentation; education; the establishment of monuments, museums, and memorials, ceremonies and remembrance days; as well as commemorative projects. Legislation and art are other spheres that have made important contributions." Creating more memorials to honor what truly happened as well as enforcing correct education about the holocaust can not only combat the distortion that has already happened, but help to prevent further distortions as well.

Holocaust distortion is being recognised in many countries. Professor Michael J. Bazyler, who is a Research Fellow International Institute for Holocaust Studies, as well as a professor of law in Whittier Law School California. He wrote an article that mentions the new laws created since Holocaust distortion and denial have been brought to light.

Section 130 of the German Penal Code prohibits denial or playing down of the genocide committed under the National Socialist regime (§ 130.3), including through dissemination of publications (§ 130.4). This includes public denial or gross trivialization of international crimes, especially genocide/the Holocaust.

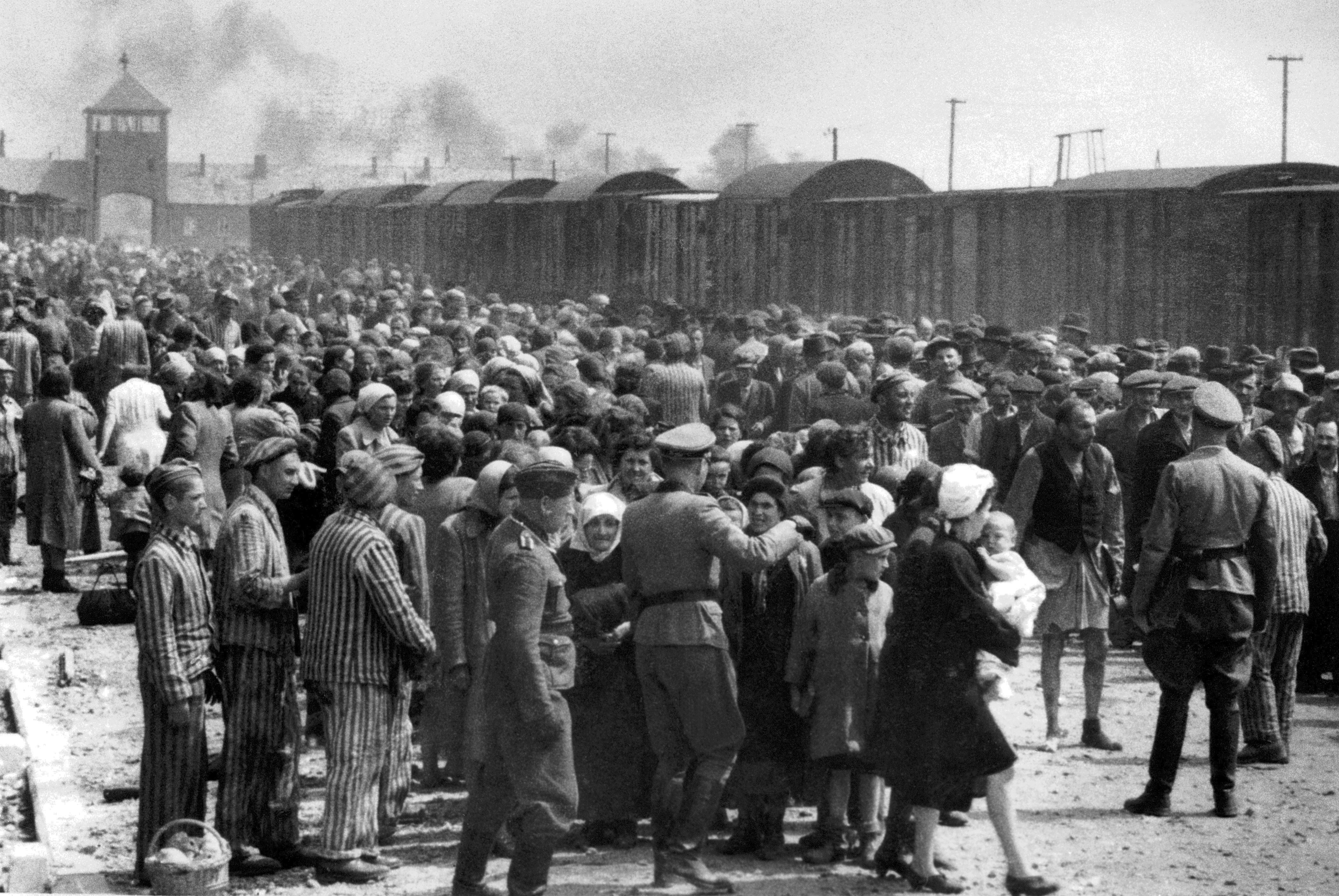
"Selection" of Hungarian Jews on the ramp at Auschwitz-II-Birkenau in German-occupied Poland, May/June 1944, during the final phase of the Holocaust. Jews were sent either to work or to the gas chamber.

In 1994, Holocaust denial became a criminal offense under a general anti-incitement law. The law states that incitement, denial, approval of Nazism, trivialization or approval, in public or in an assembly, of actions of the National Socialist regime, is a criminal offense. The 1994 amendment increased the penalty to up to five years imprisonment. It also extended the ban on Nazi symbols and anything that might resemble Nazi slogans.”

Germany is putting laws into place that help to combat Holocaust distortion, along with any other countries. In order to keep false information from spreading, penalties, fines, and jail time are being enforced.

The Holocaust Alliance hosts many dialogues for teachers and educators in order to counter holocaust distortion. There are also many seminars that are being held for teachers and educators about holocaust education. These seminars are meant to help educators share the correct facts about the holocaust, in order to try and prevent further distortions from happening. These seminars share information that is not commonly taught in classrooms, as well as busting myths about the holocaust.

== See also ==
- Holocaust denial
- Antisemitism
- Nazi slogans
- Concentration camps
- Theresienstadt Ghetto
- International Holocaust Remembrance Alliance
