= Borki, Biłgoraj County =

Borki
- Village
- Location within Poland
- Coordinates: 50°25′37″N 22°41′35″E
- Country: Poland
- Voivodeship: Lublin
- County: Biłgoraj
- Gmina: Księżpol

Population
  - Total: 126

Borki [ˈbɔrki] is a village in the administrative district of Gmina Księżpol, within Biłgoraj County, Lublin Voivodeship, in eastern Poland.
