= Płusy, Lublin Voivodeship =

Płusy
- Village
- Location within Poland
- Coordinates: 50°23′44″N 22°44′39″E
- Country: Poland
- Voivodeship: Lublin
- County: Biłgoraj
- Gmina: Księżpol

Population
  - Total: 449

Płusy [ˈpwusɨ] is a village in the administrative district of Gmina Księżpol, within Biłgoraj County, Lublin Voivodeship, in eastern Poland.
