= Urszula Kozioł =

Polish poet and writer (1931–2025)

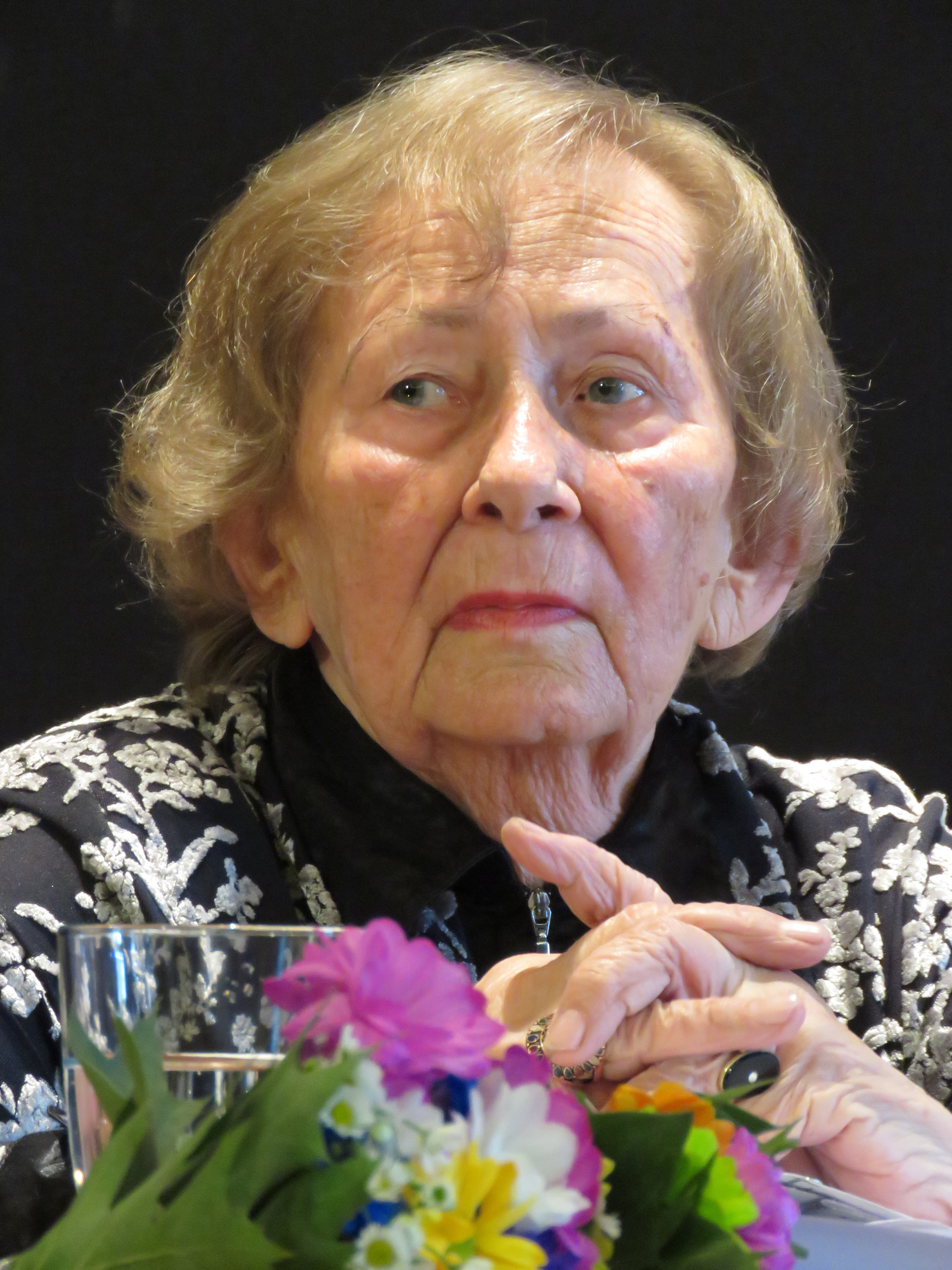
- Kozioł in 2016
- Born: 20 June 1931; Rakówka, Poland
- Died: 20 July 2025 (aged 94)
- Education: University of Wrocław
- Occupations: Poet; writer; dramatist
- Writing career
- Genre: Fiction
- Notable works: Supliki (2006); Klangor (2015); Ucieczki (2017); Raptularz (2023)

Urszula Kozioł (Polish: [ˈur.ʂu.la kɔˈʑɔw]; 20 June 1931 – 20 July 2025) was a Polish poet and writer. She was a recipient of the Silesius Poetry Award (2011) and the Nike Award (2024).

== Life and career ==
Kozioł was born in Rakówka, a village in Poland on 20 June 1931. She attended high school in Zamość and graduated from the University of Wroclaw in 1953.

Her debut poetry collection was Gumowe klocki ("Blocks of rubber", 1957), but her second, W rytmie korzeni ("In the Rhythm of the Roots", 1963), is considered her breakthrough. Of her 1963 poem "Recipe for the Meat Course", translator Karen Kovacik writes that it "functions simultaneously as an ars poetica and an ironic riposte to those who believed a woman's place was in the kitchen" and "depict[s] housework or domestic life through motifs of violence and estrangement."

Her novel Postoje pamięci ("Stations of Memory", 1965) focuses on Mirka, the daughter of a teacher, growing up in a small village during World War II. In his survey of Polish literature, Czesław Miłosz wrote that it was "One of the most authentic testimonies on the village".

She began editing the magazine Odra in 1968. She also wrote stage and radio dramas for adults and children.

In 2024, she was awarded Poland's most prestigious literary prize, the Nike Award, for her collection of poetry entitled Raptularz.

Kozioł died on 20 July 2025, at the age of 94.

== Selected awards and honours ==
- Nike Award (2024)
- Gloria Artis Gold Medal for Merit to Culture (2024)
- Kazimierz Hoffman Poetry Prize (2020)
- Warsaw Literary Prize (2015)
- Silesius Poetry Lifetime Achievement Award (2011)
- Honorary Citizen of the City of Wrocław (2009)
- Honorary doctorate of the University of Wrocław
- Der Eichendorff Literatur-Preis (2002)
- Polish PEN Club Award (1998)
- Commander's Cross of the Order of Polonia Restituta (1997)
- Knight's Cross of the Order of Polonia Restituta (1981)
- Cold Cross of Merit (1974)
- Kościelski Award (1969)

== Bibliography ==
=== Poetry ===
- Gumowe klocki (Związek Literatów Polskich, Oddział we Wrocławiu, 1957)
- W rytmie korzeni (Ossolineum, 1963)
- Smuga i promień (Ludowa Spółdzielnia Wydawnicza, 1965)
- Lista obecności (Ludowa Spółdzielnia Wydawnicza, 1967)
- Poezje wybrane (Ludowa Spółdzielnia Wydawnicza, 1969)
- W rytmie słońca (Wydawnictwo Literackie, 1974)
- Wybór wierszy (Spółdzielnia Wydawnicza "Czytelnik", 1976)
- Poezje wybrane (II) (Ludowa Spółdzielnia Wydawnicza, 1985; ISBN 83-205-3842-4)
- Wybór wierszy (Spółdzielnia Wydawnicza "Czytelnik", 1986; ISBN 83-07-01527-8)
- Żalnik (Wydawnictwo Literackie, 1989; ISBN 83-08-02464-X , 83-08-02464-5, OCLC 830079123)
- Dziesięć lat przed końcem wieku (nakładem autorki; maszynopis powielany, brak daty i miejsca wydania; ok. 1990)
- Postoje słowa (Wydawnictwo Dolnośląskie, 1994)
- Wielka pauza (Wydawnictwo Literackie, 1996; ISBN 83-08-02653-2)
- W płynnym stanie (Wydawnictwo Literackie, 1998; ISBN 83-08-02885-3)
- Wiersze niektóre (Bis, 1997, 1998; ISBN 83-87082-30-9)
- Stany nieoczywistości (Państwowy Instytut Wydawniczy, 1999; ISBN 83-06-02752-3)
- Supliki (Wydawnictwo Literackie, 2005; ISBN 83-08-03759-3)
- Przelotem (Wydawnictwo Literackie, 2007; ISBN 978-83-08-04102-4)
- Horrendum (Wydawnictwo Literackie, 2010; ISBN 978-83-08-04453-7)
- Fuga (1955-2010) (Biuro Literackie, 2011; ISBN 978-83-62006-47-2)
- Klangor (Wydawnictwo Literackie, 2014; ISBN 978-83-08-05321-8)
- Ucieczki (Wydawnictwo Literackie, 2016; ISBN 978-83-08-06158-9)

=== Prose ===
- Postoje pamięci (Ludowa Spółdzielnia Wydawnicza, 1964, 1973, 1977; Atut-Wrocławskie Wydawnictwo Oświatowe 2004, ISBN 83-89247-98-4).
- Ptaki dla myśli (Ludowa Spółdzielnia Wydawnicza 1971; wyd. 2 poprawione i rozszerzone: Wydawnictwo Literackie 1984, ISBN 83-08-01082-2)
- Noli me tangere (Państwowy Instytut Wydawniczy 1984; ISBN 83-06-00814-6)

=== Essays ===
- Z poczekalni oraz Osobnego sny i przypowieści (Wydawnictwo Literackie, 1978)
- Osobnego sny i przypowieści (Okis, 1997; Biblioteka Wrocławskiego Oddziału Stowarzyszenia Pisarzy Polskich; ISBN 83-87104-00-0)

=== Drama ===
- Gonitwy (Prapremiera: Zespół Teatralny przy Wyższej Szkole Inżynieryjskiej, Rzeszów 1972)
- Kobieta niezależna ("Scena" 12/1976)
- Biało i duszno (układ dramatyczny) ("Scena" 10/1977)
- Król malowany (na motywach baśni J. Ch. Andersena pt. Nowe szaty króla 1978; druk: Zjednoczone Przedsiębiorstwa Rozrywkowe, Ośrodek Teatru Otwartego "Kalambur", 1986)
- Narada familijna ("Teatr Polskiego Radia" 2/1978)
- Przerwany wykład ("Scena" 12/1978)
- Weekend ("Opole" nr 1/1981 i nr 2/1981)
- Spartolino, czyli jak Rzempoła ze szwagrem Pitołą stracha przydybali (Prapremiera: Wrocławski Ośrodek Teatru Otwartego "Kalambur" 1982)
- Trzy Światy (Czytelnik, 1982; ISBN 83-07-00707-0)
- Podwórkowcy (Prapremiera: Teatr Dramatyczny im. J. Szaniawskiego, Wałbrzych 1983; spektakl TV 1984)
- Psujony ("Scena" 1/1985)
- Magiczne imię (Wydawnictwo Literackie, 1985; ISBN 83-08-01194-2)
