= Marianna Łubiarz =

Polish farmer (1866–1942)

Marianna Łubiarz (1866 – 29 December 1942) was a Polish farmer executed by the Nazis during Second World War for helping Jews hide and flee.

== Life ==
Łubiarz worked as a farm laborer in Majdan Nowy, Biłgoraj County, Poland.

During the liquidation of the ghettos in Biłgoraj, Tarnogród, and Józefów in the fall of 1942, a few Jews managed to escape and find shelter in local forests and abandoned buildings. Among those who helped them was the family of Marianna Łubiarz.

On 29 December 1942, German police conducted a raid in Majdan Nowy. As a result, the Jews in hiding were caught, including the three-member Feil family, who had been helped by the Kowal family. They were then murdered and their property looted. The Germans also carried out numerous arson attacks. The Germans brought a Jewish woman, Ita Becher, in a cart, tortured her to force her to reveal the names of people helping Jews. and then killed her.

For helping Jews in hiding, the Germans brutally interrogated and then shot Jan Gniduła, Katarzyna Kowal, Józef Kowal, Marianna Łubiarz, Anastazja Łubiarz (her daughter), Katarzyna Margol, and Kazimierz Szabat. They were buried in the cemetery in Majdan Stary.

On 29 September 2022, in Nowy Majdan, on the initiative of the Pilecki Institute, a plaque commemorating those murdered on 29 December 1942 for helping Jews, including Marianna Łubiarz, was ceremoniously unveiled as part of the project “Called by Name”.
