= Lucyna Radziejowska =

Polish teacher

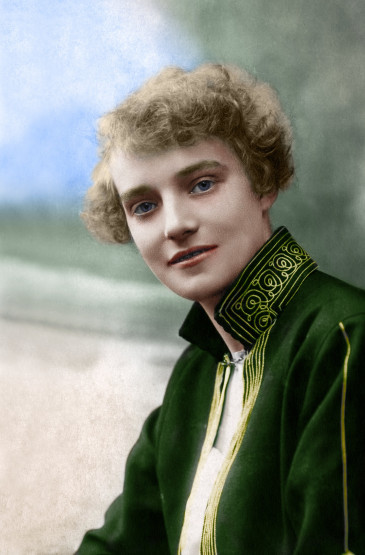
- Born: 24 June 1899; Popowo Kościelne, Poland
- Died: 20 March 1944 (aged 44); Auschwitz-Birkenau, Poland
- Cause of death: typhus
- Occupation: teacher
- Known for: helping Jews during World War II
- Spouse: Wincenty Radziejowski
- Children: Anna Danuta (born 1931)

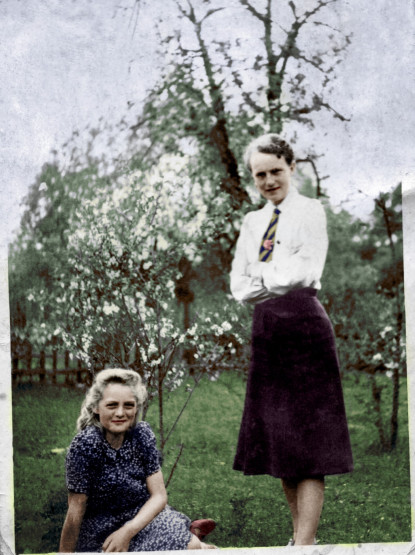
Lucyna Radziejowska with daughter Anna

Lucyna Władysława Radziejowska (24 June 1899 – 20 March 1944) was a Polish teacher known for lending aid to Jews during World War II. For this she was arrested by the Germans and murdered in the Auschwitz concentration camp.

== Biography ==
Lucyna Radziejowska was born in Popowo Kościelne in 1899. She married Wincenty Radziejowski. They had a daughter, Anna Danuta (born in 1931).

In 1941, the Radziejowskis gave shelter to the Soviet prisoner of war Volodya Koltun, an escapee from the POW camp for Soviet soldiers located in Grądy. He had contracted typhus while in the camp and the whole Radziejowski family soon became infected as well. Wincenty Radziejowski succumbed to the disease and died on 5 December 1941. Volodya Koltun remained in Płatkownica for approximately a year until June 1941, when he decided to leave the Radziejowskis due to the increasing number of German patrols in the area.

In 1943, Lucyna Radziejowska took a woman and her 15-year-old son into her home. The Germans probably murdered the Jews who were trying to hide. Lucyna Radziejowska was taken and detained in Sokołów Podlaski, then moved to the Pawiak prison in Warsaw. On 5 October 1943, she was transported to the Auschwitz concentration camp, where she received prisoner number 64478. She became infected with typhus once more and was murdered in the camp on 20 March 1944.

== Commemorations ==
Lucyna Radziejowska and her daughter were nominated by the Chief Commission for the Prosecution of Crimes against the Polish Nation to bestow the honorary title of "Righteous Among the Nations".

On 29 June 2019, a plaque commemorating Lucyna Radziejowska was unveiled in Ostrów Mazowiecka as part of the “Called by Name” project undertaken by the Pilecki Institute.
