= Markowicze-Cegielnia =

- Village
- Location within Poland
- Coordinates: 50°27′13″N 22°45′9″E
- Country: Poland
- Voivodeship: Lublin
- County: Biłgoraj
- Gmina: Księżpol

Markowicze-Cegielnia [markɔˈvit͡ʂɛ t͡sɛˈɡʲɛlɲa] is a village in the administrative district of Gmina Księżpol, within Biłgoraj County, Lublin Voivodeship, in eastern Poland.
