= Zynie =

- Village
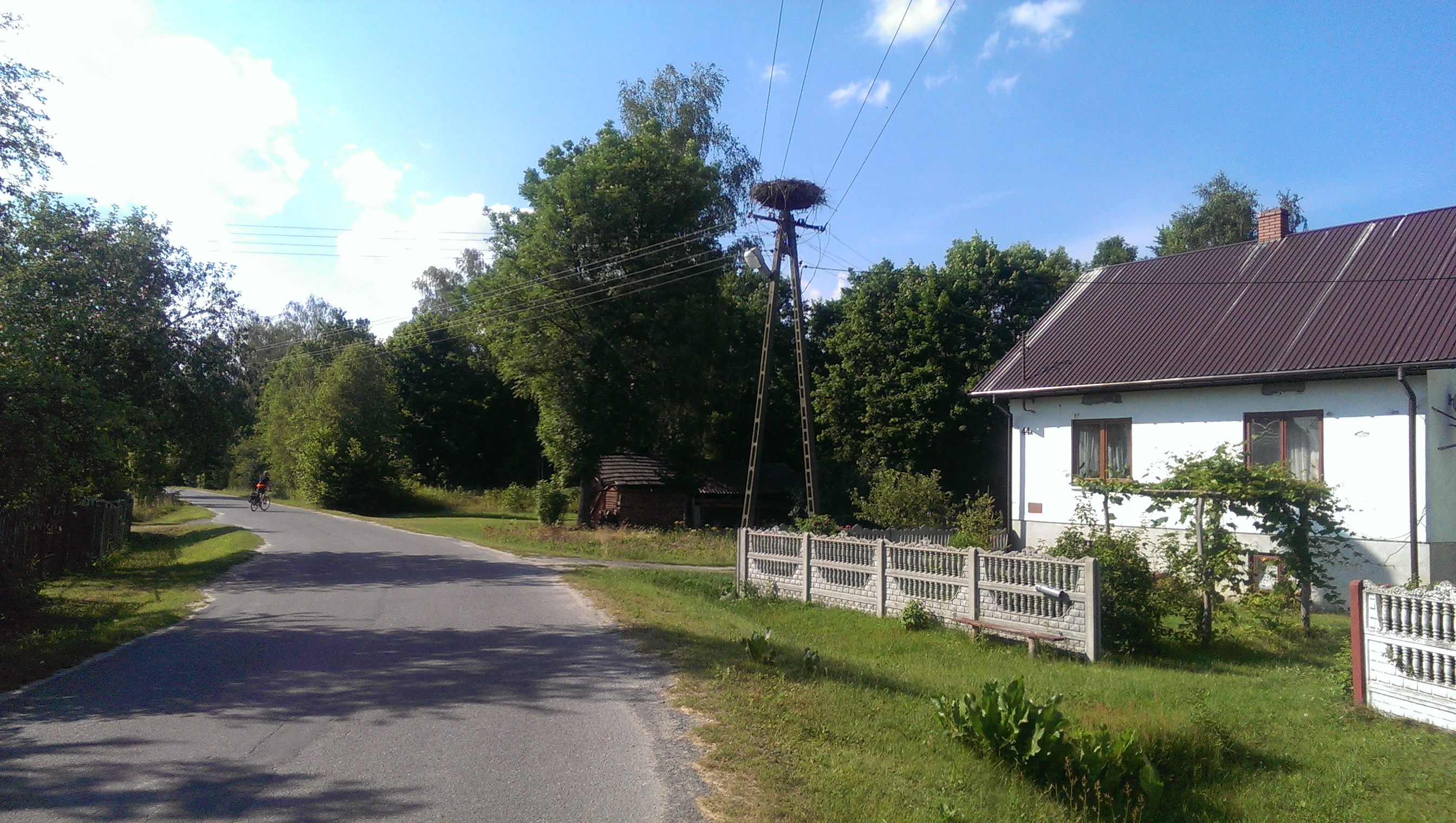

- Location within Poland
- Coordinates: 50°26′25″N 22°41′9″E
- Country: Poland
- Voivodeship: Lublin
- County: Biłgoraj
- Gmina: Księżpol

Population
  - Total: 218

Zynie [ˈzɨɲɛ] is a village in the administrative district of Gmina Księżpol, within Biłgoraj County, Lublin Voivodeship, in eastern Poland.
