= Rakówka, Lublin Voivodeship =

Rakówka
- Village
- Location within Poland
- Coordinates: 50°24′40″N 22°48′24″E
- Country: Poland
- Voivodeship: Lublin
- County: Biłgoraj
- Gmina: Księżpol

Population
  - Total: 541

Rakówka [raˈkufka] is a village in the administrative district of Gmina Księżpol, within Biłgoraj County, Lublin Voivodeship, in eastern Poland.

== Notable residents ==
- Urszula Kozioł (born 1931), poet and writer, 2024 Nike Award winner
