= Telikały =

- Village
- Location within Poland
- Coordinates: 50°28′13″N 22°42′01″E
- Country: Poland
- Voivodeship: Lublin
- County: Biłgoraj
- Gmina: Księżpol

Telikały [tɛliˈkawɨ] is a village in the administrative district of Gmina Księżpol, within Biłgoraj County, Lublin Voivodeship, in eastern Poland.
