= Przymiarki, Biłgoraj County =

Przymiarki
- Village
- Location within Poland
- Coordinates: 50°24′54″N 22°46′36″E
- Country: Poland
- Voivodeship: Lublin
- County: Biłgoraj
- Gmina: Księżpol

Population
  - Total: 212

Przymiarki [pʂɨˈmjarki] is a village in the administrative district of Gmina Księżpol, within Biłgoraj County, Lublin Voivodeship, in eastern Poland.
