= Korchów Drugi =

- Village
- Location within Poland
- Coordinates: 50°22′8″N 22°49′25″E
- Country: Poland
- Voivodeship: Lublin
- County: Biłgoraj
- Gmina: Księżpol

Population
  - Total: 266

Korchów Drugi [ˈkɔrxuf ˈdruɡi] is a village in the administrative district of Gmina Księżpol, within Biłgoraj County, Lublin Voivodeship, in eastern Poland.
