= Zawadka, Lublin Voivodeship =

Zawadka
- Village
- Location within Poland
- Coordinates: 50°24′7″N 22°49′2″E
- Country: Poland
- Voivodeship: Lublin
- County: Biłgoraj
- Gmina: Księżpol

Population
  - Total: 236

Zawadka [zaˈvatka] is a village in the administrative district of Gmina Księżpol, within Biłgoraj County, Lublin Voivodeship, in eastern Poland.
