= Kuchy-Kolonia =

Kucły-Kolonia
- Village
- Location within Poland
- Coordinates: 50°25′16″N 22°49′08″E
- Country: Poland
- Voivodeship: Lublin
- County: Biłgoraj
- Gmina: Księżpol

Kucły-Kolonia [ˈkuc'wɨ kɔˈlɔɲa] is distant outskirt (term: "colony" in Polish) of Rakówka village in the administrative district of Gmina Księżpol, within Biłgoraj County, Lublin Voivodeship, in eastern Poland.
