= Marianka, Biłgoraj County =

Marianka
- Village
- Location within Poland
- Coordinates: 50°24′N 22°46′E
- Country: Poland
- Voivodeship: Lublin
- County: Biłgoraj
- Gmina: Księżpol

Marianka [maˈrjaŋka] is a village in the administrative district of Gmina Księżpol, within Biłgoraj County, Lublin Voivodeship, in eastern Poland.
