= Korchów Pierwszy =

- Village
- Location within Poland
- Coordinates: 50°22′39″N 22°46′57″E
- Country: Poland
- Voivodeship: Lublin
- County: Biłgoraj
- Gmina: Księżpol

Population
  - Total: 750

Korchów Pierwszy [ˈkɔrxuf ˈpjɛrfʂɨ] is a village in the administrative district of Gmina Księżpol, within Biłgoraj County, Lublin Voivodeship, in eastern Poland.
