= Rogale, Lublin Voivodeship =

Rogale
- Village
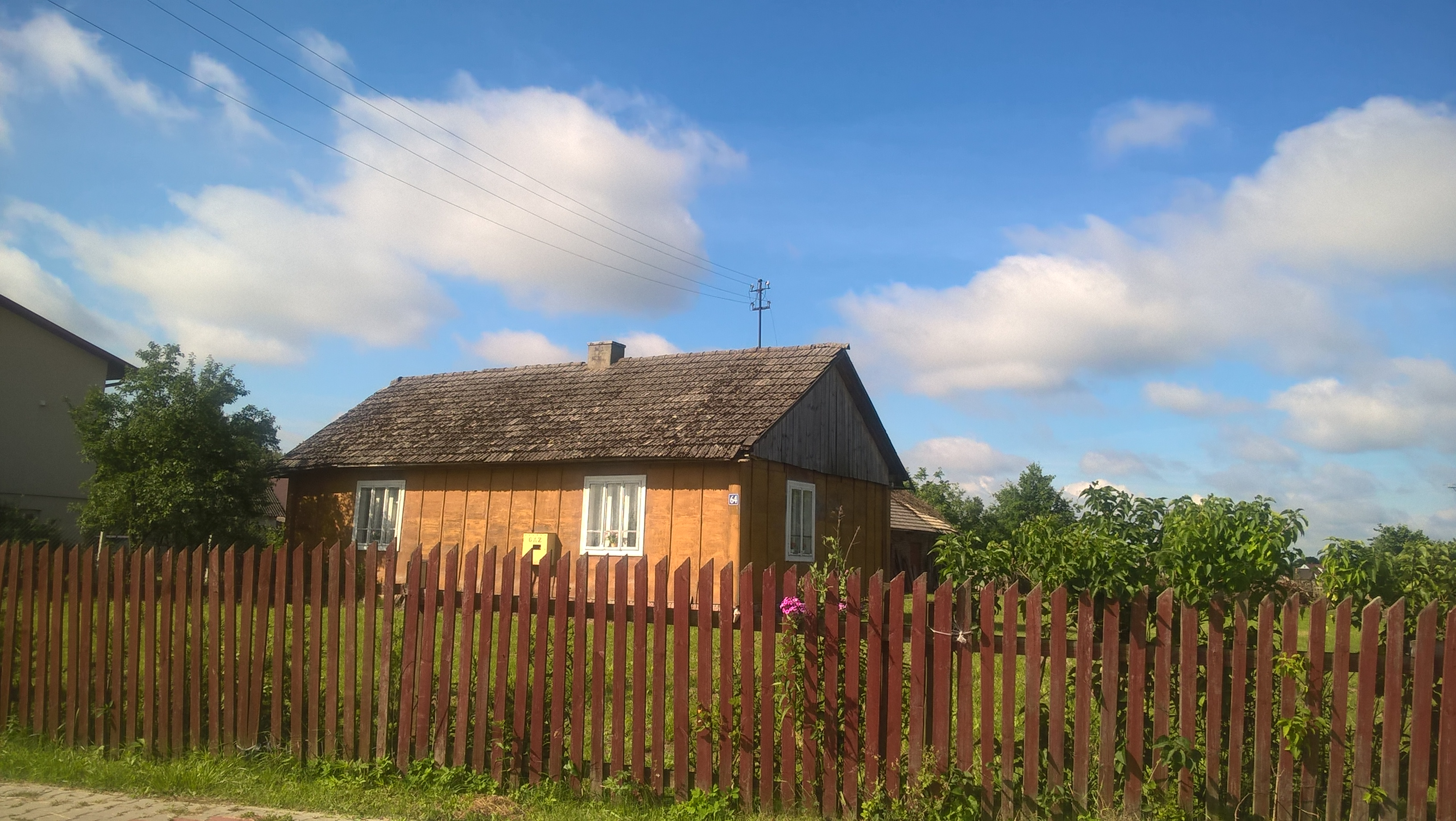

- Location within Poland
- Coordinates: 50°28′33″N 22°43′44″E
- Country: Poland
- Voivodeship: Lublin
- County: Biłgoraj
- Gmina: Księżpol

Population
  - Total: 388
- Time zone: UTC+1 (CET)
  - Summer (DST): UTC+2 (CEST)

Rogale [rɔˈɡalɛ] is a village in the administrative district of Gmina Księżpol, within Biłgoraj County, Lublin Voivodeship, in eastern Poland.

== History ==
Four Polish citizens were murdered by Nazi Germany in the village during World War II.
