= Księżpol =

- Village
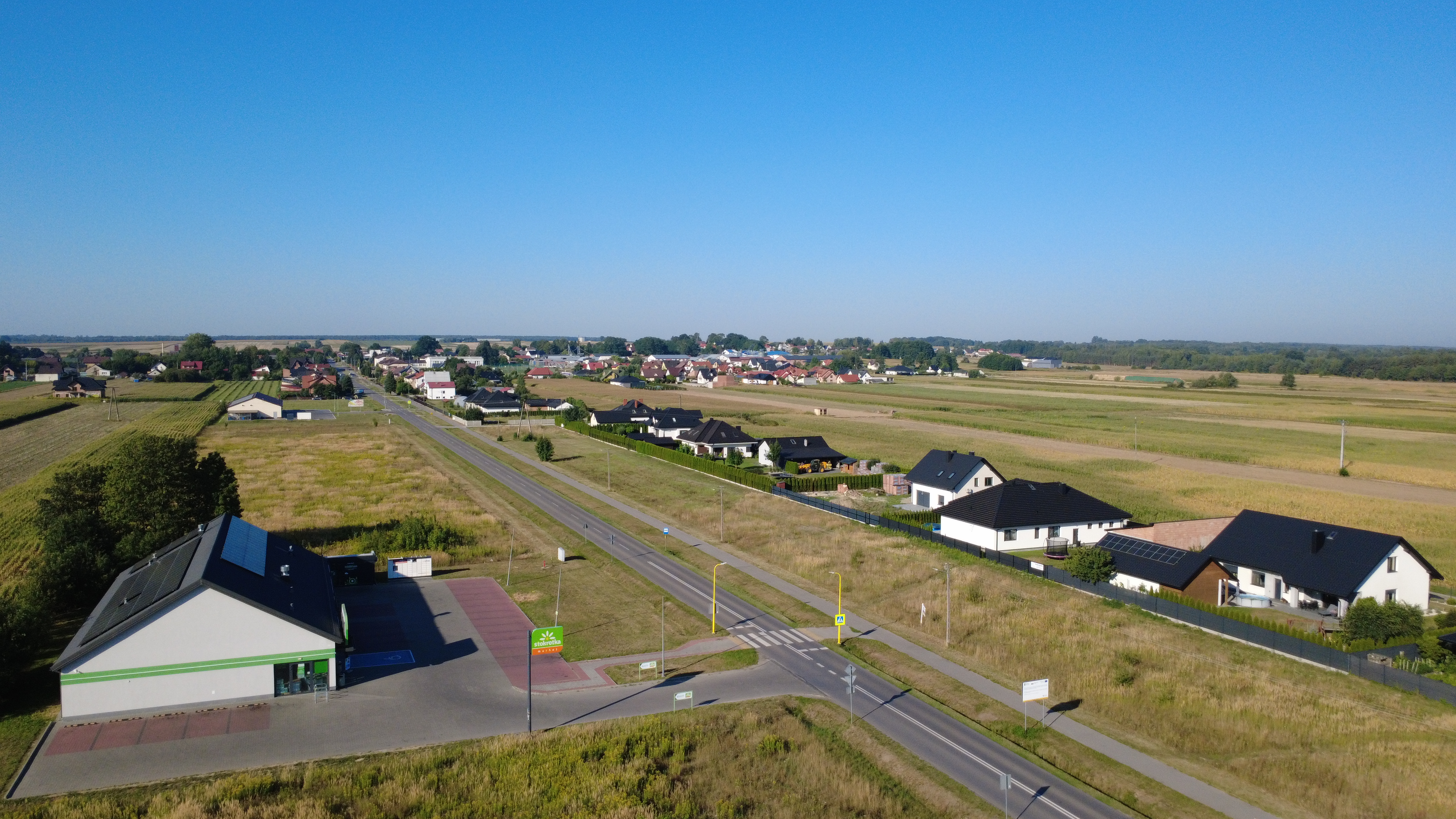
- A panoramic view of Księżpol

- Location within Poland
- Coordinates: 50°25′N 22°44′E
- Country: Poland
- Voivodeship: Lublin
- County: Biłgoraj
- Gmina: Księżpol

Population
  - Total: 1,217

Księżpol [ˈkɕɛ̃ʂpɔl] is a village in Biłgoraj County, Lublin Voivodeship, in eastern Poland. It is the seat of the gmina (administrative district) called Gmina Księżpol.
