= Stary Lipowiec =

- Village
- Location within Poland
- Coordinates: 50°27′15″N 22°50′12″E
- Country: Poland
- Voivodeship: Lublin
- County: Biłgoraj
- Gmina: Księżpol

Population
  - Total: 200

Stary Lipowiec [ˈstarɨ liˈpɔvjɛt͡s] is a village in the administrative district of Gmina Księżpol, within Biłgoraj County, Lublin Voivodeship, in eastern Poland.
