= Karolina Juszczykowska =

Polish Righteous Among the Nations

- Born: 1 July 1898; Budkowo, Poland
- Died: 9 January 1945 (aged 46); Frankfurt, Germany
- Cause of death: Execution by guillotine
- Children: Bronisława Juszczykowska (born 1924)
- Honours: Righteous Among the Nations, Called by Name

Karolina Juszczykowska (1 July 1898 – 9 January 1945) was a Polish worker in the kitchen division of Organisation Todt who was executed for hiding two Jews during The Holocaust. She was posthumously recognized as Righteous Among the Nations in 2011 and by Called by Name project in 2020.

== Life ==
Karolina Juszczykowska was born on 1 July 1898 in Budkowo, Poland. She lived with her parents until she was 13, before moving to Germany where she worked for the next 5 years on a farm in Mecklenburg.

Five years later, she returned to Poland to live with her sister, staying with her until 1934. Before the start of World War II she was employed in road construction, afterwards she worked odd jobs throughout the war: first as a laundress, then a maid and finally for the kitchen division of Organisation Todt in Tomaszów Mazowiecki.

Juszczykowska said that she had met two Jewish men, named Janek and Paweł, who asked her to shelter them. She agreed, and let them hide in her house from the Nazis, where they lived in the basement and slept on the floor to avoid being seen. Six weeks later a raid followed, the two men were killed and Juszczykowska was brought into custody. Her twenty-year-old daughter, Bronisława, was conscripted into forced labor and sent to Germany.

In August 1944, she was sent to prison to await her trial. Two weeks later, her trial was held and the Piotrkow Sondergericht courts gave Juszczykowska a death sentence. The judges of the court believed that her sentence was pointless as all the Jews in the area had already been deported or killed. Recommending pardoning her they wrote, "It therefore seems to the court that the crime of the accused is not so grave as to justify her execution, especially in view of the fact that this sentence will not deter others.”

The request from the judges was denied and she was executed on 9 January 1945 at the Preungesheim prison in Frankfurt, Germany. In May 2011, she was recognized as Righteous Among the Nations by Yad Vashem and a plaque was dedicated to Juszczykowska near her apartment in 2020.
