= Sklodowska =

Sklodowska may refer to:

- Polish feminine form of the surname Skłodowski
  - The surname of Maria Skłodowska-Curie (for further information see Marie Curie), a Polish chemist
- Sklodowska (lunar crater), a crater on the Moon
- Sklodowska (Martian crater), a crater on Mars
- Skłodowska Polish title of the British film Radioactive

== See also ==
- Skłodowska (disambiguation)
