= Bukowiec, Lublin Voivodeship =

Bukowiec
- Village
- Location within Poland
- Coordinates: 50°26′53.02″N 22°42′12.26″E
- Country: Poland
- Voivodeship: Lublin
- County: Biłgoraj
- Gmina: Księżpol

Bukowiec [buˈkɔvjɛt͡s] is a village in the administrative district of Gmina Księżpol, within Biłgoraj County, Lublin Voivodeship, in eastern Poland.
