= Kamionka, Biłgoraj County =

Kamionka
- Village
- Location within Poland
- Coordinates: 50°23′51″N 22°43′14″E
- Country: Poland
- Voivodeship: Lublin
- County: Biłgoraj
- Gmina: Księżpol

Population
  - Total: 12

Kamionka [kaˈmjɔnka] is a village in the administrative district of Gmina Księżpol, within Biłgoraj County, Lublin Voivodeship, in eastern Poland.
