= Guty-Bujno =

- Village
- Location within Poland
- Coordinates: 52°51′16″N 22°01′47″E
- Country: Poland
- Voivodeship: Masovian
- County: Ostrów
- Gmina: Ostrów Mazowiecka

Guty-Bujno [ˈɡutɨ ˈbui̯nɔ] is a village in the administrative district of Gmina Ostrów Mazowiecka, within Ostrów County, Masovian Voivodeship, in east-central Poland.
