= Zanie, Lublin Voivodeship =

Zanie
- Village
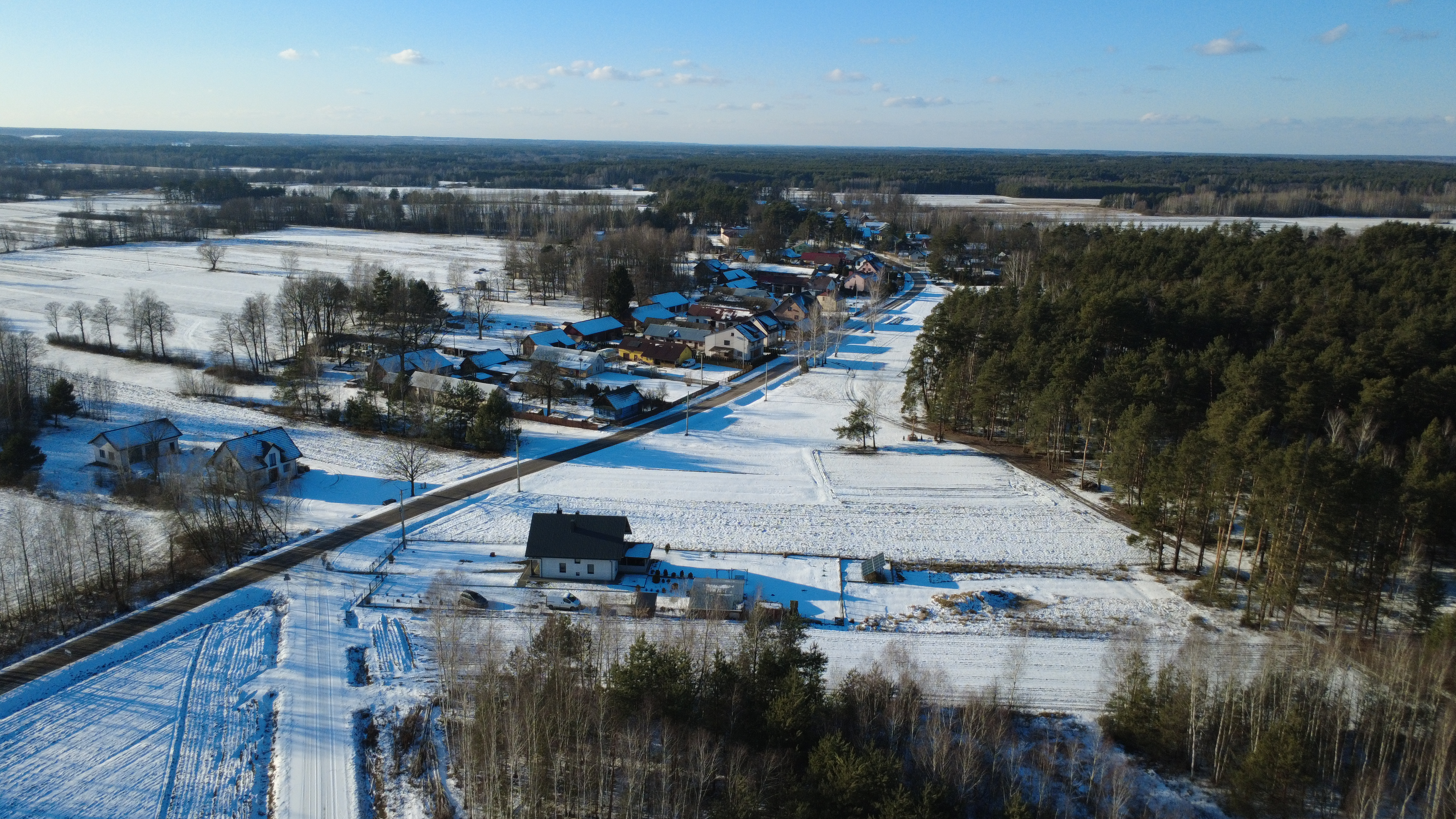
- A panoramic view of Zanie
- Interactive map of Zanie
- Location within Poland
- Coordinates: 50°27′11″N 22°41′10″E
- Country: Poland
- Voivodeship: Lublin
- County: Biłgoraj
- Gmina: Księżpol

Population (2021)
  - Total: 58
- Postal code: 23-415

Zanie [ˈzaɲɛ] is a village in the administrative district of Gmina Księżpol, within Biłgoraj County, Lublin Voivodeship, in eastern Poland.
