= Jan Maletka =

Polish railway worker (1921–1942)

Jan Maletka (1921–1942) was a Polish railway worker. On 20 August 1942 he was murdered by the Germans for providing water to Jews being transported to the Treblinka concentration camp. On 26 November 2021, as a part of the Called by Name project, a plaque commemorating him has been revealed at the Treblinka railway station, which has sparked a controversy among some Jewish activists in Poland. Polish philosopher, Jewish activist and left-wing politician Jan Hartman explained that while history of Maletka is true, according to him specifically at the Treblinka ramp local Poles were cynically selling water to Jews, while Maletka provided it for free and his heroism should be recognized but not at the ramp. The plaque commemorating Jan Maletka was placed at the place where he was killed, and during the ceremony the memory of all victims of Treblinka camps was honored.
