= Gmina Księżpol =

Gmina Księżpol Księżpol Commune
- Gmina
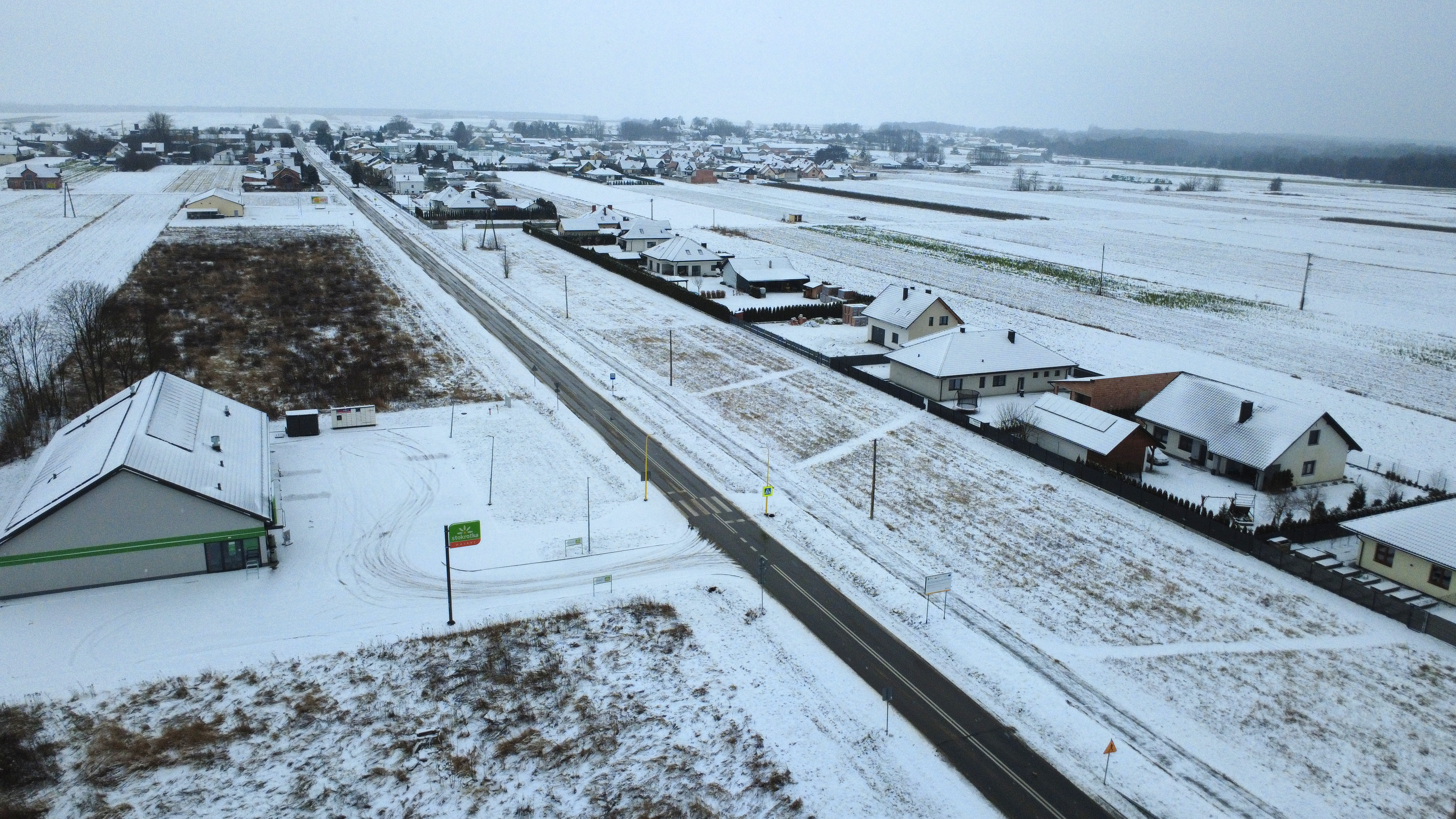
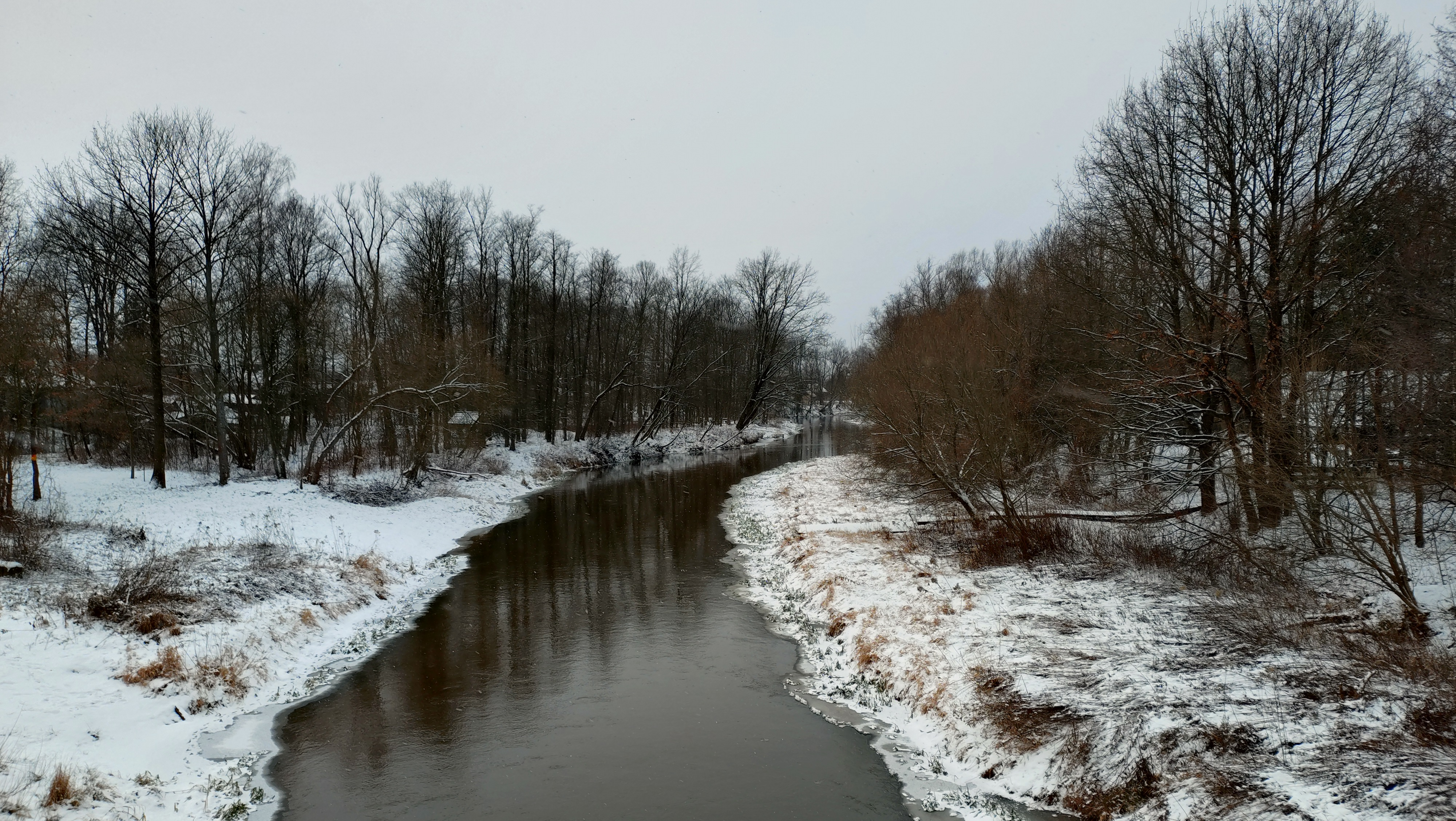
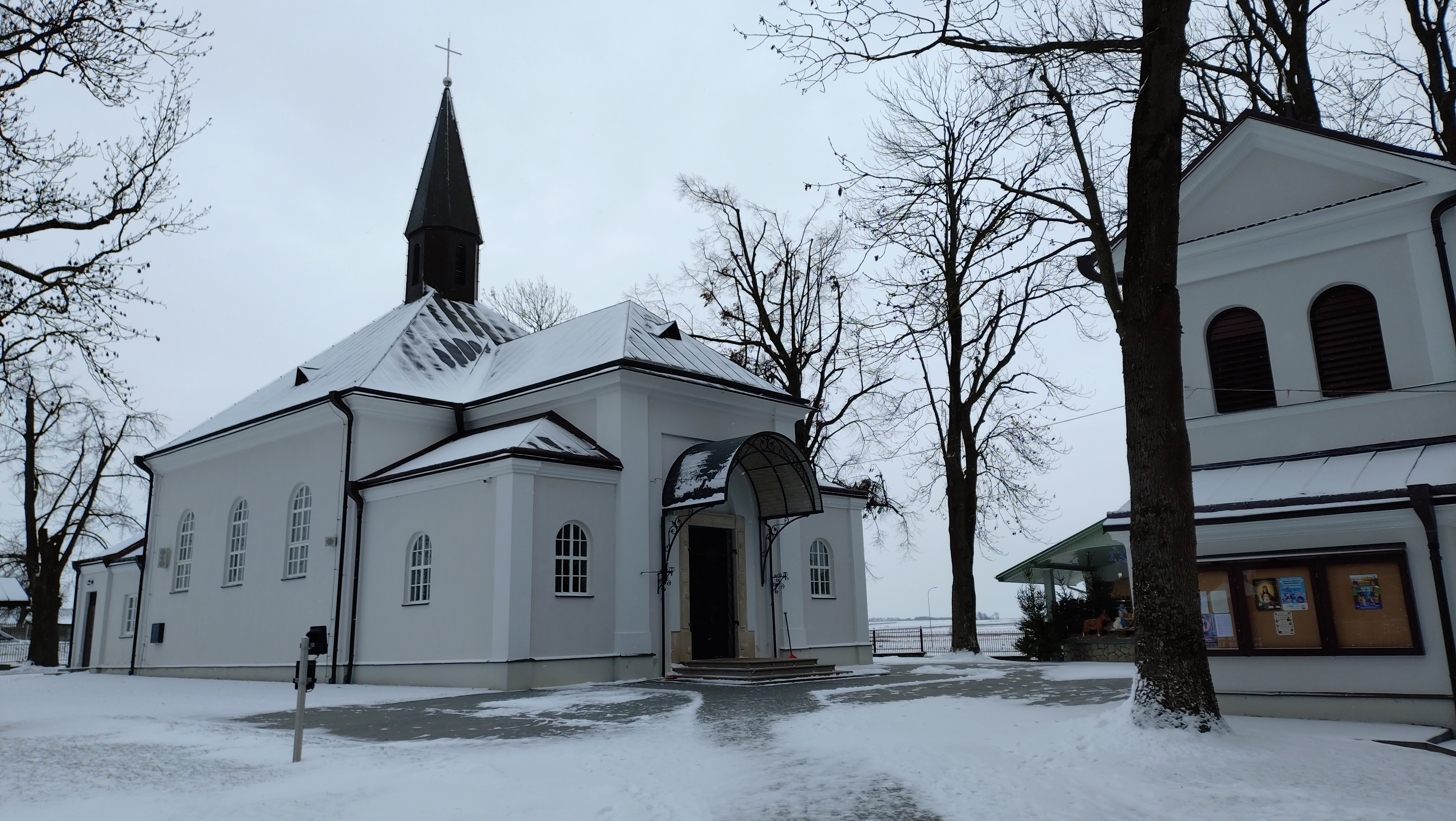
- A panoramic view of Księżpol Tanew river Exaltation of the Holy Cross Church

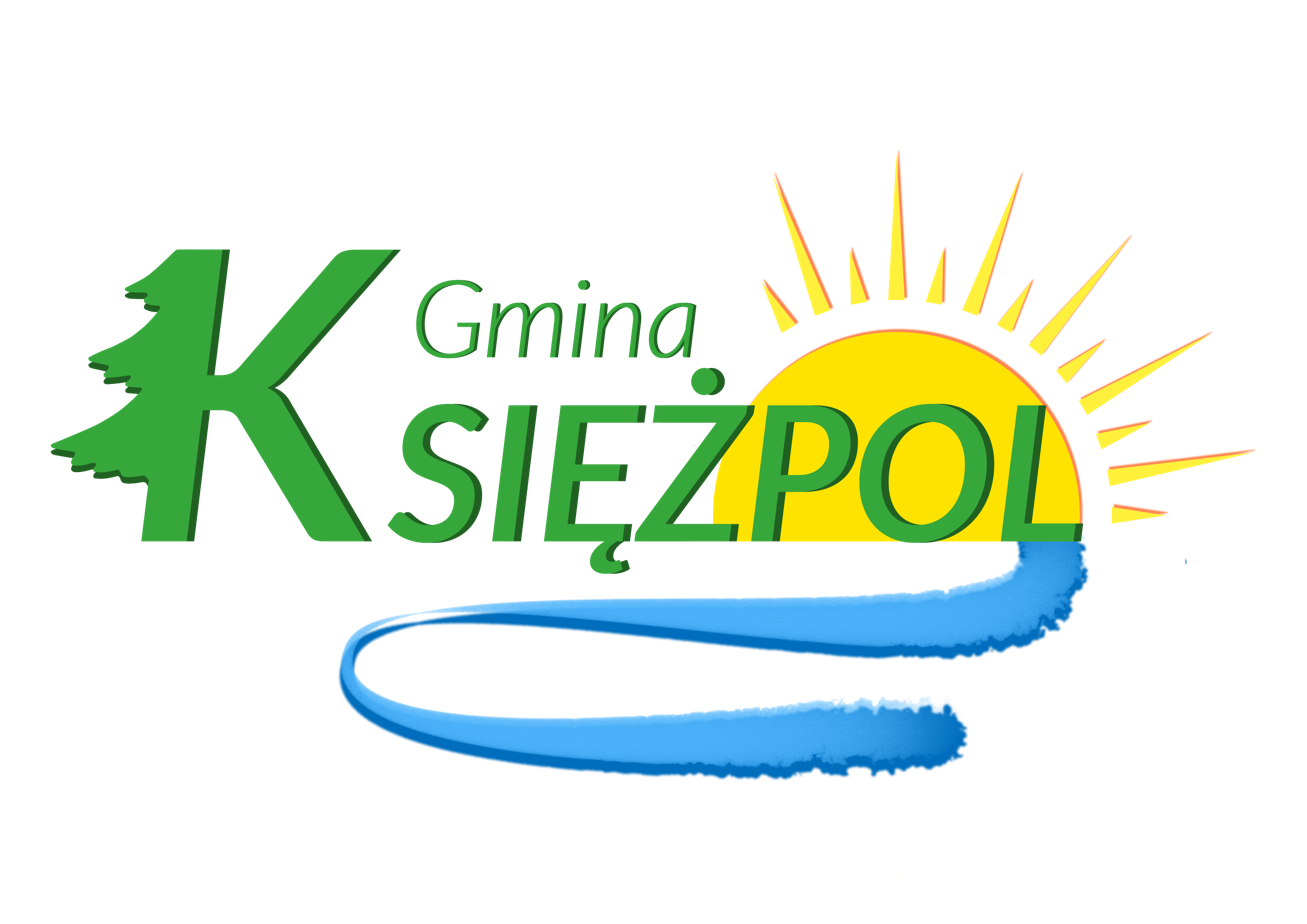
- Brandmark

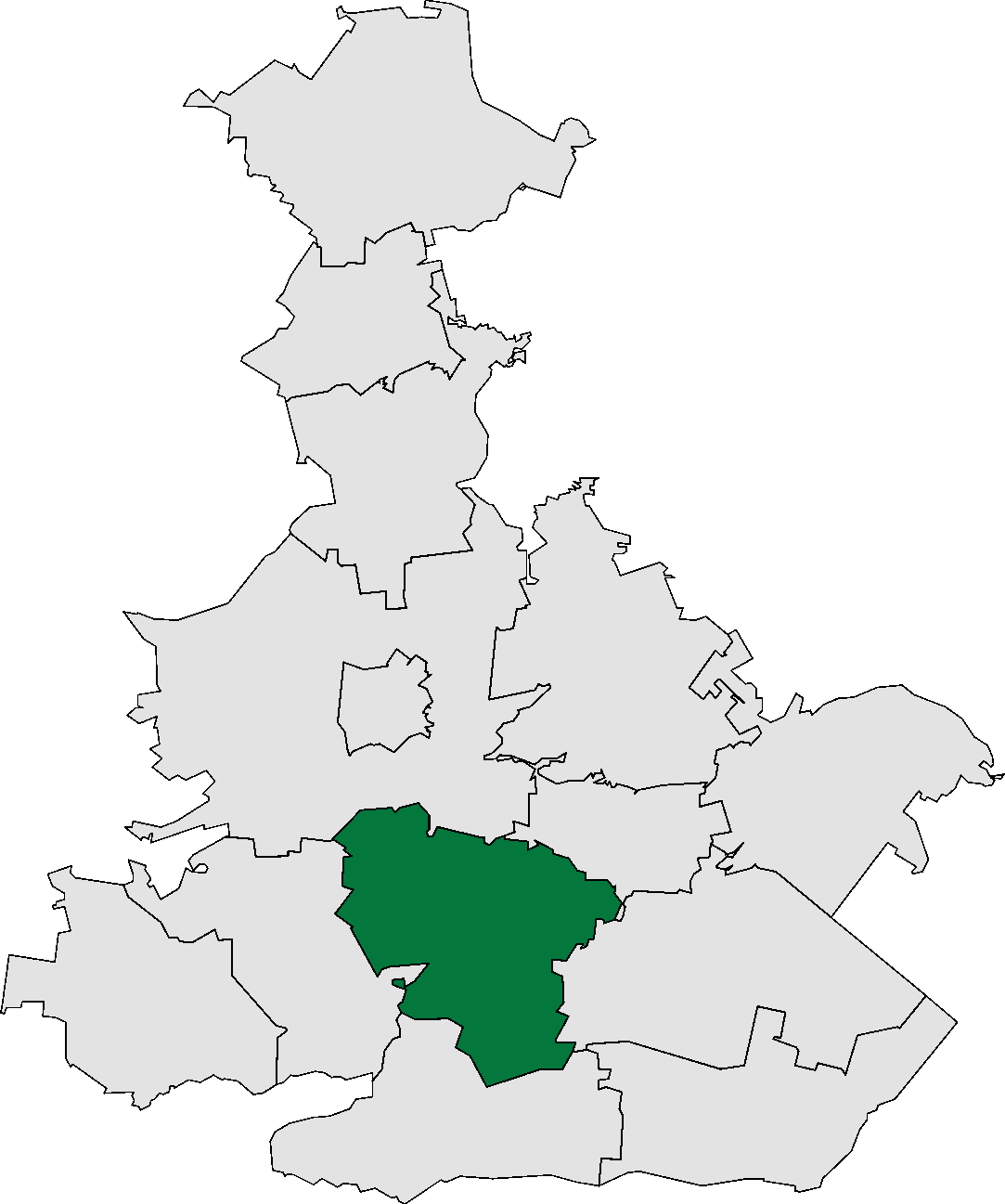
- Location within the county

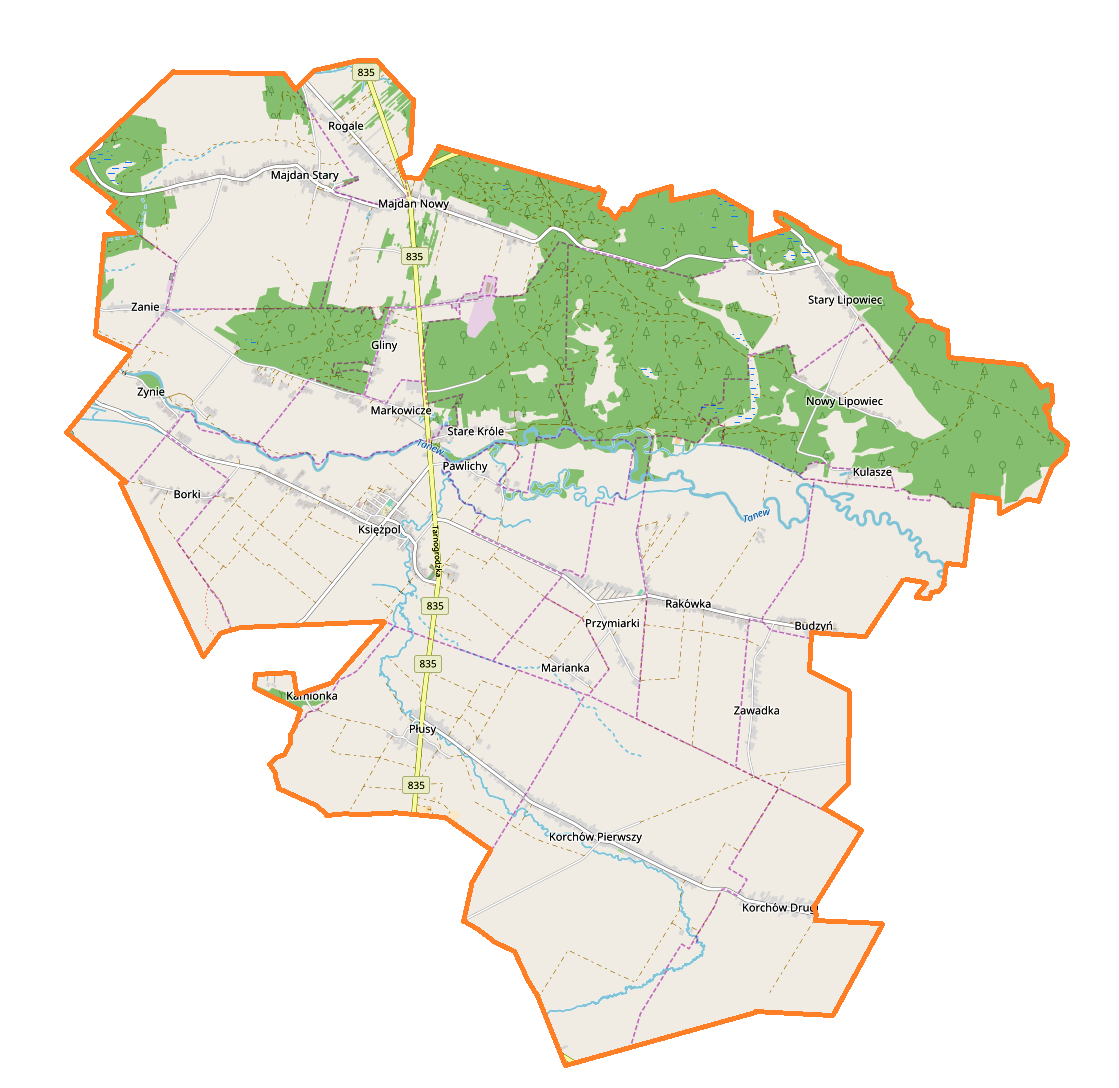
- Gmina's Map
- Coordinates (Księżpol): 50°25′23″N 22°44′7″E
- Country: Poland
- Voivodeship: Lublin
- County: Biłgoraj
- Seat: Księżpol

Government
  - Wójt: Jarosław Piskorski

Area
  - Total: 141.28 km^{2} (54.55 sq mi)

Population (2025)
  - Total: 6,577
  - Density: 46.55/km^{2} (120.6/sq mi)
- Postal code: 23-414 to 23-415
- Website: https://ksiezpol.pl/

Gmina Księżpol is located in the southern part of Biłgoraj County in the Lublin Voivodeship. It covers an area of 142.36 square kilometers (54.55 sq mi) and is a primarily agricultural region. It comprises 23 villages, which are organized into 17 sołectwo (village administrative units).

== History ==
The history of Księżpol dates back to the Middle Ages, when it was founded in the vast forests of the Solska Forest (Puszcza Solska), which at that time stretched along the Tanew river and was part of the Krzeszów district. At the end of the 16th century, along with its surrounding lands, it was incorporated into the Zamoyski family entail (Ordynacja Zamojska), where it soon became the center of a group of estates that included nearby villages, forest settlements in the Solska Forest, and mill settlements along the Tanew river.

== Geography ==
Gmina Księżpol borders Gmina Biłgoraj to the north, Gmina Aleksandrów and Gmina Łukowa to the east, Gmina Tarnogród to the south, and Gmina Biszcza to the west.

Tanew is the largest river in the area. It is one of the few rivers in Poland and Europe that has not been subject to riverbed regulation. The river has eroded parts of the terrain, exposing tree roots along the banks. A section of the Tanew river near the village of Stare Króle, called “Jaskółczy Brzeg” (Swallow’s Bank), is part of the “Młodzie” nature and recreation trail. The name refers to the bank swallow (Riparia riparia), which nests in burrows it digs into the steep, sandy riverbanks.

Złota Nitka is another river that flows through the area, it is a tributary of the Tanew.

== Villages ==
Gmina Księżpol contains the villages and settlements of Borki, Budzyń, Bukowiec, Gliny, Kamionka, Korchów Drugi, Korchów Pierwszy, Księżpol, Kuchy-Kolonia, Kulasze, Marianka, Markowicze, Markowicze-Cegielnia, Nowy Lipowiec, Nowy Majdan, Pawlichy, Płusy, Przymiarki, Rakówka, Rogale, Stare Króle, Stary Lipowiec, Stary Majdan, Telikały, Zanie, Zawadka and Zynie.

Village populations according to the 2021 Polish census
Rank	Name	Population	Men	Women
1	Księżpol	1,217	596	621
2	Majdan Nowy	697	350	347
3	Majdan Stary	674	339	335
4	Korchów Pierwszy	630	314	316
5	Płusy	453	217	236
6	Rakówka	436	223	213
7	Rogale	397	202	195
8	Zawadka	362	185	177
9	Markowicze	309	156	153
10	Korchów Drugi	248	128	120
11	Zynie	203	92	111
12	Przymiarki	200	107	93
13	Stare Króle	179	89	90
14	Stary Lipowiec	166	96	70
15	Nowy Lipowiec	107	50	57
16	Borki	97	48	49
17	Zanie	58	28	30

== Demographics ==
Historical population
Year	Population	Men	Women
2025	6,577	3,301	3,276
2024	6,651	3,337	3,314
2023	6,703	3,366	3,337
2022	6,713	3,363	3,350
2021	6,731	3,373	3,358
2020	6,807	3,405	3,402
2019	6,888	3,448	3,440
2018	6,930	3,472	3,458
2017	6,956	3,474	3,482
2016	6,962	3,476	3,486
2015	6,917	3,470	3,447
2014	6,891	3,455	3,436
2013	6,899	3,458	3,441
2012	6,886	3,442	3,444
2011	6,851	3,435	3,416
2010	6,872	3,440	3,432
2009	6,791	3,407	3,384
2008	6,757	3,370	3,387
2007	6,749	3,366	3,383
2006	6,784	3,381	3,403
2005	6,797	3,398	3,399
2004	6,806	3,412	3,394
2003	6,796	3,419	3,377
2002	6,760	3,405	3,355
2001	6,793	3,438	3,355
2000	6,791	3,452	3,339
1999	6,764	3,440	3,324
1998	6,836	3,482	3,354
1997	6,802	3,449	3,353
1996	6,741	3,426	3,315
1995	6,746	3,430	3,316

== Economy ==
Agricultural land makes up 70% of the region's area, and forests cover 23%. The main crops include cereals (including corn for grain), rapeseed, potatoes, strawberries, raspberries, black currants, and a variety of vegetables such as cucumbers, green beans, cabbage, garlic, and broccoli. Tobacco is also grown in the region.

Local businesses operate in the construction, timber, transport, service, and agricultural/food processing sectors.

The area offers a variety of recreational activities, such as cycling and kayaking. In recent years, agritourism has seen significant and rapid development.

== Landmarks ==
The Church of the Exaltation of the Holy Cross was constructed between 1856 and 1858 with funds from Konstanty Zamoyski. Earlier, there had been a wooden Uniate church, which was dismantled in 1858. In its place stands an old stone Uniate cross. In 1875, the church was converted into an Orthodox church, and in 1917, it was handed over to the Catholics.

Near the church, there is an old cemetery with a Soldier's Mound from World War I and graves of soldiers who died during the Invasion of Poland.

The St. Peter and St. Paul's Church is a wooden parish church built between 1903 and 1906 as an Orthodox church, on the site of the previous Greek-Catholic church. According to the records of the Zamoyski family entail, the earlier church was constructed in 1791.

A historic manor called "Rządcówka" constructed around 1870, is a brick building that served as the administrative office of Księżpol. Located in Majdan Nowy, it is linked to the Zamoyski family entail. In front of the building, on the right side, there is an old statue of St. John of Nepomuk, the patron saint of the weavers from Biłgoraj.

== Local referendum ==
January 13th, 2013, residents of Gmina Księżpol voted in a local referendum on whether to split the gmina and create a new one called Majdan Stary.

The proposed new gmina would have included nine villages in the northern part of Księżpol: Majdan Nowy, Majdan Stary, Rogale, Stary Lipowiec, Nowy Lipowiec, Kulasze, Cegielnia – Markowicze, Gliny and Zanie.

The initiators argued that this northern part had been neglected in terms of investment and services (such as drainage, preschool access, sports facilities).

Out of about 5,429 eligible voters, 1,560 participated — that's a turnout of 28.73%. Of the 1,521 valid votes, 1,351 were in favor of establishing the new gmina.

However, the referendum was declared invalid because turnout did not reach the required minimum of 30%.
