= Gliny, Biłgoraj County =

Gliny
- Village
- Location within Poland
- Coordinates: 50°26′55″N 22°44′6″E
- Country: Poland
- Voivodeship: Lublin
- County: Biłgoraj
- Gmina: Księżpol

Population
  - Total: 45

Gliny [ˈɡlinɨ] is a village in the administrative district of Gmina Księżpol, within Biłgoraj County, Lublin Voivodeship, in eastern Poland.
