= Majdan Nowy, Biłgoraj County =

Majdan Nowy
- Village
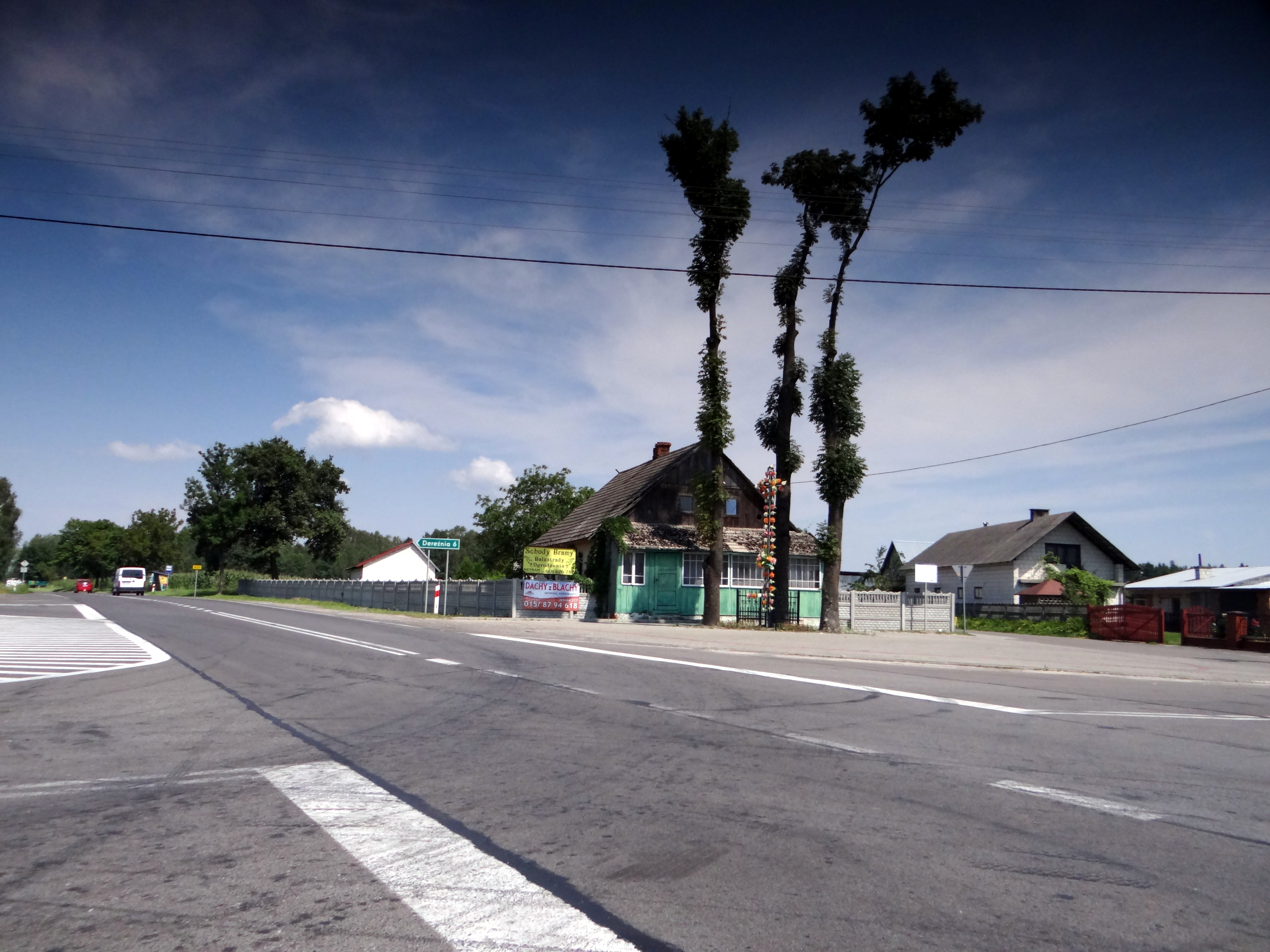
- Road through the village

- Location within Poland
- Coordinates: 50°28′9″N 22°43′36″E
- Country: Poland
- Voivodeship: Lublin
- County: Biłgoraj
- Gmina: Księżpol

Population
  - Total: 593

Majdan Nowy (Polish pronunciation: [ˈmajdan ˈnɔvɨ]) is a village in the administrative district of Gmina Księżpol, within Biłgoraj County, Lublin Voivodeship, in eastern Poland.

== History ==
During the Nazi occupation of Poland, on June 24, 1943, from 28 to 36 inhabitants of Majdan Nowy, including women and children, were massacred by the German punitive expedition. The village was partially burned.
