= Leontius Stasievich =

Saint, clergyman of the Russian Orthodox Church

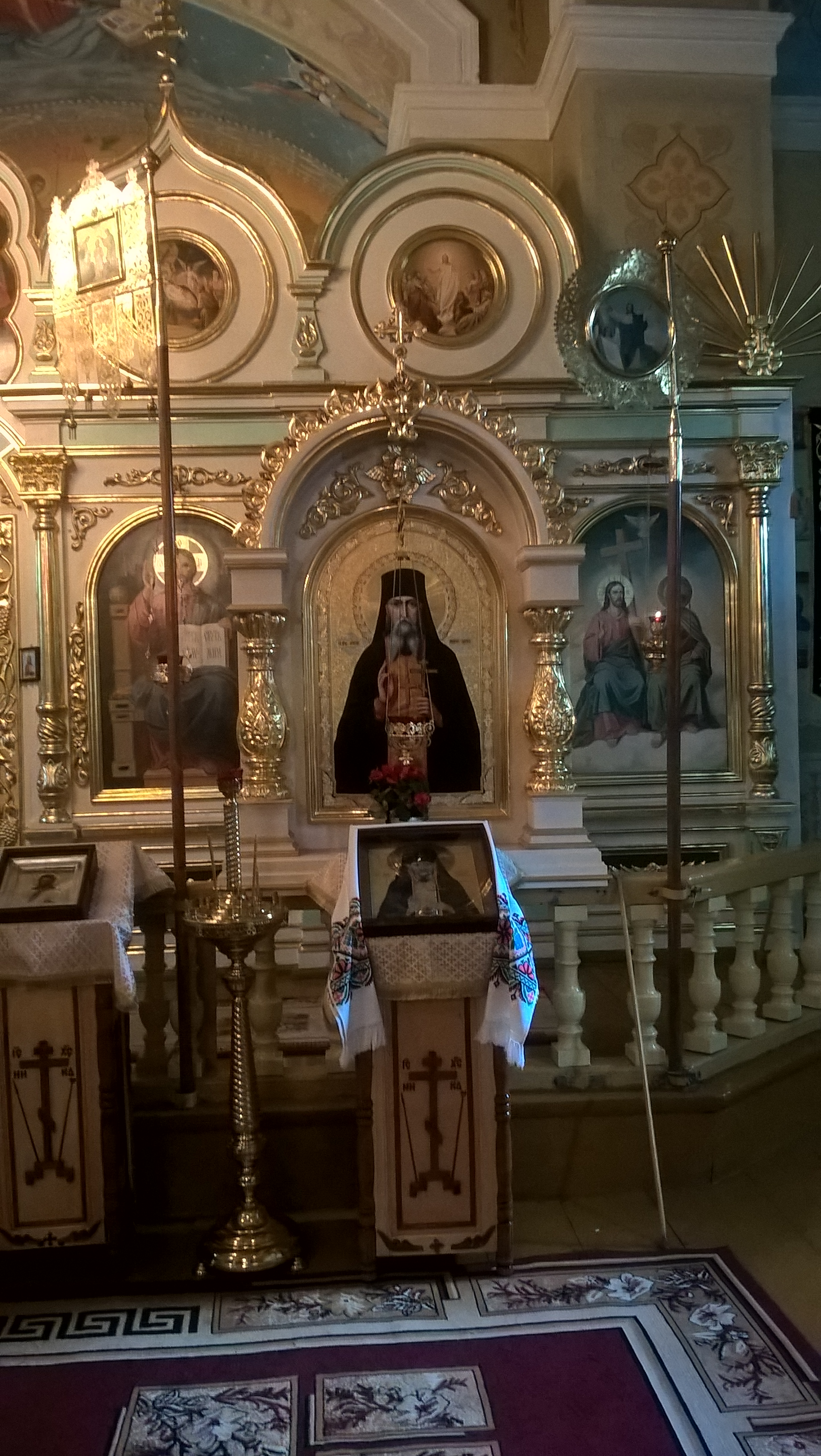
- Icon of Leontius in the church in Tarnogród
- Born: Lew Fomich Stasievich; March 20, 1884; Tarnogród
- Died: February 9, 1972 (aged 87); Mikhaylovskoye
- Burial place: Mikhaylovskoye
- Years active: 1962–1972
- Religion: Eastern Orthodoxy
- Church: Russian Orthodox Church
- Title: Archimandrite

Saint Leontius
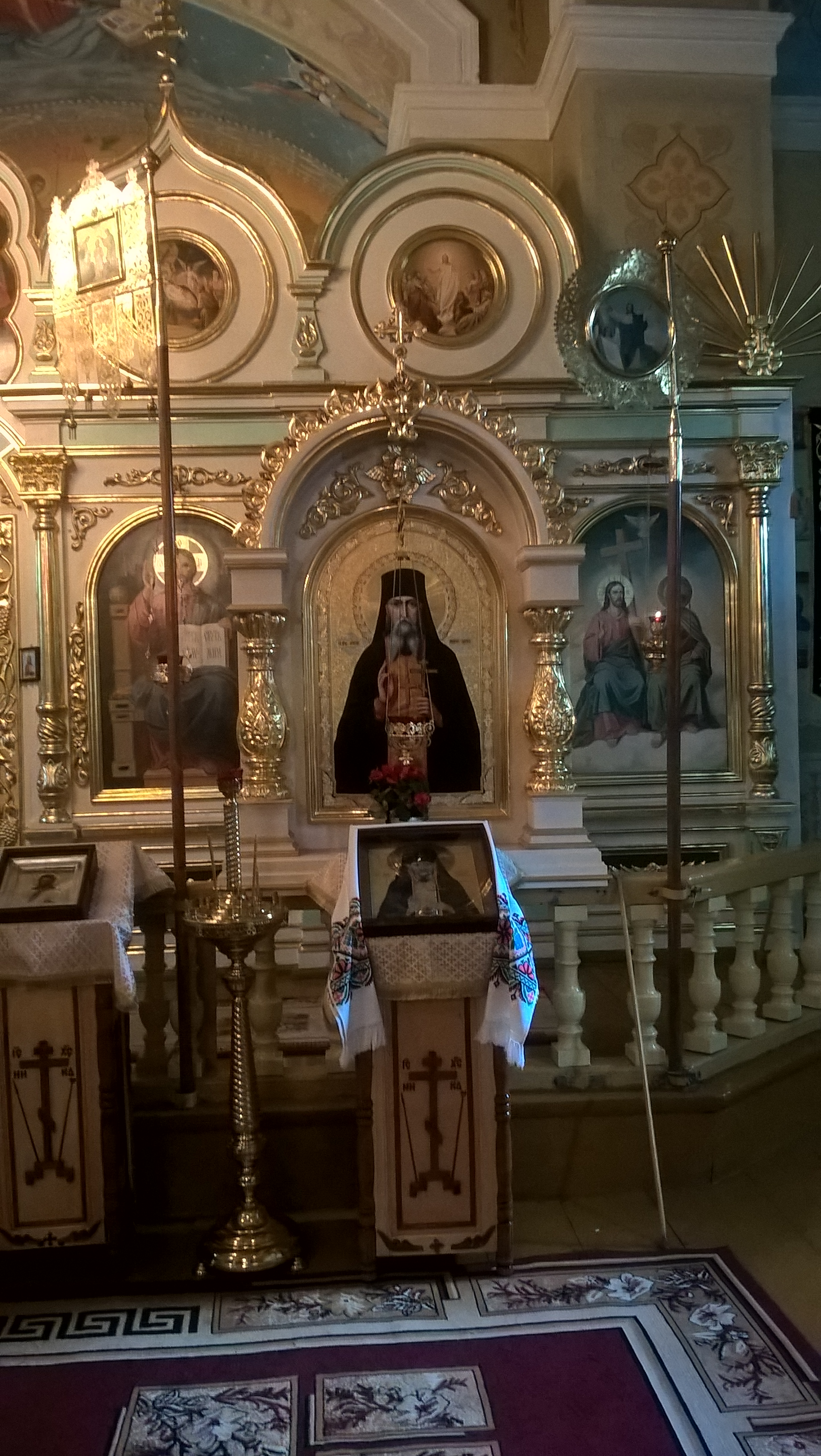

The Venerable
- Honored in: Russian Orthodox Church
- Canonized: 1999 by Russian Orthodox Church
- Major shrine: Tarnogród, Mikhaylovskoye
- Feast: January 28, January 29 (Julian calendar)

Leontius, secular name Lew Fomich Stasievich (born 20 March 1884 in Tarnogród, died 9 February 1972 in Mikhaylovskoye) was a clergyman of the Russian Orthodox Church, archimandrite, one of the New Martyrs and Confessors of the Russian Orthodox Church.

He came from a peasant family in Tarnogród. At the age of 26, he entered the St. Onuphrius Monastery in Jabłeczna, where he also received diaconal and priestly ordinations. In 1915, along with other monks, he went into exile in Moscow. Between 1922 and 1923, he served as the superior of the Transfiguration of the Lord and St. Euthymius of Suzdal Monastery in Suzdal. He then served as a parson in Suzdal, Vorontsov, Mikhaylovskoye, Yelchovtsy, and again in Mikhaylovskoye. He was sentenced three times to labor camp under charges of counter-revolutionary agitation and organizing anti-Soviet associations, spending years in camps between 1930 and 1933, 1935 and 1938, and 1950 and 1955. In 1989, he was posthumously fully rehabilitated.

Recognized during his lifetime as a starets, endowed with the gifts of healing and prophecy, he was canonized by the Russian Orthodox Church with permission for local veneration in the Eparchy of Ivanovo and Voznesensk in 1999; in 2000, this veneration was permitted throughout the Moscow Patriarchate. Archimandrite Leontius is also venerated in the Polish Orthodox Church; the main center of his veneration in Poland is Tarnogród.

== Biography ==
=== Youth ===
He was the only son of Katarzyna and Tomasz Stasievich, deeply religious Orthodox peasant parents living in Tarnogród. His uncle Adam was an Orthodox clergyman and held the rank of protoiereus. As the future clergyman recalled, during his childhood, pilgrims often stayed overnight at their home, telling him about the shrines they visited and the saints honored there. According to Jarosław Charkiewicz, he received his basic education at the local school, and then attended a four-year gymnasium. Another source states that he only studied at a parish school.

At the age of 15, he began working as a clerk at the court in Tarnogród. Six years later, his father died. Despite becoming the sole breadwinner of the family at this point, his mother agreed to him abandoning his job to pursue studies at the Orthodox Theological Seminary in Chełm, so that he could become a priest.

=== Clergyman ===
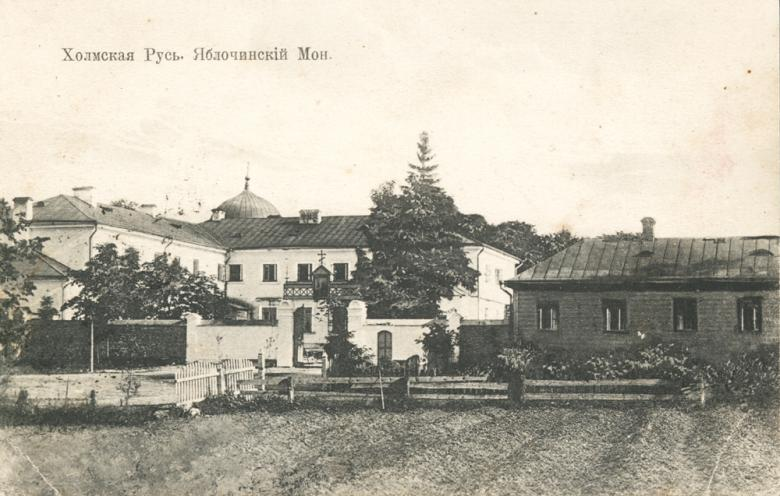
View of the St. Onuphrius Monastery in Jabłeczna at the beginning of the 20th century

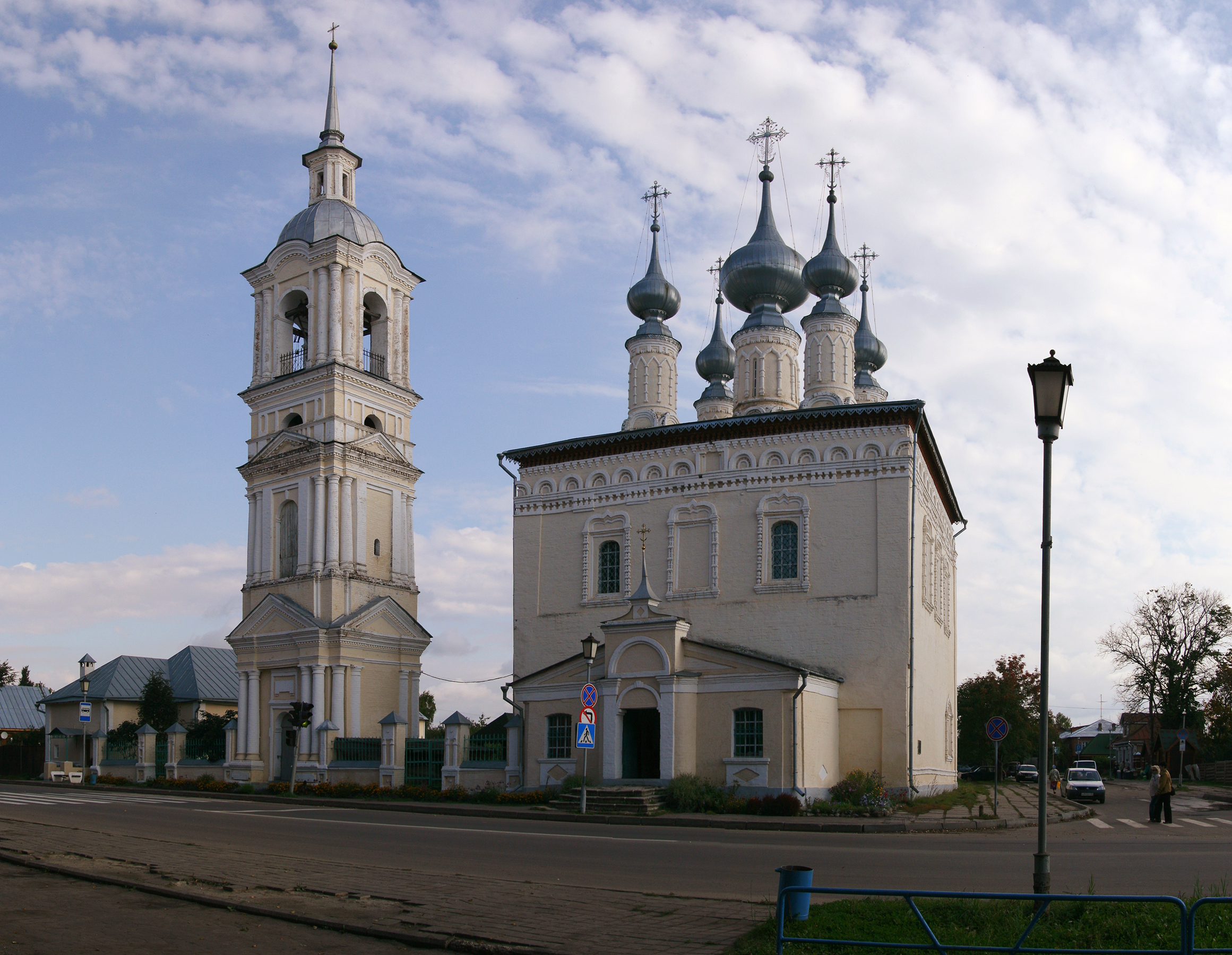
Smolensk Icon of the Mother of God Church in Suzdal, where Archimandrite Leontius served after 1923

On 31 December 1910, he entered the St. Onuphrius Monastery in Jabłeczna as a novice. In 1912, on Great Monday, he took his final monastic vows at this monastery before the superior of the community, Archimandrite Seraphim, and adopted the name Leontius in honor of St. Leontius of Rostov. That same year, his mother died. On 29 October 1912, Bishop Eulogius Georgiyevsky ordained him as a deacon. The following year, on 20 May, the new Bishop of Chełm, Anastasius Gribanovsky, ordained him as a priest. His time at the monastery in Jabłeczna played a significant role in the life of the future saint, who always considered its patron, St. Onuphrius, his special protector.

From 1913 to 1915, he served as the treasurer of the monastery. In 1915, together with all the monks, he fled from the advancing front lines to Moscow, where he initially stayed temporarily and in 1916 was accepted permanently into the Epiphany Monastery. According to some sources, he began studies at the Moscow Theological Academy but, due to its closure in 1919, did not obtain a diploma. Other sources mention that Leontius did indeed pursue studies at a theological school, first a lower institution preparing candidates for the priesthood, and later at the theological seminary in Moscow. However, his education was interrupted in 1919 when the Bolshevik authorities closed the Moscow theological schools. In 1919, he was granted the title of hegumen. The Epiphany Monastery was by then registered as a labor commune to avoid being shut down, with Hegumen Leontius serving as the chairman of the residents' committee.

In November 1922, at the request of Bishop Basil of Suzdal, Hegumen Leontius was transferred to the Monastery of Saint Euthymius in Suzdal. He became the superior of the nearly 100-member community later that same year. He worked to improve the financial situation of the declining monastery, as well as to restore order in the monastic life, including the proper scheduling of services according to the rule. This caused conflicts with the community, as some monks also supported the Renovationism movement. The hegumen was beaten several times by them.

In 1923, the Soviet authorities declared the monastery's closure, but Leontius remained in Suzdal. In 1924, Patriarch Tikhon of Moscow granted him the dignity of archimandrite. Initially, he was the priest of the Smolensk Icon of the Mother of God Parish in Suzdal, and later of the St. John the Theologian Parish in the same city. He served in this capacity until 1930, gaining considerable popularity and respect among the faithful. In 1929, he became involved in protests by the faithful against the decision to close the cathedral in Suzdal.

=== Arrest and time in the Gulag ===
In 1930, he was arrested by the Joint State Political Directorate on charges of conducting counter-revolutionary, anti-Soviet activities. The immediate cause of his arrest was violating the regulations prohibiting church bell ringing. Along with him, 31 other clergy and people associated with the church were imprisoned. The accused were specifically charged with organizing a group of "fanatical women", including former nuns, who were involved in collecting money for the exiled Bishop Gregory and caused "excesses" when the Suzdal Cathedral was closed. Archimandrite Leontius was also accused of using quotes from the Holy Scriptures to argue for the imminent fall of the Soviet Union. The clergyman did not confess to the charges and was sentenced to three years in a labor camp in the Komi Republic, where he worked as a medic assisting a brigade of prisoners building a road.

After serving his sentence, he received permission from Bishop Chrysostom of Yuriev-Polski to serve in the village of Borodino. However, after a year of ministry, he was arrested again, accused of conducting religious agitation among children, opposing collectivization, and participating in a secret monarchist organization. The clergyman admitted only to giving small gifts (pens and pencils) to children, as he claimed he did not want them to engage in hooligan behavior. On 15 February 1936, he was sentenced to three more years in a labor camp in Karaganda, where he served as an assistant to the camp doctor. He was frequently harassed by the guards for refusing to renounce his faith.

In 1938, Hegumen Leontius was released from the camp and returned to Suzdal. However, he did not take on any parish duties. He only occasionally traveled to nearby villages and conducted services in private homes. His behavior was likely due to his negative attitude toward the Soviet regime.

=== Activity in Woroncow and re-arrest ===
In July 1947, Leontius resumed his service within the structure of the Russian Orthodox Church. By the decision of Bishop Michael of Ivanovo and Kineshma, he took over the parish of the Holy Trinity in Woroncow. The clergyman organized the renovation of the parish church despite being burdened with a high tax. Archimandrite led an ascetic lifestyle, performing all the services held in the monasteries, teaching youth, and calling on parishioners to refrain from work on holidays. The faithful regarded him as a starets.

On 2 May 1950, he was arrested for the third time. This time, he was charged with spreading anti-Soviet content in his sermons, particularly by prophesying the imminent end of the world and interpreting the Holy Scriptures in an anti-state manner. He did not admit to the charges. In the same year, he was sentenced to 10 years in a labor camp. He was sent back to the camp in the Komi Republic, where he enjoyed widespread respect among his fellow prisoners. Through the power of his prayers, he was said to have healed the daughter of the camp commander (according to some sources, he performed an exorcism). As a result, he received a relaxation of the camp's regime and was allowed to perform the Holy Liturgy on Easter.

After several years, the verdict in Leontius' case was revised. The court found that the clergyman had only made occasional anti-Soviet statements and reduced his sentence to five years. As a result, on 30 April 1955, the clergyman was released from the camp.

=== Further pastoral work ===
On 20 July 1955, Bishop Benedict of Ivanovo assigned Archimandrite Leontius to the parish of Saint Michael the Archangel in Mikhaylovskoye. The priest immediately gained significant authority among the faithful. He also obtained permission to renovate the parish church. In recognition of his success in pastoral work, in 1960 he was appointed by Bishop Hilarion to the diocesan council and made the confessor for the clergy of the diocese. In the same year, the Patriarch of Moscow and all Russia honored the clergyman with the right to celebrate the Holy Liturgy with the royal doors open during the Cherubikon.

However, in the following year, due to a false accusation by a clergyman-brother of the bishop, the priest was suspended by the bishop, and after a month, he was assigned to a poor parish in Jełchowce. In 1963, due to numerous requests from the parishioners of Mikhaylovskoye, the new Bishop of Ivanovo, Leonid, sent the Archimandrite back to this town.

In his later years, illness and age made it impossible for Archimandrite Leontius to celebrate the Holy Liturgy daily. However, he still received the faithful in his home, hearing confessions, giving spiritual advice, and providing guidance. He led a modest life, never accepting monetary donations and dedicating all gifts from the faithful to maintaining the church. In 1969, he was honored by Patriarch Alexy I with the right to wear a second cross with adornments.

On 7 February 1972, he celebrated the Holy Liturgy (his last in life). The following day, he suddenly fell ill and died on 9 February in the parish house, surrounded by the church choir, which sang liturgical hymns for him. His funeral was led by Archimandrite Ambrose. According to his earlier wish, he was buried in the cemetery in Mikhaylovskoye.

In 1989, Archimandrite Leontius was fully rehabilitated.

== Cult ==
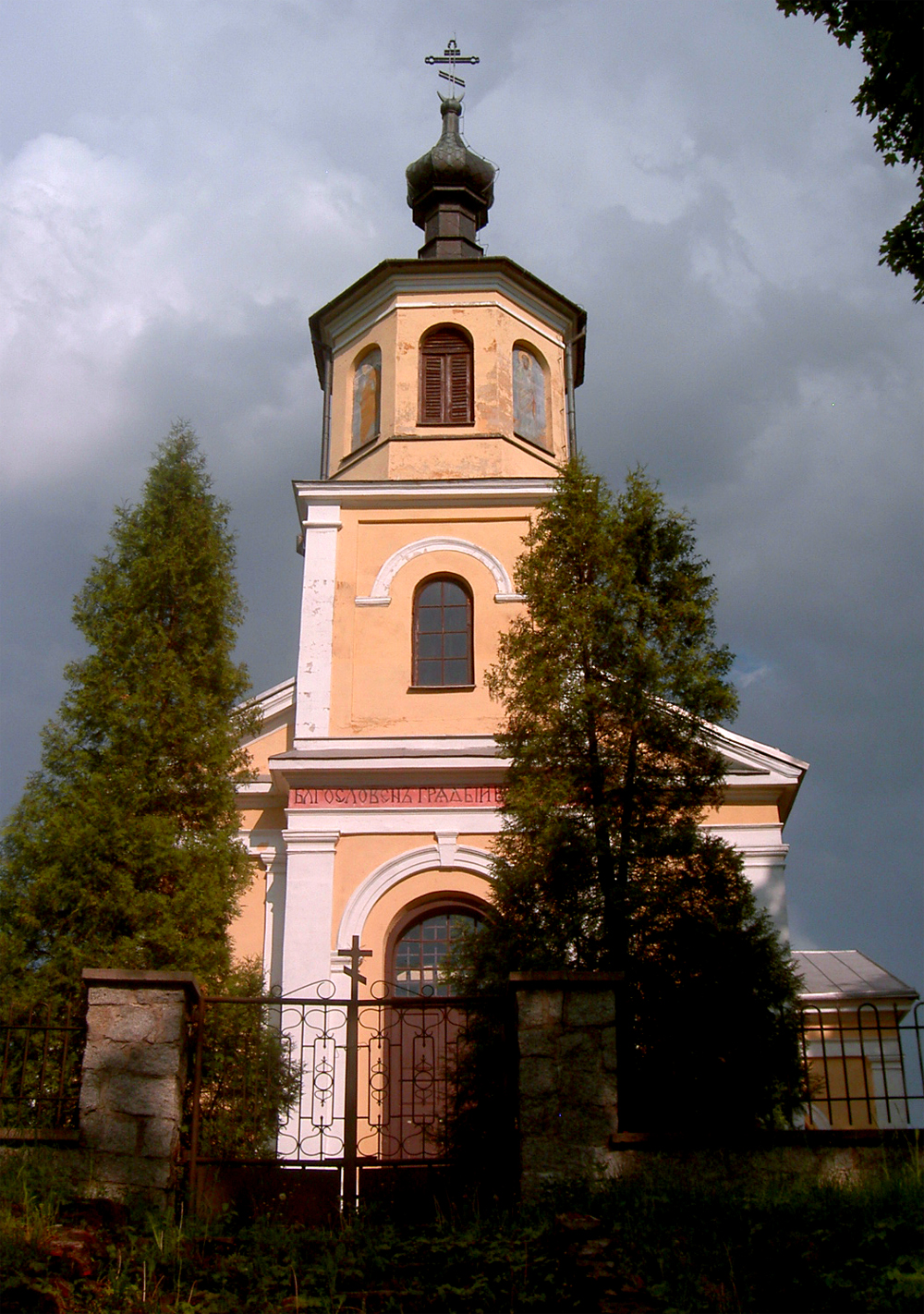
Church of the Holy Trinity in Tarnogród is the main center of the cult of Saint Leontius in the Polish Orthodox Church

Leontius was considered a saint even during his lifetime. His informal cult developed immediately after his death. A spring appeared near his grave, which is believed by Orthodox Christians to have healing powers. The church also acknowledges that miracles occurred at his grave.

In 1999, Archimandrite Leontius was proclaimed a saint by Bishop Ambrose of Ivanovo, venerated locally in the Eparchy of Ivanovo and Voznesensk of the Russian Orthodox Church. The following year, the Council of Bishops of the Moscow Patriarchate included him among the New Martyrs and Confessors of the Russian Orthodox Church, granting him the title of The Venerable. The church attributes to him the gifts of healing through prayer and the ability to foresee the future, including predicting the earthquake in Tashkent, the death of Patriarch Alexy I, the fall of communism, the discovery of the relics of Saint Seraphim of Sarov, and the moment of his own death. His relics are displayed for veneration at the Church of Saint Michael the Archangel in Mikhaylovskoye.

The cult of Archimandrite Leontius also exists in the Polish Orthodox Church. Since 2008, his icon with a relic has been displayed in the Church of the Holy Trinity in Tarnogród. In 2010, Archbishop Abel of Lublin and Chełm established a local feast in his honor on 11 November in Tarnogród. In the Polish Orthodox Church, Saint Leontius is venerated as Saint Leontius of Tarnogród.

== Bibliography ==
- Charkiewicz, Jarosław (2008). Męczennicy XX wieku. Martyrologia Prawosławia w Polsce w biografiach świętych [Martyrs of the 20th Century. The Martyrology of Orthodoxy in Poland in the Biographies of Saints] (in Polish). Warsaw: Warszawska Metropolia Prawosławna. ISBN 978-83-60311-11-0.
