= Battle of Borowe Młyny =

1863 battle

- Part of January Uprising
Date	16 April 1863
Location	Borowe Młyny
Result	Polish victory

Belligerents
Polish insurgents	Imperial Russian Army

Commanders and leaders
Colonel Marcin Borelowski	

Strength
300	1,000

The Battle of Borowe Mlyny, one of many skirmishes of the January Uprising, took place on 16 April 1863 near the village of Borowe Mlyny in southeastern part of Russian-controlled Congress Poland. 300 Polish insurgents under Colonel Marcin Borelowski clashed with approximately 1,000 soldiers of the Imperial Russian Army.

Borelowski and his party camped in a forest between the villages of Majdan Sopocki and Borowiec. They were spotted by Russians, whose garrison was stationed in Tarnogród. The Russians immediately sent approximately 1,000 soldiers, who attacked the Poles. While some Polish insurgents decided to fight, others fled through nearby border to Austrian Galicia. Polish and Russian losses in the skirmish are unknown.

== Sources ==
- Stefan Kieniewicz: Powstanie styczniowe. Warszawa: Państwowe Wydawnictwo Naukowe, 1983. ISBN 83-01-03652-4.
- Stanisław Zieliński: Bitwy i potyczki 1863–1864, Rapperswil 1913
