= Church of the Holy Trinity, Tarnogród =

Orthodox church in Tarnogród, Poland

Church of the Holy Trinity
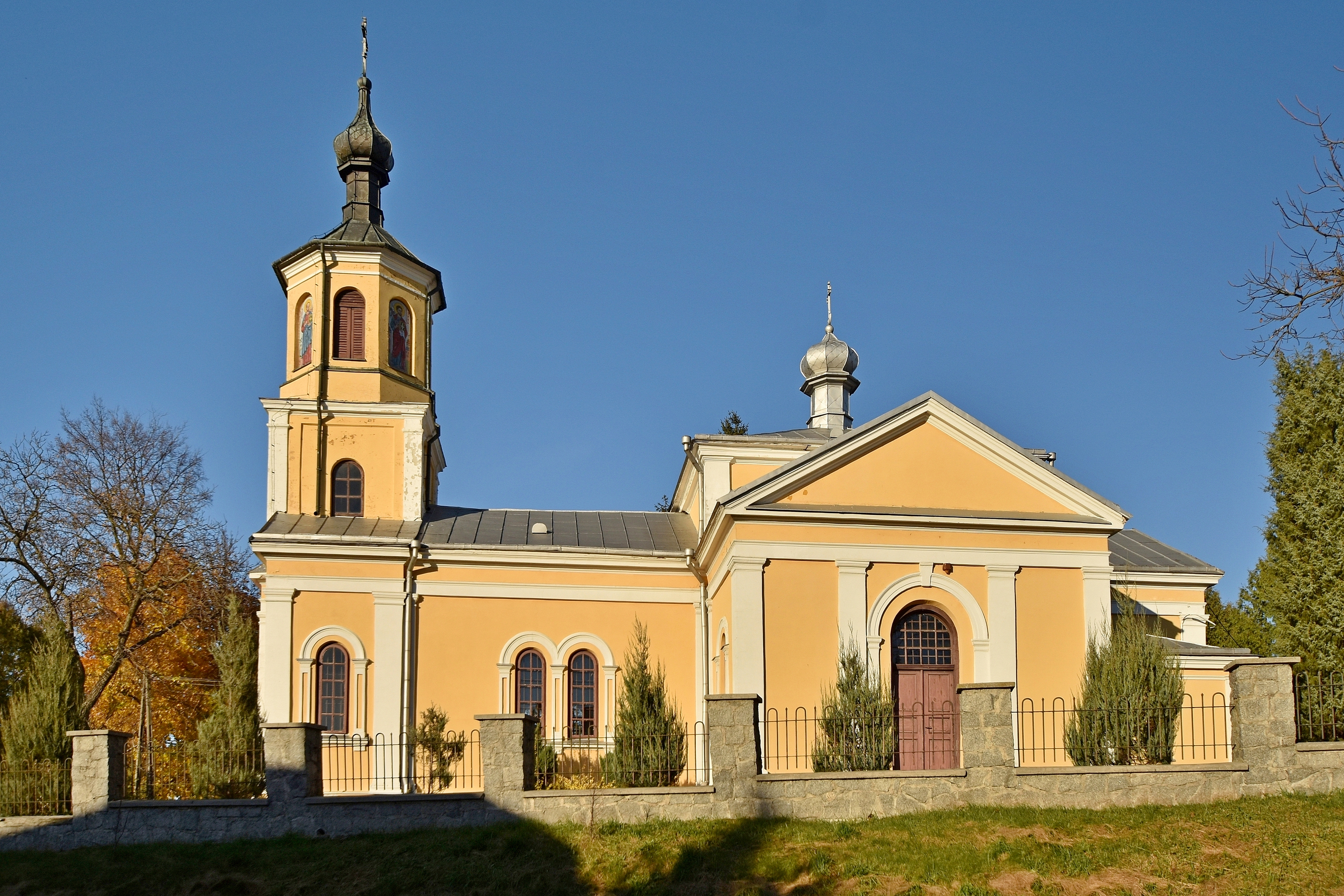
- Church of the Holy Trinity
- 50°21′44.5″N 22°44′19.0″E
- Location: Tarnogród
- Country: Poland
- Denomination: Eastern Orthodoxy
- Churchmanship: Polish Orthodox Church

History
- Status: active Orthodox church
- Dedication: Trinity

Architecture
- Years built: 1870–1875

Specifications
- Materials: brick

Administration
- Diocese: Diocese of Lublin and Chełm

Church of the Holy Trinity (also known as Saint George church) is an Orthodox parish church in Tarnogród. It belongs to the Zamość deanery of the Diocese of Lublin and Chełm of the Polish Orthodox Church.

The Orthodox church in Tarnogród was established in the early years after the town's founding, toward the end of the 1560s. According to various sources, the church remained Orthodox until 1772 or only until the mid-17th century, after which it transitioned to the Uniate Church. The original structure was wooden, featuring a single dome and a detached bell tower. In the late 1860s or early 1870s, a new brick church was built in Tarnogród using funds allocated by the government for constructing new Uniate churches. This building continues to serve as an Orthodox parish church. It was officially converted to Orthodoxy in 1875 following the Conversion of Chełm Eparchy.

The church was closed in 1915 due to the exodus of Orthodox believers during the wartime flight. It was officially reopened in 1921 and served as a parish seat throughout the interwar period. It remained operational during World War II and continued functioning in 1946, one of the few Orthodox pastoral centers left in the Lublin Land after the forced relocation of Ukrainian Orthodox communities to the Soviet Union. It was also active after Operation Vistula.

The church is a center for the veneration of Saint Leontius, Venerable canonized in 1999 by the Russian Orthodox Church, born in Tarnogród. The Tarnogród Icon of the Mother of God is also held in special veneration there.

The temple is located in the central part of the village, west of the town square, on Cerkiewna Street. It stands on an elevated site along the road leading to Bukowina.

== History ==
=== First churches in Tarnogród ===
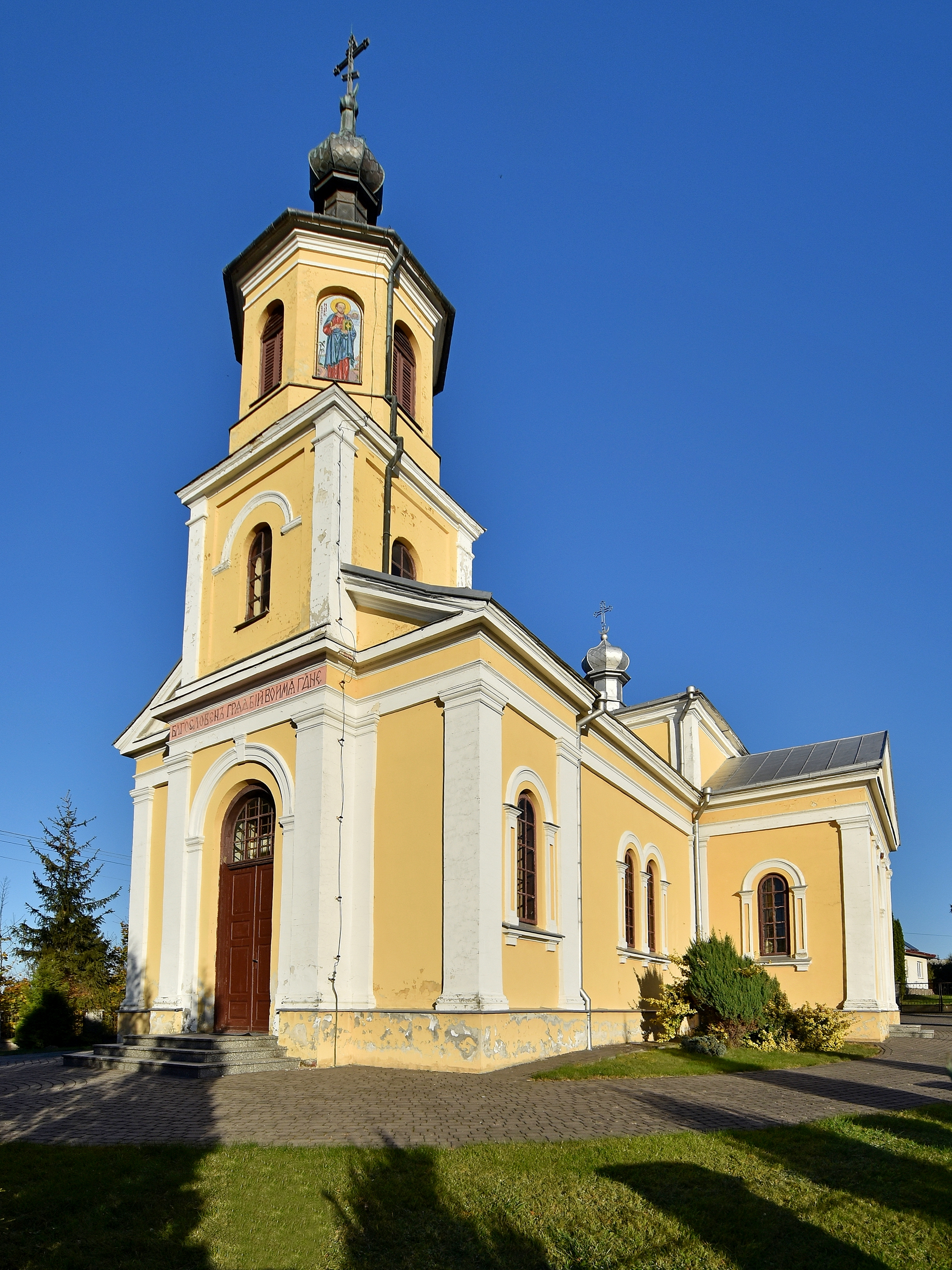
Front elevation

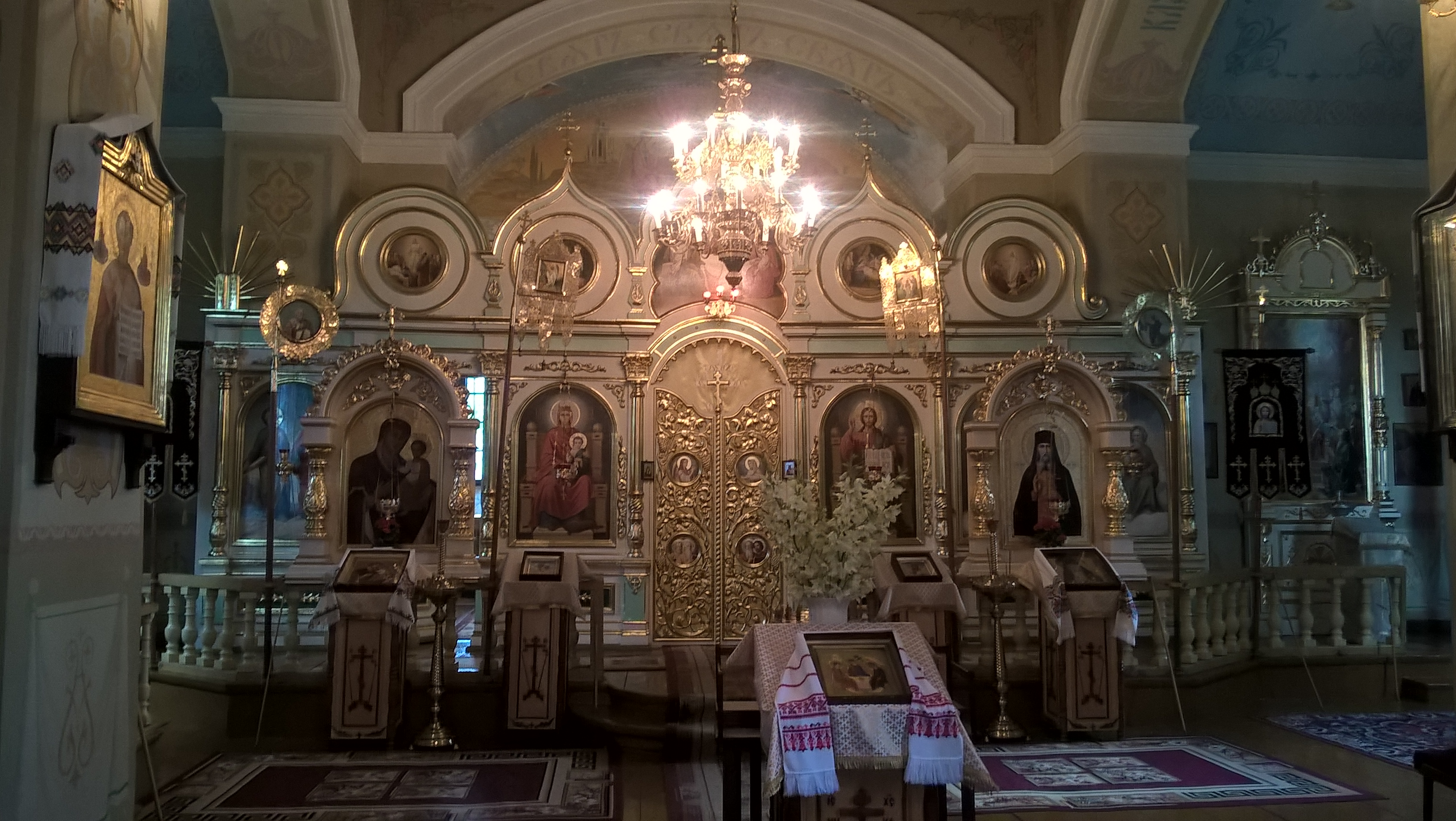
Interior of the church

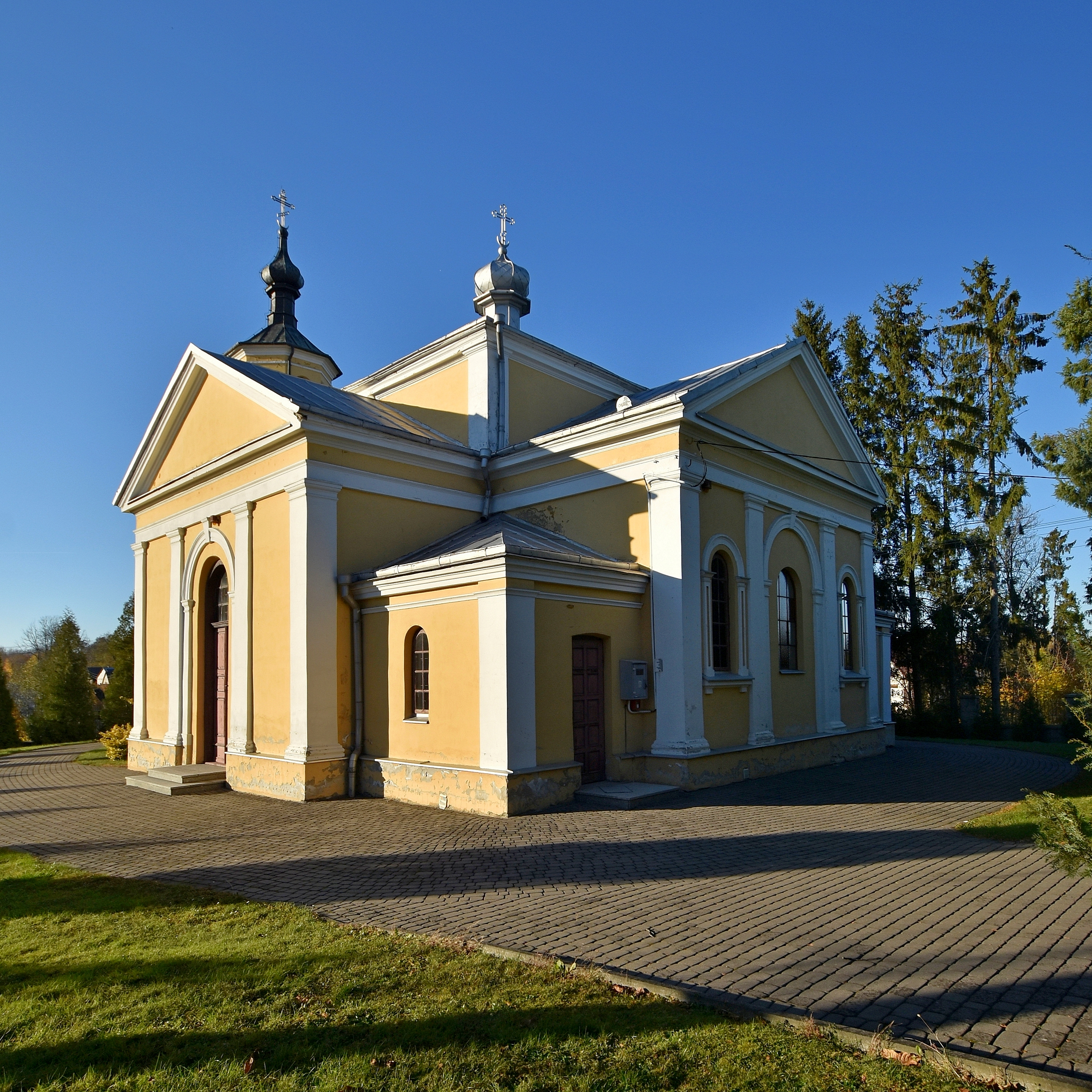
View from the side of the presbytery

The first church in Tarnogród was established between 1567 and 1569. The founding act of the town from 1567 included a mention of the endowment of an Orthodox church, as well as a Catholic church, which was built at the same time. For the Orthodox parish, King Sigismund II Augustus allocated half a lan of land when issuing the founding act. The first written record of the functioning church dates back to 1591.

The church likely burned down in 1645 during a fire that also destroyed the Catholic church. According to another source, the fire occurred earlier, and the church was restored in 1645. Yet another group of researchers claims the church was destroyed during a Tatar raid between 1622 and 1623 and rebuilt 20 years later.

The church in Tarnogród remained Orthodox for several years after the Union of Brest, at least until the death of Bishop Michał Kopysteński of Przemyśl, who did not sign the union agreement. After his death, the Uniate bishop Atanazy Krupecki received the royal privilege for the Przemyśl cathedral, while the Orthodox nobility demanded the appointment of Jan Chłopecki, who remained Orthodox, as the ordinary. The struggle for control over the diocese lasted from 1610 to 1652, during which individual parishes decided on their own which bishop they recognized as their superior. Documents from 1652 suggest that by this year, the Tarnogród church had joined the Uniate Church. However, in 1694, Tarnogród was still listed as the seat of one of the deaneries of the Orthodox Eparchy of Przemyśl. According to Marian Bendza, the local parish remained under this jurisdiction until 1772, officially adopting the union in 1773.

The Tarnogród church was a wooden structure. A description from 1763 notes that it had a single dome and five altars dedicated to Deesis, Christ the Savior, the Holy Trinity, the Blessed Virgin Mary, and Saint Nicholas. East of the church, near the wall surrounding the church grounds, stood a bell tower with three bells.

In 1773, the Tarnogród church was once again renovated and survived until the early 19th century, when it was replaced by a new wooden structure. Repairs to the church were funded by parishioners' donations, as its patrons failed to show sufficient initiative in this regard. In 1785, it served a parish of 785 faithful. During the 18th century, the Tarnogród church became a center for the veneration of an icon of the Blessed Virgin Mary, considered miraculous.

In 1819, the Tarnogród Uniate parish served 1,819 faithful, but 10 years later, this number had dropped to 1,417. According to 1840 records, the Uniate church in Tarnogród served 1,168 parishioners (or only 900, according to another estimate) and operated a filial church in Luchów Górny. From 1824 to 1866, it served as the seat of a deanery. The decline in the number of Byzantine Rite Catholics was likely due to their conversion to the Latin Rite. In the years immediately preceding the January Uprising, only about 800 Uniates remained in Tarnogród.

=== Construction of the new Orthodox church ===
In the 1850s, 94 Uniates from Tarnogród converted to Orthodoxy, reportedly due to their unwillingness to share the costs of rebuilding the Uniate rectory. In 1856, the Orthodox residents of Tarnogród appealed to the Zamoyski family entail for assistance in constructing a church, as they lacked the necessary funds. However, their request was denied. In 1860, the civil governor of Lublin supported the initiative and designated an empty plot of land for the church's construction. This plot had previously housed the Catholic Church of the Holy Spirit, which, in poor condition, had survived until 1790, when the pastor of the Catholic parish in Tarnogród sold it to a private individual who subsequently demolished it.

The construction of the Orthodox church was completed before the January Uprising, making Tarnogród one of the centers of Orthodoxy in the region even before the Conversion of Chełm Eparchy in 1875. (Note: Orthodox churches in Chełm Land were also established in Babice, Luchów, and Potok before 1864 (Szczygieł (2006, p. 180)).) However, the dedication of the new church did not occur until 1872, performed by Bishop Flavian Gorodiecki of Chełm and Warsaw.

=== Construction and operation of the church in the Russian Empire ===
The currently existing church was built, according to various sources, between 1868 and 1872, between 1871 and 1872, or between 1870 and 1875. Its construction was funded by the State Treasury using a special fund designated for building Uniate churches, with additional contributions from local parishioners. It was situated not on the site of the older church but on a hill opposite it. This allowed the Uniate, and later Orthodox, pastoral community to use two sacred buildings for a time.

The church in Tarnogród was constructed during a period when the Russian state financed the building of new Uniate churches in Chełm Land to foster Russian national consciousness among the local Uniates. Special attention was given to incorporating distinct East Slavic elements in the architecture of these sacred structures. Typically, the churches were built on a cruciform plan, with a clear delineation of three parts: the church porch, nave, and chancel.

The Uniate church in Tarnogród was transferred to the ownership of the Russian Orthodox Church following the dissolution of the Uniate Diocese of Chełm in 1875. Later, by the end of the century, the Orthodox church built after 1860 was dismantled, and the parish used only the former Uniate structure. In 1884, the church served 1,143 people; in 1900, 1,268; and in 1905, 1,349. By 1911, the parish had 1,128 members.

=== In independent Poland ===
In 1921, the Biłgoraj County office planned to open three Orthodox churches in the county (home to 16,714 Orthodox believers, comprising 18.4% of the population), including one in Tarnogród. The Tarnogród church was intended to serve a parish of 5,764 people, as all Orthodox churches in the surrounding villages had been closed. From 1923, the church served as the seat of the Biłgoraj deanery (since the Orthodox parish in Biłgoraj itself had not resumed operations) under the Diocese of Warsaw and Chełm.

On 27 September 1937, the Tarnogród church was visited by Bishop Sava Sovietov of Lublin. As one of the few remaining Orthodox pastoral centers in Lublin Land, it remained active after 1946, despite the resettlement of the Ukrainian Orthodox population to the Soviet Union and Operation Vistula. At that time, the Tarnogród parish was estimated to have about 340 members, though another source suggests only 100 Orthodox believers remained. The church was kept open for liturgical use despite efforts by the Biłgoraj County office to repurpose the building as a public school, and despite the willingness of the Polish Orthodox Church authorities to relinquish it. (Note: In 1945, Bishop Timothy Szretter of Chełm declared that the Polish Orthodox Church intended to retain only the parishes in Lublin, Chełm, Terespol, Włodawa, Biała Podlaska, Hrubieszów, and the St. Onuphrius Monastery in Jabłeczna. These parishes were meant to serve Polish Orthodox believers. In doing so, perhaps under pressure from the authorities, the Orthodox church effectively acquiesced to the ongoing deportations of the Ukrainian population, the vast majority of whom belonged to this church (Wysocki (2011, p. 75)).) After the resettlements, the Tarnogród church became one of 10 Orthodox parishes in Lublin Land and one of four active churches in the Lublin deanery of the Diocese of Warsaw and Bielsko.

In 1946, the church required extensive renovations. Over subsequent years, some icons from former churches (transferred to the Catholic Church) in Biłgoraj, Babice, and Majdan Stary were moved to the Tarnogród church. In 1967, the roof was restored, and electricity was installed. The interior of the church was renovated in 1968. By 1969, the church's congregation was estimated at up to 600 members.

Further renovations took place in the 1980s: in 1980, the church's exterior façade was repaired, and in 1983, a stone-and-metal fence was erected around it. By the late 20th century, the Tarnogród parish numbered 240 members. Through the efforts of the parish priest, Father Włodzimierz Klimuk, a comprehensive renovation of the church was carried out between 1995 and 1999. Between 2002 and 2003, new polychrome decorations were added to the interior, and the iconostasis was expanded.

The church was entered into the register of historical monuments on 11 October 1979, under number A/1313.

== Architecture ==
The church was built in the shape of a cross. The central part of the cross is higher, covered by a four-pitched tent roof, above which rises an octagonal ridge turret topped with a small onion dome. The rectangular side arms of the cross have gable roofs. The three-part chancel has a simple, straight closure. The bell tower is located above the church porch, crowned by a second onion dome. The exterior of the building is adorned with classical detailing.

Inside the church, there is an iconostasis from the second half of the 19th century, expanded between 2002 and 2003. During the same period, a polychrome was added to decorate the temple. The church can accommodate 350 people.

Adjacent to the church are three tombstones of Orthodox clergy and two graves of children of priests who served in the church. Behind the altar, on the premises, there is also a metal Orthodox cross. There has never been a cemetery for parishioners at the church; Orthodox burials have taken place since the 19th century at a cemetery outside the city, along the road to Biszcza.

== People associated with the church ==
Tarnogród was the birthplace of the Orthodox Saint Leontius, a monk and confessor, canonized in 1999 by the Russian Orthodox Church. Since 2000, an icon of the saint has been present in the Tarnogród church. However, his veneration in the Polish Orthodox Church (as Leontius of Tarnogród) emerged in 2008. That year, the Tarnogród church received an icon containing a relic of the saint from the village of Mikhaylovskoye, where he spent the last years of his life. In 2010, Archbishop Abel Popławski of Lublin and Chełm established a local feast in his honor, celebrated in Tarnogród on November 11.

In 1922, the parson in Tarnogród was Father Mateusz Siemaszko, who later became the Orthodox Bishop of Brasław and Deputy Orthodox Military Ordinary of the Polish Armed Forces in the West.

== Bibliography ==
- Szczygieł, R., ed. (2006). Dzieje Tarnogrodu [History of Tarnogród] (in Polish). Tarnogród: Urząd Miasta i Gminy w Tarnogrodzie.
- Cynalewska-Kuczma, P. (2004). Architektura cerkiewna Królestwa Polskiego narzędziem integracji z Imperium Rosyjskim [Orthodox Church Architecture of the Polish Kingdom As a Tool For Integration With the Russian Empire] (in Polish). Poznań: Wydawnictwo Naukowe Uniwersytetu Adama Mickiewicza. ISBN 83-232-1463-8.
- Wysocki, J. (2011). Ukraińcy na Lubelszczyźnie w latach 1944–1956 [Ukrainians in the Lublin Land in 1944-1956] (in Polish). Lublin: Instytut Pamięci Narodowej. ISBN 978-83-7629-260-1.
