= Pierogowiec =

- Village
- Location within Poland
- Coordinates: 50°19′N 22°43′E
- Country: Poland
- Voivodeship: Lublin
- County: Biłgoraj
- Gmina: Tarnogród

Pierogowiec [pjɛrɔˈɡɔvjɛt͡s] is a village in the administrative district of Gmina Tarnogród, within Biłgoraj County, Lublin Voivodeship, in eastern Poland.
