= Gmina Tarnogród =

Gmina Tarnogród Tarnogród Commune
- Gmina
- Coat of arms

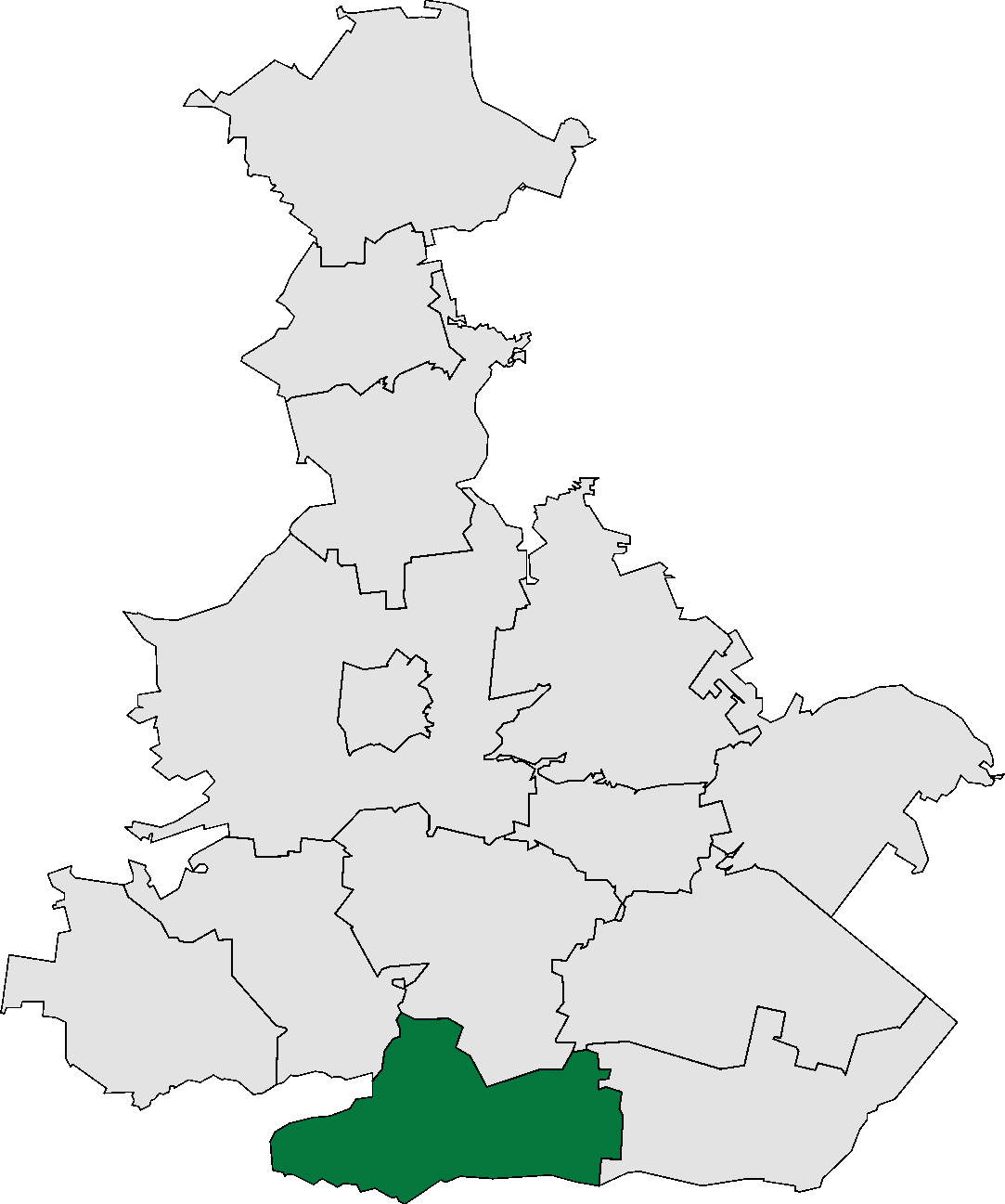
- Location within the county

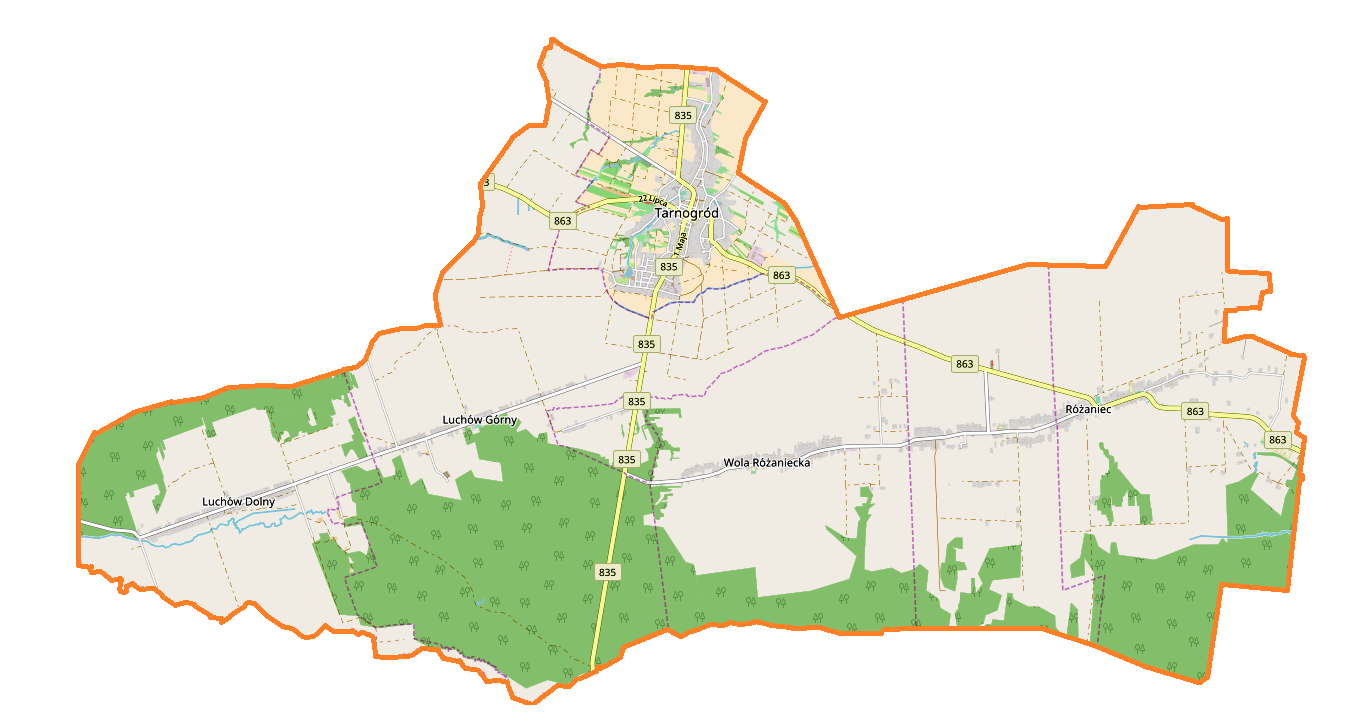
- Gmina's Map
- Coordinates (Tarnogród): 50°22′N 22°44′E
- Country: Poland
- Voivodeship: Lublin
- County: Biłgoraj
- Seat: Tarnogród

Government
  - Mayor: Paweł Dec

Area
  - Total: 114.25 km^{2} (44.11 sq mi)

Population (2024)
  - Total: 6,121
  - Density: 53.58/km^{2} (138.8/sq mi)
  - Urban: 3,080
  - Rural: 3,041
- Postal code: 23-420
- Website: https://www.tarnogrod.pl/

Gmina Tarnogród is an urban-rural gmina (administrative district) in Biłgoraj County, Lublin Voivodeship, in eastern Poland. Its seat is the town of Tarnogród, which lies approximately 21 kilometres (13 mi) south of Biłgoraj and 99 km (62 mi) south of the regional capital Lublin.

The gmina covers an area of 114.25 square kilometres (44.1 sq mi), and as of 2006 its total population is 6,860 (out of which the population of Tarnogród amounts to 3,372, and the population of the rural part of the gmina is 3,488).

== History ==
Tarnogród was founded in 1567. The town and gmina owes its founding and its name to the Starosta of Krzeszów, Stanisław Tarnowski, who established it in 1567 in a place called by the local people “Cierniogród” (Thorn Town), within the Krzeszów district in the Przemyśl Land of the Ruthenian Voivodeship.

From 1588, Tarnogród became part of the estates of Jan Zamoyski and later developed into an important center of the Zamoyski Family Entail (Ordynacja Zamojska). In Polish history, Tarnogród is remembered as the site where the Tarnogród Confederation was formed in 1715 — a political and military alliance opposing the presence of Saxon troops in Poland and the policies of King Augustus II.

After the First Partition of Poland, Tarnogród came under Austrian rule and remained so until 1809, when — after being incorporated into the Duchy of Warsaw — it became the capital of a newly created county in the Lublin Department, which included, among others, the towns of Biłgoraj, Frampol, Goraj, Zamość, and Krzeszów.

Tarnogród lost its county-town status in 1842, and in 1867 it was deprived of its municipal rights (as punishment for the active participation of its inhabitants in the January Uprising). From that year onward, it was part of Biłgoraj County and remained a large settlement — in 1906 it had about 7,000 inhabitants, and before World War II, around 5,000.

The years of World War II were tragic for the inhabitants of the town and municipality. More than half of the town's buildings were destroyed. In November 1942, the Nazis murdered about 2,000 local Jews, and the remaining ones were deported to extermination camps.

On June 30, 1943, the Nazis deported the Polish inhabitants of Tarnogród to transit camps, and later to forced labor in the Third Reich.

The war greatly worsened the town's condition, especially by drastically reducing its population. The number of residents fell even further after 1944, when the local Ukrainians were relocated to the USSR. As a result, in 1946, Tarnogród had only about 2,200 inhabitants.

Until 1954, the area of the present-day municipality was divided into two separate administrative units: Gmina Tarnogród (consisting of Tarnogród itself) and Gmina Wola Różaniecka (covering the surrounding rural area).

On January 1, 1987, Tarnogród regained its municipal rights.

== Villages ==
Apart from the town of Tarnogród, Gmina Tarnogród contains the villages and settlements of Bolesławin, Cichy, Jamieńszczyzna, Kolonia Różaniecka, Luchów Dolny, Luchów Górny, Pierogowiec, Popówka, Różaniec, Różaniec-Szkoła, Wola Różaniecka and Zagrody.

Village populations according to the 2021 Polish census
Rank	Name	Population	Men	Women
1	Tarnogród	2,999	1,442	1,557
2	Różaniec	1,235	600	635
3	Wola Różaniecka	668	352	316
4	Luchów Dolny	547	278	269
5	Luchów Górny	542	292	250

== Neighbouring gminas ==
Gmina Tarnogród is bordered by the gminas of Adamówka, Biszcza, Księżpol, Kuryłówka, Łukowa, Obsza and Stary Dzików.

== Demographics ==
Historical population
Year	Population	Urban	Rural	Men	Women
2024	6,121	3,080	3,041	3,052	3,069
2023	6,195	3,109	3,086	3,084	3,111
2022	6,273	3,161	3,112	3,118	3,155
2021	6,316	3,184	3,132	3,133	3,183
2020	6,369	3,220	3,149	3,155	3,214
2019	6,655	3,308	3,347	3,321	3,334
2018	6,700	3,351	3,349	3,334	3,366
2017	6,744	3,395	3,349	3,352	3,392
2016	6,776	3,406	3,370	3,376	3,400
2015	6,829	3,438	3,391	3,403	3,426
2014	6,857	3,457	3,400	3,413	3,444
2013	6,892	3,464	3,428	3,434	3,458
2012	6,883	3,467	3,416	3,439	3,444
2011	6,895	3,461	3,434	3,437	3,458
2010	6,942	3,500	3,442	3,455	3,487
2009	6,737	3,351	3,386	3,357	3,380
2008	6,813	3,396	3,417	3,392	3,421
2007	6,807	3,366	3,441	3,393	3,414
2006	6,839	3,399	3,440	3,419	3,420
2005	6,874	3,372	3,502	3,432	3,442
2004	6,963	3,445	3,518	3,495	3,468
2003	6,987	3,435	3,552	3,491	3,496
2002	7,016	3,458	3,558	3,493	3,523
2001	7,030	3,466	3,564	3,495	3,535
2000	7,081	3,483	3,598	3,502	3,579
1999	7,199	3,480	3,719	3,555	3,644
1998	7,408	3,489	3,919	3,638	3,770
1997	7,294	3,483	3,811	3,573	3,721
1996	7,265	3,482	3,783	3,569	3,696
1995	7,263	3,490	3,773	3,551	3,712
