= Jewish Cemetery, Tarnogród =

Cemetery in Tarnogród, Poland

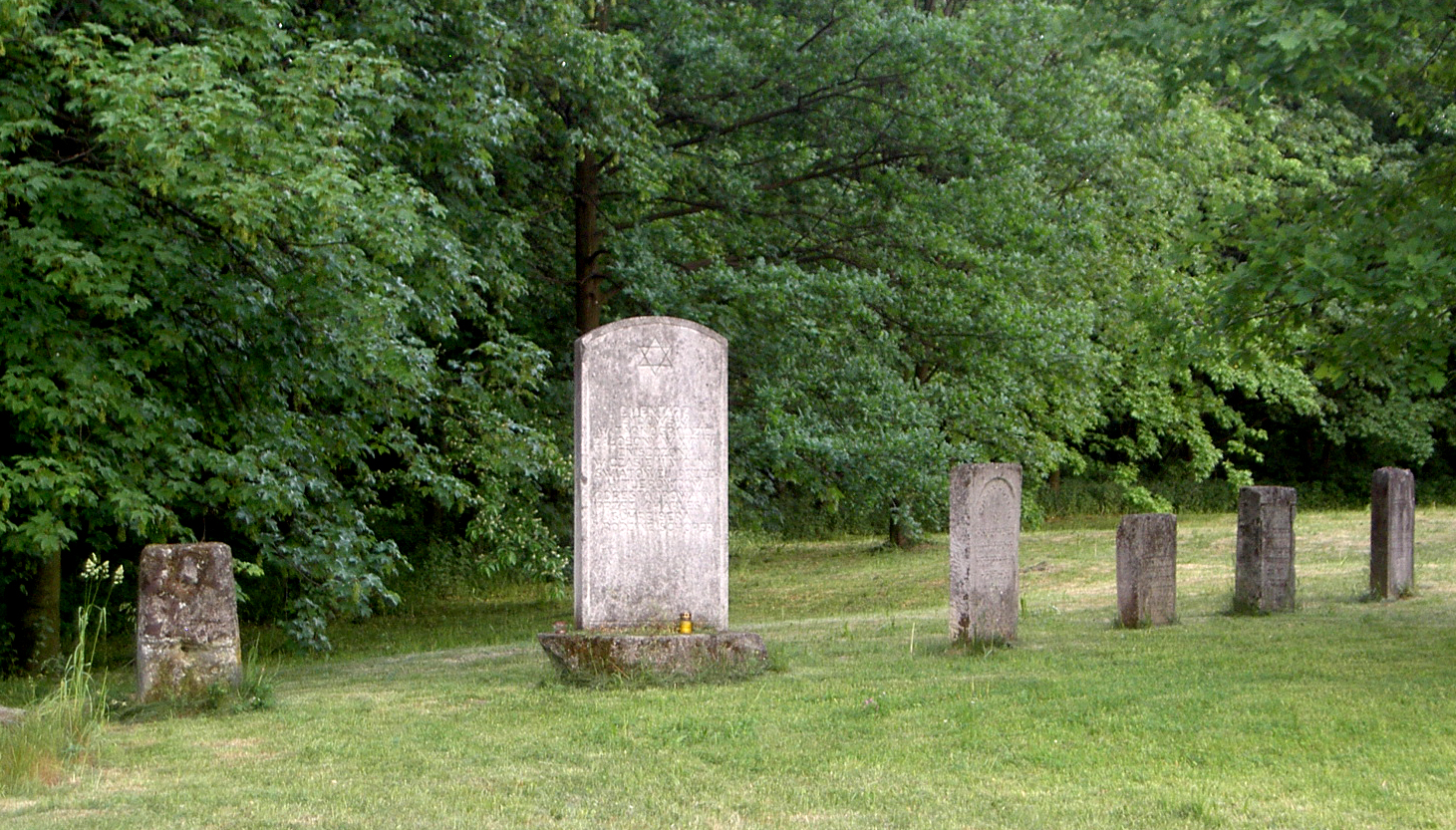
- General view in 2007
- Interactive map of Jewish Cemetery, Tarnogród

Details
- Established: 17th century
- Location: Tarnogród, Poland
- Country: Poland
- Coordinates: 50°21′38″N 22°44′55″E
- Type: Jewish cemetery
- Size: 1.8 ha

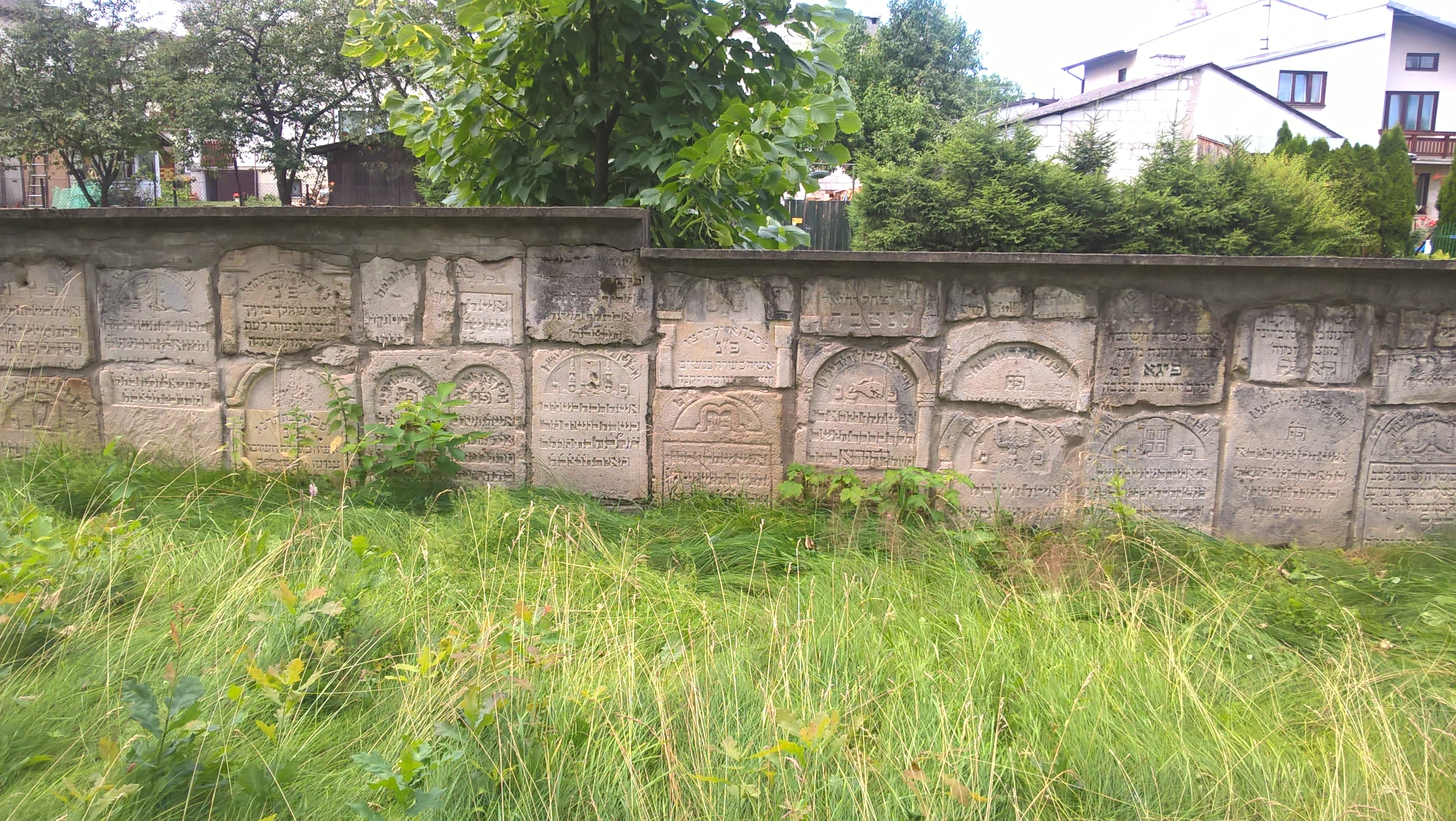
Fragment of matzevahs forming the wall of the present day cemetery

The Jewish Cemetery (Polish: Cmentarz Żydowski w Tarnogrodzie) in Tarnogród was probably established in 1588. Located to the east of the synagogue, it covered an area of 1.8 hectares. During World War II, the Nazi Germans occupying Poland desecrated and destroyed the cemetery. In 1942 the cemetery became the site of execution.

A few decades after the end of the war, from 1986 until 1990, the cemetery was renovated and partly surrounded by a wall to mark and protect it. Around 100 pieces of recovered tombstones were placed within the area. Some of the tombstones were embedded into the wall, becoming the so-called "commemoration wall". There is a monument to the memory of Poles of Jewish origin from Tarnogród who were murdered by the Germans in 1942.

Date of the oldest tombstone - 1875, the newest tombstone - 1937.

== Bibliography ==
- Burchard, Przemysław (1990). Pamiątki i zabytki kultury żydowskiej w Polsce (in Polish). Warszawa: [s. n.] p. 177.
- A map of Leżajsk by the Polish Military Geographical Institute 47th strip 35th pole Warsaw of 1938.
