= Zagrody, Gmina Tarnogród =

Zagrody
- Village
- Location within Poland
- Coordinates: 50°19′31″N 22°44′43″E
- Country: Poland
- Voivodeship: Lublin
- County: Biłgoraj
- Gmina: Tarnogród

Zagrody [zaˈɡrɔdɨ] is a village in the administrative district of Gmina Tarnogród, within Biłgoraj County, Lublin Voivodeship, in eastern Poland.
