= Jamieńszczyzna =

- Village
- Location within Poland
- Coordinates: 50°20′N 22°52′E
- Country: Poland
- Voivodeship: Lublin
- County: Biłgoraj
- Gmina: Tarnogród

Jamieńszczyzna [jamjɛɲʂˈt͡ʂɨzna] is a village in the administrative district of Gmina Tarnogród, within Biłgoraj County, Lublin Voivodeship, in eastern Poland.
