= Cichy, Lublin Voivodeship =

Cichy
- Village
- Location within Poland
- Coordinates: 50°20′11″N 22°42′50″E
- Country: Poland
- Voivodeship: Lublin
- County: Biłgoraj
- Gmina: Tarnogród

Cichy [ˈt͡ɕixɨ] is a village in the administrative district of Gmina Tarnogród, within Biłgoraj County, Lublin Voivodeship, in eastern Poland.
