= Popówka, Lublin Voivodeship =

Popówka
- Village
- Location within Poland
- Coordinates: 52°04′34″N 23°26′21″E
- Country: Poland
- Voivodeship: Lublin
- County: Biłgoraj
- Gmina: Tarnogród

Popówka [pɔˈpufka] is a village in the administrative district of Gmina Tarnogród, within Biłgoraj County, Lublin Voivodeship, in eastern Poland.
