= Luchów Dolny =

- Village
- Location within Poland
- Coordinates: 50°19′N 22°38′E
- Country: Poland
- Voivodeship: Lublin
- County: Biłgoraj
- Gmina: Tarnogród

Population
  - Total: 589

Luchów Dolny [ˈluxuf ˈdɔlnɨ] is a village in the administrative district of Gmina Tarnogród, within Biłgoraj County, Lublin Voivodeship, in eastern Poland.
