= Różaniec, Lublin Voivodeship =

Różaniec
- Village
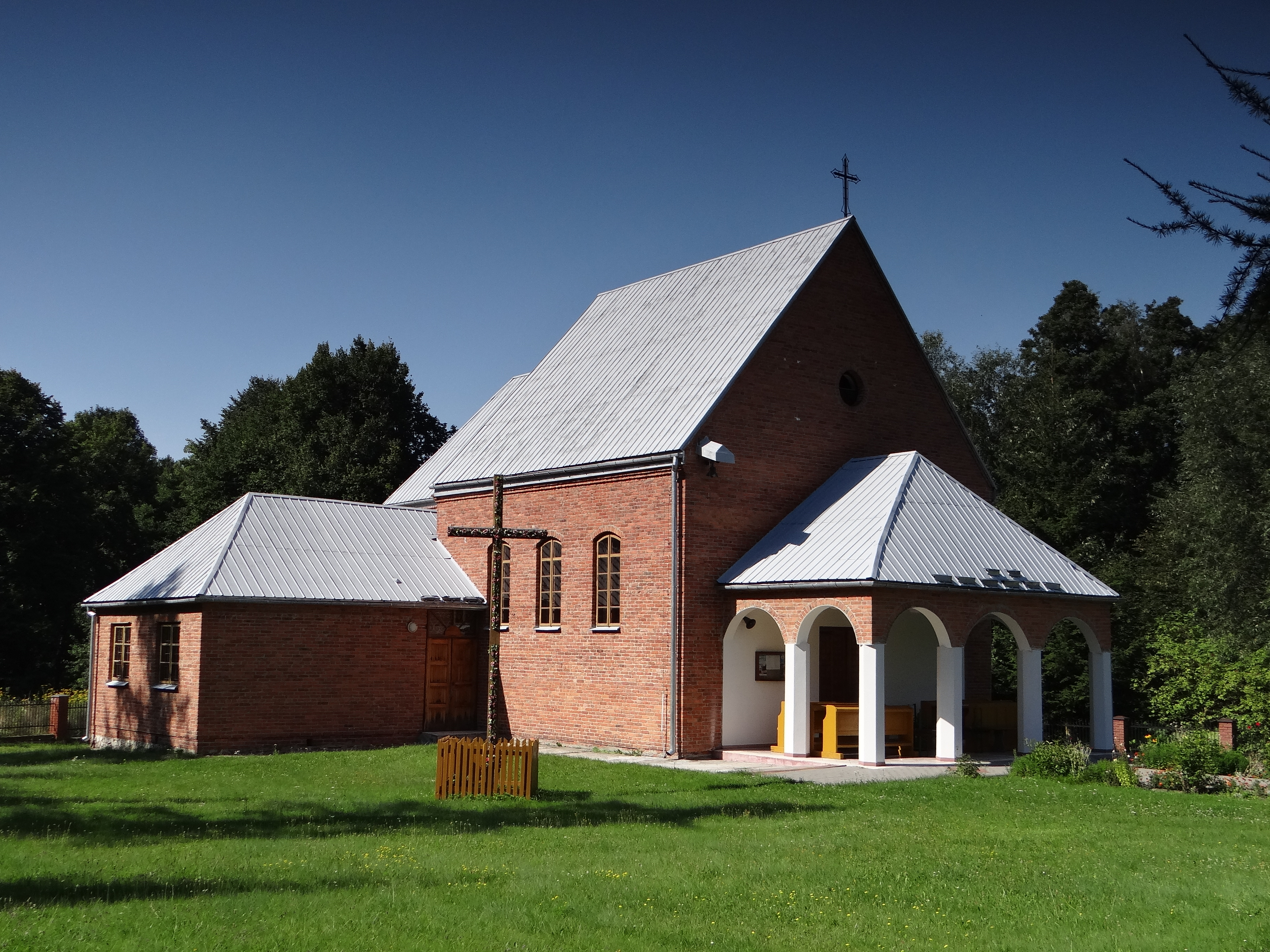
- Church of Saint Stanislaus Kostka

- Location within Poland
- Coordinates: 50°20′2″N 22°50′2″E
- Country: Poland
- Voivodeship: Lublin
- County: Biłgoraj
- Gmina: Tarnogród

Population
  - Total: 1,556

Różaniec [ruˈʐaɲɛt͡s] is a village in the administrative district of Gmina Tarnogród, within Biłgoraj County, Lublin Voivodeship, in eastern Poland.
