= Wola Różaniecka =

- Village
- Location within Poland
- Coordinates: 50°20′N 22°46′E
- Country: Poland
- Voivodeship: Lublin
- County: Biłgoraj
- Gmina: Tarnogród

Population
  - Total: 784
- Time zone: UTC+1 (CET)
  - Summer (DST): UTC+2 (CEST)
- Vehicle registration: LBL

Wola Różaniecka [ˈvɔla ruʐaˈɲɛt͡ska] is a village in the administrative district of Gmina Tarnogród, within Biłgoraj County, Lublin Voivodeship, in south-eastern Poland.

Following the German-Soviet invasion of Poland, which started World War II in September 1939, the village was occupied by Germany until 1944. In October 1942, the German police and Ukrainian auxiliaries committed a massacre of six Poles.
