= Tarnogród =

Town in Lublin Voivodeship, Poland

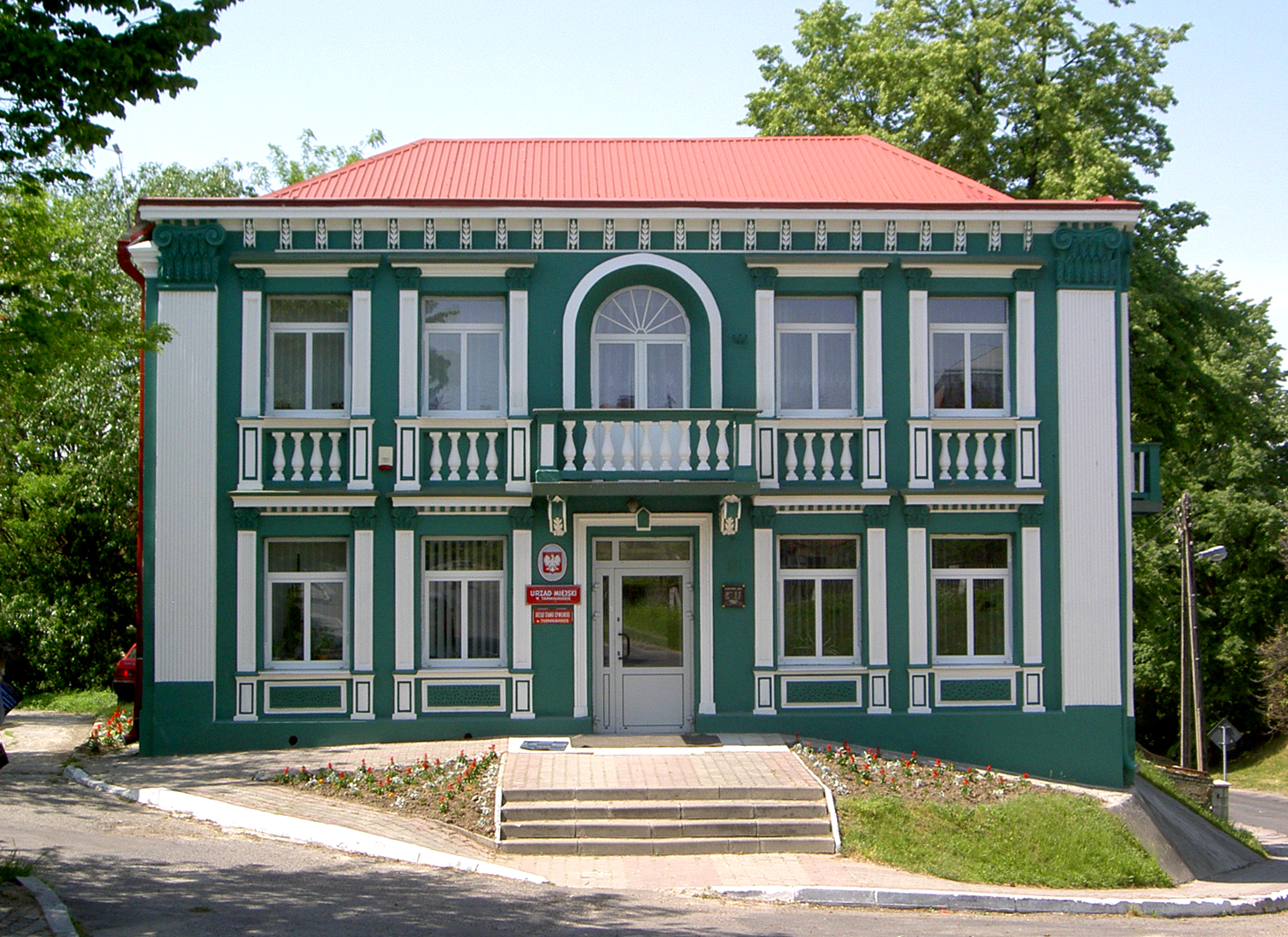
- Palace in Tarnogród

- Coat of arms
- Interactive map of Tarnogród
- Location within Poland
- Coordinates: 50°22′N 22°44′E
- Country: Poland
- Voivodeship: Lublin
- County: Biłgoraj
- Gmina: Tarnogród
- Established: before 16th century
- Town rights: 1567–1867, 1987

Government
  - Mayor: Paweł Dec

Area
  - Total: 10.69 km^{2} (4.13 sq mi)

Population (2024)
  - Total: 3,080
  - Density: 288/km^{2} (746/sq mi)
- Time zone: UTC+1 (CET)
  - Summer (DST): UTC+2 (CEST)
- Postal code: 23-420
- Area code: +48 84
- Car plates: LBL
- Website: www.tarnogrod.pl

Tarnogród (Note: Polish: [tarˈnɔɡrut]; Yiddish: טאַרנעגראָד, romanized: Tarnegrod; Ukrainian: Терногород, romanized: Ternohorod, or Тарногород, Tarnohorod) is a town in Biłgoraj County, Lublin Voivodeship, Poland. It has a population of 3,399 (2006).

Tarnogród is the southernmost town of the voivodeship; the distance to Lublin is 110 kilometres, while the distance to Rzeszów is only 70 kilometres (43 miles).

== History ==
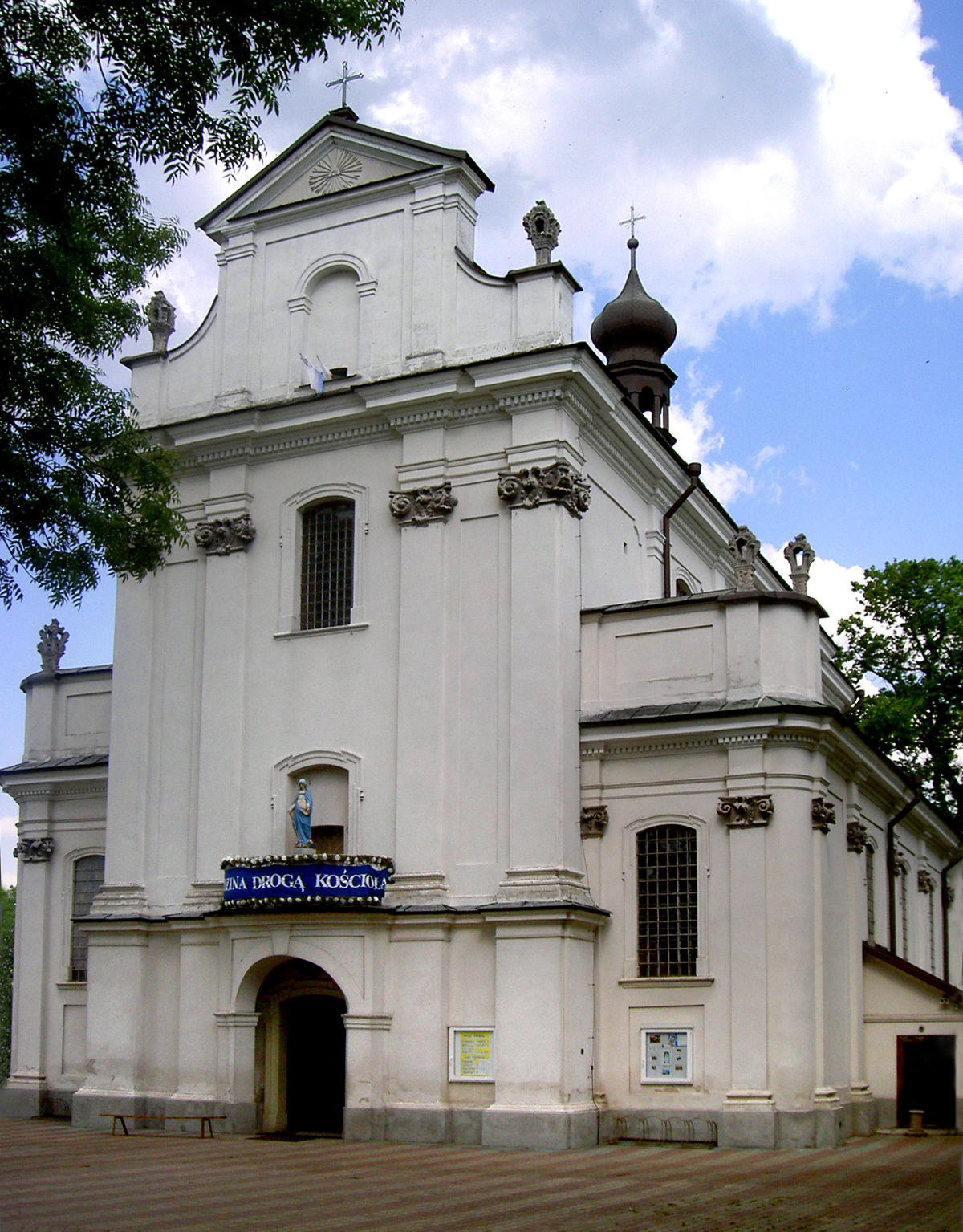
Baroque Church of the Transfiguration

The history of the town dates back to a medieval settlement, then known as Cierniogród. The town had city rights from the 16th to 19th century, and regained them in 1987. There are various tourist attractions in the town, including a synagogue built in 1686 and a late baroque church built between 1750 and 1771. Outside the church there is a belfry from 1777.

Tarnogród was founded in the mid-16th century in a location where a defensive gord called Cierniogród once had existed. It received Magdeburg rights in Piotrków Trybunalski, on 14 May 1567, from Polish King Sigismund II Augustus. The House of Zamoyski, which owned Tarnogród, built houses around a market square, together with a wooden town hall and prison tower. Later on, a hospital was added, together with two churches (1569, 1591) and a bathhouse. The town had three gates, its population in 1589 is estimated at app. 1,500. It was a Polish private town, administratively located in the Przemyśl Land in the Ruthenian Voivodeship in the Lesser Poland Province of the Polish Crown.

In 1588, Tarnogród became part of Zamoyski Family Fee Tail. The town had a vogt, a mayor and a council. In the early 17th century, Tarnogród had two Roman Catholic churches, a synagogue and an Orthodox church. In the mid-17th century, numerous wars and plagues decimated Tarnogrod's population. In this period, during the cossack riots, the Jewish community of Tarnogród almost perished. On 26 November 1715, the Tarnogród Confederation was formed here.

Following the First Partition of Poland (1772), the town was captured by Austrians, who brought here German settlers. Austrian rule ended in 1809 (see Polish–Austrian War), and for the next 6 years, Tarnogród belonged to the Polish Duchy of Warsaw, in which it became the seat of a county (until 1842). In 1815, the Duchy was dissolved and the town passed to Russian-controlled Congress Poland, in which it initially was the 7th largest city (after Warsaw, Kalisz, Lublin, Płock, Zamość and Piotrków Trybunalski), with a population of 3,391.

Many inhabitants joined the Polish January Uprising of 1863–1864. There is a memorial to the fallen Polish insurgents from Tarnogród in the Przedmieście Płuskie district in the northern part of the town. After the uprising, on 19 May 1870, Tarnogród lost its town charter, even though its population reached 5,000. On 17 June 1915, Tarnogród was captured by Austrian forces, which remained here until November 1918. In the Second Polish Republic, Tarnogrod belonged to Biłgoraj County, Lublin Voivodeship.

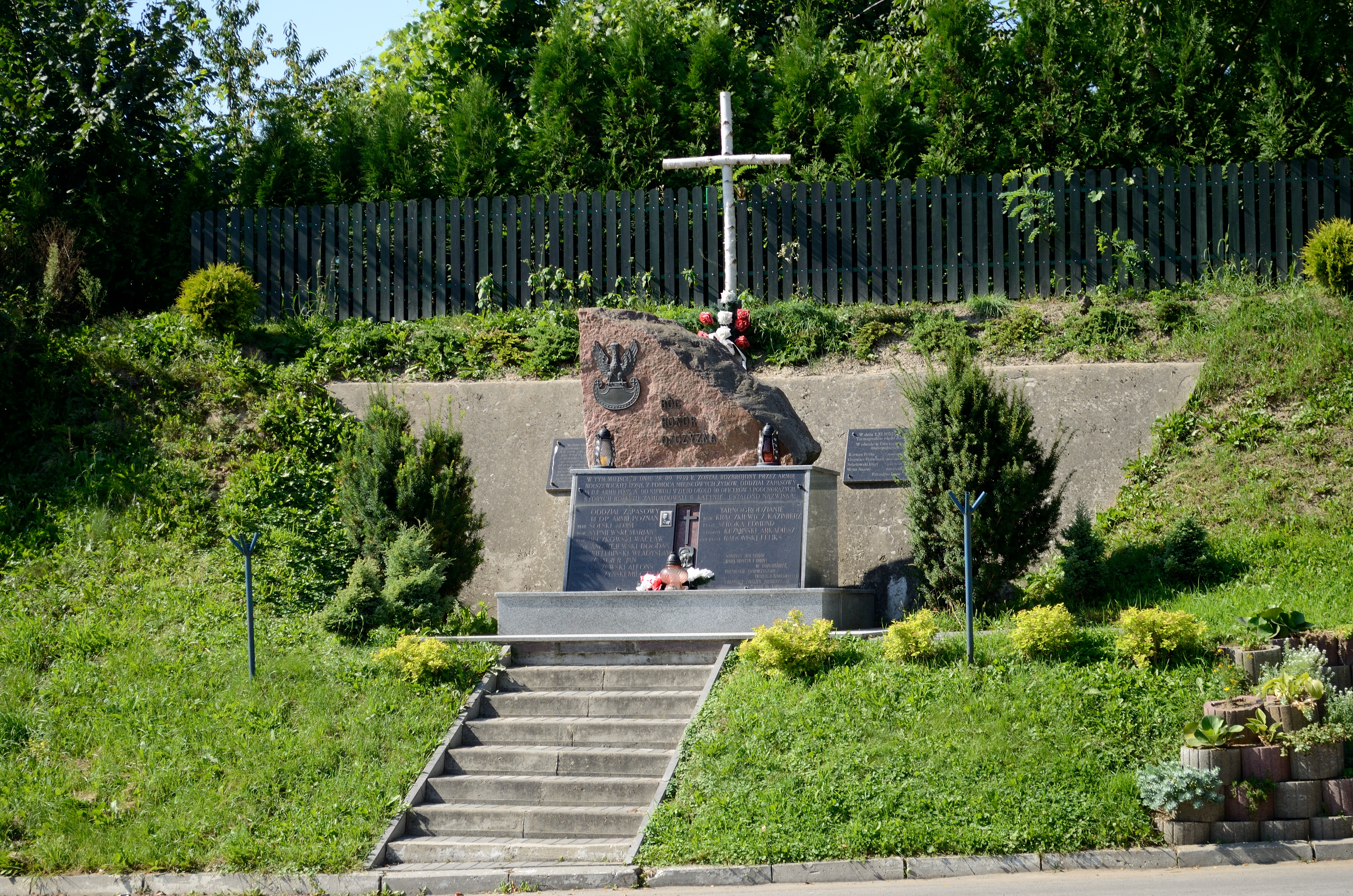
World War II memorial

During the joint German-Soviet invasion of Poland, which started World War II, on 15 September 1939, the Wehrmacht entered the village, burning several houses. The Wehrmacht rioted against the Jews of the village. On 27 September the Germans withdrew and were replaced by the Red Army, which remained here for two weeks. Polish prisoners of war captured by the Russians in Tarnogród were deported to Kozelsk and then murdered in the large Katyn massacre in 1940. On 26 October 1939, Tarnogród became part of General Government’s Lublin District. Germans carried out several massacres in the area of the village, which resulted in the Polish rebellion, the Zamość Uprising. On the outbreak of World War II, there were about 2,500 Jews in Tarnogród. As the war continued, Jews suffered restrictions and more riots. In May 1942 they transferred to a ghetto inside the village. Jews from the surrounding villages were also brought there by the Germans and were held in great density and harsh conditions. The Jewish community was liquidated on 2 November 1942, when 3,000 Jews from Tarnogród and its vicinity were deported to the Belzec extermination camp. Red Army re-entered Tarnogród in July 1944, which was afterwards restored to Poland.

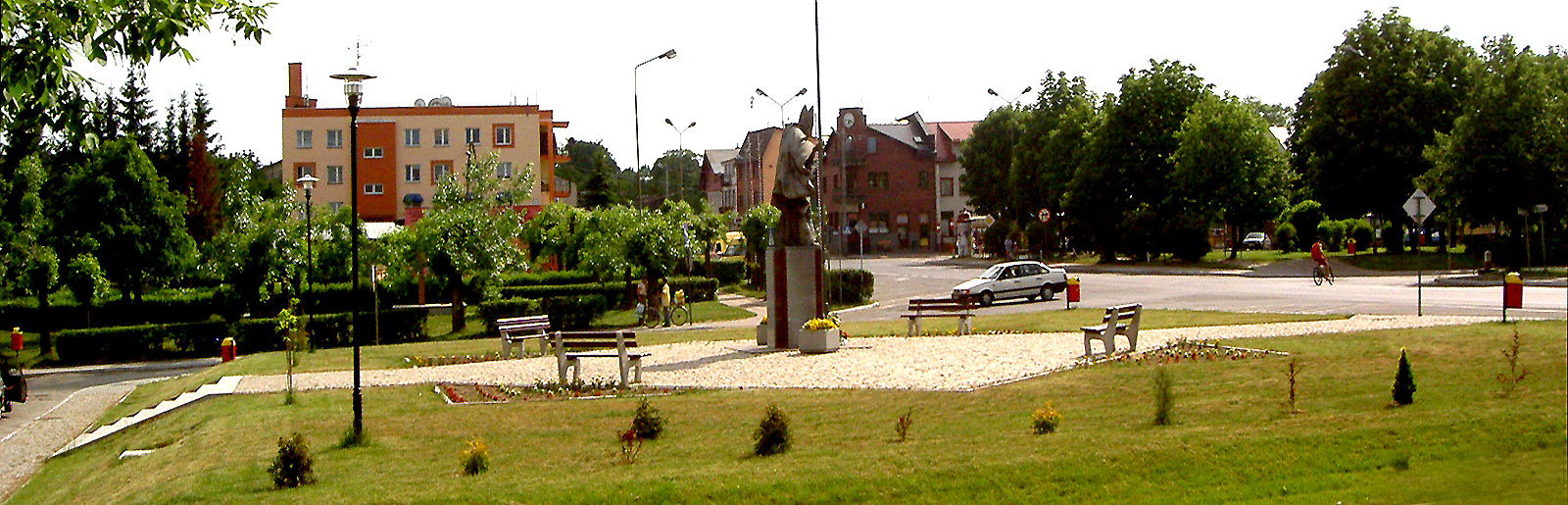
Town square in Tarnogród

With the liberation of the area, some of the few Jewish survivors returned to Tarnogród. After one of them was killed by locals, all survivors left and no Jews remained in the village. What remained is the area of the Jewish cemetery with few matzevahs left.

On 1 January 1987, Tarnogród regained its town status.

== Sports ==
The local football team is Olimpiakos Tarnogród. It competes in the lower leagues.

== See also ==
- Church of the Holy Trinity, Tarnogród
